= Original Cast Album: Co-Op =

- Documentary Now! episode
- Episode no.: Season 3 Episode 3
- Directed by: Alexander Buono
- Written by: John Mulaney; Seth Meyers
- Presented by: Helen Mirren
- Cinematography by: Alexander Buono
- Editing by: Jordan Kim
- Original air date: February 27, 2019
- Running time: 24 minutes

Guest appearances
- John Mulaney; Alex Brightman; Richard Kind; Renée Elise Goldsberry; Taran Killam; Paula Pell; James Urbaniak

Episode chronology
← Previous "Batsh*t Valley, Parts 1 & 2"	Next → "Waiting for the Artist"

"Original Cast Album: Co-Op" is the third episode of the third season of the American mockumentary television series Documentary Now!, created by Fred Armisen, Bill Hader, Seth Meyers, and Rhys Thomas. The show is hosted by Dame Helen Mirren and the series spoofs celebrated documentary films by parodying the style of each documentary with a similar, but fictitious, subject. The third season premiered on February 20, 2019. The episode premiered on IFC.

The cast includes theatre actors Richard Kind, Renée Elise Goldsberry, and Alex Brightman as well as comedians John Mulaney, Taran Killam and Paula Pell.

The episode received widespread critical acclaim and a Primetime Emmy Award nomination for Outstanding Original Music and Lyrics for "Holiday Party (I Did a Little Cocaine Tonight)". The season itself received three other Primetime Emmy Award nominations including Outstanding Variety Sketch Series, Outstanding Writing for a Variety Series.

== Inspiration ==
The episode is based on the 1970 D.A. Pennebaker film Original Cast Album: Company which observes the recording session to create the original cast album for the Stephen Sondheim musical Company. The mockumentary episode revolves around the marathon studio recording session for the original cast album of the ill-fated 1970 Broadway musical Co-Op, with songs detailing the joys and pains of a New York City housing cooperative. The episode was written by John Mulaney and features six original songs with music and lyrics by Eli Bolin, John Mulaney and Seth Meyers.

== Plot ==
In 1970, the cast of Co-Op, a musical detailing the joys and pains of a New York City housing cooperative, gathers in a studio to record the show's original cast album. After the cast records the opening number, the show's composer Simon Sawyer and producer Howard Pine break the news that the show is closing following bad reviews and that the cast recording will be the last time the cast performs the show.

An actor named Larry records his doorman character's patter song but is unable to control his breath, as reviewers had noted. Sawyer attempts to alter actress Dee Dee's pronunciation of the word "ruined" to "rooned". Dee Dee records a duet with Kenny about doing cocaine at a holiday party, as well as an "I want" song detailing a tennis pro's application to the building's board.

The final solo to be recorded is Patty's 11 o'clock number "I Gotta Go." Patty is annoyed because her request to sing at the beginning of the session so she could attend an eye doctor appointment was ignored. Now exhausted and under the effects of the medicine she was instructed to take, she makes repeated flubs. After 27 takes and several hours, Patty storms out, returning the following morning to complete the recording.

The full company assembles to sing the show's closing number, in which the entire cast gets stuck in an elevator after a juvenile delinquent presses all the buttons.

== Cast ==
- Alex Brightman as Kenny
- Renée Elise Goldsberry as Dee Dee
- Taran Killam as Benedict Juniper
- Richard Kind as Larry
- Paula Pell as Patty
- John Mulaney as Simon Sawyer
- James Urbaniak as Howard Pine

== Production ==
=== Development ===
Director Alexander Buono stated the whole idea for the episode was John Mulaney's, stating the episode was "this pure, distilled form of Mulaney", adding he wrote most of the material and brought in Seth Meyers to help write some of the songs. The director also stated that the Pennebakers had their complete support on this project often communicating with them via email. In an interview with Vulture, Mulaney stated the basis for the show was behind his experience with his Broadway show Oh, Hello with Nick Kroll. “I was like, ‘What is ’70s New York to me? I had spent a decade living in the 1970s New York doing Oh, Hello, so I thought, Oh, a co-op.” The documentary is a musical based on vignettes within a fictional cooperative apartment building in New York City during the 1970s. The title of the musical is Co-Op, but the reviewers keep calling it “coop” — a running gag that was cut from the episode for time, but which Mulaney wanted to explain by noting that the theater-owning Shubert Organization did not have the money to pay for a hyphen for the sign. The episode was based on the documentary films Original Cast Album: Company (1970) and Best Worst Thing That Ever Could Have Happened (2016).

=== Writing ===
Mulaney and Meyers, along with composer Eli Bolin, came up with lyrics using the melody and meter of other songs, mostly using Stephen Sondheim tunes as a basis. However, this wasn't always the case. For instance, the first song in the musical, “Co-Op,” pulled from Alan Menken and Howard Ashman’s “Skid Row,” the opening to Little Shop of Horrors. Other inspirations were more obscure. “I Gotta Go,” the showcase number of Paula Pell’s Elaine Stritch–esque character, which references Company’s “Ladies Who Lunch,” also pulls from Craig Carnelia’s “Just a Housewife” from the 1974 musical Working. Co-Op’s finale, “Going Up,” grew out of the unlikely combination of the rhythms of Sweeney Todd’s “A Little Priest” for the verse, and “Something Just Broke” from Assassins for the chorus. The song “Holiday Party (I Did a Little Cocaine Tonight),” written by Meyers, directly recalls the breakneck pace of Company’s “Getting Married Today,” substituting a woman’s wedding-day jitters for indulging drugs at a holiday party. In the Vulture article Bolin stressed, however, that his work differs from Sondheim’s simply because it’s not as complex as that of the musical-theater master. “A couple people listened to it while we were working on it and were like, ‘Is this legal?’” Bolin said. “We were able to explain how Sondheim’s 'Getting Married Today' is actually a lot more complicated, and my version is actually a lot more simple and less dissonant.”

=== Casting ===
Mulaney and James Urbaniak portray Simon Sawyer and Howard Pine, fictional characters based on Stephen Sondheim and Hal Prince. The episode also features a variety of actors known either for their work in musical theatre and comedy. Richard Kind, who appeared in Sondheim's failed musical Road Show, appears here as an actor with difficulty with his lines. Paula Pell portrays a character similar to Elaine Stritch from the Original Cast Album: Company documentary. Also cast were Hamilton’s Renée Elise Goldsberry and School of Rock’s Alex Brightman. Comedian Taran Killam also appears as the titular album's producer, and EGOT-winning composer Robert Lopez makes an uncredited appearance as a member of the musical's ensemble.

== Music ==
Documentary Now! Presents: Original Cast Album: Co-Op (Lakeshore Records, 2019)
No.	Title	Writer(s)	Singer	Length
1.	"Co-Op"	John Mulaney; Eli Bolin; Seth Meyers	The Ensemble	1:33
2.	"Christmas Tips"	Mulaney; Bolin; Meyers	Richard Kind	2:41
3.	"Holiday Party (I Did a Little Cocaine Tonight)"	Mulaney; Bolin; Meyers	Alex Brightman	2:50
4.	"My Home Court"	Mulaney; Bolin; Meyers	Renée Elise Goldsberry	4:24
5.	"I Gotta Go"	Mulaney; Bolin; Meyers	Paula Pell	3:08
6.	"Going Up"	Mulaney; Bolin; Meyers	Richard Kind, Paula Pell, Renée Elise Goldsberry	3:29
Total length:				16:85

=== Release ===
The soundtrack for the Season 3 episode was made available as an actual cast album in July 2019 (profits for the album were donated to Broadway Cares/Equity Fights AIDS). The sheet music was made available for free in August.

== Release ==
=== Viewers ===
The episode aired on February 27, 2019 on IFC and earned a 0.103 Nielsen rating with 103,000 viewers.

=== Home media ===
Documentary Now! season three is available for streaming on Netflix and Amazon Prime Video, not as a physical release. The episode is included as bonus content on the Criterion Collection 2021 release of Original Cast Album: Company (1970) on DVD and Blu-ray.

== Reception ==
=== Critical reception ===
Season three itself received a 100% approval rating from Rotten Tomatoes based on the 23 reviews from critics. The consensus reads, "Incisively critical of the genre and equally delighted by its subjects, Documentary Now! nails mockumentary under the deft direction of Rhys Thomas and Alex Buono."

The episode received widespread critical acclaim for its wit and pure invention. Esquire magazine raved writing, "Original Cast Recording: Co-Op" may be the best episode of the faux-documentary TV series yet". NPR praised the episode for its attention to detail, "There's also fine attention to detail, period and otherwise: the haircuts, the clothes, it's all very '70s. And the intense way that theatrical performers look when they're cutting a record — enunciating perfectly while staring wide-eyed, conducting with one hand, or putting a finger to an ear — is familiar to anyone who's ever seen a recording session documented."

=== Awards and nominations ===
Year	Award	Category	Nominated work	Result	Ref.
2019	Primetime Emmy Awards	Outstanding Variety Sketch Series	Documentary Now! Season Three	Nominated	
2019	Primetime Emmy Awards	Outstanding Writing for a Variety Series	Documentary Now! Season Three	Nominated	
2019	Primetime Emmy Awards	Outstanding Original Music and Lyrics	"Holiday Party (I Did A Little Cocaine Tonight)" from Documentary Now!	Nominated	
