= Company (original Broadway cast recording) =

Company – Original Cast Recording

Cast recording by the original cast
- Released: May 13, 1970
- Label: Columbia Masterworks

Company, subtitled A Musical Comedy and Original Cast Recording, is an album containing a recording of the 1970 Broadway musical Company made by its original cast. The album was released on Columbia Masterworks on May 13, 1970.

== Background ==
The album was produced by Thomas Z. Shepard.

== Critical reception ==
Professional ratings
Review scores
| Source | Rating |
|---|---|
| AllMusic | 3.5/5 stars |

In her contemporary review for AllMusic, Marjorie Ellen Ruhlmann notes that the musical "is highly acclaimed by theater-goers [and] critics" and that its score "is completely modern and utterly charming in every way".

== Chart performance ==
The album spent two weeks, that of June 20 and 27, 1970, at number 178 on the Billboard 200.

== Track listing ==
LP – Columbia Masterworks OS 3550

All lyrics are written by Stephen Sondheim; all music is composed by Stephen Sondheim.

Side 1
| No. | Title | Artist(s) | Length |
|---|---|---|---|
| 1. | "Company" | Dean Jones and Company |
| 2. | "The Little Things You Do Together" | Elaine Stritch, Barbara Barrie, Charles Kimbrough and Company |
| 3. | "Sorry-Grateful" | Charles Kimbrough, George Coe, Charles Braswell, Dean Jones |
| 4. | "You Could Drive a Person Crazy" | Donna McKechnie, Susan Browning, Pamela Myers |
| 5. | "Have I Got a Girl for You" "Someone Is Waiting" | Charles Braswell, John Cunningham, Steve Elmore, George Coe, Charles Kimbrough and Company; Dean Jones, The Vocal Minority |
| 6. | "Another Hundred People" | Pamela Myers |
| 7. | "Getting Married Today" | Beth Howland, Steve Elmore, Teri Ralston and Company |

Side 2
| No. | Title | Artist(s) | Length |
|---|---|---|---|
| 1. | "Side by Side by Side" "What Would We Do Without You?" | Dean Jones and Company |
| 2. | "Poor Baby" "Tick-Tock" | Barbara Barrie, Teri Ralston, Merle Louise, Beth Howland, Elaine Stritch, Charles Kimbrough, George Coe |
| 3. | "Barcelona" | Dean Jones, Susan Browning |
| 4. | "The Ladies Who Lunch" | Elaine Stritch |
| 5. | "Being Alive" | Dean Jones and Company |
| 6. | "Finale" | Company |

== Charts ==
| Chart (1970) | Peak position |
|---|---|
| US Billboard Top LPs | 178 |

== Awards ==
| Year | Award type | Categories | Results | Ref. |
|---|---|---|---|---|
| 1971 | Grammy Awards | Best Score from an Original Cast Show Album | Won | |

In 2008, the album was inducted into the Grammy Hall of Fame.

== See also ==
- Original Cast Album: Company, a 1970 film documenting the recording session for the original Broadway cast album
