= Christine Swanson =

American director and screenwriter

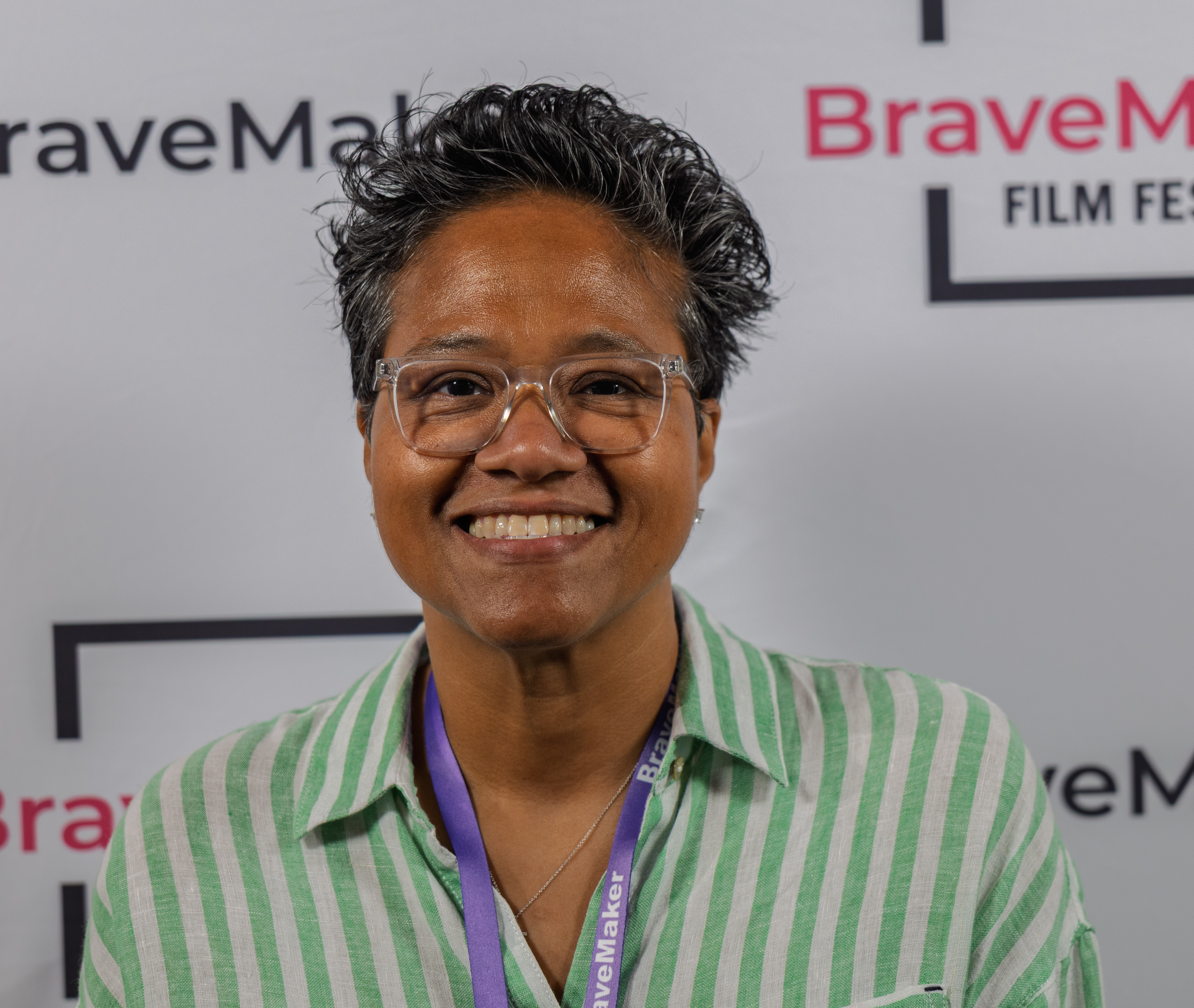
- Swanson at the BraveMaker Film Festival in 2026
- Born: July 15, 1971 (age 55); Detroit, Michigan, U.S
- Occupations: Director, writer
- Years active: 1998–present
- Spouse: Michael Swanson (m. 1994)
- Children: 4

Christine Swanson (born July 15, 1971) is an American film and television director and screenwriter.

== Life and career ==
Swanson was born and raised in Detroit, Michigan. She earned her MFA in Filmmaking from New York University Tisch School of the Arts and a Bachelor of Arts degree from the University of Notre Dame. In 1994, she married studio executive and film producer Michael Swanson. For her debut short film Two Seasons (1998), Swanson received American Black Film Festival Award. In 2001, Swanson wrote and made her feature directorial debut with the romantic comedy All About You. It received Best Film Award at the 2003 American Black Film Festival. Swanson released a followup entitled All About Us in 2007. She re-wrote screenplay for the 2004 drama film Woman Thou Art Loosed.

Swanson directed made-for-television movies To Hell and Back (2015), For the Love of Ruth (2015), Love Under New Management: The Miki Howard Story (2016), and The Clark Sisters: First Ladies of Gospel (2020), receiving NAACP Image Awards nominations for Outstanding Directing in a Motion Picture (Television) for For the Love of Ruth and The Clark Sisters: First Ladies of Gospel. She directed and wrote the 2022 short film Fannie starring Aunjanue Ellis-Taylor as Fannie Lou Hamer. At the 54th NAACP Image Awards, she received nomination for Outstanding Short Form (Live Action). She also wrote screenplay for the biographical drama film Kemba (2024). In 2024, she wrote and directed the drama film Albany Road starring Renée Elise Goldsberry and Lynn Whitfield.

Along with her film work, Swanson also directed episodes of television series Chicago P.D., FBI, MacGyver, P-Valley, Roswell, New Mexico, All American, All American: Homecoming and Found.

== Filmography ==
- Two Seasons (1998)
- All About You (2001)
- Woman Thou Art Loosed (2004)
- All About Us (2007)
- Six Weeks (2012)
- To Hell and Back (2015)
- For the Love of Ruth (2015)
- Love Under New Management: The Miki Howard Story (2016)
- BlacKorea (2017)
- The Clark Sisters: First Ladies of Gospel (2020)
- Fannie (2022)
- Kemba (2024)
- Albany Road (2024)
