= Albany Road =

2024 American film by Christine Swanson

- Directed by: Christine Swanson
- Written by: Christine Swanson
- Produced by: Michael Swanson; Sarah Sharp; Kevin McGrail; Brett Hays
- Starring: Renée Elise Goldsberry; Lynn Whitfield
- Cinematography: Spencer Combs
- Edited by: Grisha Alasadi
- Music by: Leon Lacey
- Production company: Faith Filmworks
- Distributed by: AMC Theatres Distribution
- Release date: April 20, 2024 (Ebertfest)
- Running time: 135 minutes
- Country: United States
- Language: English

Albany Road is a 2024 American road drama film directed and written by Christine Swanson. The film stars Renée Elise Goldsberry and Lynn Whitfield and follows a New York executive who shares a rental car during bad weather with her ex-fiancé's mother. Co-stars include J. Alphonse Nicholson, Lisa Arrindell, Gary Dourdan, Joe Holt and Rachel Nicks.

The film premiered at the 2024 Ebertfest film festival on April 20, 2024. It was included at the 28th annual American Black Film Festival in June 2024, and was released in selected theaters on November 15, 2024, by AMC Theatres and Malco Theatres.

== Cast ==
- Renée Elise Goldsberry as Celeste Simmons
- Lynn Whitfield as Paula Henderson
- J. Alphonse Nicholson as Kyle Henderson
- Lisa Arrindell as Carol
- Gary Dourdan as Phil
- Joe Holt as Billy
- Rachel Nicks as Morgan
- Ben Rappaport as Craig
- Lily Cowles as Andrea

== Production ==
Principal photography began in Champaign, Illinois in 2023. It was produced by Swanson's production company Faith Filmworks with her husband Michael Swanson serving as a producer. Goldsberry previously starred in Swanson's 2001 debut feature film, All About You. A rough cut was screened on September 30, 2023, at Saint Mary's College in Indiana.

== Reception ==
Film critic Nell Minow gave it a positive review praising the performances from Goldsberry, Whitfield and Arrindell, and Swanson's storytelling.

== Awards ==
Award	Date of ceremony	Category	Recipient(s)	Result	Ref.
Black Reel Awards	February 10, 2025	Outstanding Independent Film	Albany Road	Nominated	
NAACP Image Awards	February 22, 2025	Outstanding Independent Motion Picture	Albany Road	Nominated	
NAACP Image Awards	February 22, 2025	Outstanding Supporting Actress in a Motion Picture	Lynn Whitfield	Nominated	
