= Awesome Android =

Fictional character by Marvel Comics

- The Awesome Android on the cover (background) of Rom #14 (Feb. 1981). Art by Dave Cockrum.

Publication information
- Publisher: Marvel Comics
- First appearance: The Fantastic Four #15 (June 1963)
- Created by: Stan Lee (writer); Jack Kirby (artist)

In-story information
- Species: Robot
- Team affiliations: A.I. Army; Goodman, Lieber, Kurtzberg, & Holliway; Heavy Metal; Intelligencia
- Partnerships: Mad Thinker
- Notable aliases: Awesome Andy
- Abilities: Superhuman strength, stamina, durability, and athleticism; Power replication; Wind breath

The Awesome Android (also briefly known as Awesome Andy) is a fictional character appearing in American comic books published by Marvel Comics. The character first appeared in Fantastic Four #15 (June 1963) and was created by writer Stan Lee and artist and co-plotter Jack Kirby.

Debuting in the Silver Age of Comic Books, the character has made appearances in Marvel titles for over four decades, and also appeared in Marvel-related products including animated television series and trading cards.

== Publication history ==
Awesome Android was created by Jack Kirby and Stan Lee. The Awesome Android debuted in Fantastic Four #15 (June 1963) as the creation of the Mad Thinker. "Since then, [the Mad Thinker] and his 15-foot-tall (4.6 m) artificial being ... have had run-ins with most of Marvel's major superheroes."

The pair reappeared in Fantastic Four #28 (July 1964) to battle both the titular superhero team and the mutant superheroes the X-Men. The Android continued in the role of antagonist, appearing in Tales of Suspense #72 (Dec. 1965) as an opponent for Iron Man; Rom #14 (January 1981) against the Parker Brothers-licensed hero Rom; and in Captain America #311 (Nov. 1985). The Android reappeared as part of a supervillain team in The Avengers #286-289 (Feb.-May 1988); featured in the Acts of Vengeance storyline in Avengers Spotlight #27 (Mid-Dec. 1989); battled several Marvel heroes in Thunderbolts #2 (June 1997) and Heroes for Hire #1 (July 1997) and had two further encounters with the Fantastic Four in Fantastic Four vol. 3, #23 (Nov. 1999) and #43-44 (July-Aug. 2001). The Android was reclaimed and upgraded by the Thinker in a humorous storyline in the 2004–2005 series She-Hulk; and made a brief appearance in Exiles vol. 2 #4 (Sept. 2009).

== Fictional character biography ==
The villain Mad Thinker creates an artificial lifeform based on the research notes of Fantastic Four leader Mister Fantastic. A synthesis of ape DNA and unstable molecules incorporated into an almost indestructible body with a microcomputer and a solar-power source, the Awesome Android is directed against the Fantastic Four, although the superhero team defeats both the Android and the Thinker. The Awesome Android, still as a pawn of the Thinker, returns to battle the combined efforts of the Fantastic Four and the X-Men before being deactivated by Professor X.

After an appearance during the "War of the Super Villains" storyline, the Android is absent from Marvel continuity until directed by the Thinker to capture the Galadorian spaceknight Rom for further study. After a brief battle, Rom successfully deactivates the Android. The Android battles Captain America, having been repaired by then abandoned by the Thinker. The Super-Adaptoid, posing as the Fixer, reprograms the Android and uses it as part of an assault team of advanced robots called Heavy Metal.

After acquiring sentience, the Android rebels against the Thinker and seeks legal aid from law firm Goodman, Lieber, Kurtzberg & Holliway (the firm that employs Jennifer Walters). The Android is legally emancipated from the Mad Thinker, with a court recognizing the being as a male with a new name, "Awesome Andy." Andy becomes a general office worker for the firm. After being rejected by coworker Mallory Book, Andy returns to the Mad Thinker.

Awesome Android later appears as a member of the Intelligencia alongside Mad Thinker. During an attack by the Sinister Six, Awesome Android is shot into space by the Zero Cannon. MODOK Superior manages to resurrect Awesome Android and the other Intelligencia members.

During the "Iron Man 2020" event, Awesome Android appears as a member of the A.I. Army. He crashes a stability test at Brevoort Dynamics in Cambridge, Massachusetts and makes off with a robot that was being tested. During the raid, Arno Stark sent out a signal to keep the A.I. Army from escaping to the Thirteenth Floor. Machinesmith is entangled in wires that work to place the submission code in him as he begs for Awesome Android to help him. When Mark One crashes to the ground, Awesome Android then picks up Mark One's body as the A.I. Army and other robots are left devastated at what happened. Awesome Android brings Mark One to a bio-tube to heal him.

== Powers and abilities ==
The Awesome Android is created when the Mad Thinker steals and uses a technique invented by Mister Fantastic, involving splicing unstable molecules into the DNA patterns of an ape. It has limited artificial intelligence and no capacity for self-motivated activity, and is totally dependent on its programming or the programmer's spoken commands, and usually deactivates itself when not active.

The Android has inhuman physical attributes and can mimic an ability (one at a time) after touching an opponent. It can also emit close-range blasts of gale force wind from its mouth. The Android is given one weakness by the Thinker: a collection of nerves underneath its arms that will deactivate it if struck.

== Reception ==
=== Accolades ===
- In 2017, Screen Rant ranked the Awesome Android 10th in their "15 Best Thors In Marvel Comics" list.
- In 2018, CBR.com ranked the Awesome Android 12th in their "20 Most Powerful Androids Of The Marvel Universe" list.
- In 2021, CBR.com ranked the Awesome Android 6th in their "10 Strongest Robots In The Marvel Universe" list.

== Other versions ==
An alternate version of the Awesome Android named Bobby Burchill appears in Ultimate Fantastic Four. He is the younger brother and slave of Rhona Burchill.

== In other media ==
=== Television ===
- The Awesome Android appears in the "Namor" segment of The Marvel Super Heroes.
- A character based on the Awesome Android named Andy Erwin appears in Iron Man: Armored Adventures. He is an android that Rhona Burchill designed to resemble a goth and act as her "brother" before being destroyed by Iron Man.
- The Awesome Android appears in Ultimate Spider-Man, with vocal effects provided by Kevin Michael Richardson. This version is an experimental robot with a rudimentary, child-like artificial intelligence that can ingest inorganic matter to increase its size.

=== Miscellaneous ===
The Awesome Android appears in The Avengers: Earth's Mightiest Heroes #2.
