= Mad Thinker =

Marvel Comics fictional character

Publication information
- Publisher: Marvel Comics
- First appearance: Fantastic Four #15 (June 1963)
- Created by: Stan Lee (writer); Jack Kirby (artist)

In-story information
- Alter ego: René Rodin
- Team affiliations: Maggia; Triumvirate of Terror; Intelligencia; Illuminati; Masters of Evil
- Partnerships: Puppet Master; Egghead; Klaw; Wizard; Awesome Android
- Abilities: Master tactician and strategist Genius-level intellect Ability to project his mind into the body of Awesome Android and other robots

The Mad Thinker (René Rodin) is a supervillain appearing in American comic books published by Marvel Comics. He is portrayed to be an evil genius specializing in robotics. He is sometimes referred to just as "The Thinker".

== Publication history ==
The Mad Thinker was introduced by Stan Lee and Jack Kirby in Fantastic Four #15 (June 1963). Lee and Kirby gave the mad scientist a special ability to predict events to the precise second.

Little to nothing was known of his origins or true identity until, over fifty publication years later, the Mad Thinker's first name was revealed to be Julius in Brian Michael Bendis and Alex Maleev's Infamous Iron Man #2 (2016). In Fantastic Four #7 (2026), the character's name is instead stated to be René Rodin.

== Fictional character biography ==
In his initial appearance, the Mad Thinker attempts to take over New York City using the Baxter Building as his base. The Fantastic Four are lured away from New York just before a meteorite hits the city and briefly knocks out electrical power, including the Baxter Building's defense systems. The Mad Thinker creates a robotic servant, the Awesome Android, and traps the Fantastic Four in the lower quarters of the building, but is thwarted after Willie Lumpkin activates a circuit breaker.

After his initial defeat against the Fantastic Four, the Mad Thinker becomes one of their many recurring enemies, primarily out of a motivation to prove his own intelligence. The Mad Thinker has also been a member of the Intelligencia and the Illuminati.

After escaping from S.H.I.E.L.D. custody, Mad Thinker becomes obsessed with Mister Fantastic's whereabouts, as he has not returned to Earth-616. Misinterpreting Mister Fantastic's absence, Mad Thinker thinks that Mister Fantastic wants Mad Thinker to succeed him and the Fantastic Four. Mad Thinker hires Lumen, Goodfire, and Smash to make up his Fantastic Four and gives them powers similar to the Fantastic Four. Mad Thinker's Fantastic Four confronts Human Torch and Thing in an unidentified reality. Despite Human Torch and Thing being powerless at the time, they hold their own against Mad Thinker's Fantastic Four until they escape.

In the series Avengers (2025), the Mad Thinker organizes the Masters of Evil and leads them in invading the Impossible City. After his teammates are stopped by Captain America, Mad Thinker dons armor with technology derived from the Super-Adaptoid that allows him to use all the abilities of his teammates. However, the Impossible City performs a hard reset, freeing itself from the Masters of Evil. The rest of the Avengers appear and help defeat Mad Thinker.

== Powers and abilities ==
The Mad Thinker has no superhuman powers, but he is a genius with knowledge of technology centuries beyond conventional science. He has an eidetic memory and can rapidly organize and correlate vast amounts of information and perceive non-obvious patterns. He has the facilities and means to create all manner of sophisticated weaponry, androids, armor, and vehicles.

His analytical, mathematical, and geometrical abilities are of a sophisticated order not commonly found on Earth. He is particularly adept at computers, robotics, and artificial intelligence, with Ph.D.s in computer science and engineering. He created the androids Awesome Android and Quasimodo, and uses various other equipment as needed, including monocle-sized hypnotic lenses.

The Mad Thinker is also a proficient disguise artist who uses a surgically implanted radio link to project his consciousness into an android simulacrum of himself.

== Other versions ==
An original incarnation of the Mad Thinker named Rhona Burchill appears in the Ultimate Marvel imprint. She is a rejected applicant of the Baxter Building's think tank who sought revenge and removed portions of her brother Bobby's brain to increase her own intelligence. This process left Burchill with a deformed head and a disjointed, stream of consciousness speech pattern.

== In other media ==
=== Television ===
- The Mad Thinker appears in the "Iron Man" segment of The Marvel Super Heroes, voiced by Len Carlson.
- The Mad Thinker appears in The Avengers: Earth's Mightiest Heroes, voiced by Danny Mann.
- Rhona Burchill appears in Iron Man: Armored Adventures, voiced by Brenna O'Brien. This version is a goth who attempted to destroy the Baxter School in her youth before being sent to Ravencroft. She escaped, built the android Andy to act as her "brother", and took the identity of Rhona Erwin, the smartest student at Tomorrow Academy until Tony Stark enrolled.

=== Video games ===
The Mad Thinker appears in Marvel Snap.

=== Miscellaneous ===
- The Mad Thinker appears in issue #12 of The Avengers: Earth's Mightiest Heroes tie-in comic.
- The Mad Thinker appears in Fantastic Four: First Foes. This version is a former teacher of Reed Richards and acted as mission control in the mission that led to the Fantastic Four being exposed to cosmic rays. The Mad Thinker resents being sidelined, believing that he alone was responsible for returning the ship to Earth safely.
