= All About You (film) =

2001 film by Christine Swanson

- Film poster
- Directed by: Christine Swanson
- Written by: Christine Swanson
- Produced by: Michael Swanson
- Starring: Renée Elise Goldsberry; Terron Brooks; Debbie Allen; LisaRaye; Lou Myers
- Cinematography: Wolf Baschung; David Scardina
- Edited by: Lillian Benson
- Music by: John Bickerton; Andreas Geck
- Production companies: Faith Filmworks; One Accord
- Distributed by: Urbanworks
- Release date: August 4, 2001 (Urbanworld Film Festival)
- Running time: 90 minutes
- Country: United States
- Language: English

All About You is a 2001 romantic comedy film written and directed by Christine Swanson. The film stars Renée Elise Goldsberry as a woman who tries to find love and ends up in a complicated romantic triangle. The film had its world premiere on August 4, 2001, at the Urbanworld Film Festival. Swanson initially had some difficulty in finding a distributor for the film, as distributors stated it was "not edgy enough".

Swanson released a followup entitled All About Us in 2007.

== Premise ==
Nicole is in love with her boyfriend Robbie and is ready to start talking about marriage. Unfortunately for her, he hasn’t even thought about a future with her. She moves to San Francisco to start a new life, and ends up with Robbie's brother Brian as her roommate for one month. Just as Nicole and Brian realize they have feelings for each other, Robbie wants to try a relationship with Nicole again.

== Cast ==
- Renée Elise Goldsberry as Nicole Taylor
- Terron Brooks as Brian Tate
- Debbie Allen as Ruth
- LisaRaye as Lisa
- Lou Myers as Toomie
- Vanessa Bell Calloway as Donna Taylor
- Bobby Hosea as Greg Taylor
- Chris Spencer as Owen
- Tico Wells as Walter
- Rockmond Dunbar as Tim Minor
- Adam Lazarre-White as Robbie Tate
- Sheila Frazier as Mrs. Tate
- Michael White, Jr as Terry Bolton
- Emily Liu as Wendy

== Reception ==
DVD Talk and Chicago Reader both praised the film's acting while also criticizing the script as being overly predictable.

=== Awards ===
- Best Film at the American Black Film Festival (2003, won)
- Audience Favorite Award at the Roxbury Film Festival (2003, won)
- Jury Award for Best Feature Film at the Hollywood Black Film Festival (2002, won)
