= Renée Elise Goldsberry =

American actress (born 1971)

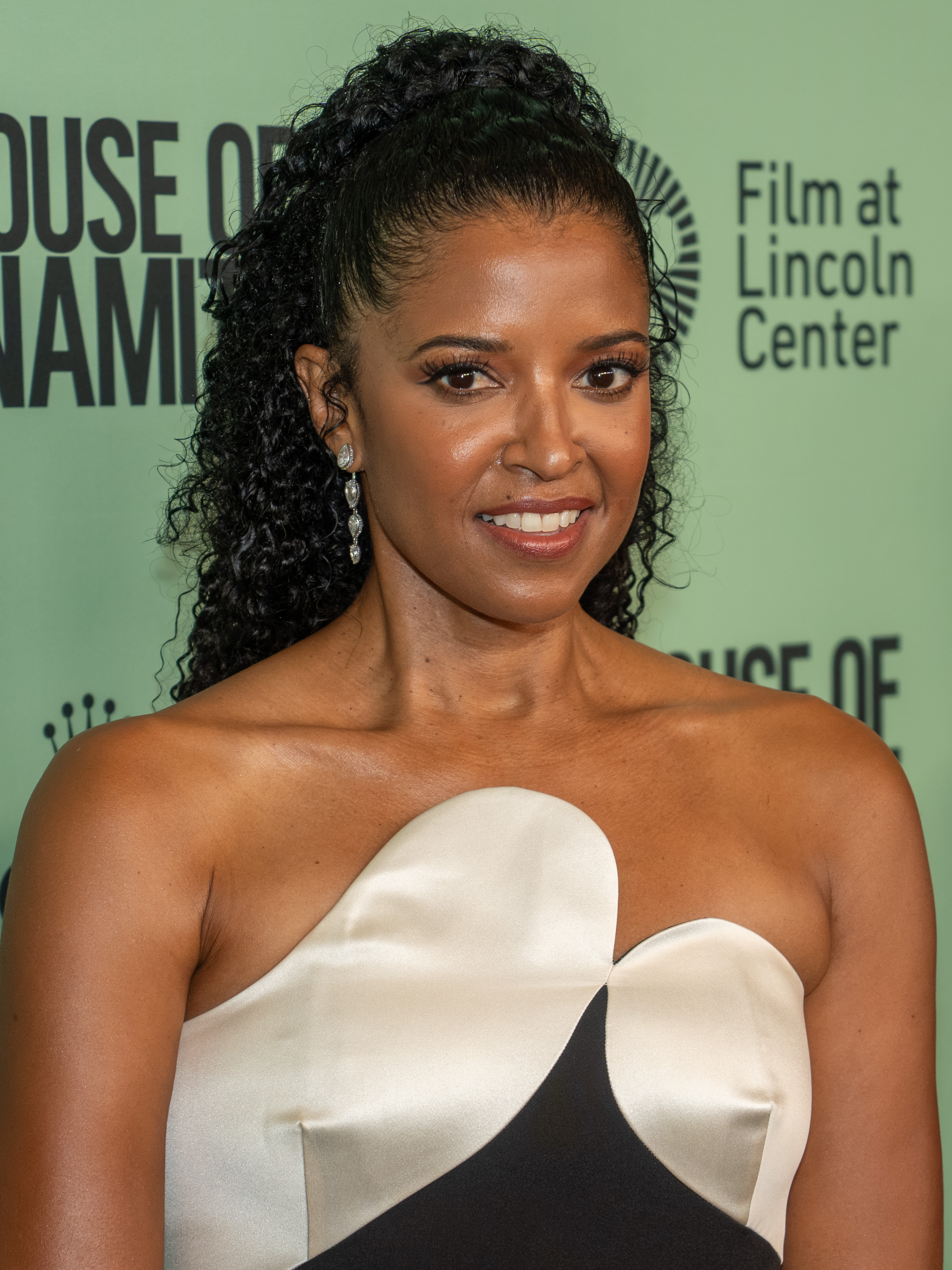
- Goldsberry at the 2025 New York Film Festival
- Born: January 2, 1971 (age 55); San Jose, California, U.S.
- Education: Carnegie Mellon University (BFA); University of Southern California (MM)
- Occupations: Actress; singer
- Years active: 1997–present
- Spouse: Alexis Johnson (m. 2002)
- Children: 2

Renée Elise Goldsberry (born January 2, 1971) is an American actress and singer. Known for her roles on stage and screen she has received a Tony Award, a Drama Desk Award, and a Grammy Award as well as a nomination for a Primetime Emmy Award.

She gained stardom and acclaim for originating the role of Angelica Schuyler in the original Broadway production of the Lin-Manuel Miranda musical Hamilton (2015–2016), for which she won the Tony Award for Best Featured Actress in a Musical and the Grammy Award for Best Musical Theater Album. For her performance as Silvia in The Public Theater revival of the William Shakespeare adaptation Two Gentlemen of Verona (2005) she was nominated for the Drama Desk Award for Distinguished Performance. Her other Broadway credits include Mimi Marquez in Rent (1996), Nettie Harris in the original cast of The Color Purple (2005), and Kate in the David Lindsay-Abaire play Good People (2011).

On television, she portrayed Evangeline Williamson on One Life to Live, for which she received two nominations for the Daytime Emmy Award for Outstanding Supporting Actress in a Drama Series. She also played Geneva Pine on the CBS legal drama The Good Wife (2010–2016), Wickie Roy in the Peacock/Netflix musical comedy series Girls5eva (2021–2024), and Mallory Book in the Disney+ superhero miniseries She-Hulk: Attorney at Law (2022). At the 73rd Primetime Emmy Awards, she was nominated for the Primetime Emmy Award for Outstanding Supporting Actress in a Limited or Anthology Series or Movie for reprising her role in the Disney+ live stage recording of Hamilton, which was released in 2020.

== Early life and education ==
Goldsberry was born on January 2, 1971, in San Jose, California. She was raised in both Houston and Detroit. She is the daughter of Betty Sanders, an industrial psychologist, and her father was an automotive industry executive in Michigan. Goldsberry has one older brother and two younger brothers. Goldsberry was introduced to theater in summer camp when she was eight years old. Renée's younger brother was shy, and their mother enrolled both of them in camp at the HITS Theatre in Houston taught by Carolyn Franklin.

After graduating from Cranbrook Kingswood School in Bloomfield Hills, Michigan, she attended Carnegie Mellon University, where she graduated with a Bachelor of Fine Arts in theater, in 1993. This is also where she became a member of Delta Sigma Theta sorority through the Theta Beta chapter. She subsequently attended graduate school at the University of Southern California's Thornton School of Music, where she received a Master of Music in jazz studies, graduating in 1997.

== Career ==
=== 1997–2014: Rise to prominence ===
Between 1997 and 2002, Goldsberry had a recurring role on the Fox legal comedy-drama Ally McBeal, as one of the backup singers who frequently accompanied Vonda Shepard's performances. She appeared in a total of 43 episodes prior to the series' cancellation. Goldsberry was in the cast of the United States national tour of Dreamgirls (1997) and played a replacement Nala in the Broadway production of The Lion King (2002), Goldsberry has had a lengthy singing and songwriting career, co-writing and performing more than half the soundtrack to the 2001 film All About You, including the title song. She was also the grand prize winner of the 1997 John Lennon Songwriting Contest for her rock music. Goldsberry wrote and recorded an album titled Everything But the Kitchen Sink (2001) and an EP titled Beautiful (2006). She was nominated for a Drama League Award for Distinguished Performance, and won a New York magazine Best of 2005 Award, for her performance as Sylvia in the 2005 Shakespeare in the Park revival of Two Gentlemen of Verona. Goldsberry later originated the role of Nettie Harris in The Color Purple, the Broadway musical adaptation of the Pulitzer Prize-winning 1982 novel of the same name. She starred in the production from November 2005 to January 2006.

Goldsberry also carried the role over into a three-episode guest appearance on the spin-off series Ally. In 2001, Goldsberry had the lead role of Nicole Taylor in the romantic comedy All About You, for which her performance was praised. She also portrayed Drea Smalls in the 2008 action film Pistol Whipped. Goldsberry portrayed attorney Evangeline Williamson on the ABC soap opera One Life to Live from 2003 until 2007. She was nominated for an NAACP Image Award in 2004 for Outstanding Actress in a Daytime Drama Series and won a Soap Opera Digest Award in 2005 with co-stars Michael Easton and Melissa Archer. Goldsberry was nominated for the Daytime Emmy Award for Outstanding Supporting Actress in a Drama Series in both 2006 and 2007 for the role.

Goldsberry returned to the Off-Broadway stage in The Baker's Wife in 2007, before taking over the role of Mimi Márquez in the Broadway musical Rent, making her the final actress to play the role on Broadway. Rent's last performance was filmed and made into a DVD, Rent: Filmed Live on Broadway, which also aired as a television film. In 2011, she was nominated for an Outer Critics Circle Award for her portrayal of Kate Dillon in the Broadway production of David Lindsay-Abaire's play Good People. She went on to appear in off-Broadway productions of Love's Labour's Lost and As You Like It, and appeared in I'm Getting My Act Together and Taking It on the Road at Encores!. After she left One Life to Live, Goldsberry held a recurring role as assistant state attorney Geneva Pine on the CBS political drama The Good Wife, appearing in 23 episodes between 2010 and the series' end in 2016.

=== 2015–2019: Breakthrough with Hamilton ===
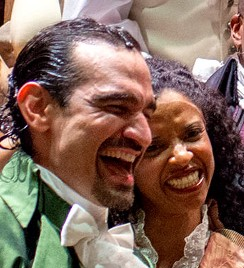
Goldsberry (right) with co-star Javier Muñoz in costume for Hamilton

Goldsberry originated the role of Angelica Schuyler in Lin-Manuel Miranda created historical musical Hamilton, playing her last performance in the role on September 3, 2016. In the musical she acted opposite Miranda, Leslie Odom Jr., Phillipa Soo, Daveed Diggs, Jonathan Groff and Anthony Ramos. Marilyn Stasio of Variety praised her performance writing that she gave the role "unexpected depth". Leah Greenblatt of Entertainment Weekly wrote that Soo and Goldsberry "bring both fierceness and fragility to keenly drawn supporting roles". In the production she gained notoriety for singing "Satisfied", a song about the unrequited love she has for Alexander Hamilton, following the number "Helpless" which details the engagement and marriage between her sister Eliza (Soo) and Hamilton. Mark Kennedy of Associated Press praised her performance writing, "'Satisfied' is a Rashomon love moment led by a glorious Goldsberry." She performed "The Schuyler Sisters" alongside Phillipa Soo and Jasmine Cephas Jones at the White House in 2016.

For her work in the production, she won a 2015 Drama Desk Award, the Lucille Lortel Award for Outstanding Featured Actress in a Musical, and the 2016 Tony Award for Best Featured Actress in a Musical. In addition, as a member of the principal cast, she also received a Grammy Award after the original cast album won Best Musical Theater Album at the 2016 Grammy Awards. In October 2015, she appeared at the BET Hip Hop Awards, where she was one of two women to rap in the Cypher. During this time she had small supporting roles as Cynthia Barnes in the crime drama Every Secret Thing (2014) and Kim in the comedy Sisters (2015). Goldsberry then played the title role in the HBO television film adaptation of Rebecca Skloot's nonfiction work, The Immortal Life of Henrietta Lacks. The production earned a nomination for the Primetime Emmy Award for Outstanding Television Movie.

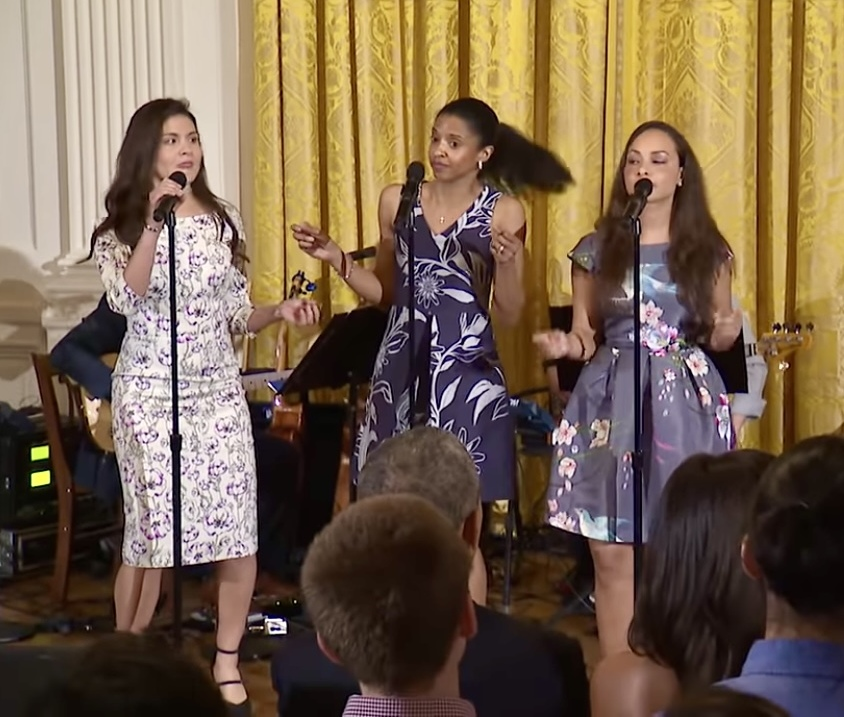
Goldsberry (center) performs with Hamilton castmates at the White House

In 2018, she appeared in the Netflix science fiction series Altered Carbon as Quellcrist Falconer, and reprised the role in season 2. She also performed the Johnny Cash song "Ain't No Grave" for the end credits to the final episode. That same year she took a supporting role in the fantasy comedy The House with a Clock in Its Walls (2018), acting opposite Cate Blanchett and Jack Black. The following year, she then took a supporting role in the A24 psychological drama Waves (2019) acting opposite her co-star Sterling K. Brown. The film which debuted at the Telluride Film Festival received positive reviews. Sheri Linden of The Hollywood Reporter described her performance as "quietly imposing" adding, She dishes out the parental tough love...but always with an eye toward smoothing things over."

That same year she took the role as Dee Dee, a backup singer in the IFC mockumentary series Documentary Now! episode "Original Cast Album: Co-Op" (2019). The episode spoofs the D. A. Pennebaker documentary Original Cast Album: Company about the recording sessions for the original cast recording of the Stephen Sondheim musical Company (1970). She acted opposite Alex Brightman, Taran Killam, Paula Pell, and Richard Kind. During this time Goldsberry made guest appearances on series such as Evil (2019 TV series from the same creators of The Good Wife), Star Trek: Enterprise, Royal Pains, Law & Order: Special Victims Unit, Younger, Masters of Sex, and That '80s Show.

=== 2020–present: Girls5eva ===
She was nominated for the Primetime Emmy Award for Outstanding Supporting Actress in a Limited or Anthology Series or Movie for the filmed recording of Hamilton in 2016 which was released on Disney+ in 2020. Alissa Wilkinson of Vox praised the staging and direction of the Disney+ taping as well as her performance writing writing that "Goldsberry’s rapid-fire flow as Angelica Schuyler, mixed with her sideways glances and obvious pain in longing for Alexander" are "emotions you can see in the film far better than you can from the back row of the Richard Rodgers Theatre". The following year she had a cameo appearance with her Hamilton co-star Phillipa Soo as well as Broadway legends Bernadette Peters, André De Shields, Bebe Neuwirth, Chita Rivera, and Joel Grey in the Lin-Manuel Miranda directed biographical musical film Tick, Tick... Boom! based on the Jonathan Larson musical of the same name.

From 2021 to 2024, Goldsberry starred in the Netflix musical comedy series Girls5eva playing the role of Wickie Roy, a member of a one-hit wonder early 2000's girl band group Girls5eva. Girls5eva chronicles their reunion and attempts to reignite their stardom. The series premiered on May 6, 2021, on the Peacock. Goldsberry starred opposite Sara Bareilles, Paula Pell, and Busy Philipps. For her performance she earned two nominations for the Critics' Choice Television Award for Best Actress in a Comedy Series. Reviewing the third season, Saloni Gajjar of The A.V. Club called Goldsberry the show's scene-stealer and MVP, writing, "It shouldn’t be this easy to root for a selfish Wickie, who spins things out of control by being extra, but Goldsberry pulls off that feat".

In 2022, she portrayed Mallory Book in the Disney+ superhero miniseries She-Hulk: Attorney at Law and voiced Roxy in the Disney Junior animated series Eureka. The next year she returned to the stage playing Prospero in a musical adaptation of The Tempest as part of the 2023 season of Shakespeare in the Park. Annie Levin of The Observer wrote, "Goldsberry, radiant with health, flies about the stage singing and dancing, wins a great victory over her enemies and has her dukedom returned to her. She does not pretend to be the elderly Prospero". She added "this very Disney production lacks that kind of subtlety, as does Goldsberry’s delivery." In 2024, she debuted the documentary, Satisfied, about her life and career. The film premiered at the Tribeca Film Festival in 2024.

== Personal life ==
In 2002, Goldsberry married New York attorney Alexis Johnson. In May 2009, she gave birth to their first child, a son named Benjamin Johnson. In 2014, she and her husband adopted a second child, a daughter from Africa named Brielle.

== Acting credits ==
=== Film ===
Year	Title	Role	Notes
2001	Palco & Hirsch	Jessica	
2001	All About You	Nicole Taylor	Also composer and lyricist
2002	Turnaround	Rachel	
2008	Pistol Whipped	Drea Smalls	
2009	Jump the Broom: A Musical	Ayana	Short film
2014	Every Secret Thing	Cynthia Barnes	
2015	Sisters	Kim	
2018	The House with a Clock in Its Walls	Selena Izard	
2019	Waves	Catherine	
2020	Hamilton	Angelica Schuyler	Filmed recording of 2016 Broadway musical
2021	Tick, Tick... Boom!	"Sunday" Legend	
2022	Anything's Possible	Selene	
2024	Albany Road	Celeste Simmons	
2024	Big City Greens the Movie: Spacecation	Colleen Voyd (voice)	
2025	A House of Dynamite	First Lady of the United States	

=== Television ===
Year	Title	Role	Notes
1997–2002	Ally McBeal	Singer	43 episodes
1999	Ally	Singer	3 episodes
2002	Providence	Clare	Episode: "The Start of Something Big"
2002	Any Day Now	Beverly Morris	Episode: "The Real Thing"
2002	That '80s Show	Spokesmodel #2	Episode: "Road Trip"
2002	Star Trek: Enterprise	Crewman Kelly	Episode: "Vox Sola"
2002	One on One	Paulette	Episode: "Fatal Attractions"
2003–2007	One Life to Live	Evangeline Williamson	272 episodes
2008	The Return of Jezebel James	Paget Kaufman	2 episodes
2008	Rent: Filmed Live on Broadway	Mimi Marquez	TV film
2008	Life on Mars	Denise Watkins	Episode: "Things to Do in New York When You Think You're Dead"
2010	Royal Pains	Mrs. Phillips	Episode: "Big Whoop"
2010	White Collar	Ellen Samuel	Episode: "Company Man"
2010–2016	The Good Wife	Geneva Pine	23 episodes
2013	The Following	Olivia Warren	3 episodes
2013	Save Me	Mary	Episode: "The Book of Beth"
2013–2014	Law & Order: Special Victims Unit	Defense Attorney Martha Marron	3 episodes
2014	Masters of Sex	Morgan Hogue	Episode: "Blackbird"
2015	Younger	Courtney Ostin	Episode: "Hedonism"
2016	I Shudder	Lucy Wainscott	TV film
2017	The Get Down	Misty Holloway	Episode: "Gamble Everything"
2017	The Immortal Life of Henrietta Lacks	Henrietta Lacks	TV film
2018–2019	The Lion Guard	Dhahabu (voice)	2 episodes
2018–2020	Altered Carbon	Quellcrist Falconer	Series regular
2019	Documentary Now!	Dee Dee	Episode: "Original Cast Album: Co-Op"
2019–2021	Evil	Renée Harris	3 episodes
2019–2021	Fast & Furious: Spy Racers	Ms. Nowhere (voice)	Main role
2020	Zoey's Extraordinary Playlist	Ava Price	3 episodes
2020	Dragons: Rescue Riders: Secrets of the Songwing	Melodia (voice)	TV special
2021	Centaurworld	Waterbaby (voice)	7 episodes
2021–2024	Girls5eva	Wickie Roy	Main role
2022	She-Hulk: Attorney at Law	Mallory Book	Main role; 5 episodes
2022–2023	Eureka!	Roxy (voice)	Main role
2024	Clone High	Sandra Sandria (voice)	Episode: "Cloney Island: Twist!"
2025	Everybody's Live with John Mulaney	Mrs. T	Episode: "Is Uber Good?"
2026	Cupertino	Nichole Ferebee	

=== Theater ===
Year	Title	Role	Location	Category
1997	Dreamgirls	Michelle Morris	—N/a	National Tour
2002	The Lion King	Nala	New Amsterdam Theatre	Broadway
2005	Two Gentlemen of Verona	Silvia	Delacorte Theater	Off-Broadway
2005–2006	The Color Purple	Nettie Harris	Broadway Theatre	Broadway
2007	The Baker's Wife	Genevieve Castagnet	York Theatre	Off-Broadway
2008	Rent	Mimi Márquez	Nederlander Theatre	Broadway
2011	Good People	Kate Dillon	Samuel J. Friedman Theatre	Broadway
2011	Love's Labour's Lost	Princess of France	The Public Theater	Off-Broadway
2012	As You Like It	Celia	Delacorte Theater	Off-Broadway
2013	I'm Getting My Act Together and Taking It on the Road	Heather Jones	New York City Center	Encores! concert
2014	Hamilton	Angelica Schuyler	The 52nd Street Project	Workshop
2015	Hamilton	Angelica Schuyler	The Public Theater	Off-Broadway
2015–2016	Hamilton	Angelica Schuyler	Richard Rodgers Theatre	Broadway
2023	The Tempest	Prospero	Delacorte Theatre	Central Park
2025	All In: Comedy About Love	Performer	Hudson Theatre	Broadway

== Discography ==
- Everything But the Kitchen Sink (2001, out of print)
- A Holiday Affair (2006, sings "The Christmas Song")
- Beautiful (2006, EP; out of print)
- The Color Purple (2006, original Broadway cast recording)
- Hamilton (2015, original Broadway cast recording)
- Original Cast Album: Co-Op (2019, Lakeshore Records)
- Zoey's Extraordinary Playlist (2020, Season 1 Soundtrack)
- Girls5eva (2021, soundtrack)
- Who I Really Am (2025)

== Awards and nominations ==
Year	Award	Category	Nominated work	Result	Ref
2004	NAACP Image Awards	Outstanding Actress in a Daytime Drama Series	One Life to Live	Nominated	
2005	Soap Opera Digest Awards	Favorite Triangle	One Life to Live	Won	
2005	Drama League Awards	Distinguished Performance	Two Gentlemen of Verona	Nominated	
2006	Daytime Emmy Awards	Outstanding Supporting Actress in a Drama Series	One Life to Live	Nominated	
2007	Daytime Emmy Awards	Outstanding Supporting Actress in a Drama Series	One Life to Live	Nominated	
2007	NAACP Image Awards	Outstanding Actress in a Daytime Drama Series	One Life to Live	Nominated	
2011	Outer Critics Circle Awards	Outstanding Featured Actress in a Play	Good People	Nominated	
2015	Drama Desk Awards	Outstanding Featured Actress in a Musical	Hamilton	Won	
2015	Lucille Lortel Awards	Outstanding Featured Actress in a Musical	Hamilton	Won	
2016	Tony Awards	Best Featured Actress in a Musical	Hamilton	Won	
2016	Grammy Awards	Best Musical Theater Album	Hamilton	Won	
2016	Broadway.com Audience Awards	Favorite Featured Actress in a Musical	Hamilton	Won	
2021	Primetime Emmy Awards	Outstanding Actress in a Supporting Role in a Limited or Anthology Series or Movie	Hamilton	Nominated	
2021	Black Reel Awards for Television	Outstanding Actress, Comedy Series	Girls5eva	Nominated	
2021	Hollywood Critics Association TV Awards	Best Actress in a Streaming Series, Comedy	Girls5eva	Nominated	
2021	Television Critics Association Awards	Individual Achievement in Comedy	Girls5eva	Nominated	
2022	Critics' Choice Television Awards	Best Actress in a Comedy Series	Girls5eva	Nominated	
2023	Critics' Choice Television Awards	Best Actress in a Comedy Series	Girls5eva	Nominated	
2024	Television Critics Association Awards	Individual Achievement in Comedy	Girls5eva	Nominated	

== See also ==
- African-American Tony nominees and winners
