= Documentary Now! =

American mockumentary television series on IFC

- Genre: Mockumentary
- Created by: Fred Armisen; Bill Hader; Seth Meyers; Rhys Thomas
- Directed by: Rhys Thomas; Alex Buono; Micah Gardner
- Presented by: Helen Mirren
- Starring: Fred Armisen; Bill Hader
- Theme music composer: Josh Moshier
- Country of origin: United States
- Original language: English
- No. of seasons: 4
- No. of episodes: 27

Production
- Executive producers: Fred Armisen; Bill Hader; Seth Meyers; Lorne Michaels; Rhys Thomas; Andrew Singer
- Production company: Broadway Video (credited)

Original release
- Network: IFC
- Release: August 20, 2015 – November 16, 2022

Documentary Now! is an American mockumentary television series created by Fred Armisen, Bill Hader, Seth Meyers, and Rhys Thomas, and premiered on August 20, 2015, on IFC. Armisen and Hader star in many episodes, and Thomas and Alex Buono co-direct most episodes. Hosted by Helen Mirren, the series spoofs celebrated documentary films by parodying the style of each documentary with a similar, but fictitious, subject. The third season premiered on February 20, 2019. On April 8, 2019, the series was renewed for a fourth season, which premiered on October 19, 2022 and was also released on AMC+.

== Premise ==
Documentary Now! presents itself as a long-running news magazine for documentaries, initially celebrating its 50th season. Mirren appears at the beginning of each episode to introduce the "classic" documentary that the audience is about to see.

== Cast ==
Actor	Seasons			
Actor	1	2	3	4
Fred Armisen	Main	Main	Main	Main
Bill Hader	Main	Main		
Helen Mirren	Main	Main	Main	Main

== Episodes ==
Seasons of Documentary Now!
Season	Episodes	Originally released	
Season	Episodes	First released	Last released
1	7	August 20, 2015	September 24, 2015
2	7	September 14, 2016	October 26, 2016
3	7	February 20, 2019	March 27, 2019
4	6	October 19, 2022	November 16, 2022

=== Season 1 (2015) ===
Documentary Now! season 1 episodes
No. overall	No. in season	Title	Directed by	Written by	Subject parodied	Original release date	U.S. viewers (millions)
1	1	"Sandy Passage"	Rhys Thomas & Alex Buono	Seth Meyers	Grey Gardens	August 20, 2015	0.16
An in-depth look at the daily lives of two aging socialites and their crumbling estate. Guest cast: Rob Benedict as Larry Fein, Randy Oglesby as Officer #1, Eric Nenninger as Officer #2, and Sy Richardson as David
2	2	"Kunuk Uncovered"	Rhys Thomas & Alex Buono	Seth Meyers	Nanook Revisited	August 27, 2015	0.25
An investigation into the seminal 1922 documentary Kunuk the Hunter that attempts to separate what is real from what is fabrication. Guest cast: John Slattery as William H. Sebastian, Mike O'Brien as Young Alexander Krauss, Tim Robinson as Young Barnabas Scott, Sveinn Ólafur Gunnarsson as Chacal, Wilma Pelly as Aglatki Qamaniq, and Linda Porter as Meredith Sebastian
3	3	"DRONEZ: The Hunt for El Chingon"	Rhys Thomas & Alex Buono	Duffy Boudreau, Bill Hader & Rob Klein	VICE News documentaries	September 3, 2015	0.11
The hipster media empire DRONEZ sends a series of its notoriously fearless journalists to track down Mexico's most wanted drug lord. Guest cast: Jack Black as Jamison Friend, Ty Dolla $ign as himself, Luis Fernandez-Gil as Professor Alfonso Diaz, and Steven Michael Quezada as El Chingon
4	4	"The Eye Doesn't Lie"	Rhys Thomas & Alex Buono	Bill Hader & John Mulaney	The Thin Blue Line	September 10, 2015	0.09
An investigation into the wrongful conviction of a man sentenced to death for a 1976 murder. Guest cast: Gary Kraus as Detective Pettibone, Van Epperson as Detective Pomerance, Dale Dickey as Joelle Fellweather, Nathan Barnatt as Sign Spinner, Cedric Yarbrough as Pawn Shop Owner, and Deb Hiett as Marjorie Yoder.
5	5	"A Town, a Gangster, a Festival"	Rhys Thomas & Alex Buono	Seth Meyers & Fred Armisen	No known subject of parody	September 17, 2015	0.16
A documentary crew travels to Árborg, Iceland, for the annual festival honoring American gangster Al Capone. Guest cast: Aidy Bryant as Anne Severino, Þórunn Erna Clausen as Nina Karlsdóttir, Hannes Óli Ágústsson as Gunnar Brynjarsson
6–7	6–7	"Gentle & Soft: The Story of the Blue Jean Committee, Parts 1 & 2"	Rhys Thomas & Alex Buono	Fred Armisen, Bill Hader & Erik Kenward	History of the Eagles	September 24, 2015	0.11 (Part 1); 0.10 (Part 2)
A documentary charting the rise and fall of soft rock band The Blue Jean Committee. Guest cast: Irving Azoff as Alvin Izoff; Paula Pell as Patti Skrowaczeski; W. Earl Brown as Mitch Dragando; Jeff Doucette as Gordo; Cameron Crowe, Chuck Klosterman, Daryl Hall, Kenny Loggins, Haim, and Michael McDonald as themselves

=== Season 2 (2016) ===
Documentary Now! season 2 episodes
No. overall	No. in season	Title	Directed by	Written by	Subject parodied	Original release date	U.S. viewers (millions)
8	1	"The Bunker"	Rhys Thomas & Alex Buono	John Mulaney	The War Room	September 14, 2016	0.12
A behind-the-scenes view of Ben Herndon's 1992 run for governor of Ohio, focusing on his core campaign staff. Guest cast: Van Epperson as Ben Herndon, Wayne Federman as Mark Wiesel
9	2	"Juan Likes Rice & Chicken"	Rhys Thomas & Alex Buono	Seth Meyers	Jiro Dreams of Sushi	September 21, 2016	0.11
A look at the strict owner of a remote Colombian restaurant famed for its rice and chicken recipe, and the son he has tutored and hopes will take over for him some day. Guest cast: Hector Elias as Juan, Luis Fernando Hoyos as Diego, Harvey Guillén as Manuel, and David Chang and Jonathan Gold as themselves
10	3	"Parker Gail's Location Is Everything"	Rhys Thomas & Alex Buono	John Mulaney & Bill Hader	Swimming to Cambodia	September 28, 2016	0.11
Parker Gail performs a stream of consciousness monologue about the day he was kicked out of his New York City apartment. Guest cast: Peter Breitmayer as Male Parole Board Officer, Mike Damus as Dr. Jan, and Lennon Parham as Ramona
11	4	"Globesman"	Rhys Thomas & Alex Buono	Seth Meyers	Salesman	October 5, 2016	0.13
Four 1960s salesmen go door to door trying to sell globes to uninterested people. Guest cast: Gary Kraus as Regional Sales Manager Gus McMichaels, Tony Forsmark as Bob Campbell, Joe Howard as Dale Bingham, Bill Smitrovich as Mike Stankowicz, Linda Porter as Old Woman in Bed, and Kiff VandenHeuvel as Father of Hot Daughter
12	5	"Final Transmission"	Rhys Thomas & Alex Buono	Fred Armisen & Erik Kenward	Stop Making Sense, The Last Waltz & Big Time (one segment)	October 12, 2016	0.120
In 1987, new wave band Test Pattern plays its final concert. Guest cast: Maya Rudolph as Anita, Senon Williams as Guitarist / Percussion, Hal Willner as Oota Keirsha, Jon Wurster as Drummer, Tawny Newsome as Backup Singer #2, and Paul Thomas Anderson as the voice of Harrison Renzi
13–14	6–7	"Mr. Runner Up: My Life as an Oscar Bridesmaid, Parts 1 & 2"	Rhys Thomas & Alex Buono	John Mulaney & Bill Hader	The Kid Stays in the Picture	October 26, 2016	0.062 (Part 1); 0.090 (Part 2)
A candid docu-memoir of Hollywood legend Jerry Wallach and his 40-year quest to win an Academy Award. Guest cast: Peter Bogdanovich, Faye Dunaway, Mia Farrow, Peter Fonda, and Anne Hathaway as themselves; Benton Jennings as Rich Snooty Man; Sam Pancake as Ed Brulay; Jake Lucas as Steven Dumont; and Laura Bell Bundy as Bridget Bailey

=== Season 3 (2019) ===
Documentary Now! season 3 episodes
No. overall	No. in season	Title	Directed by	Written by	Subject parodied	Original release date	U.S. viewers (millions)
15–16	1–2	"Batsh*t Valley, Parts 1 & 2"	Alex Buono	Seth Meyers	Wild Wild Country & The Source Family	February 20, 2019	0.135 (Part 1); 0.135 (Part 2)
A cult disrupts the quiet town of Chinook, Oregon. Guest cast: Owen Wilson as Father Ra-Shawbard, Michael Keaton as FBI Agent Bill Doss, Necar Zadegan as Ra-Sharir, Gary Kraus as FBI Agent Larry Cooper, Van Epperson as Roger Smoot, Deb Hiett as Marge Middleton, and Connie Chung as herself
17	3	"Original Cast Album: Co-Op"	Alex Buono	John Mulaney & Seth Meyers	Original Cast Album: Company	February 27, 2019	0.103
The marathon studio recording session for the original cast album of the ill-fated 1970 Broadway musical Co-op, with songs detailing the joys and pains of a New York City housing cooperative. Guest cast: Taran Killam as Benedict Juniper, John Mulaney as Simon Sawyer, James Urbaniak as Howard Pine, Alex Brightman as Kenny, Richard Kind as Larry, Paula Pell as Patty, and Renée Elise Goldsberry as Dee Dee
18	4	"Waiting for the Artist"	Alex Buono & Rhys Thomas	Seth Meyers	Marina Abramović: The Artist Is Present	March 6, 2019	0.098
An internationally-acclaimed performance artist prepares for a major career retrospective while reconciling her relationship with her former lover and performance partner whom she hasn't seen in two decades. Guest cast: Cate Blanchett as Izabella Barta, Thierry Guetta as himself
19	5	"Searching for Mr. Larson: A Love Letter from the Far Side"	Alex Buono	Duffy Boudreau & Bill Hader	Dear Mr. Watterson	March 13, 2019	0.096
An obsessive fan of the comic strip The Far Side documents his quest to meet and interview its creator, Gary Larson.
20	6	"Long Gone"	Alex Buono & Rhys Thomas	Erik Kenward	Let's Get Lost	March 20, 2019	0.118
A profile of eccentric jazz guitarist Rex Logan. Guest cast: Natasha Lyonne as Carla Meola
21	7	"Any Given Saturday Afternoon"	Alex Buono	Zach Kanin & Tim Robinson	A League of Ordinary Gentlemen	March 27, 2019	0.090
When a defunct bowling league is revitalized, three of its most notable champions reunite to compete. Guest cast: Kevin Dunn as Rob Seger, Michael C. Hall as Billy May Dempsey, Tim Robinson as Rick Kenmore, and Bobby Moynihan as Larry Hawburger

=== Season 4 (2022) ===
Documentary Now! season 4 episodes
No. overall	No. in season	Title	Directed by	Written by	Subject parodied	Original release date	U.S. viewers (millions)
22–23	1–2	"Soldier of Illusion, Parts 1 & 2"	Alex Buono & Rhys Thomas	John Mulaney	Burden of Dreams, Grizzly Man, Into the Abyss, Little Dieter Needs to Fly, and My Best Fiend	October 19, 2022	N/A
A filmmaker shoots a documentary on the indigenous people of the Ular Mountains while simultaneously filming a sitcom pilot. Guest cast: Alexander Skarsgård as Rainer Wolz, Gana Bayarsaikhan as Masho, Kevin Bishop as Gary Jacks, Nicholas Braun as Kevin Butterman, and August Diehl as Dieter Daimler.
24	3	"Two Hairdressers in Bagglyport"	Alex Buono & Rhys Thomas	Seth Meyers	Three Salons at the Seaside and The September Issue	October 26, 2022	N/A
A fly-on-the-wall portrait of a hair salon in the small coastal town of Bagglyport as they prepare their annual stylebook. Guest cast: Cate Blanchett as Alice, Harriet Walter as Edwina
25	4	"How They Threw Rocks"	Alex Buono & Rhys Thomas	Seth Meyers	When We Were Kings	November 2, 2022	N/A
A chronicle of the 1974 showdown of the (fictional) Welsh sport of Craig Maes ("Field Rock" – akin to dodgeball but with rocks) dubbed "The Melon vs. The Felon" in the (fictional) village of Llagoelwyn on Wrst in Wales. Guest cast: Jonathan Pryce as Owen Teale-Griffith, John Rhys-Davies as Garth Davies-Gruffudd, Tom Jones as Bev Turner, Trystan Gravelle as Alwyn 'Allie' Lewis-Ifans
26	5	"My Monkey Grifter"	Alex Buono	Seth Meyers	My Octopus Teacher and Koko: A Talking Gorilla	November 9, 2022	N/A
A filmmaker (Jamie Demetriou) forms a deep, emotional, and financially taxing relationship with a monkey.
27	6	"Trouver Frisson"	Alex Buono & Micah Gardner	Matt Pacult & Tamsin Rawady	The Gleaners and I and The Beaches of Agnès	November 16, 2022	N/A
A celebrated French filmmaker searches for why she no longer experiences "frisson" – the goosebumps that have always been her guide. Guest cast: Liliane Rovère as Ida Leos, Ronald Guttman, Gary Kraus as Howie the Butcher, Verona Verbakel as Beatrice Lemutte, and Paola Zampierolo as young Ida Leos.

== Production ==
=== Background ===
The idea for the series was born out of a pre-tape short film from Saturday Night Live, where Armisen, Hader and Meyers were former cast members. In 2013, in a season 38 episode with Vince Vaughn, Armisen and Hader portrayed aging British punk rock stars in a sketch titled History of Punk: Ian Rubbish and the Bizzaros, written by Seth Meyers and Armisen. Hader has stated the biggest inspirations for the series were Woody Allen's mockumentary films Take the Money and Run (1969), and Zelig (1983). During the origins of Documentary Now! Hader sent DVD copies of the Allen films to Rhys Thomas and co-director Alex Buono. Hader said "I told them, 'This is the mood of the show: very serious, very dry, but with insane jokes and crazy moments. You don't want to wink too much at the audience."

=== Development ===
On March 20, 2014, it was announced that IFC had given the production, then titled American Documentary, a series order for a first season consisting of six episodes. Executive producers were set to include Lorne Michaels, Seth Meyers, Fred Armisen, and Bill Hader. Production companies involved with the series were slated to consist of Broadway Video and Rhys Thomas was expected to serve as director. The six-episode order limited the first season of the show, as Seth Meyers revealed in an interview with Collider, stating that they were not able to spoof Michael Moore documentaries, or the HBO documentary miniseries The Jinx: The Life and Deaths of Robert Durst. Meyers further explained saying, "The Jinx happened a little too late for us. We almost tried to pull it off. We talked a lot about that kind of documentary, where the filmmaker sets out to make a documentary, and then, very slowly, it becomes clear the documentary is about himself." The producers also declined to do another This Is Spinal Tap–type mockumentary and consciously avoided any similarities in editing or style. Armisen commented, "Spinal Tap set such a great precedent that we had to watch out for repeating any of those same beats. It's one of the greatest movies ever."

On July 31, 2015, it was announced at the Television Critics Association's annual summer press tour that Meyers, Hader and Armisen would serve as writers for the series and that additional executive producers would include Thomas and Andrew Singer. On August 18, 2015, it was reported that IFC had renewed the series for a second and third season. It was additionally reported that the series had been co-created by Thomas who was also expected to serve in the role of director along with Alex Buono. John Mulaney was slated to be a consulting producer and Erik Kenward a supervising producer. On August 27, 2015, it was announced that IFC had decided to delay the premiere of the series' second episode "DRONEZ: The Hunt for El Chingon" following the live broadcast of two television news station employees' murders in Virginia the previous day. The episode "Kunuk Uncovered", originally set to air as the series' third episode, was broadcast in its place.

On August 1, 2018, it was announced that the third season would premiere on February 20, 2019. Additionally, it was reported that one of the episodes would be titled "Waiting for the Artist" and parody the documentary film Marina Abramovic: The Artist is Present. Later that month, it was announced that another episode, entitled "Original Cast Album: Co-Op", would parody D. A. Pennebaker's 1970 documentary Original Cast Album: Company. On September 6, 2018, two further season three episodes were announced. One episode, titled "Any Given Saturday Afternoon", was described as a parody of the 2006 documentary A League of Ordinary Gentlemen and set to feature guest stars including Kevin Dunn, Michael C. Hall, Tim Robinson, and Bobby Moynihan. The other episode, titled "Long Gone", was described as a parody of the 1988 documentary Let's Get Lost and was expected to include Natasha Lyonne in a guest starring role. On October 10, 2018, it was announced that the season three premiere episode had been titled "Batsh*t Valley" and that it would be a parody of Wild Wild Country and The Source Family.

=== Casting ===
Alongside the series order announcement, it was confirmed that Fred Armisen and Bill Hader would star in the series. On August 1, 2018, it was announced that Cate Blanchett would guest star in the third-season episode "Waiting for the Artist" as Barta, a performance artist. Later that month, it was reported that Taran Killam, John Mulaney, James Urbaniak, Alex Brightman, Richard Kind, Paula Pell, and Renée Elise Goldsberry would appear in a third-season episode titled "Original Cast Album: Co-Op". On September 6, 2018, further season three guest stars were announced including Kevin Dunn, Michael C. Hall, Tim Robinson, and Bobby Moynihan in the episode "Any Given Saturday Afternoon" and Natasha Lyonne in the episode "Long Gone". On October 10, 2018, it was announced that Owen Wilson, Michael Keaton, and Necar Zadegan would guest star in the third-season premiere episode "Batsh*t Valley".

=== Filming ===
In season one, two of the episodes were shot in Iceland and "DRONEZ: The Hunt for El Chingon" was filmed in Tijuana. To film the second-season episode "Final Transmission", the Documentary Now! crew staged a real-life concert (attracting around 1,000 people) in which Armisen, Hader, and guest star Maya Rudolph performed as the Talking Heads–inspired band the episode centers around. The season three episode "Waiting for the Artist" was filmed in Budapest, Hungary in mid-2018.

== Release ==
=== Marketing ===
On January 17, 2019, the official trailer for season three was released.

=== Premieres ===
On January 27, 2019, the premiere of the third season was held at the Egyptian Theatre in Park City, Utah during the 2019 Sundance Film Festival. The premiere featured screenings of the episodes Waiting for the Artist and Original Cast Album: Co-Op.

In February 2022, the series' fourth season was announced and premiered on October 19, 2022.

In advance of their television broadcast, the episodes My Monkey Grifter, Two Hairdressers in Bagglyport and Trouver Frisson were premiered in the Documentary slate at the Toronto International Film Festival on September 9, 2022.

== Reception and legacy ==
=== Critical response ===
Critical reception of Documentary Now!
Season	Critical response	
Season	Rotten Tomatoes	Metacritic
1	90% (29 reviews)	79 (32 reviews)
2	93% (15 reviews)	74 (7 reviews)
3	100% (23 reviews)	88 (8 reviews)
4	100% (10 reviews)	82 (10 reviews)

==== Season 1 ====
The first season was received positively by critics upon its premiere. On the review aggregation website Rotten Tomatoes, the season holds a 90% approval rating, with an average rating of 7.89 out of 10 based on 29 reviews. The website's critical consensus reads, "Boasting a talented cast and smart writing, Documentary Now! is a clever send-up of non-fiction filmmaking, though some may find themselves outside the narrow scope of its humor." Metacritic, which uses a weighted average, assigned the season a score of 79 out of 100 based on 32 critics, indicating "generally favorable reviews".

In its year-end roundup, The New York Times named Documentary Now! as one of "The Best TV Shows of 2015". "This series, introduced in August," wrote Times critic Neil Genzlinger, "consists not of actual documentaries but of parodies of actual documentaries. It sure is funny, though."

==== Season 2 ====
The second season was met with a positive response from critics upon its premiere. On the review aggregation website Rotten Tomatoes, the season holds a 93% approval rating, with an average rating of 7.84 out of 10 based on 15 reviews. The website's critical consensus reads, "With extreme attention to detail, Documentary Now! furthers its hilarious tribute to vintage documentaries through showcasing creators Hader and Armisen's multi-talents, topped brilliantly with earnestly dramatic introductions by Dame Helen Mirren." Metacritic, which uses a weighted average, assigned the season a score of 74 out of 100 based on 7 critics, indicating "generally favorable reviews".

==== Season 3 ====
The third season was met with critical acclaim from critics upon its premiere. On the review aggregation website Rotten Tomatoes, the season holds a 100% approval rating, with an average rating of 9.29 out of 10 based on 23 reviews. The website's critical consensus reads, "Incisively critical of the genre and equally delighted by its subjects, Documentary Now! nails mockumentary under the deft direction of Rhys Thomas and Alex Buono." Metacritic, which uses a weighted average, assigned the season a score of 88 out of 100 based on 8 critics, indicating "universal acclaim".

==== Season 4 ====
The fourth season continued to receive critical acclaim. On Rotten Tomatoes, the season holds a 100% approval rating, with a critical consensus of: "Still sprightly while retaining its acerbic irreverence, Documentary Now! is an absolute treat for fans of documentary filmmaking and gut-busting comedy." Metacritic, which uses a weighted average, assigned the season a score of 82 out of 100 based on 10 critics, marking "universal acclaim". In Vanity Fair, Tara Ariano wrote: "Even a Documentary Now! episode that doesn't quite hit on all levels is a feast for the eyes; and at barely 23 minutes each, these episodes are extraordinarily intricate pieces of miniature art."

=== Awards and nominations ===
Award nominations for Documentary Now!
Year	Ceremony	Category	Nominee(s)	Result	Ref.
2016	Primetime Emmy Awards	Outstanding Variety Sketch Series	Documentary Now!	Nominated	
2016	Critics' Choice Television Awards	Best Actor in a Comedy Series	Bill Hader	Nominated	
2017	Writers Guild of America Awards	Comedy/Variety – Sketch Series	Fred Armisen, Bill Hader, Erik Kenward, John Mulaney, and Seth Meyers	Nominated	
2017	Primetime Emmy Awards	Outstanding Variety Sketch Series	Documentary Now!	Nominated	
2019	Primetime Emmy Awards	Outstanding Variety Sketch Series	Documentary Now!	Nominated	
2019	Primetime Emmy Awards	Outstanding Writing for a Variety Series	John Mulaney & Seth Meyers	Nominated	
2019	Primetime Emmy Awards	Outstanding Original Music and Lyrics	Eli Bolin, Seth Meyers, and John Mulaney for the song: "Holiday Party (I Did a Little Cocaine Tonight)", Original Cast Album: Co-Op	Nominated	
2019	Primetime Emmy Awards	Outstanding Directing for a Variety Series	Alex Buono & Rhys Thomas for Waiting for the Artist	Nominated	
2023	Peabody Awards	Entertainment	Broadway Video for IFC	Nominated	
2023	Hollywood Critics Association TV Awards	Best Actor in a Broadcast Network or Cable Limited or Anthology Series	Alexander Skarsgård	Won	
2023	Hollywood Critics Association TV Awards	Best Actress in a Broadcast Network or Cable Limited or Anthology Series	Cate Blanchett	Nominated	
2023	Hollywood Critics Association TV Awards	Best Directing in a Broadcast Network or Cable Limited or Anthology Series	Alex Buono and Rhys Thomas (for "Soldier of Illusion, Part 1")	Nominated	
2023	Hollywood Critics Association TV Awards	Best Writing in a Broadcast Network or Cable Limited or Anthology Series	John Mulaney (for "Soldier of Illusion, Part 1")	Won	
2023	Hollywood Critics Association Creative Arts TV Awards	Best Casting in a Limited Series or TV Movie	Documentary Now!	Nominated	

=== Home media ===
The first two seasons were released by Mill Creek Entertainment on DVD and Blu-ray on August 14, 2018, and the complete series was released on February 25, 2025. The episode "Globesman" was included as a bonus feature in the Criterion Collection Blu-ray release of Salesman, while "Original Cast Album: Co-Op" was included as a bonus feature in the Criterion Collection DVD and Blu-ray release for Original Cast Album: Company, with a reunion of the cast and crew of the episode included as an additional feature.

=== Soundtracks ===
Catalina Breeze, the album made by the fictitious Blue Jean Committee on the Season 1 two-parter Gentle and Soft: The Story of the Blue Jean Committee, was released by Drag City Records on November 20, 2015.

The soundtrack for the Season 3 episode Co-Op was made available as an actual cast album in 2019 alongside sheet music. Profits for the album were donated to Broadway Cares/Equity Fights AIDS.
