= Mallory Book =

Publication information
- Publisher: Marvel Comics
- First appearance: She-Hulk #1 (May 2004)
- Created by: Dan Slott

In-story information
- Species: Human
- Place of origin: Earth
- Team affiliations: Goodman, Lieber, Kurtzberg & Book (previously Goodman, Lieber, Kurtzberg & Holliway); Fourth Wall Enterprises
- Partnerships: Awesome Andy
- Notable aliases: The Face Who's Never Lost a Case

Mallory "Mal" Book is a fictional character appearing in American comic books published by Marvel Comics. She is depicted as a lawyer who is a rival of She-Hulk, and later the secret supervillain chairwoman of Fourth Wall Enterprises.

The character made her live-action debut in the Marvel Cinematic Universe series She-Hulk: Attorney at Law (2022), portrayed by Renée Elise Goldsberry.

== Publication history ==
The character first appeared in She-Hulk #1 (May 2004) and was created by Dan Slott.

== Fictional character biography ==
Mallory Book is a lawyer employed by Goodman, Lieber, Kurtzberg & Holliway. She is known for being beautiful and a tough defendant in court. She has garnered the nickname "The Face Who's Never Lost a Case", which does not intimidate Jennifer Walters. In her first appearance, Mallory shows disdain towards Jennifer having to step out as She-Hulk so she can save the world. In her next appearance, she represents a man who Doctor Strange had "wrongfully" captured. When the man is let go, Strange admits that he will be gunned down days later, shocking Mallory. Mallory begins working with Jen, but this does not change her opinion of her.

When Mallory represents Hercules, who has caused considerable physical injury to Constrictor, in court, Jen suggests that Hercules settle and pay damages. While being reprimanded by the law firm's senior partners for losing the case, Mallory is seriously injured when Titania attacks the firm and attempts to kill Jen.

As Mallory recovers from the attack, Awesome Andy secretly assists her with physical training and develops a crush on her. Mallory starts defending villains in court, representing Ox and Boomerang against Young Avengers Stature and Vision. This angers Jen, who felt that representing villains is ethically wrong.

Mallory begins falling for the Two-Gun Kid, but comes under the influence of Starfox's powers, forcing her to fall in love with Awesome Andy instead. Andy copies Starfox's powers, thus continuing to influence Mallory into loving him. When Mallory learns that she has been manipulated, Andy becomes guilty and stops influencing her. Mallory becomes furious with Andy, demanding he stay away from her.

Mallory takes revenge on Jen by when she takes on the defense of the Leader, Samuel Sterns, and subpoenas Jen to testify for his defense. On the stand, Mallory forces Jen to list all her sexual encounters as She-Hulk to both humiliate her and build a defense for Sterns that gamma-radiated superhumans have no control over their actions. Mallory's successful defense of Sterns results in her being made a partner of the firm, and she seems to make peace with Jen.

Mallory assigns Jen the defense of Arthur Moore, a supervillain named 'Dark Art' whom Jen subsequently assaults as She-Hulk after Moore shows her false illusions of him murdering children, resulting in Mallory being furious with Jen and accepting her resignation from the firm. Mallory is ultimately revealed to be the supervillain chairwoman of Fourth Wall Enterprises, seeking to bring an end to all metafictional beings. Having gained Jen's respect, Mallory elects to temporarily shut down the She-Hulk Project due to the cancellation of the ongoing She-Hulk title, with her board speculating she will resume her plans once a new ongoing She-Hulk series featuring her is commissioned, lest "Book's cancelled" become a reality.

== In other media ==
Mallory Book appears in She-Hulk: Attorney at Law, portrayed by Renée Elise Goldsberry. This version works in the same law office as Jennifer Walters. She is not as malicious as her comics counterpart, slowly becoming friends with Walters when she declares her as her best friend.
