= She-Hulk =

Comic book superhero

Jennifer Walters She-Hulk
- Various incarnations of She-Hulk, as depicted in She-Hulk (vol. 5) #4 (2022). Art by Russell Dauterman.

Publication information
- Publisher: Marvel Comics
- First appearance: The Savage She-Hulk #1 (November 1979)
- Created by: Stan Lee; John Buscema

In-story information
- Full name: Jennifer Susan Walters (Note: Her middle name was revealed to be Sue in 1984's The Avengers Annual #13. In Heralds (2010) #1, Emma Frost refers to her as "Jennifer Susan Walters".)
- Species: Human mutate
- Team affiliations: Avengers; Ancient Order of the Shield; A-Force; Defenders; Fantastic Force; Fantastic Four; Fearsome Four; Future Foundation; Heroes for Hire; Hulkbusters; The Initiative; Lady Liberators; Mighty Avengers; S.H.I.E.L.D.; Seven Brides Of Set
- Partnerships: Hulk
- Notable aliases: She-Hulk; Sensational She-Hulk; Savage She-Hulk; Agent Walters; Jen
- Abilities: Transformation; Superhuman strength, stamina, durability, speed, and leaping; Healing factor; Self-Resurrection; Emotion empowerment; Energy absorption; Explosion generation; Fourth wall awareness; Expertise in criminology and martial arts

She-Hulk (Jennifer Susan Walters) is a character appearing in American comic books published by Marvel Comics. Created by writer Stan Lee and artist John Buscema, she first appeared in The Savage She-Hulk #1 (November 1979). Walters is a lawyer who, after an assassination attempt, received an emergency blood transfusion from her cousin, Bruce Banner, and acquired a milder version of his Hulk condition: Walters becomes a large, powerful, green-hued version of herself. Unlike Banner in his Hulk form, Walters largely retains her normal personality in her She-Hulk form, in particular most of her intelligence and emotional control. Furthermore, though she is much taller in her She-Hulk form, Walters's body mass is just as dense as that of her normal human self. In any case, like Hulk, She-Hulk is still susceptible to outbursts of anger and becomes much stronger when enraged. In later series, her transformation is permanent, and she often breaks the fourth wall for humorous effect and running gags, as the first major Marvel character to do so frequently, ahead of the more famous fourth wall breaker Deadpool.

She-Hulk has been a member of the Avengers, S.H.I.E.L.D., Defenders, Fantastic Four, Heroes for Hire, and Fantastic Force at various points in her history. As a highly skilled lawyer who became a superhero by accident, she frequently leverages her legal and personal experience to serve as legal counsel to various superheroes and other superhumans.

She-Hulk has been described as one of Marvel's most notable and powerful female heroes. Since her original introduction in comics, the character has been featured in various other Marvel-licensed products, including video games, animated television series, and merchandise. Walters made her live-action debut in the Marvel Cinematic Universe (MCU) with the Disney+ original series She-Hulk: Attorney at Law (2022), portrayed by Tatiana Maslany.

== Publication history ==
First appearance of the She-Hulk from the first issue of her title, The Savage She-Hulk #1 (November 1979). Art by John Buscema.

She-Hulk was created by Stan Lee, who wrote only the first issue, and was the last character he created for Marvel Comics, until his return to comics with Ravage 2099 in 1992. The reason behind the character's creation had to do with the success of The Incredible Hulk (1977–1982) and The Bionic Woman television series, both from Universal Television. Marvel was afraid that the show's executives might suddenly introduce a female version of the Hulk, as producer Kenneth Johnson had already done with The Six Million Dollar Man. So Marvel decided to publish their own version of such a character to make sure that, if a similar one appeared in the television series, Marvel would own the rights. Kenneth Johnson later said the plans for season five of The Incredible Hulk was to have Banner's sister suffering from a disease where only the blood of a sibling could save her life, which would turn her into a "woman Hulk who was crazy and scary and dangerous". But six episodes into the season, a new boss at CBS decided to cancel the show with immediate effect, ending the last season with episode seven.

All but the first issue of The Savage She-Hulk were written by David Anthony Kraft and penciled by Mike Vosburg, and most issues were inked by Frank Springer. Vosburg later remarked, "The oddest thing about that book was that Frank drew really beautiful women, I drew really beautiful women, and yet, the She-Hulk was never overly attractive." The Savage She-Hulk series lasted until 1982, where it ended with #25 (March 1982). She-Hulk then made guest appearances in other characters' books. Her earliest guest-starring adventures followed no specific story line, besides her recurring bad luck with automobiles. She-Hulk also appeared in the limited series, Marvel Super Hero Contest of Champions (June to August 1982), in which numerous superheroes are kidnapped from Earth to fight in space.

She-Hulk becomes a member of the Avengers in Avengers #221 (July 1982). Her early Avengers appearances continued the running gag about her car troubles. She-Hulk also made occasional guest appearances in The Incredible Hulk. Her appearance in The Avengers #233 (July 1983) was drawn by John Byrne, who would later become strongly associated with the character.

At the conclusion of the first Secret Wars miniseries, She-Hulk joins the Fantastic Four (Fantastic Four #265 (April 1984)). During She-Hulk's tenure with the Fantastic Four, she appeared in Marvel Graphic Novel #16: The Aladdin Effect, Marvel Graphic Novel #17: Revenge of the Living Monolith, and Marvel Graphic Novel #18: The Sensational She-Hulk. All three graphic novels appeared in 1985. The last, #18, appearing in November 1985, was written and illustrated by then-Fantastic Four writer/artist John Byrne.

She-Hulk regained a solo series in 1989, The Sensational She-Hulk (maintaining the 1985 graphic novel's title). The Sensational She-Hulk ran for 60 issues. Issues #1–8, 31–46, and 48–50 were written and drawn by Byrne. Byrne's She-Hulk stories satirized comic books and introduced She-Hulk's awareness that she is a comic book character. Two issues tested the limits of the Comics Code: #34 makes reference to the 1991 Vanity Fair cover in which actress Demi Moore appeared nude and pregnant (She-Hulk's version has her holding a green beach ball to imitate Moore's pregnancy). In issue #40, She-Hulk is depicted jumping rope (apparently) in the nude, with her breasts and genital area covered by blur lines; the cover of the same issue shows her covering herself with a form sporting the lines "Approved [...] Comics Code". Other writers to contribute to this series include Steve Gerber (#10, 11 and 13–23), Simon Furman, and Peter David.

During The Sensational She-Hulk, the character continued making numerous guest appearances. In 1990, She-Hulk appeared in the two-issue limited series She-Hulk: Ceremony, adapted from a Dwayne McDuffie pitch for a cancelled She-Hulk romantic comedy ongoing series.

The Sensational She-Hulk ran until issue #60 (February 1994), making it the longest-running solo title of any Marvel superheroine up to that point. After the cancellation of She-Hulk's second solo series, she continued making backup, one-shot, and team appearances in Fantastic Force (starting with issue #13 in November 1995), the 1996 miniseries Doc Samson #1–4 (January–April 1996), Heroes for Hire #8–19 (February 1998 through the series finale in January 1999), and The Avengers. Her next major appearance was in the May 2002 one-shot titled Thing and She-Hulk: The Long Night.

In May 2004, She-Hulk was given a new title and launched in a wave of six new Marvel books. Despite favorable critical notices, the new series could not escape the low sales numbers that the titles received from their initial cluster-style launch. Marvel brought the series to a close with #12 and promised a re-launch of the title (as a "second season") eight months later. The eight-month gap is alluded to in the body of the story itself.

With the original creative team (Dan Slott and Juan Bobillo) from the previous series, the book returned eight months later as promised in October 2005. The third issue was billed as the 100th issue of a She-Hulk comic book, and had story art by numerous artists, including Vosburg. There was no new artwork by Buscema or Byrne, who were represented by reprints of The Sensational She-Hulk #1 and The Savage She-Hulk #1.

Dan Slott's last issue is #21; with 33 issues, Slott has written the most solo issues of She-Hulk. Peter David became the new writer with She-Hulk #22. Marvel Comics announced that She-Hulk #38 (February 2009) would be the final issue of the series. Peter David commented on his blog that sales of the book were hurt due to discrepancies between his book and Jeph Loeb's Hulk series, caused by editorial error:

I didn't even know she WAS going to be in Hulk. Had I known, I probably would have done things differently. As it was, there were thousands of readers who were not saying, "Gee, they're portraying her wrong in "Hulk." Instead they were saying, "Why should we care about her hero's journey in her own title when she's obviously gotten over her hostility toward Stark over in Hulk?

The mantle of She-Hulk is challenged by Lyra, the daughter of Hulk and Thundra, who is the lead character in All-New Savage She-Hulk, a miniseries written by Fred Van Lente.

She-Hulk appeared in FF by Matt Fraction and Mike Allred, which debuted in November 2012.

An ongoing She-Hulk series, written by Charles Soule and drawn by Javier Pulido, debuted in 2014. It was revealed in October 2014 that Soule and Pulido's run of She-Hulk, which had the character facing off against Matt Murdock in court, would end with issue 12.

Since May 2015, She-Hulk appeared as one of the main characters in A-Force, an all-female Avengers spin-off launched by G. Willow Wilson, Marguerite Bennett, and Jorge Molina during Marvel's Secret Wars crossover.

She-Hulk starred in the comic titled Hulk beginning December 2016. The series showed how she dealt with the trauma stemming from her cousin's death, and the injuries sustained at the hands of Thanos, as fallout from the Civil War II event. She appeared colored grey, similar to Hulk's "Joe Fixit" persona, and there were great differences in tone from her previous lighthearted adventures. The title was cancelled with issue #163 in March 2018.

In 2022, She-Hulk returned as an ongoing series by writer Rainbow Rowell and artist Rogê Antônio. The series returns to the lighthearted tone of the previous comics and focuses on She-Hulk's return to practicing law. The series ended in 2024 with 25 issues over 2 volumes.

== Fictional character biography ==
=== The Savage She-Hulk ===
Jennifer Walters as the She-Hulk during her debut in The Savage She-Hulk #1 (November 1979). Art by John Buscema.

Jennifer Walters, the cousin of Bruce Banner (Hulk), is the small and somewhat shy daughter of Los Angeles County Sheriff William Morris Walters and Elaine (née Banner) Walters (who died in a car crash when Jennifer was 17). Operatives of Nicholas Trask, a crime boss who had crossed paths with her father, shot and seriously wounded her on the day that Banner visited her to tell her about his transformation into the Hulk. Since no other donors with her blood type were available, Banner provided his blood for a transfusion; as they already shared the same blood type and DNA, his gamma-irradiated blood, combined with the adrenaline from emotional stress, transformed Jennifer into the green-skinned She-Hulk when the mobsters tried to finish her off at the hospital. She then used her new powers to take down Trask, who was killed when the earth-boring device he rode malfunctioned, plunging him into the molten core of the Earth.

As She-Hulk, Jennifer possessed powers similar to those of her cousin, though at a reduced level. She also possessed a less monstrous, more Amazonian appearance. Initially, anger triggered the transformation to her She-Hulk form (as with Bruce Banner's). Like her cousin Bruce, his counterpart, the Leader, Doc Samson and most other persons mutated by exposure to gamma radiation over the years, her mutated form was originally explained as being molded by her subconscious desire to look like the ideal woman. She eventually gains control of her transformations when Michael Morbius cures her of a lethal blood disease. As a criminal defense lawyer, she defended Morbius when he was tried for serial murder and managed to reduce the conviction to involuntary manslaughter, considering his medical condition.

Jennifer eventually decides to permanently retain her She-Hulk form, feeling that it not only makes her a better lawyer, but also gives her an assertiveness and confidence that she never had as a human. After her brief solo career, she joined the Avengers. This led to her being transported to Battleworld by the Beyonder and her participation in the Secret Wars, which is most notable for sparking her long-standing rivalry with Titania. After the heroes returned to Earth, she temporarily replaced the Thing (who, having been repeatedly de-powered during the event, opted to stay in Battleworld for some time as a form of soul-searching) as a member of the Fantastic Four.

During her tenure with the Fantastic Four, She-Hulk met and started a romance with Wyatt Wingfoot. One day, she had to prevent a radiation leak in a downed S.H.I.E.L.D. Helicarrier. This radiation exposure drastically affected Jennifer: she could no longer transform back into her original human form. However, this was an agreeable turn of events for her, since she preferred being She-Hulk, and it was revealed much later by Leonard Samson and Reed Richards that the block was psychological.

=== The Sensational She-Hulk ===
After her Fantastic Four years, She-Hulk rejoined the Avengers for a while. She becomes an assistant district attorney and begins working for New York City district attorney Blake Tower.

After a time, She-Hulk returns to the Avengers. Repeated exposure to the presence of her teammate Jack of Hearts, who has the innate ability to absorb radiation that is around him, leads to She-Hulk being unable to control her transformations. After realizing that she becomes a feral monster when transforming into She-Hulk, Jennifer flees out of fear that she will endanger her friends and others, leading to the "Search for She-Hulk" storyline.

She is found by the Avengers in Bone, Idaho, and she has a fight with the Hulk, before Jack of Hearts arrives and transfers the radiation back into her body, giving Jennifer back control of her She-Hulk form. Following the deaths of Jack of Hearts and Scott Lang, the Scarlet Witch magically caused She-Hulk to become savage once again and to tear the Vision in half.

=== Single Green Female ===
The events of The Search for She-Hulk, combined with her own lack of personal responsibility and the potential legal ramifications of her superheroics swaying juries, leads Jennifer back to the legal profession when she is offered a partnership in the New York firm of Goodman, Lieber, Kurtzberg & Holliway (GLK&H), which plans to establish a "Superhuman Law" division. As part of the offer, Jennifer agrees to revert back into her human form while practicing law.

Her experiences at GLK&H change Jennifer's worldview significantly; she now realizes that as Jennifer Walters and She-Hulk, she has much to offer the world in both forms. She also learns that her powers as She-Hulk are dependent on her own physical abilities and takes up bodybuilding to raise her strength to a previously unimaginable level.

=== "Civil War" ===
During the 2006 "Civil War" storyline, in which the superhero community became divided over the ethics of the Superhuman Registration Act, She-Hulk decides to obey the law and register. She also supports Tony Stark (Iron Man), but as an attorney she advises individuals on both sides of the conflict. She begins a relationship with John Jameson, and the pair elope. In She-Hulk #14 (2006), Jennifer is drafted into S.H.I.E.L.D, where she has to fight foes of the Hulk while training the Hulkbusters under the Initiative.

=== "World War Hulk" ===
When Jennifer begins to search for information on the Hulk's disappearance, Tony Stark has her secretly injected with S.P.I.N. (Super-Power-Inhibiting Nanobots) Technology, removing her powers. The now powerless Jennifer is approached by Amadeus Cho, a young genius out who knows what Illuminati did to the Hulk, and he wants help in finding him. Cho temporarily restores Jennifer's powers and says he can permanently restore Jennifer's powers if she will join him, but she politely refuses, instead directing him to Hercules and Angel.

During the 2007 "World War Hulk" storyline, a re-powered She-Hulk assists in the evacuation of Manhattan. Following these events, Jennifer returns to the law firm to work on suing Tony Stark for stealing her powers, which he is now able to control.

=== Post-"World War Hulk" ===
Reed Richards restores Jennifer's powers by purging the nanites from her body with a device that aligned Jennifer with an alternate reality version.

She was later recruited by Stark as a member of an Initiative-sponsored incarnation of the Defenders for a short while until Tony Stark disbanded the team. Afterwards, she continued to aid team leader Nighthawk for a brief time until she was fully able to join the team on Nighthawk's request and that it would be away from the Initiative.

She-Hulk later aids the Lady Liberators in distributing aid packages to victims of an earthquake.

As part of the 2008 - 09 "Dark Reign" storyline, Jennifer appears in the four-issue miniseries All-New Savage She-Hulk, in which she fights Lyra, and later Sentry.

=== "Incredible Hulks" ===
Following the defeat of the Intelligencia, Jennifer begins traveling with Hulk, Skaar, Korg, Rick Jones, and Betty Ross. Shortly after the events of World War Hulks, Skaar learns that his brother Hiro-Kala is approaching and that he intends to crash the planet K'ai into Earth. She-Hulk is on the team as they manage to successfully avert disaster. Upon returning to Earth, the group finds the world in flames as it is in the grasp of the Chaos War. Jennifer and Lyra settle in New York, with Jennifer attempting to integrate Lyra into society. They are also involved in trying to round up the remaining members of the Intelligencia.

Prior to a time- and multiverse-spanning trip by the Fantastic Four and family, the Thing asks She-Hulk to be a member of the Future Foundation. She is also tasked with holding a gamma-radiation cure by Doc Green, a version of the Hulk with Banner's intellect.

=== "Civil War II" and return to law ===
During the 2016 "Civil War II" storyline, She-Hulk is mortally wounded by a direct attack from Thanos. She later recovers.

Following Bruce Banner's funeral, Jennifer Walters left the superhero business and continued to work as a lawyer. Due to the stress following the fight with Thanos, Jennifer started turning uncontrollably into her version of the Grey Hulk at different intervals. She begins teaming up with Patsy Walker (Hellcat).

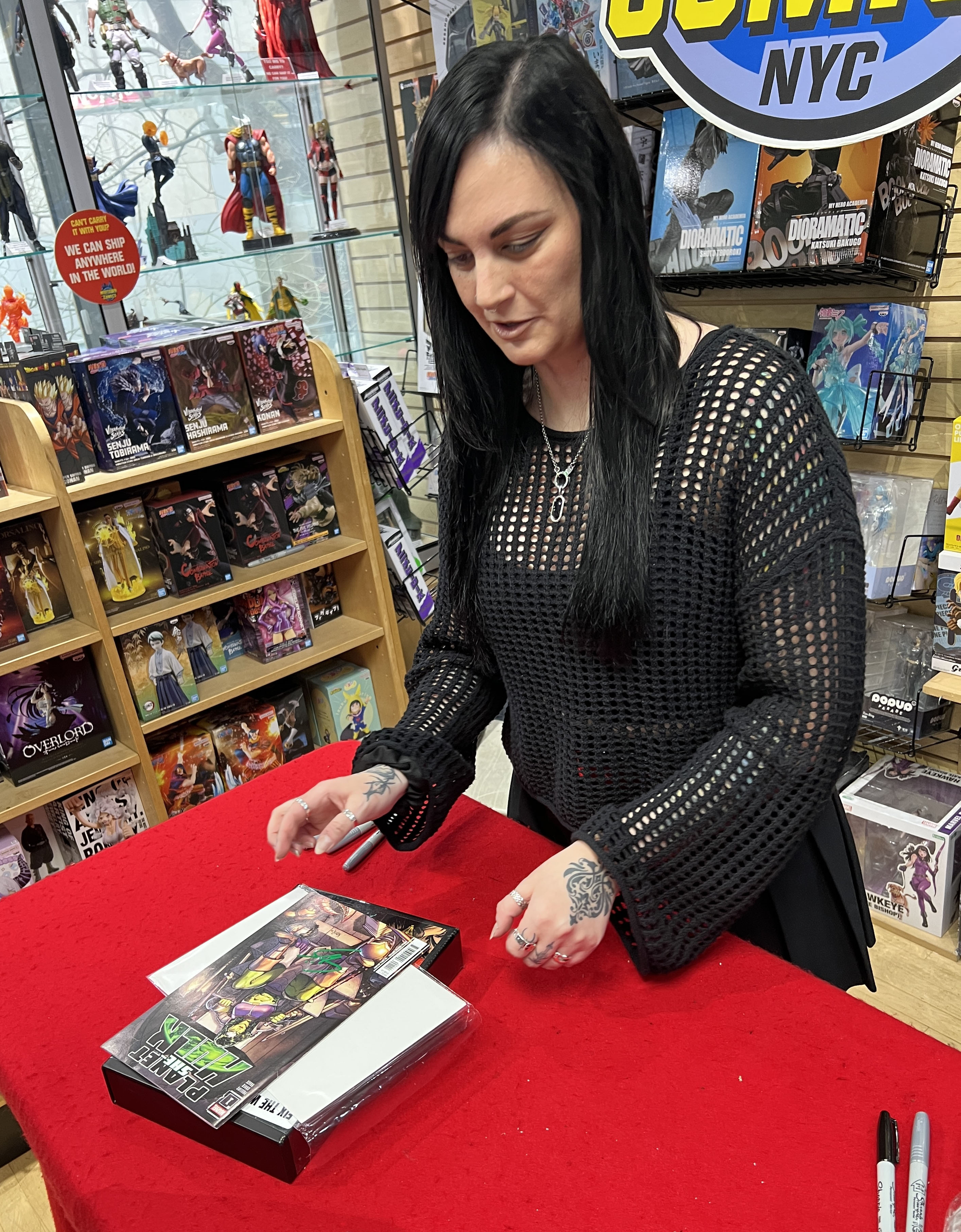
Writer Stephanie Phillips autographing a copy of Planet She-Hulk at an April 2026 signing at Midtown Comics in Manhattan

Following a confrontation with the leader, Jennifer seeks help and is given a pill to enter her subconscious, allowing her to confront her Hulk persona and illusions of Thanos and Banner, finally overcoming her trauma in the process. Upon waking, Jennifer reverts to her standard green She-Hulk persona.

During the "Empyre" storyline, She-Hulk is revealed to have been killed and replaced by a Cotati, attacking the Avengers when they tried to negotiate a truce with their new enemy. She-Hulk is able to break the Cotati off of her and to stop the fighting between the Kree and the Skrull. When the Cotati are defeated, She-Hulk and Thor take Sequoia away. It turns out that She-Hulk was able to return to life thanks to her connection to One Below All.

=== Dating Jack of Hearts ===
After Jennifer managed to get her mind back in order, she returns to her career, becoming legal representation and counselling for other superhumans alongside Mallory Book, and Awesome Andy. Jennifer's friend Janet gifts her an apartment, she makes peace with Titania and enters romantic relationship with her old teammate Jack of Hearts. A pair of gamma-mutated scientists however send Jack of Hearts powers haywire, meaning he would continue to drain Jennifer's abilities, putting the relationship on hold.

== Characterization ==
=== Powers and abilities ===
A transfusion of gamma-irradiated blood from her cousin Bruce Banner (the Hulk) granted Jennifer Walters superhuman powers. In her She-Hulk form, she possesses enormous superhuman strength, that potentially makes her the physically strongest known woman in the Marvel Universe when her emotional state is sufficiently high. She-Hulk is exponentially stronger than her Jennifer Walters form; therefore any extra strength gained as a human through intense physical training will be amplified, making her She-Hulk form even stronger and larger. This is showcased after her defeat and later victory over the Champion of the Universe. Due to the Hulk's wish, Jennifer is able to switch between her human and Hulk forms at will.

Similarly to her cousin, her powers can also greatly increase by absorbing radiation. She is capable of absorbing and redirecting great amounts of energy.

Although She-Hulk's strength originally remained at a set level and did not increase, later in her history her strength has been stated to increase further from fear, or anger, similarly to her cousin. In addition the character possesses superhuman speed, agility, stamina, and reflexes. She-Hulk's body is superhumanly durable and nearly impervious to force, pain, and disease. She-Hulk has a strong healing factor, and is functionally immortal due to her connection to the One Below All.

==== Former powers ====
- She-Hulk received a power upgrade from the Celestial Eson, and became more powerful than ever before, far surpassing Captain Marvel and Thor (without the Odinforce) in strength. The additional radiation also gave her stronger, more varied ways of directing it at foes. She was described as a living gamma bomb, capable of creating huge explosions, "beyond what even Hulk can produce". She also described herself as an Omega level threat, and claimed that the Starbrand is one of Earth's inherent defense systems, much like herself. In this state, a Cotati-possessed She-Hulk nearly killed the Thing with her bare hands and punched through the Invisible Woman's force fields.
- Due to training from the alien Ovoids, She-Hulk is able to swap powers and physiques with other human women, but retains her green skin pigmentation, and only used it once.
- A hex cast by the Scarlet Witch made anyone who wished She-Hulk harm unable to recognize her as Jennifer, but harmful side effects forced Jennifer to seek the assistance of Doctor Strange to remove the hex.
- Jennifer has briefly possessed the powers of Iron Fist and the Phoenix Force.

==== Skills ====
She-Hulk is a formidable hand-to-hand combatant, having been trained by Captain America and Gamora, and is capable of skillfully using various acupressure points in combat situations to render opponents unconscious. She is also a skilled pilot.

She-Hulk is an experienced attorney who attended the UCLA School of Law, where she was a member of the Order of the Coif, a national merit society for top legal scholars. She-Hulk had performed legal work as a member of the Magistrati, who had the power to compel her to adjudicate cases anywhere in creation. She ceased to operate in this function after successfully adjudicating the merits of her own universe to continue existing (opposed by the Ultimate Marvel Universe) before the Living Tribunal.

=== Personality ===
Walters' personality has changed over the decades since her first appearance: originally ill-tempered and violent, she is now depicted as a fun-loving, extremely kind, empathetic, yet still feisty woman who frequently uses humor when fighting. She has stated that she does not want to kill her foes, especially ones that she has already subdued. She has also started and led her own disaster relief organization, and felt great remorse for almost destroying a small town (due to her transformed state briefly turning uncontrollable from radiation), whereupon she helped construction workers to rebuild it.

As a highly idealistic lawyer, Walters has a history of defending the rights of minorities, the mentally ill, individuals victimized by unethical corporations, criminals who were unduly mistreated and lacked a proper defense, and civil liberties generally; she also believes in the necessity of law and order. These priorities have sometimes made her personally conflicted: she reversed her stance regarding the Superhuman Registration Act, and expressed disillusionment when her more famous cousin (whom she considers a brother) was shot into space without due process, or when what she thought to be a torturer and murderer of children was cleared from all charges.

Jennifer possesses extremely strong willpower and determination, notably resisting weeks of torture and brainwashing by the Red Widow without breaking in the slightest.

When the Time Variance Authority put She-Hulk on trial to potentially erase her from history, Bruce Banner testified that, as a curse on himself and humanity, there are days when he feels like the only thing that has made his life worthwhile is that he did not only save the life of somebody he loves when he gave Jennifer his blood, but also had a hand in creating a genuine hero.

In an interview, former She-Hulk writer Peter David described her as follows:

She-Hulk has the potential to be our Wonder Woman. A powerful female with a strong moral center and a determination to do what's right. She's also a unique combination of brains and brawn. The ideal She-Hulk story is one that plays on both aspects of her make-up, the intelligence combined with her strength.

Unlike Hulk, Jennifer's personality and intelligence are less affected when she transforms into She-Hulk, although she becomes more self-confident and assertive. In court it was proven that her mutated form also has fewer inhibitions, as proven during a trial for the Leader; for example, while Jennifer Walters has only had a few sexual partners, reading back a list of She-Hulk's conquests took considerable time. For a long time, She-Hulk could not revert to her original human form, but that turned out to be psychosomatic due to her not actually wanting to.

=== Breaking the fourth wall ===
Cover to Sensational She-Hulk #31, on which She-Hulk interacts with John Byrne and editor Renée Witterstaetter

For a time, starting with the Sensational She-Hulk series by John Byrne in 1989, She-Hulk was portrayed with a form of "cross-dimensional" or metafictional awareness to break the fourth wall. In some stories, she showed an awareness of being a comic book character, with visuals of her "tearing the page" or "walking through a page of advertisements" to reach an enemy's control center. She sometimes engaged in arguments with the writer (John Byrne), or appealed to the comic's editor, Renée Witterstaetter. The Sensational She-Hulk #50 (Byrne's last issue) involved Renée locking a bound-and-gagged Byrne in a storage closet while she and Jen tried to find the book's new writer. This trend was briefly carried on during her tenure with the Heroes for Hire, when she "spoke" to the book's narrator and "fired" him for losing the plot. Other Marvel characters that have been written to directly "address" the audience include She-Hulk's friend Louise Mason, Uatu the Watcher (who narrates a majority of the issues of What If by speaking directly to the reader), and Deadpool. On occasion, this practice has also been used for Loki, Rick Jones, Wyatt Wingfoot, and Howard the Duck. The Dan Slott series has not acknowledged this primarily-humor-based quirk of She-Hulk's, save for a coda in vol. 2 #3 (#100), in which Stu Cicero, a law firm "researcher" asks Jen if she can "really do stuff like that." She somewhat wistfully replies "No. I can't" – however, the panel is drawn at a somewhat ambiguous angle that suggests She-Hulk may be looking "out" of the comic at the reader. She-Hulk's most recent profile in the Official Handbook of the Marvel Universe continues to list this "ability" of hers, and confirms that she is simply downplaying it for the benefit of those around her.

The Dan Slott series took a different approach to the metafiction angle, making use of a concept dating back to Lee and Kirby's early Fantastic Four – that the heroes of the Marvel Universe permit licensed comic-book adaptations of their adventures to be published. Since all comics published before 2001 bear the seal of the Comics Code Authority of America (a federal agency in the Marvel Universe), they are considered legal documents admissible as evidence in the superhuman law cases on which She-Hulk works.

In much more recent appearances She-Hulk has demonstrated that she still has the ability to exit her narrative and talk directly with her readers.

=== Relationships ===
In early appearances, Jennifer's key relationship was with her father, Sheriff Morris Walters. The relationship between the two is awkward due to Jennifer's career path in defending criminals. Their relationship is further complicated when she becomes a vigilante as She-Hulk. During this time, Jennifer remained close to a childhood friend, Zapper, and pursued a short relationship with Richard Rory. She began seeing Zapper after Rory, but this fell apart, primarily due to her insistence on permanently remaining in her She-Hulk form, which he felt repressed her true self.

During her time as an Avenger, She-Hulk engaged in a relationship with Starfox. This encounter was later retold in flashback, and in that storyline, Starfox was on trial, charged with sexually assaulting a married woman, using his euphoria power. Jennifer assumed her relationship with Starfox had not been consensual after hearing this testimony, after which she severely beat him. However, she later discovered that Starfox had not used his powers on her, and that his brother Thanos had manipulated his mind to make him use his powers recklessly and plant falsely incriminating memories there.

She-Hulk was briefly engaged to Wyatt Wingfoot, whom she first met during her tenure with the Fantastic Four.

She later was married to John Jameson, whom she first met while he was the Man-Wolf in a Microverse adventure in The Savage She-Hulk. The two precipitously eloped in Las Vegas. The pairs roommate Pug deduced that She-Hulk's strengthened feelings for Jameson were the result of manipulation by Starfox. The influence was removed and the marriage was annulled due to the unsure nature of their union. John however, was never influenced, and his love for Jennifer was confirmed.

She-Hulk has had brief relationships or flings with Luke Cage, Clay Quartermain, Hercules, and Tony Stark, as well as a longer relationship with Thor. While an alternate universe Jennifer visited the main Jennifer's universe, the alternate version slept with the Juggernaut.

A notable modern romantic relationship of She-Hulk's is with fellow Avenger Jack of Hearts. Due to the nature of his power absorption abilities, the relationship has been based solely on love and trust.

She-Hulk has many friends in the superhuman community. Her most notable friendships are with Patsy Walker and Janet van Dyne.

She has had rivalries with Titania as a superhero and Mallory Book as a lawyer.

=== Appearance and costumes ===
She-Hulk is immediately recognizable due to her size, green skin, and long, dark green, almost black hair. She has transformed into a grey version for brief stints.

In her first appearance, She-Hulk was a massive, towering figure, with wild hair, in a ripped white dress. After her Savage era, She-Hulk wore appropriately sized clothes. She joined the Avengers and began dressing in a one-piece aerobics outfit, and then a purple, one-piece swimsuit with a white belt and boots (a color scheme that would be a recurring motif for the character). As a lawyer or in her human form, Jennifer either wears business suits or fashionable dresses.

As a member of the Fantastic Four, she donned a blue and white costume in the 1980s and a blue and red costume in the 2010s. After leaving the Fantastic Four in the 1980s, she rejoined the Avengers, donning a white one-piece costume with the blue Avengers insignia emblazoned on it. In Immortal She-Hulk, she was redesigned with an outfit similar to sports wear, with purple and black shorts, a sports bra and fingerless gloves.

== Cultural impact and legacy ==
=== Critical response ===
Jenna Anderson of ComicBook.com wrote, "Although she has had a slew of different comic interpretations over the years, John Byrne's take on her in The Sensational She-Hulk is often regarded as the most iconic – both for further developing her as a character, and for satirizing the comic book tropes of the time. In the decades since, She-Hulk has consistently remained spirited and feisty, but also incredibly intelligent, empathetic, and altruistic, both in her life as a superhero and as a lawyer." Deidre Kaye of Scary Mommy called She-Hulk a "role model" and a "truly heroic" female character. Peyton Hinckle of ComicsVerse referred to She-Hulk as a female role model, saying, "As a strong, self-confident woman who completely ignores female stereotypes, she's the kind of character more people — especially younger readers — need to see. She happily accepts the things that make her different and she doesn't try to hide herself just because others disapprove. She struggles with things too, but at the end of the day, she proves that with the right thinking, anything is possible. For male and female comic readers alike, that's an important message."

Alyssa Rosenberg of The Washington Post called She-Hulk a "feminist superhero," stating, "From the very start, She-Hulk was recognizable as a manifestation of a particularly female dilemma that persists today. She is an expression of how terrific it would be not to have to censor yourself, to be allowed to be angry without some man declaring you unladylike. [...] She-Hulk is not a male fantasy of how sexual liberation works, where women focus more on making men happy than on their own pleasure. Rather, she is an adventuress with a clear sense of her own gratification and joy." UGO Networks included She-Hulk in their "Best Heroes of All Time" list, writing, "There's nothing that's a cheap cross-marketing ploy about She-hulk [...] If nothing else, she has proven to have a longer shelf life than Spider-Woman (who is also in no way a cheap marketing ploy)." Dan Van Winkle of The Mary Sue included She-Hulk in their "7 Female Superheroes Who Should Join Marvel’s Cinematic Universe" list, calling her one of the "women superheroes we would love to see make their way into the MCU." Chris Arrant of Newsarama ranked She-Hulk 8th in their "Best Marvel Characters of All Time" list, saying, "From the novel idea of a lawyer specializing in superhero law to a successful businesswoman dealing with the realities (and fiction) of controlling (or not controlling) her anger issues, She-Hulk isn't a cliché or an archetype, which makes her one of top characters in the Marvel U.

Jo-Anne Rowney of Daily Mirror ranked She-Hulk 8th in their "Best Female Superheroes of All Time" list. Aaron Young of Looper ranked She-Hulk 10th in their "Strongest Superheroes In History" list. Rob Bricken of Gizmodo ranked She-Hulk 16th in their "Every Member Of The Avengers" list. IGN ranked She-Hulk 18th in their "Top 50 Avengers" list, and 88th in their "100 Comic Book Heroes" list, asserting, "Plenty of heroes have gained female sidekicks over the years, but few of these ladies have so capably managed to escape the shadow of their namesakes as She-Hulk. Where Hulk is merely an outlet for Bruce Banner's rage and pain, She-Hulk is pure liberation for the geeky, mousy Jennifer Walters. This gamma gal has an impressive track record in comics, and we're waiting for her to join her cousin on the big screen." Darren French of Entertainment Weekly ranked She-Hulk 19th in their "Let's Rank Every Avenger Ever" list. Comics Buyer's Guide ranked She-Hulk 11th in their "100 Sexiest Women in Comics" list. Wizard ranked She-Hulk 104th in their "200 comic book characters" list.

Screen Rant included She-Hulk in their "10 Most Powerful Lawyers In Comics" list, and ranked her 3rd in their "10 Most Powerful Members Of The Lady Liberators" list, and 13th in their "20 Most Powerful Members Of The Avengers" list. Comic Book Resources ranked She-Hulk 1st in their "Marvel: The 10 Strongest Female Heroes" list, 2nd in their "10 Most Powerful Lawyers In Marvel Comics" list, 3rd in their "20 Strongest Female Superheroes" list, 5th in their "10 Most Powerful Members Of The Fantastic Four" list, 5th in their "A-Force: 10 Most Powerful Members Of The All-Female Avengers Team" list, 7th in their "20 Most Powerful Female Members Of The Avengers" list, 8th in their "10 Most Attractive Marvel Heroes" list, 9th in their "10 Scariest Avengers" list, 10th in their "10 Most Fashionable Marvel Heroes" list, and 19th in their "25 Most Powerful Avengers" list.

=== Impact ===
In January 2016, She-Hulk was ranked 18th in the "Top 100 Marvel Characters" list across a popularity contest held by Comic Book Resources.

== Literary reception ==
=== Volumes ===
==== She-Hulk (2014) ====
According to Diamond Comic Distributors, She-Hulk #1 was the 36th best selling comic book in February 2014.

Kelly Thompson of Comic Book Resources called She-Hulk #1 a "strong opening for a character well deserving of the spotlight," asserting, "Overall, "She-Hulk #1 is a great start to a new series for a character well deserving of the spotlight. If Soule can find a way to better balance the lawyer element of the book by sprinkling in a bit more action, he and Pulido are likely to have a hit on their hands." Benjamin Bailey of IGN gave She-Hulk #1 a grade of 9.8 out of 10, writing, "This is not a superhero book. Not even a little bit. It's more Hawkeye than Hulk, following the stories of Jennifer Walters's law career – or lack of career, as the book starts – and what she does when she's not an Avenger or member of the FF. In other words, this is a comic that could have gone really bad really fast. In the wrong hands, this thing could have been a boring, bizarre mess. Fortunately, due to the very capable Charles Soule and Javier Pulido, that is not the case. In fact, She-Hulk #1 is absolutely fantastic. It's the She-Hulk comic we never knew we needed."

==== She-Hulk (Marvel Legacy) (2017) ====
According to Diamond Comic Distributors, She-Hulk #159 was the 48th best selling comic book in November 2017.

Joshua Davison of Bleeding Cool stated, "She-Hulk #159 was a pleasantly surprising read. The story was gripping, if a bit slow. We don't get to see Jen fully She-Hulk out, but she is a likable enough character that I was fine just reading about her. Hellcat has a great presence in the comic too, and the read was overall compelling. I recommend it. Check it out." Joe Garza of SlashFilm included She-Hulk #159 in their "15 Best She-Hulk Comics You Need To Read" list, asserting, "The Leader has always been a great villain for the Hulk — and this storyline proves that he's just as great against She-Hulk — as he's typically forced into using his immense intellect to best a foe who relies on brute force. However, this story shines as an exploration of PTSD. During this time in the Marvel Comics universe, Bruce Banner was dead (only to return, of course), and the heroes had been rocked by a lasting status quo shakeup, She-Hulk included. This storyline saw her dealing with loss and identity in a way rarely seen before in "She-Hulk" comics, and it's handled with all of the grace (and punching) it deserves."

==== Immortal She-Hulk (2020) ====
According to Diamond Comic Distributors, Immortal She-Hulk #1 was the 17th best selling comic book in September 2020.

Oscar Maltby of Newsarama described Immortal She-Hulk #1 as an "emotionally weighty one-shot," stating, "Immortal She-Hulk #1 is a tie-in trapped between two worlds. Directly picking up in the fallout of Empyre but with roots much deeper than that summer event, Ewing and Davis-Hunt offer up an accomplished one-shot that is one third a retrospective, one third a philosophical piece on the nature of immortality, and one third a short but potent chapter in Ewing's Immortal Hulk saga." Sam Stone of Comic Book Resources said, "The Immortal She-Hulk #1 provides a welcome window into Jennifer Walters' psyche as she grapples her own mortality and place in the Marvel Universe. While positioning She-Hulk for a bigger role in the main Immortal Hulk series and its escalating battle against the story's true, sinister mastermind the issue provides a nice change of pace by leaning more into introspection and character study than entirely focusing on smashing – though there is smashing to be had! For She-Hulk fans that have been looking for a less savage iteration of the character, this special one-shot issue provides them the chance to see both sides of Jennifer Walters in full." Connor Casey of ComicBook.com gave Immortal She-Hulk #1 a grade of 4 out of 5, asserting, "Al Ewing brings the brilliance from his Immortal Hulk run to this Immortal She-Hulk one-shot, in which Jennifer Walters explores some of the biggest ideas that haunt comic characters from the margins. What does it mean to come back from the dead? Is immortality real or is it merely a longer life span. What happens when somebody who is immortal suddenly… isn't? Ewing doesn't answer every question here (how could he possibly?) but it's fascinating to see characters like She-Hulk, Wolverine and Thor discuss these concepts."

==== She-Hulk (2022) ====
According to Diamond Comic Distributors, She-Hulk #1 was the 9th best selling comic book in January 2022.

Sayantan Gayen of Comic Book Resources described She-Hulk #1 as "lighthearted story," saying, "She-Hulk #1 provides a rare insight into the busy civilian life of Jennifer Walters. Much of the positive tone of the issue exudes from its lead, but there is also a sense of anxiousness as Walters interacts with a new environment – a point well made by Rowell throughout the book. While the story does not have an antagonist yet, there is no sluggishness in the narrative's pace. The story's plot matches the speed of Jennifer's hectic schedule. Whatever serenity Jen finds in this story quickly ends when a long-forgotten Marvel character crashes through her door, ending She-Hulk #1 on a shocking and rewarding cliffhanger." Joe Garza of SlashFilm included She-Hulk #1 in their "15 Best She-Hulk Comics You Need To Read" list, stating, "This new solo series is the perfect jumping-on point for casual fans, as it establishes a whole new status quo for She-Hulk, setting the stage for adventures that aren't beholden to past continuity. However, there are still plenty of nods to She-Hulk's long history to keep legacy fans happy as well. It's a back-to-basics comic that strips the character down to what made her so special in her formative years."

== In other media ==
=== Television ===
- Jennifer Walters / She-Hulk appears in The Incredible Hulk (1982), voiced by Victoria Carroll.
- Jennifer Walters / She-Hulk was intended to appear in The Death of the Incredible Hulk, but did not make the final cut. A year later, a proposed She-Hulk series for the ABC network was considered "dead."
- Jennifer Walters / She-Hulk makes non-speaking cameo appearances in Fantastic Four (1994).
- Jennifer Walters / She-Hulk appears in The Incredible Hulk (1996), voiced by Lisa Zane in the first season and Cree Summer in the second. She initially appears as a guest character before becoming a main character, which led to the series being renamed The Incredible Hulk and She-Hulk. This version is shown to enjoy an active sport-filled life to show off her strength and agility and will revert to her human form if she pushes herself too far for extended periods of time, with an adrenaline rush allowing her to change back.
- Jennifer Walters / She-Hulk appears in the Fantastic Four: World's Greatest Heroes episode "The Cure", voiced by Rebecca Shoichet. After Ben Grimm is reverted to his human form, She-Hulk replaces him in the Fantastic Four until he changes back into the Thing.
- Jennifer Walters / She-Hulk appears in The Super Hero Squad Show episode "So Pretty When They Explode!", voiced by Katee Sackhoff.
- Jennifer Walters / She-Hulk appears in the Ultimate Spider-Man four-part episode "Contest of Champions," voiced by Eliza Dushku.
- Jennifer Walters / She-Hulk appears in Hulk and the Agents of S.M.A.S.H., voiced again by Eliza Dushku. This version is a stunt pilot and a member of the titular team.
- Jennifer Walters / She-Hulk appears in Marvel Super Hero Adventures episode "From Hulk to Eternity", voiced by Elysia Rotaru.
- Jennifer Walters / She-Hulk appears in Lego Marvel Avengers: Mission Demolition, voiced by Tiffani Thiessen.

=== Film ===
After two television projects for She-Hulk failed to materialize, a live-action motion picture was planned in the early 1990s, with Larry Cohen as writer and director. Ten months later, Brigitte Nielsen was announced to play the title role. She posed for photos dressed both as She-Hulk and her alter ego Jennifer Walters, but the film was never completed.

=== Marvel Cinematic Universe ===
Tatiana Maslany portrays Jennifer Walters in the live-action series She-Hulk: Attorney at Law (2022). This version is accidentally cross-contaminated with Bruce Banner's blood following a car accident. In November 2019, Marvel Studios president Kevin Feige said that there are plans to feature She-Hulk in future Marvel Cinematic Universe (MCU) films following her introduction in her television series.

=== Video games ===
- Jennifer Walters / She-Hulk appears as a playable character in Fantastic Four (1997).
- Evil doppelgangers of She-Hulk appear in Marvel Super Heroes in War of the Gems.
- Jennifer Walters / She-Hulk appears in Marvel: Ultimate Alliance 2, voiced by Alicia Coppola. She appears as a mini-boss in the Anti-Registration campaign and a playable character in the Nintendo DS version.
- Jennifer Walters / She-Hulk appears as a playable character in Marvel Super Hero Squad: The Infinity Gauntlet, voiced again by Cree Summer.
- Jennifer Walters / She-Hulk appears as a playable character in Marvel vs. Capcom 3: Fate of Two Worlds, voiced by Maria Canals-Barrera.
- Jennifer Walters / She-Hulk appears as a playable character in Ultimate Marvel vs. Capcom 3, voiced again by Maria Canals-Barrera.
- Jennifer Walters / She-Hulk appears as an unlockable playable character in Marvel Super Hero Squad Online, voiced by Grey DeLisle.
- Jennifer Walters / She-Hulk appears as an unlockable playable character in Marvel Avengers Alliance. This version is one of the Serpent's Worthy, Skirn.
- Jennifer Walters / She-Hulk appears as a non-playable and playable character in Marvel Heroes via the "Advance Pack 2" DLC, voiced by Mary Faber.
- Jennifer Walters / She-Hulk appears as an unlockable playable character in Lego Marvel Super Heroes, voiced by Tara Strong.
- Jennifer Walters / She-Hulk appears in Marvel Pinball as part of the "Infinity Gauntlet," "Civil War," and "Women of Power" tables.
- Jennifer Walters / She-Hulk appears as an unlockable playable character in Marvel Avengers Alliance Tactics.
- Jennifer Walters / She-Hulk appears as a playable character in Marvel: Avengers Alliance 2.
- Jennifer Walters / She-Hulk appears as an unlockable playable character in Lego Marvel's Avengers, voiced by Misty Lee.
- Jennifer Walters / She-Hulk appears as an unlockable playable character in Marvel Future Fight.
- Jennifer Walters / She-Hulk appears as an unlockable playable character in Marvel Contest of Champions.
- Jennifer Walters / She-Hulk appears as an unlockable playable character in Marvel Avengers Academy.
- Jennifer Walters / She-Hulk appears as an unlockable playable character in Lego Marvel Super Heroes 2, voiced by Melanie Bond.
- Jennifer Walters / She-Hulk appears as an unlockable playable character in Marvel Puzzle Quest.
- Jennifer Walters / She-Hulk appears as a purchasable outfit in Fortnite Battle Royale.
- Jennifer Walters / She-Hulk appears in Marvel Snap.
- Jennifer Walters / She-Hulk appears as a playable character in Marvel Cosmic Invasion, voiced again by Elysia Rotaru.
- She-Hulk appears as an NPC in Marvel Tokon: Fighting Souls.

=== Miscellaneous ===
- Jennifer Walters / She-Hulk appears in the motion comic Marvel Knights: Ultimate Wolverine vs. Hulk, voiced by Nicole Oliver.
- Jennifer Walters / She-Hulk has been adapted into many forms of merchandise, including Marvel Legends, Funko Pop!, a Lego minifigure, and Sideshow Collectibles.

== Collected editions ==
=== The Savage She-Hulk ===
Title	Material collected	Publication date	ISBN
Essential Savage She-Hulk	The Savage She-Hulk #1–25	July 2006	978-0785123354
Marvel Masterworks: The Savage She-Hulk Vol. 1	The Savage She-Hulk #1–14	August 2017	978-1302903541
Marvel Masterworks: The Savage She-Hulk Vol. 2	The Savage She-Hulk #15–25, Marvel Two-in-One #88	May 2019	978-1302917180
The Savage She-Hulk Omnibus	The Savage She-Hulk #1–25, Marvel Two-in-One #88	April 2022	978-1302934224

=== The Sensational She-Hulk ===
Title	Material collected	Published date	ISBN
The Sensational She-Hulk	The Sensational She-Hulk #1–8	September 1992	978-0871358929
The Sensational She-Hulk by John Byrne Volume 1	The Sensational She-Hulk #1–8, Marvel Comics Presents #18	April 2011	978-0785153061
Howard the Duck: The Complete Collection Vol. 4	The Sensational She-Hulk #14–17 and Howard the Duck magazine #8–9, Marvel Team-Up #96, Howard the Duck (vol. 1) #32–33, material from Bizarre Adventures #34, Marvel Tales #237, Spider-Man Team-Up #5	October 2017	978-1302908607
Death's Head: Freelance Peacekeeping Agent	The Sensational She-Hulk #24 and Dragon's Claws #5, Death's Head #1–7, 9–10, Death's Head: The Body In Question, Fantastic Four #338, Marvel Comics Presents #76, What If? (vol. 2) #54, Marvel Heroes #33	March 2020	978-1302923365
The Sensational She-Hulk by John Byrne: The Return	The Sensational She-Hulk #31–46, 48–50	December 2016	978-1302901691
Sensational She-Hulk by John Byrne Omnibus	Marvel Graphic Novel No. 18 – The Sensational She-Hulk, The Sensational She-Hulk #1–8, 31–46, 48–50, material from Marvel Comics Presents #18	November 2020	978-1302923686
She-Hulk Epic Collection 3: Breaking The Fourth Wall	The Sensational She-Hulk #1–12, She-Hulk: Ceremony #1–2, material from Solo Avengers #14, Marvel Comics Presents #18, Marvel Fanfare #48	May 2022	978-1302945916
She-Hulk Epic Collection 4: The Cosmic Squish Principle	Sensational She-Hulk #13–30 and material from Marvel Super-Heroes #5	May 23, 2023	978-1302951634
She-Hulk Epic Collection 5: Interrupted Melody	Sensational She-Hulk #31-50	December 22, 2026	978-1302969516
She-Hulk Epic Collection 6: To Die and Live in L.A.	Sensational She-Hulk #51–60, Doc Samson (vol. 1) #1-4, The Incredible Hulk (vol.1) #441-442, Thing & She-Hulk: The Long Night, and material from Marvel Comics Presents (vol. 1) #123-126 and The Incredible Hulk (vol.1) #412.	July 23, 2024	978-1302956691

=== She-Hulk ===
Title	Material collected	Published date	ISBN
She-Hulk Volume 1: Single Green Female	She-Hulk (vol. 1) #1–6	November 2004	978-0785114437
She-Hulk Volume 2: Superhuman Law	She-Hulk (vol. 1) #7–12	May 2005	978-0785115700
She-Hulk Volume 3: Time Trials	She-Hulk (vol. 2) #1–5	July 2006	978-0785117957
She-Hulk Volume 4: Laws of Attraction	She-Hulk (vol. 2) #6–13	March 2007	978-0785122180
She-Hulk Volume 5: Planet Without a Hulk	She-Hulk (vol. 2) #14–21	November 2007	978-0785123996
She-Hulk Volume 6: Jaded	She-Hulk (vol. 2) #22–27	May 2008	978-0785132226
She-Hulk Volume 7: Here Today...	She-Hulk (vol. 2) #28–30, She-Hulk: Cosmic Collision	March 2009	978-0785129660
She-Hulk Volume 8: Secret Invasion	She-Hulk (vol. 2) #31–33, X-Factor (vol. 3) #34–35	April 2009	978-0785131809
She-Hulk Volume 9: Lady Liberators	She-Hulk (vol. 2) #34–38	July 2009	978-0785141143
She-Hulk by Dan Slott: The Complete Collection Volume 1	She-Hulk (vol. 1) #1–12, She-Hulk (vol. 2) #1–5	February 2014	978-0785154402
She-Hulk by Dan Slott: The Complete Collection Volume 2	She-Hulk (vol. 2) #6–21, Marvel Westerns: Two-Gun Kid	May 2014	978-0785154709
She-Hulk by Dan Slott Omnibus	She-Hulk (vol. 1) #1–12, She-Hulk (vol. 2) #1–21, Marvel Westerns: Two-Gun Kid	August 2020	978-1302947231
She-Hulk by Peter David Omnibus	She-Hulk (vol. 2) #22–38, She-Hulk: Cosmic Collision, X-Factor (vol. 3) #33–34, Sensational She-Hulk #12, material from She-Hulk Sensational #1	May 2022	978-1302934835
She-Hulk Vol. 1: Law and Disorder	She-Hulk (vol. 3) #1–6	October 2014	978-0785190196
She-Hulk Vol. 2: Disorderly Conduct	She-Hulk (vol. 3) #7–12	April 2015	978-0785190202
She-Hulk by Soule & Pulido: The Complete Collection	She-Hulk (vol. 3) #1–12, Wolverines #13, material from Gwenpool Special #1	December 2018	978-1302947750
She-Hulk Vol. 1: Deconstructed	Hulk (vol. 4) #1–6	July 2017	978-1302905675
She-Hulk Vol. 2: Let Them Eat Cake	Hulk (vol. 4) #7–11	January 2018	978-1302905682
She-Hulk Vol. 3: Jen Walters Must Die	She-Hulk (vol. 1) #159–163	May 2018	978-1302905699
She-Hulk by Mariko Tamaki	Hulk (vol. 4) #1–11, She-Hulk (vol. 1) #159–163	September 2023	978-1302950774
She-Hulk By Rainbow Rowell Vol. 1: Jen, Again	She-Hulk (vol. 4) #1–5	October 2022	978-1302929077
She-Hulk By Rainbow Rowell Vol. 2: Jen of Hearts	She-Hulk (vol. 4) #6-10	May 2023	978-1302947965
She-Hulk By Rainbow Rowell Vol. 3: Girl Can't Help It	She-Hulk (vol. 4) #11-15	October 2023	978-1302952402
She-Hulk By Rainbow Rowell Vol. 4: Jen-Sational	Sensational She-Hulk (vol. 2) #1-5	July 2024	978-1302957117
She-Hulk By Rainbow Rowell Vol. 5: All In	Sensational She-Hulk (vol. 2) #6-10	September 2024	978-1302957124
She-Hulk By Rainbow Rowell Omnibus	She-Hulk (vol. 4) 1-15, Sensational She-Hulk (vol. 2) 1-10, and material from Marvel Comics #1000	October 2025	978-1302966409

=== She-Hulks ===
Title	Material collected	Published date	ISBN
Fall of the Hulks: The Savage She-Hulks	Fall of the Hulks: The Savage She-Hulks #1–3, Incredible Hulk #600–605	August 2010	978-0785147961
She-Hulks: Hunt for the Intelligencia	She-Hulks #1–4, material from She-Hulk Sensational #1	July 2011	978-0785150008

=== One-Shots ===
Title	Material collected	Published date	ISBN
Acts of Evil	She-Hulk Annual #1 and Punisher Annual (vol. 5) #1, Venom Annual (vol. 2) #1, Ms. Marvel Annual (vol. 2) #1, Deadpool Annual (vol. 5) #1, Ghost Spider Annual #1, Moon Knight Annual (vol. 2) #1, Wolverine Annual (vol. 5) #1	January 2020	978-1302921545
Immortal Hulk Vol. 11: Apocrypha	Immortal She-Hulk #1 and Immortal Hulk: The Best Defense #1, Defenders: The Best Defense #1, Absolute Carnage: Immortal Hulk #1, Immortal Hulk #0, King in Black: Immortal Hulk #1	January 2022	978-1302931162
