= Batsh*t Valley =

2019 mockumentary

Batsh*t Valley is a 2019 two-part episode of the acclaimed Emmy Award-nominated mockumentary series Documentary Now!.

== Inspirations ==
It parodies the hit Netflix docuseries Wild Wild Country and the 2012 documentary film The Source Family.

== Summary ==
In 1980, cult leader Father Ra-Shawbard (Owen Wilson), under the surveillance of FBI agent Bill Dawes (Michael Keaton), and his followers (alongside his militant second-in-command Ra-Sharir (Necar Zadegan)) has taken over the small town of Chinook, Oregon (soon to be renamed Ra-Shawbard's Butthole).

== See also ==
- Pittsburgh Steelers - the robes that Ra-Shawbard's followers wore were based on the color schemes of the Super Bowl-winning team
- Holy Hell - 2016 documentary about the Buddhafield cult
