= Lillian Benson =

American film editor

Lillian E. Benson
- Born: New York
- Occupation: film editor

Lillian Benson is a film and television editor who currently serves on the board of American Cinema Editors. She is also the first African-American woman to become a member of the honorary society.

== Awards and recognition ==
- 1990: Emmy nomination, Eyes on the Prize (PBS)
- Currently: Secretary, ACE Board of Directors

•Recipient of the Motion Picture Editors Guild 2017 Fellowship and Service Award
