= Original Cast Album: Company =

- Directed by: D. A. Pennebaker
- Produced by: Daniel Melnick
- Starring: Elaine Stritch; Dean Jones; Stephen Sondheim; Thomas Z. Shepard
- Music by: Stephen Sondheim
- Release date: 1970
- Country: United States
- Language: English

Original Cast Album: Company is a 1970 documentary film produced by Daniel Melnick, then the executive VP of New York's Talent Associates, and directed by D. A. Pennebaker, observing the marathon recording session to create the original cast album for the Stephen Sondheim musical Company.

== Background ==
Talent Associates initially intended the project as a pilot for a television series dedicated to the making-of different cast recordings. Pennebaker's film crew joined the musical's cast at the Columbia Records 30th Street recording studio on 3 May 1970, shortly after Company had opened on Broadway (26 April).

== Sponsorship ==
Eastern Airlines signed on as financial sponsor many months before the filming, and before Company had been chosen. The new musicals Coco and Applause had been considered, but they were “passed over on the assumption that the leading ladies [Katharine Hepburn and Lauren Bacall] would not be prepared to be photographed without Hollywood make-up.” Eastern Airlines viewed the second-night Company performance on 27 April and then withdrew its financial underwriting, five days before filming. Eastern had reservations about the actions of the stewardess character April—“not so much that she slept with him [Bobby], but that she missed her flight.” Less than 48 hours before the recording session and scheduled filming, Chrysler Corporation agreed to sponsorship.

== Production ==
A total of twenty hours of film was shot, most of it on 3–4 May 1970. Four film cameras were employed. The session began at 10 a.m. on Sunday, with Elaine Stritch’s call at noon. Her first song was scheduled for 3:45, and she participated in ensemble numbers as well, not beginning her "Ladies Who Lunch" solo until well after midnight. The cameras captured the weary performers and production team, along with her unsuccessful “takes” of the number. It was producer Thomas Z. Shepard who suggested the orchestra record the song’s accompaniment without her so she could return another day, well-rested, to add her singing. Shepard reported: “I had to give her a chance. I knew she was exhausted. No matter what she did interpretively, her voice was shot. What can I say to her, ‘So long, pussycat, forget about it?’ She could have fooled me. She wanted so much to be able to do it. She’s such a pro. I couldn’t rob her of the dignity of the chance. After three takes, I knew it wasn’t going to happen. I hated telling her. There she is in front of the orchestra. It’s ignominious….When the film was shown at Lincoln Center [five months later] I was hissed.” Stritch recalled the incident later: “I’ve been accused by producers and directors of being a pain in the rear. This documentary will prove that I’m actually trying to get the damned thing right….[giving up on the recording session] was like being sent home from school. But I’m mature enough to agree: You win. I just gave out. I walk out like Mickey Rooney leaving Boys Town forever. Then I found out that…three cameramen were going to follow me into the dressing room until Fritz Holt, the stage manager, stopped them. There I was, crying and everything, so tired. And besides, the bars were closed.”

== Screenings and Telecasts ==
As Company continued its successful run on Broadway, the film was screened twice at the New York Film Festival, on 10 and 16 September 1970; it was unanimously praised by a crowd that filled the auditorium to capacity. During the week of 25–31 October it was aired by WNEW TV (New York, WBZ-TV (Boston), KYW-TV (Philadelphia), WTTV (Los Angeles), KPIX-TV (San Francisco), KDKA-TV (Pittsburgh), WJZ-TV (Baltimore), WBFM-TV (Indianapolis), WPLG-TV (Miami and Palm Beach) and KOB-TV (Albuquerque) Soon after the October 1970 telecasts, this film’s producers had been hired by Hollywood for a production at MGM, and no further cast recording sessions were filmed for the projected series.

== Synopsis ==
Filled with behind-the-scenes footage of the painstaking studio recording process, the film captures both the musical direction and insight of composer Sondheim. Several Company songs appear in the film, including "Another Hundred People", "Getting Married Today", and "Being Alive"—all recorded with a live orchestra, done in multiple takes, over the course of a lengthy studio session.

Eventually, several hours past midnight, only "The Ladies Who Lunch" remains to be recorded. Elaine Stritch, Sondheim, and the orchestra are all clearly suffering the effects of the prolonged recording session. Stritch struggles repeatedly to record a satisfactory version of the song, even going so far as to slightly drop the key for a few takes. Her voice continues to degrade as her energy ebbs away. There is increasing tension between the struggling Stritch, producer Thomas Z. Shepard, and Sondheim.

Shortly before dawn, the decision is made to wrap. A final orchestral take is recorded, with a plan to have Stritch return to the studio to record her vocal separately. The film cuts to a revitalized Stritch, in full hair and makeup (in preparation for a Wednesday matinee performance of the show), triumphantly singing "The Ladies Who Lunch".

== Cast and songs ==
- Dean Jones – Robert: "Being Alive", "Barcelona"
- Elaine Stritch – Joanne: "Little Things You Do Together", "Ladies Who Lunch"
- Barbara Barrie – Sarah
- George Coe – David
- John Cunningham – Peter
- Teri Ralston – Jenny
- Charles Kimbrough – Harry
- Donna McKechnie – Kathy: "You Could Drive a Person Crazy"
- Charles Braswell – Larry
- Susan Browning – April: "You Could Drive a Person Crazy", "Barcelona"
- Steve Elmore – Paul
- Beth Howland – Amy: "Getting Married Today"
- Pamela Myers – Marta: "You Could Drive a Person Crazy", "Another Hundred People"
- Merle Louise – Susan

with

- Stephen Sondheim – songwriter
- Thomas Z. Shepard – record producer
- Harold Hastings – musical director
- George Furth – playwright
- Harold Prince – director

== Influence and legacy ==
The film earned a brief rave in The New York Times when slated for a theatrical screening at the IFC Center in October 2014.

The film serves as the basis for the parody Original Cast Album: Co-Op, an episode from the Emmy Award-nominated mockumentary series Documentary Now depicting the cast album recording session for a 1970s musical about a New York City apartment cooperative. The New York Times television critic Mike Hale interviewed Pennebaker and Sondheim about the comedy spoof when it first aired in February 2019. A conversation about the parody episode, recorded in 2020, was included in the Criterion release the following year.

== Home media ==
First released on Laserdisc and videocassette by RCA Victor in 1992, the film was later released on DVD in 2001.

The Criterion Channel began streaming the documentary, to wide acclaim, on June 15, 2020, along with a 2001 commentary recorded by Pennebaker, Harold Prince, and Elaine Stritch, offering their insights on both the original Broadway production, as well as the documentary itself. Prince shares his account of Dean Jones' experience and the challenges of playing the lead. Prince observes that no one was better in the very difficult part than Jones.

The Criterion Collection released a special DVD and Blu-ray edition of the documentary on August 17, 2021. A restored 4K transfer of the film, the release features newly-produced and archival special features including a new commentary with Sondheim, along with the parody Original Cast Album: Co-Op.
