= The Ladies Who Lunch (song) =

1970 Broadway musical song by Stephen Sondheim

"The Ladies Who Lunch" is a song from the Broadway musical Company, sung by the character Joanne. It was written by Stephen Sondheim, and was introduced by Elaine Stritch. It became her signature song.

== Production ==
In regard to her performance, which one interviewer described as filled with "rage", Elaine Stritch responded "I don’t think I sang it with rage. First of all, she drank. I should have made you understand that. Anyway, when you drink, you can do anything you want, and it’s not always very attractive. I tried to say to the audience, 'And here’s to the ones who just watch—and they’re not here anymore'".

"Stritch’s epic struggle with her big number" serves as the climax to the 1970 documentary Original Cast Album: Company by D.A. Pennebaker. "Stritch, Stephen Sondheim, and the orchestra were all exhausted because it was after midnight and the end of a long day of recording". After struggling several times to perform the vocals, the recording session was suspended. Stritch returned two days later, after a matinee performance of Company, and successfully recorded the final take for the album.

== Synopsis ==
Bustle magazine gives this synopsis: "'The Ladies Who Lunch' is a song that mockingly judges the rich and wealthy women who waste their middle-aged lives doing nothing meaningful, sung by Joanne (Stritch) while out at a nightclub with her third husband Larry and their friend Robert".

== Critical reception ==
Bustle wrote of Stritch: "The performance is so famous, in fact, that it has been parodied many times in pop culture". The Wire called it Stritch's "signature song", while The New York Times' obituary named it "her theme, until her 70s, when Sondheim's 'I'm Still Here' from Follies took over".

The Guardian described Stritch's performance of the song in the 1972 London production:

Then Stritch's Joanne gets her solo, "The Ladies Who Lunch", and it's terrifying. She hits the sustained blasts on the words "Everybody rise [...] rise", the awe-filled summons to toast those ladies, and it's impressive, but it's the calm way Stritch delivers the rest of Sondheim's summary of post-marital female decline, of the long littleness of life, that's a revelation. So far, I've been under the happy illusion that dames are cool because they're rising above their knowledge of the truths that everyone else in the plot keeps ignoring. But I can hear in Stritch's delivery, in the hard burn of her notes, that – no matter how many vodka stingers she downs – her character can't escape failure, boredom and loss. So, I thought, you aren't born a dame; it takes bad experience, not just borne but wrought into humour, to become one. It's an earned honour. There should be a medal.

The site compared it to a performance she gave in 2002, writing in this performance "the song is an anthem of forgiveness. Whatever those ladies had been doing was just human, and she's tolerating it, wryly, dryly. The dame has forgiven everybody: she has forgiven herself".

== Covers ==
The song has been performed by other actresses portraying Joanne in Company, including Debra Monk (1995 Broadway revival), Sheila Gish (1996 London revival), Lynn Redgrave (2002 Kennedy Center), Barbara Walsh (2006 Broadway revival), Haydn Gwynne (2010 London revival, 2022 concert), and Patti LuPone (2011 concert, 2018 London revival, 2021 Broadway revival).

Carol Burnett, Vicki Lawrence, and guest Valerie Harper performed the song on Burnett's eponymous TV series in 1973; Burnett reprised the song to critical acclaim in the 1999 Broadway production of Putting It Together.

Barbra Streisand recorded the song in 1985 for her bestselling The Broadway Album, blended in a medley with Sondheim's "Pretty Women" from Sweeney Todd (1979).

Anna Kendrick covered the song in the 2003 film Camp.

Alan Cumming has performed the song numerous times, including a 2013 reading.

Jinkx Monsoon performed the parody "Ladies in Drag" for her 2014 The Inevitable Album.

The trio of Meryl Streep, Audra McDonald, and Christine Baranski performed the song, via Zoom during the pandemic quarantine, to commemorate Sondheim's 90th birthday.

Camila Mendes performed the song in TV series Riverdale episode "Biblical" (Season 6 Episode 18).

Scott Thompson performed a portion of the song on the Dharma & Greg episode "Kitty Dearest" (Season 4, Episode 19).

Jennifer Simard performed the song as a understudy in the 2021 Broadway Revival of Company with only 45 minutes of notice after Patti LuPone (who played Joanne) tested positive for COVID-19. She covered both the matinee and evening performances on Saturday, 26 February 2022.
