= Whose Show Is This? =

- She-Hulk: Attorney at Law episode
- The episode features a fourth wall-breaking conversation with "K.E.V.I.N.", an artificial intelligence claiming to be in charge of all Marvel Cinematic Universe (MCU) storyline decisions. K.E.V.I.N. was inspired by real-life Marvel Studios president Kevin Feige.
- Episode no.: Episode 9
- Directed by: Kat Coiro
- Written by: Jessica Gao
- Cinematography by: Florian Ballhaus
- Editing by: Jamie Gross; Stacey Schroeder; Zene Baker
- Original release date: October 13, 2022
- Running time: 35 minutes

Cast
- Nick Gomez as Wrecker; Candice Rose as Aunt Melanie; Michael H. Cole as Uncle Tucker; Nicholas Cirillo as Cousin Ched; Elizabeth Becka as Aunt Rebecca; Wil Deusner as Skaar; Eden Lee as "Writer Jessica"; Justin Miles as "Writer Zeb"

Episode chronology
← Previous "Ribbit and Rip It"	Next → —

"Whose Show Is This?" is the ninth episode and series finale of the American television series She-Hulk: Attorney at Law, based on Marvel Comics featuring the character She-Hulk. It follows Jennifer Walters as she deals with the consequences of the previous episode while attempting to obtain information about Intelligencia. The episode is set in the Marvel Cinematic Universe (MCU), sharing continuity with the films of the franchise. It was written by head writer Jessica Gao and directed by Kat Coiro.

Tatiana Maslany stars as Walters, alongside Josh Segarra, Jameela Jamil, Ginger Gonzaga, Jon Bass, Mark Linn-Baker, Tess Malis Kincaid, Mark Ruffalo, Benedict Wong, Charlie Cox, Renée Elise Goldsberry, Tim Roth, and Drew Matthews. Coiro joined the series by September 2020 to direct the majority of the series' episodes.

"Whose Show Is This?" was released on Disney+ on October 13, 2022.

== Plot ==
Jennifer Walters is released from Department of Damage Control custody, but is forced to wear an inhibitor to prevent her from transforming into She-Hulk, and loses her job at Goodman, Lieber, Kurtzberg & Holliway. She decides to go to Emil Blonsky / Abomination's retreat to seek advice, after failing to gather information on Intelligencia and its creator the "HulkKing".

Walters' best friend Nikki Ramos successfully manages to receive an invite from the "HulkKing" to join a private gathering, and asks Pug to infiltrate the event. Pug attends the gathering, which also takes place at Blonsky's retreat, and learns that Todd Phelps is the "HulkKing". Walters arrives at the retreat and stumbles upon the gathering. Blonsky is present in his Abomination form, acting as a motivational speaker, although he has no knowledge of Intelligencia's true goals. Walters confronts Phelps, who injects himself with a substance containing her blood, turning himself into a Hulk. A fight ensues as Titania and Walters' cousin Bruce Banner also join with Titania fighting the Intelligencia members and Banner fighting Blonsky.

Confused by what is happening, Walters destroys her inhibitor, transforms, breaks the fourth wall, and enters the documentary series Marvel Studios: Assembled through the Disney+ platform. There, she goes to Marvel Studios' production room of the show and confronts its writers who direct her to "Kevin". She then meets K.E.V.I.N., an artificial intelligence claiming to be in charge of all Marvel Cinematic Universe (MCU) storyline decisions. Walters brings her complaints to K.E.V.I.N. while bringing up the father issues of several MCU characters, as well as asking when the X-Men are going to appear and ideas she has if her show gets a second season. Walters persuades K.E.V.I.N. to rewrite the climax of the episode and K.E.V.I.N. reluctantly agrees. Walters returns to the show as Phelps and the rest of Intelligencia are arrested and vows to see Phelps in court. As Titania is being interviewed, Blonsky agrees to return to prison for ten years after violating his parole.

Walters returns home to celebrate with her family and Matt Murdock, who is suddenly brought back to the series after Walters asked K.E.V.I.N. for him. Banner joins them, returning from Sakaar, as he introduces his son Skaar. Sometime later while having regained her job, Walters goes to her court case against Phelps and Intelligencia. When asked by a reporter if she will be working as a lawyer or a superhero, She-Hulk answers "both" before entering the courthouse.

In a mid-credits scene, Wong breaks Blonsky out of prison and takes him to Kamar-Taj.

== Production ==
=== Development ===
In August 2019, Marvel Studios announced that She-Hulk: Attorney at Law was being developed for the streaming service Disney+. That November, Jessica Gao was hired to serve as the head writer. In September 2020, Kat Coiro was hired to direct six episodes, including the ninth, and to executive produce the series. Executive producers include Marvel Studios' Kevin Feige, Louis D'Esposito, Victoria Alonso, Brad Winderbaum and Wendy Jacobson, in addition to Coiro and Gao. The ninth episode, titled "Whose Show Is This?", was written by Gao, and was released on Disney+ on October 13, 2022. The episode's title card is altered to say The Savage She-Hulk.

=== Writing ===
Gao initially conceived many different versions of the episode's ending "that went all over the place", before feeling she would need to have it be a "classic Marvel ending" with a "big villain fight", though this did not seem appropriate for the story the series had been telling. Feige reassured Gao that She-Hulk: Attorney at Law did not need to have that type of ending since the series was very different from the studio's other projects. It was then determined that Jennifer Walters would break the fourth wall and enter the real world to confront those who had been writing her story; this "extreme" four-wall break was heavily inspired by John Byrne's She-Hulk run in the comics. Walters eventually makes her way to the writers room of the series, a suggestion from Feige, before entering Marvel Studios to find the artificial intelligence K.E.V.I.N., the Knowledge Enhanced Visual Interconnectivity Nexus. Gao drew "so much from real life" and the real reverence members of Marvel Studios have for Feige for what the fake writers were saying about K.E.V.I.N. She had also pitched another version of Feige that "went too far" beyond an AI robot, with him being a "little puppy on a pillow" sitting on a throne.

[I]t really is Jen speaking her direct truth about herself. It's the moment when she is articulating that things aren't good enough, that this isn't what she wants or deserves, and to name that, you have to know yourself really well. So it took a while to find it, but [Jessica Gao] always had that idea and it was always going to destroy things and at the same time build things again.

— Tatiana Maslany on Jennifer Walters' discussion with K.E.V.I.N. regarding his initial ideas for the finale.

While talking with K.E.V.I.N., Walters references the father issues of several MCU characters, the lack of romance and sexual desire for women, and when the X-Men characters were going to appear. Gao referenced much of her real-life dynamic with Feige for the conversation between K.E.V.I.N. and Walters. Coiro called the leadership of Marvel Studios "incredibly self-deprecating and incredibly willing to poke fun at themselves" with regards to featuring K.E.V.I.N. and what was discussed between it and Walters in the episode. Maslany enjoyed how Walters and K.E.V.I.N. felt like equals and that the ideas she told him about her ideal finale "deserve[d] respect".

The end of the episode sees Bruce Banner / Smart Hulk return to Earth with his Sakaaran son Skaar. Coiro previously indicated that Banner heading back to Sakaar, as seen in the series' second episode, was tied to future MCU projects, which commentators speculated would be a World War Hulk adaptation. Mark Ruffalo was open to the idea of a World War Hulk adaptation, and exploring the time from when he left Earth and ended up on Sakaar. Coiro wanted Skaar to appear as a toddler, making him a "Baby Yoda kind of character", but this did not fit with Marvel Studios' future plans for the character. The writers always planned to feature a "big cameo" in the episode, but did not include or commit to one while writing the script because they knew whatever would have been chosen was possible not to be guaranteed by the time the episode would be filming because of a number of factors. When it came time to pick the character, Feige was the one to suggest debuting Skaar.

The mid-credits scene of Wong taking Emil Blonsky from his cell was created to "give Blonsky a happier ending" since "it didn't feel right" for him to "languish in prison". Gao explained that the character growth he went through in the series, such as friendship with Walters and helping her deal with her dual identities, was real, "regardless of how much good or bad he did on the show", and the writers did not want to see him returned to prison indefinitely. It was originally planned for the episode's mid-credits to answer the question if Steve Rogers was a virgin, which was originally meant to be a "season-long runner" that was "constantly gnawing away" at Walters; the answer was included in the series' first-episode mid-credits scene. Coiro had hoped to have included Madisynn King in the episode, but given the fourth episode where she appears was filmed after this episode, actress Patty Guggenheim had yet to be cast.

=== Casting ===
The episode stars Tatiana Maslany as Jennifer Walters / She-Hulk, Josh Segarra as Augustus "Pug" Pugliese, Jameela Jamil as Titania, Ginger Gonzaga as Nikki Ramos, Jon Bass as Todd Phelps / HulkKing / Hulk Todd, Mark Linn-Baker as Morris Walters, Tess Malis Kincaid as Elaine Walters, Mark Ruffalo as Bruce Banner / Hulk, Benedict Wong as Wong, Charlie Cox as Matt Murdock / Daredevil, Renée Elise Goldsberry as Mallory Book, Tim Roth as Emil Blonsky / Abomination, and Drew Matthews as Dennis Bukowski.

Also starring are Nick Gomez as Wrecker, Candice Rose as Aunt Melanie, Michael H. Cole as Uncle Tucker, Nicholas Cirillo as Cousin Ched, Elizabeth Becka as Aunt Rebecca, and Wil Deusner providing motion-capture as Skaar. Despite Deusner's casting, Gao stated she was unsure on whether Deusner would reprise the role in future projects or if the role would be recast, noting that decision would be up to Feige. News anchors John Gregory, Rachel Brown, and Jovana Lara appear as themselves. One of Maslany's She-Hulk stand-ins, Devon Lewis, appeared as the Savage She-Hulk in the opening sequence. Within the series' writing room, Eden Lee plays "Writer Jessica" while Justin Miles plays "Writer Zeb", with Gao and fellow series' writers Zeb Wells and Cody Zigler having cameo appearances. Marvel Studios' props master Russell Bobbitt cameos as an interviewee on the Disney lot, and Marvel Studios' then-receptionist Matt Wilkie appears as himself at their offices. Wilkie had to audition for the role.

The creatives initially wanted to stunt cast K.E.V.I.N. with "a very handsome [James Bond-type] debonair man in a tuxedo" such as George Clooney or Jon Hamm. They also tried to have Feige voice K.E.V.I.N., but he declined. Instead, Brian T. Delaney provided the uncredited voice of K.E.V.I.N. It was also considered to have Edward Norton appear in the episode instead of Ruffalo when the Hulk went up against the Abomination, since Norton portrayed Banner / Hulk in The Incredible Hulk (2008) when the characters first met.

=== Design ===
K.E.V.I.N. was initially designed to be wearing a black baseball cap, emulating the signature look of Feige. Feige felt this part of the design did not make sense, while also wanted some separation between himself and the robot. Marvel Studios' visual development member Jackson Sze suggested the hat concept could instead be incorporated into K.E.V.I.N.'s design, resulting in a traffic light-style "bill" above the robot's eye lenses. Gao described K.E.V.I.N. as an "Akira-like HAL 9000 type machine", while commentators likened K.E.V.I.N. to GLaDOS, the artificial intelligence from the video game series Portal.

=== Filming and visual effects ===
Filming occurred at Trilith Studios in Atlanta, Georgia, with Coiro directing the episode, and Florian Ballhaus serving as cinematographer. Filming also occurred on the Disney lot and Marvel Studios' offices in Burbank, California. "Whose Show Is This?" was the first episode filmed. Because of this, the actors were feeling confused as to what was happening with the story and their characters during the filming of the Intelligencia event, with Coiro believing this aided the episode because the whole point of the finale at that point was that it did not make sense.

The episode's opening features an almost identical recreation of the opening to the 1970s The Incredible Hulk television series with its shots and narration. This was shot by second-unit director Monique Ganderton, done in a way to make it look analog, with the series licensing several background plates that had been used on The Incredible Hulk. FuseFX, who worked on the sequence, edited out Bill Bixby's Banner and Lou Ferrigno's Hulk from original film scans of that series before superimposing Maslany onto the sequence, while also creating some elements featured in the original footage in 3D to more easily match what was filmed with Maslany. Maslany enjoyed filming the opening, since her and Ruffalo could "lean into that style", and believing it was a good fit for the meta aspects She-Hulk was doing. Coiro described the opening as Walters' "fever dream" that manifested as "a credit sequence from another TV show" because she is a self-aware character. /Film's Jenna Busch felt using this opening was "a brilliant move" and fit with Walters' situation at the beginning of the episode. Bass provided motion capture in the episode when Phelps becomes a Hulk.

Filming the scenes where Walters breaks through Disney+ to the Disney lot was shot at different times throughout the series' shooting schedule, and were Maslany's favorite to shoot, calling them "super fun and meta". The aspect ratio and shooting style were changed for this part of the episode to make it "as realistic as possible". She-Hulk fighting the security guards at the Marvel Studios offices mimics a similar fight in Iron Man 2 (2010) with Natasha Romanoff fighting guards. An alternate version of the episode's ending was filmed, that was "very different, a little more serious and less like Jen's version of it", with more She-Hulk and "a different strategy to it", according to Maslany. In the one that was used, the X-Men line was an alternate take suggested during filming, with Maslany improvising sitting down. This moment made it seem like Walters and K.E.V.I.N. had become fast friends, with Maslany stating, "Something about that feels very Jen, and feels very funny." As well, Walters expression of giving a thumbs up and sticking her tongue out after asking the question about the X-Men was inspired by the She-Hulk design featured on hats for the crew, which was drawn by Gao's fiancé Truck Torrence.

Visual effects for the series were created by Digital Domain, Wētā FX, Wylie Co., Trixter, Cantina Creative, FuseFX, SDFX Studios, Capital T, Keep Me Posted, Soho VFX, Ingenuity Studios, and Lightstage.

=== Music ===
The following songs are featured in the episode: The Incredible Hulk theme by Joe Harnell, "Gonna Be a Winner" by Jason Glover and Richard Neale, "Pepe Le Stink" by Michael Brooks Linney, Jon Hartman, Mark Thomas Williams, and Jeffery S. Lippencott, "Big Energy" by Latto, various themes from Black Panther (2018) by Ludwig Göransson, "We Run This" by The Sugarhill Gang, and "I Want to See the Bright Lights Tonight" by Richard and Linda Thompson.

== Marketing ==
A QR code was included in the episode that allowed viewers to access a free digital copy of Sensational She-Hulk #50, in which Walters helps the editorial team choose a new creative team for her comic. After the episode's release, Marvel announced merchandise inspired by the episode as part of its weekly "Marvel Must Haves" promotion for each episode of the series, including She-Hulk Funko Pops, apparel, and accessories, and Titania and Abomination apparel.

== Reception ==
=== Viewership ===
According to market research company Parrot Analytics, which looks at consumer engagement in consumer research, streaming, downloads, and on social media, She-Hulk: Attorney at Law experienced a slight decline in demand in the week of October 15–21, 2022, with a level of 36.3 times the average series demand. This represented a 4.5% drop following its finale on October 13. Despite this drop, the series remained the third most in-demand among breakout shows, which are defined as the most in-demand series that have premiered in the past 100 days. Nielsen Media Research, which records streaming viewership on U.S. television screens, reported that it was the fifth-most watched original series across streaming services for the week of October 10–16, 2022, with 526 million minutes watched, a 14.7% increase from the previous week. Whip Media, which tracks viewership data for the more than 21 million worldwide users of its TV Time app, calculated that She-Hulk: Attorney at Law was the most-streamed original series in the U.S. for the week ending October 16, 2022. It subsequently moved to the fourth position for the week ending October 23, 2022.

=== Critical response ===
The review aggregator website Rotten Tomatoes reports a 73% approval rating with an average rating of 7.20/10, based on 30 reviews. The site's critical consensus reads, "She-Hulk goes fully meta for a kooky finale that frustratingly leaves some loose ends but is nonetheless packed with inventive punch."

Den of Geek's Lacy Baugher said the finale was "truly unlike anything we've ever seen [the MCU] attempt before", giving it 4 out of 5 stars. Baugher noted that viewers may not believe the episode was a good ending to the season or Walters' story, but "it's certainly a memorable episode that takes big, ambitious swings, and in a franchise known for the safety and predictability of its formulas, that's a pretty big deal". She also enjoyed Ramos sending Pug to infiltrate Intelligencia calling that scene "a hilarious meta-commentary on misogyny and the state of superhero fandom today", noting "there's no way that the people who most need to see this message are actually watching She-Hulk". Amelia Emberwing at IGN gave the finale a 7 out of 10, calling it "a strong episode with meaningful moments". However, she noted Goldsberry was "criminally underused" in the episode and that Walters' story was "the episode's greatest sin" despite an "impeccable" performance from Maslany. As well, Emberwing said the finale did not do the revenge porn storyline set up in the previous episode justice, wishing the episode had either been longer or spent less time out in the real world to bring that storyline a "satisfying end".

Giving the episode a "B+", Arezou Amin from Collider said the finale was "by and large a satisfying one" but got frustrated with the fourth-wall break to the real world, calling it a "truly bizarre digression". Writing for The A.V. Club, Mary Kate Carr called "Whose Show Is This?" "a pretty good summary of the season as a whole" in that it was "an uneven episode to match an uneven season, but there were obviously still many enjoyable things about it". Reacting to Walters' confronting K.E.V.I.N., Carr said it was "a fun, zany way to give the lead female character agency, by having her literally fix her ending", however what Walters returned to in the series was "awkwardly half-dealt-with" without any climactic stakes. Specifically speaking to removing the blood plot line, Carr felt "erasing it from the finale retroactively undoes a plot that the show has been asking us to care about for the entire season, which is dissatisfying, to say the least", continuing "the finale feels a little too enamored with its own cleverness to deal with the serious emotional ramifications of that violation"; Carr gave the episode a "B–".

Walters entering Disney+ to leave her show and enter the real world was called "one of the finest visual gags of the streaming era", and "a perfect She-Hulk moment". /Film's Sandy Schaefer believed K.E.V.I.N. to be a "visual pun" to the "recurring problems with the MCU, big and small", and that this interaction was the MCU "having its cake and eating it". Rob Bricken from Gizmodo said the episode "wonderfully and wisely poked fun at the MCU template" and was glad it did not feature a large fight sequence as was originally considered. He was also enthralled by Maslany's facial expression after asking K.E.V.I.N. about the arrival of the X-Men, a moment that other commentators called "iconic". Collider's Alan Kelly called "Whose Show Is This?" "the most innovative installment" of Marvel's Disney+ content since WandaVision (2021).
