= Superhuman Law =

- She-Hulk: Attorney at Law episode
- Promotional poster
- Episode no.: Episode 2
- Directed by: Kat Coiro
- Written by: Jessica Gao
- Cinematography by: Florian Ballhaus
- Editing by: Jamie Gross; Stacey Schroeder; Tim Roche; Zene Baker
- Original release date: August 25, 2022
- Running time: 30 minutes

Cast
- Steve Coulter as Holden Holliway; Candice Rose as Aunt Melanie; Michael H. Cole as Uncle Tucker; Nicholas Cirillo as Cousin Ched; Drew Matthews as Dennis Bukowski

Episode chronology
← Previous "A Normal Amount of Rage"	Next → "The People vs. Emil Blonsky"

"Superhuman Law" is the second episode of the American television series She-Hulk: Attorney at Law, based on Marvel Comics featuring the character She-Hulk. It follows lawyer Jennifer Walters / She-Hulk as she is hired to run the superhero law division of Goodman, Lieber, Kurtzberg & Holliway (GLK&H), with her first case being to represent Emil Blonsky. The episode is set in the Marvel Cinematic Universe (MCU), sharing continuity with the films of the franchise. It was written by head writer Jessica Gao and directed by Kat Coiro.

Tatiana Maslany stars as Walters, alongside Josh Segarra, Ginger Gonzaga, Mark Linn-Baker, Tess Malis Kincaid, Mark Ruffalo, and Tim Roth (Blonsky). Gao was hired to write the episode and serve as head writer for the series by November 2019. Coiro joined the series by September 2020 to direct the majority of the series' episodes.

"Superhuman Law" was released on Disney+ on August 25, 2022.

== Plot ==
After defeating Titania with her new powers, Jennifer Walters is dubbed "She-Hulk" by the public despite her disliking of the name. Her employers at the district attorney's office fire her, however, due to the case being declared a mistrial. Walters goes to other law firms but gets the same response: being a famous superhero and a practicing attorney is both a "distraction" and a breach of legal ethics. Walters then gets an offer from the opposition in the earlier court case, Goodman, Lieber, Kurtzberg & Holliway (GLK&H). The firm's top partner, Holliway, asks her to take over as head of their newly created superhuman law division, but as the She-Hulk ― not Jennifer Walters.

Her first case is to represent Emil Blonsky for his parole, and initially refuses it due to Blonsky having attempted to kill her cousin Bruce Banner. (Note: As depicted in The Incredible Hulk (2008).) She goes to the Department of Damage Control supermax prison and meets Blonsky. Walters is convinced that Blonsky is genuinely remorseful for his crimes as Abomination and contacts Banner, who is traveling to Sakaar, for advice. Banner encourages her to take on the case. After calling Holliway, she sees that leaked footage of Blonsky participating in an underground fight club as the Abomination has been reported on the news. (Note: As depicted in Shang-Chi and the Legend of the Ten Rings (2021).)

== Production ==
=== Development ===
In August 2019, Marvel Studios announced that She-Hulk: Attorney at Law was being developed for the streaming service Disney+. That November, Jessica Gao was hired to serve as the head writer. In September 2020, Kat Coiro was hired to direct six episodes, including the second, and to executive produce the series. Executive producers include Marvel Studios' Kevin Feige, Louis D'Esposito, Victoria Alonso, and Brad Winderbaum, in addition to Coiro and Gao. The second episode, titled "Superhuman Law", was written by Gao, and was released on Disney+ on August 25, 2022. The series' subtitle was added during the editing process when Feige heard Hulk's line from the episode, "She-Hulk attorney at law, it's got a nice ring to it", and felt it would be a good title for the series. The episode's title card is altered to say She-Hulk: Attorney for Hire.

=== Writing ===
Bruce Banner is shown to be heading to space on the Sakaaran spaceship seen in the previous episode that caused the car accident that turned Jennifer Walters into She-Hulk. Gao said this decision was in part to conclude Banner's appearance in the series so viewers would not be expecting him in the remaining episodes, with Banner likely needing to "handle some off-world things" back on Sakaar from the time he spent there as shown in Thor: Ragnarok (2017). She continued that this "opens up the possibility" for Marvel Studios to "do something with that, to pick up that story". Coiro also indicated that this tied to future MCU projects; the storyline was followed up in the final episode of the season with the introduction of Hulk's son, Skaar.

A website Walters looks at for potential new career opportunities includes news articles that reference a man fighting in a bar with metal claws, which commentators believed indicated the existence of the X-Men character Wolverine in the MCU, as well as referencing the Celestial stuck in the ocean as seen in Eternals (2021).

=== Casting ===
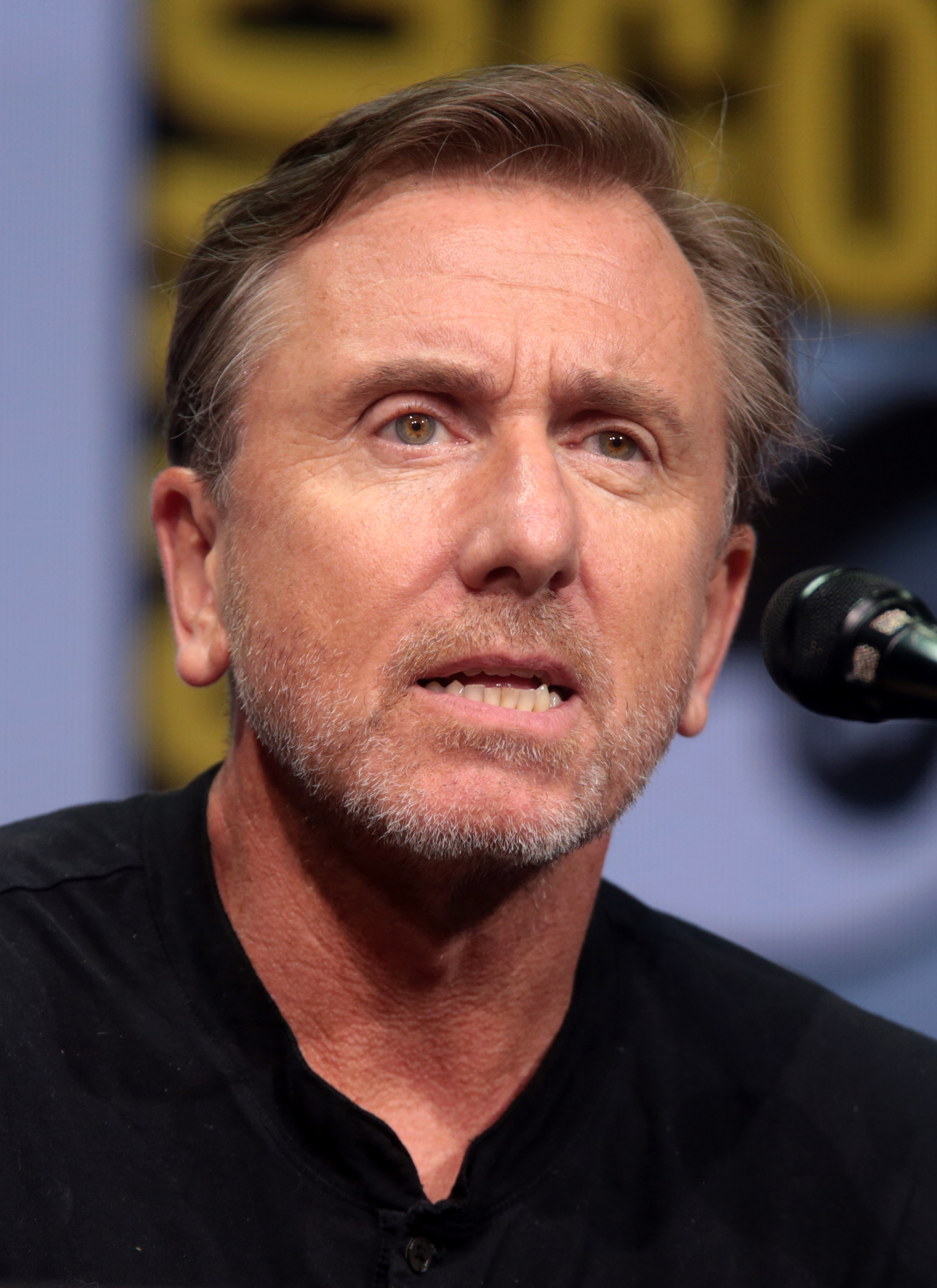
Tim Roth reprises his role as Emil Blonsky in the episode for the first time since The Incredible Hulk (2008).

The episode stars Tatiana Maslany as Jennifer Walters / She-Hulk, Josh Segarra as Augustus "Pug" Pugliese, Ginger Gonzaga as Nikki Ramos, Mark Linn-Baker as Morris Walters, Tess Malis Kincaid as Elaine Walters, Mark Ruffalo as Bruce Banner / Smart Hulk, and Tim Roth as Emil Blonsky. Also starring are Steve Coulter as Holden Holliway, Candice Rose as Aunt Melanie, Michael H. Cole as Uncle Tucker, Nicholas Cirillo as Cousin Ched, and Drew Matthews as Dennis Bukowski. News anchors Jovana Lara, John Gregory, and Rachel Brown appear as themselves.

=== Filming and visual effects ===
Filming occurred at Trilith Studios in Atlanta, Georgia, with Coiro directing the episode, and Florian Ballhaus serving as cinematographer. Walters and Ramos talking in the bar was the first scene shot on the series. Ruffalo improvised the word "literally" in the line alluding to the recasting of Banner from Edward Norton to him after The Incredible Hulk (2008), with Gao feeling if it had been included in the script, Marvel Studios might have "flagged it" to be removed. Ruffalo called the line "really funny" and "just the reality that we all are often dancing around", while Maslany said this was "as meta as you can possibly get". The legal comedy Ally McBeal (1997-2002) is playing on the bar television as an Easter egg and was included during post-production. Coiro had access to Shang-Chi and the Legend of the Ten Rings (2021) to choose the footage that was most appropriate for the series.

Visual effects for the episode were created by Trixter, Wylie Co, Cantina Creative, SDFX Studios, Capital T, FuseFX, and Lightstage.

=== Music ===
The following songs are featured in the episode: "Stop This Flame" by Celeste, "Scratch" by Aaron Childs, "Before I Go" by Sarah May, and "Feeling Better" by Louise Dowd and Jeremy Abbott.

== Marketing ==
A QR code was included in the episode that allowed viewers to access a free digital copy of She-Hulk (2004) #1. After the episode's release, Marvel announced merchandise inspired by the episode as part of its weekly "Marvel Must Haves" promotion for each episode of the series, including apparel for Abomination and the Superhuman Law Division, a She-Hulk pin, and an Abomination Funko Pop. Additionally, the series' Twitter account revealed some of Blonsky's haikus.

== Reception ==
=== Viewership ===
According to market research company Parrot Analytics, which looks at consumer engagement in consumer research, streaming, downloads, and on social media, She-Hulk: Attorney at Law experienced a strong second week, with a demand of 40.6 times the average series in its first full week since premiering. Nielsen Media Research, which records streaming viewership on U.S. television screens, calculated that it was the ninth-most watched original series across streaming services for the week of August 22 to 28, 2022 with 390 million minutes watched. The streaming aggregator Reelgood, which monitors real-time data from 5 million users in the U.S. for original and acquired streaming programs and movies across subscription video-on-demand (SVOD) and ad-supported video-on-demand (AVOD) services, reported that She-Hulk: Attorney at Law was the second most-streamed series for the week ending August 27, 2022, and was the fourth most-streamed program overall for the week ending August 31, 2022. Whip Media, which tracks viewership data for the more than 21 million worldwide users of its TV Time app, calculated that it was the second most-streamed original series for the week ending August 28, 2022.

=== Critical response ===
The review aggregator website Rotten Tomatoes reports an 88% approval rating with an average rating of 7.20/10, based on 121 reviews. The site's critical consensus reads, "Jennifer Walters defends a supervillain, but this sophomore episode is no Abomination as it fleshes out She-Hulk's courtroom conceit with frothy flair."

Jenna Scherer at The A.V. Club gave the episode a "B–", calling it "fitting" that the series started to explore how Walters is now perceived by others now that she is known to be She-Hulk. Scherer felt it was an "odd" and "confusing" choice to reintroduce Blonsky to the MCU given how long it was since he was last seen, but conceded it was likely because of Roth, saying it was "a joy to see Roth play a lighter, sillier version of this character". Giving the episode 3 out of 5 stars, Kirsten Howard from Den of Geek found this episode to be "a much better introduction to Jen" than the previous episode since "Superhuman Law" allowed the viewers to "spend time with Jen and her circle, which felt like a better place to start properly caring about her character". Walters' family dinner provided "some great context to her upbringing and character" for Howard, who felt Gao created "more of a frustrating clash between the good men in Jen's life and the bad men outside that bubble". They also enjoyed Roth's appearance in the episode.

IGN's Amelia Emberwing said the second episode showed no signs of slowing the series' "hilarious momentum". She felt the episode highlighted more of She-Hulk's supporting characters, particularly Ramos and Pugliese, and stated, "Director Kat Coiro and writer Jessica Gao make a point to highlight the extremely silly situations ladies — hero or otherwise — find themselves in every day, continuing the extreme relatability of the series for anyone existing as a woman." Emberwing gave the episode an 8 out of 10. Giving the episode a "B+", Collider's Arezou Amin enjoyed the series continuing commentary on the nature of superheroes in the MCU and was impressed by "how much personal character stuff they managed to fit in the relatively short run time". She also hoped She-Hulk would continue to explore the role of one's appearance without portraying She-Hulk as "clumsy or oafish".

Daniel Chin of The Ringer felt "Superhuman Law" did "a much better job of setting the stage for She-Hulk and showcasing its potential as a low-stakes comedy series" than the first episode. Gizmodo's Germain Lussier said, "Overall, She-Hulk's second episode was a very strong episode of TV that both really turned the focus back on Jen and her journey while also providing a ton of great MCU connections... it's already impressively propulsive and planting seeds for a lot more to come."
