= Ribbit and Rip It =

- She-Hulk: Attorney at Law episode
- The chemistry between Matt Murdock (L) and Jennifer Walters (R) was considered one of the highlights of the episode.
- Episode no.: Episode 8
- Directed by: Kat Coiro
- Written by: Cody Ziglar
- Cinematography by: Florian Ballhaus
- Editing by: Jamie Gross
- Original release date: October 6, 2022
- Running time: 36 minutes

Cast
- Trevor Salter as Josh Miller

Episode chronology
← Previous "The Retreat"	Next → "Whose Show Is This?"

"Ribbit and Rip It" is the eighth episode of the American television series She-Hulk: Attorney at Law, based on Marvel Comics featuring the character She-Hulk. It follows Jennifer Walters / She-Hulk joining Matt Murdock / Daredevil in looking for a fashion designer who was kidnapped by one of Walters' clients. The episode is set in the Marvel Cinematic Universe (MCU), sharing continuity with the films of the franchise. It was written by Cody Ziglar and directed by Kat Coiro.

Tatiana Maslany stars as Walters, alongside Josh Segarra, Ginger Gonzaga, Jon Bass, Griffin Matthews, Steve Coulter, Mark Linn-Baker, Tess Malis Kincaid, Charlie Cox (Murdock), Renée Elise Goldsberry, and Brandon Stanley. Coiro joined the series by September 2020 to direct the majority of the series' episodes.

"Ribbit and Rip It" was released on Disney+ on October 6, 2022. The episode received positive reviews, with critics highlighting Daredevil's appearance, as well as Cox's performance of the character and the chemistry between Maslany and Cox.

== Plot ==
Jennifer Walters takes on a new case representing Eugene Patilio / Leap-Frog, the son of Goodman, Lieber, Kurtzberg & Holliway client Vincent Patilio, who wishes to sue Luke Jacobson for having provided him with a faulty super-suit. Jacobson is represented by Matt Murdock in court, who manages to win the case due to Patilio inadvertently revealing that he disregarded Jacobson's instructions by using jet fuel for his rocket boots. Murdock and Walters meet later at a bar; he advises her that she is in a unique position to help others, as an attorney and as She-Hulk.

Later that night, Patilio contacts Walters asking for help against an unknown assailant. Walters arrives and battles the assailant, who she discovers to be Murdock in his vigilante persona Daredevil. Murdock reveals to Walters that Patilio kidnapped Jacobson in order to improve his suit and make suits for his followers, the Tadpoles. Walters and Murdock work together to rescue Jacobson. Leap-Frog tries to escape by jumping out the window, only to injure himself. The Tadpoles are arrested while Leap-Frog is taken away on a stretcher. Walters later has sex with Murdock at her home.

The next evening, Walters attends the Southern California Law Awards gala where she accepts the Female Lawyer of the Year award (alongside five other female attorneys), but the gala is interrupted by an Intelligencia broadcast, which smears Walters' reputation by displaying footage of her in bed with Josh Miller. Walters goes into a rage and destroys the gala stage. She attempts to capture an Intelligencia member nearby, but she is stopped by Department of Damage Control agents, enabling the Intelligencia member to get away.

== Production ==
=== Development ===
In August 2019, Marvel Studios announced that She-Hulk: Attorney at Law was being developed for the streaming service Disney+. In September 2020, Kat Coiro was hired to direct six episodes, including the eighth, and to executive produce the series. When the series was entering production, the plot revolving around Jennifer Walters' origin was intended for the eighth episode, before ultimately moving to the first episode of the series in post-production. Executive producers include Marvel Studios' Kevin Feige, Louis D'Esposito, Victoria Alonso, and Brad Winderbaum, in addition to Coiro and head writer Jessica Gao. The eighth episode, titled "Ribbit and Rip It", was written by Cody Ziglar, and was released on Disney+ on October 6, 2022.

=== Writing ===
Including Matt Murdock / Daredevil in the series made logical sense to Gao since both he and Walters were lawyers who also happened to be superheroes, and Murdock could show Walters that a balance between the two was possible. The arrival of Murdock is an annoyance to Walters because he "came out of nowhere and showed her up" in court and also "takes the high road" afterwards at the bar by buying her a drink. After they continue talking, Walters eventually becomes impressed with Murdock and begins to feel the two have a connection, though initially misinterprets him needing to leave suddenly for him not being interested. Gao noted the writers' room was hoping the two would have "amazing chemistry" and explained that the writers crafted their dynamic to "have this kind of Howard Hawks, very quick back and forth where they're attracted to each other" but are not letting each other know. Eventually Murdock and Walters hook up, which was always the hope from the writers because they believed Murdock "seemed like the right dude for her".

Marvel.com described the character's appearance as "very much the same Matt Murdock audiences have come to know and love", with actor Charlie Cox stating "it should be and it is always the same character. The difference is just like with people, we morph and change and are very different based on what's going on in our lives", with him adapting his portrayal of the character from Marvel's Netflix television series to make his appearance "appropriate" to fit the tone of She-Hulk, portraying Murdock in a good place in his life and making him "a bit cheeky and a bit flirty". Cox called it "a really great experiment" for himself and the character to see how Murdock would fit in a more lighthearted setting than what he did with the character in Daredevil (2015–2018), working to ensure he did not become "the butt of the joke [in the episode] because he's overly serious". Gao and the writers were never given explicit indication either way if they should approach Murdock as the same from the Netflix series or not. The episode also sets up a hallway fight with Daredevil, a prominent set piece from the Daredevil series, only for She-Hulk to crash through the ceiling to break up the fight; this was another moment in the series Gao and the writers used to be meta and subvert a trope by "acknowledg[ing] and teas[ing] the classic Daredevil hallway fight" only to "undercut it" with She-Hulk's entrance.

"Ribbit and Rip It" reveals that the Sokovia Accords, a set of laws introduced in the film Captain America: Civil War (2016) that required superhumans to register and be controlled by the government, had been repealed. The writers had inquired if they could mention the Accords and were told by Marvel Studios leadership that they could state they had been repealed. The end of the episode sees Walters unleash her rage upon seeing the Intelligencia's captured footage of her private life broadcast for the entire audience at her Female Lawyer of the Year gala. Actress Tatiana Maslany believed this moment was "massively justified" for Walters adding that it makes her look like a monster "because of the outward perception of that anger and how it looks from the outside". This outburst also follows through on advice Walters receives from her cousin Bruce Banner / Hulk in the first episode about how if she was not careful with her Hulk abilities, the public would only see her as a monster; the writers worked to hint at this eventual outburst throughout the series.

=== Casting ===
The episode stars Tatiana Maslany as Jennifer Walters / She-Hulk, Josh Segarra as Augustus "Pug" Pugliese, Ginger Gonzaga as Nikki Ramos, Jon Bass as Todd Phelps, Griffin Matthews as Luke Jacobson, Steve Coulter as Holden Holliway, Mark Linn-Baker as Morris Walters, Tess Malis Kincaid as Elaine Walters, Charlie Cox as Matt Murdock / Daredevil, Renée Elise Goldsberry as Mallory Book, and Brandon Stanley as Eugene Patilio / Leap-Frog. Also starring in the episode is Trevor Salter as Josh Miller.

=== Filming and visual effects ===
Filming occurred at Trilith Studios in Atlanta, Georgia, with Coiro directing the episode, and Florian Ballhaus serving as cinematographer. Coiro worked to find a balance when portraying sex in the series, without it going "too far" or being "taboo". She paid homage to "the 2000s rom coms tropes" when she panned over Walters and Murdock's costumes when they get together, but felt it was also "something totally new because it was batons and helmets, instead of clothing", and called the scene "very suggestive" while still being "accessible for all ages". Murdock's walk of shame was originally the episode's mid-credits scene, but was moved within the episode where Coiro felt it "played rhythmically better".

Jamie Gross was the editor of the episode, with Corio praising her work, calling Gross "the world's biggest Daredevil fan" knowing "all of his history and... Easter eggs" that was reflected in her editing choices. Visual effects for the series were created by Digital Domain, Wētā FX, Wylie Co., Cantina Creative, FuseFX, SDFX Studios, Capital T, Keep Me Posted, WeFX, and Lightstage.

=== Music ===
The following songs are featured in the episode: "Let's Werk" by Julisa Wilson, "Last Exit to Brooklyn" by Dr. Steven Trip and Lawrence Sam Goldings, "Honey" by Chibia, "Happy Birds" by Vince Webb, "Next Big Thing" by West Rose, "Rude" by Shygirl, "Dominique" by Ela Minus, and "Second Thought" by Bill Anschell. A rendition of the main theme from Daredevil by John Paesano, "Daredevil", is also played in the episode.

== Marketing ==
Ahead of the episode's release, Marvel released a video promoting the appearance of Leap-Frog in the episode, with cast members from the series such as Maslany, Gonzaga, and Mark Ruffalo, as well as Kermit the Frog, auditioning for the part. Germain Lussier from Gizmodo believed the video was purely a way to further "mess" with fan's anticipations for the arrival of Daredevil in the series, while John Dodge from Comic Book Resources also believing the video was a "troll" by Marvel. ComicBook.com's Kofi Outlaw felt the promo gave Leap-Frog the same "vibes" as Lubeman from the HBO series Watchmen.

A QR code was included in the episode that allowed viewers to access a free digital copy of She-Hulk (2014) #9. After the episode's release, Marvel announced merchandise inspired by the episode as part of its weekly "Marvel Must Haves" promotion for each episode of the series, including a She-Hulk Funko Pop, apparel, and accessories.

== Reception ==
=== Viewership ===
According to market research company Parrot Analytics, which looks at consumer engagement in consumer research, streaming, downloads, and on social media, She-Hulk: Attorney at Law dropped to fourth place in the breakout shows rankings, which are defined as the most in-demand series that have premiered in the past 100 days, for the week of October 8–14, 2022, with a demand level of 38 times the average series. This represented a 17% increase from the previous week. Nielsen Media Research, which records streaming viewership on U.S. television screens, reported that it was the seventh-most watched original series across streaming services for the week of October 3–9, 2022, with 454 million minutes watched, a 13.6% increase from the previous week. Whip Media, which tracks viewership data for the more than 21 million worldwide users of its TV Time app, calculated that She-Hulk: Attorney at Law was the most-streamed original series the U.S. for the week ending October 9, 2022.

=== Critical response ===
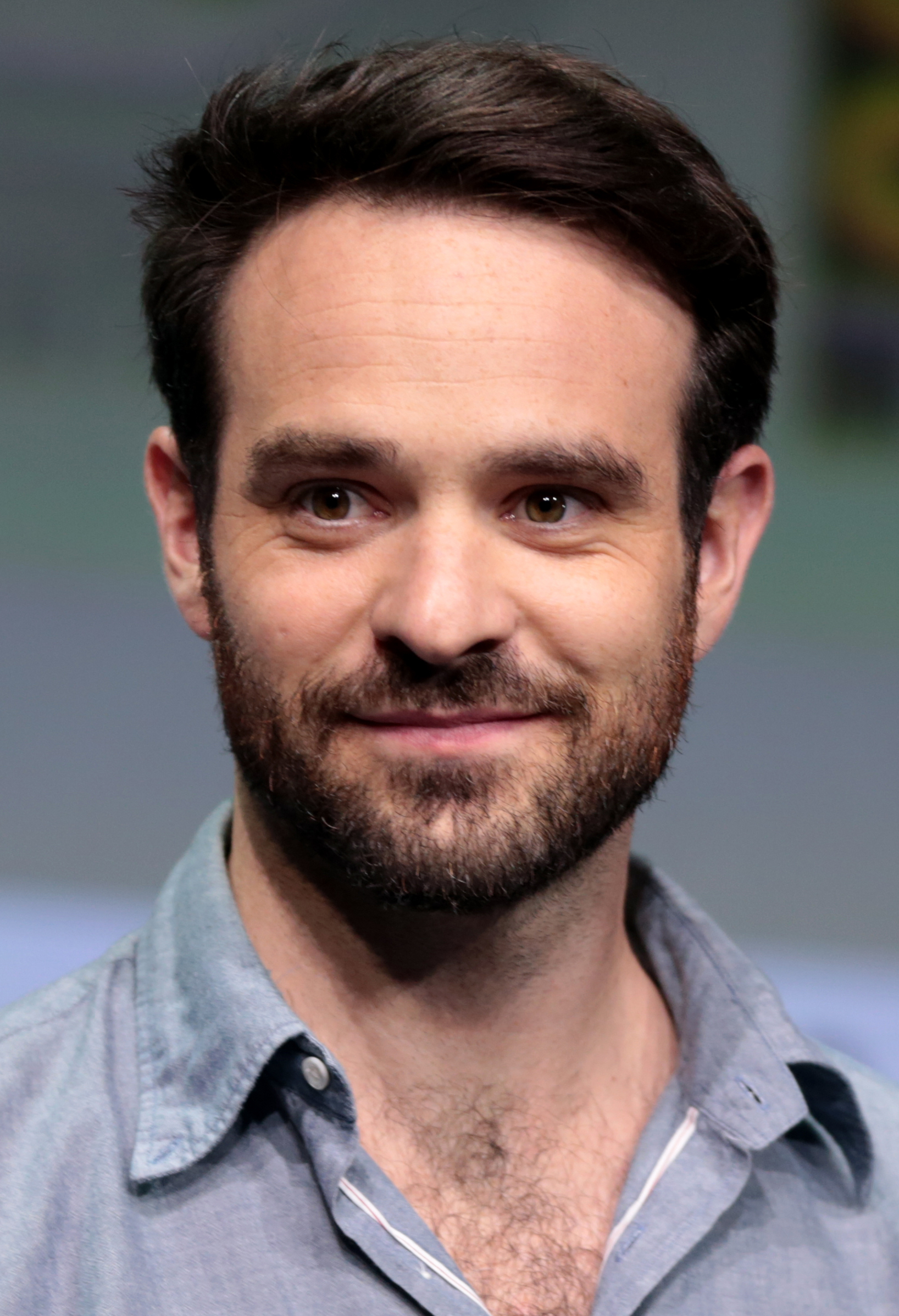
Critics highlighted Charlie Cox's appearance as Daredevil in the episode and his chemistry with Maslany.

The review aggregator website Rotten Tomatoes reports a 95% approval rating with an average rating of 8.50/10, based on 22 reviews. The site's critical consensus reads, "Daredevil finally makes his long-awaited debut on She-Hulk to delightful effect in "Ribbit and Rip It," with Tatiana Maslany and Charlie Cox's chemistry immediately making for one of the MCU's most lovable pairings."

Lacy Baugher, writing for Den of Geek, gave the episode 5 stars out of 5, exclaiming that "Ribbit and Rip It" was the series' "best episode yet", since "it finally achieves what feels like a perfect balance of thrilling action and offbeat procedural humor, set within the larger question of what it means for Jennifer Walters to be not just a female superhero, but a female Hulk". Daredevil's appearance was also a highlight, with Baugher stating She-Hulk "gets everything about Matt Murdock right" and enjoying how the episode provide a quick overview of the character for those unfamiliar with him from the Netflix series. Baugher approved of Walters' reaction to seeing the Intelligencia footage, and was intrigued by the series presenting "how uncomfortable an angry woman makes people and how quickly they are willing to turn on that same woman when she doesn't express that anger in a way that they approve of". Collider's Arezou Amin gave the episode an "A–", calling it "back in fine form" after not enjoying the previous episode. Amin called Cox's performance as Murdock "understated and utterly charming" and was glad the character was accessible to viewers who may not have seen any of the Netflix Marvel series. She questioned the use of revenge porn as a story point in the series, though agreed with Walters' reaction of destroying the screens as "appropriate to the situation" and hoped the final episode did not resolve the Intelligencia material by have Walters realize she was wrong to react as she did.

Mary Kate Carr from The A.V. Club gave the episode an "A", enjoying Daredevil's appearance and the chemistry between Maslany and Cox. Regarding the ending, Carr called it "a bit on the nose as far as commentary on the female experience" and something that was "difficult to pull off tonally when the rest of the series is so zany and lighthearted" but that it felt like the "logical end result" for the character. Alex Stedman of IGN called the episode the series' best, with "heavy emotional and plot stakes, [while] still sneaking in a little bit of sitcom goodness. It is, in more ways than one, the episode we've all been waiting for." Stedman said Daredevil's appearance a "crucial role" for the episode and Walters' character arc, and praised the chemistry between Maslany and Cox, giving "Ribbit and Rip It" a 9 out of 10.

Gizmodo's Germain Lussier said the episode "truly... bring[s] everything She-Hulk: Attorney at Law has been leading to together". Brett White at Decider said the episode was "worth the wait" and was enthralled by Walters and Murdock hooking up, since that was something the two had never done in the comics, despite both comic-versions of the characters being some of the "more sexually adventurous characters" in Marvel Comics, and thematically fit Walters' arc for the series. He concluded that "Ribbit and Rip It" was "like a comic book come to life".

Discussing the Daredevil hallway fight in April 2026, Casey Loving at TheWrap called it a "fun bit" that fit with She-Hulk's approach to the character since it "stays true to the character while placing him in a more playful environment". He ranked the fight fifth out of the character's seven hallway fights to date.

=== Accolades ===
Cox was named an honorable mention for TVLine's "Performer of the Week" for the week of October 8, 2022, for his performance in this episode. The site said he "didn't miss a step" reprising the role, "effortlessly slipp[ing] back into the Daredevil swagger".
