= The People vs. Emil Blonsky =

- She-Hulk: Attorney at Law episode
- Promotional poster
- Episode no.: Episode 3
- Directed by: Kat Coiro
- Written by: Francesca Gailes; Jacqueline J. Gailes
- Cinematography by: Florian Ballhaus
- Editing by: Stacey Schroeder
- Original release date: September 1, 2022
- Running time: 34 minutes

Cast
- Steve Coulter as Holden Holliway; Nick Gomez as Wrecker; Justin Eaton as Thunderball; Drew Matthews as Dennis Bukowski; Peg O'Keef as Runa; George Bryant as Judge Price

Episode chronology
← Previous "Superhuman Law"	Next → "Is This Not Real Magic?"

"The People vs. Emil Blonsky" is the third episode of the American television series She-Hulk: Attorney at Law, based on Marvel Comics featuring the character She-Hulk. It follows lawyer Jennifer Walters / She-Hulk as she tries to get her client, Emil Blonsky / Abomination, released from prison. The episode is set in the Marvel Cinematic Universe (MCU), sharing continuity with the films of the franchise. It was written by Francesca Gailes and Jacqueline J. Gailes, and directed by Kat Coiro.

Tatiana Maslany stars as Walters, alongside Josh Segarra, Ginger Gonzaga, Megan Thee Stallion, Benedict Wong, Renée Elise Goldsberry, and Tim Roth (Blonsky). Coiro joined the series by September 2020 to direct the majority of the series' episodes.

"The People vs. Emil Blonsky" was released on Disney+ on September 1, 2022.

== Plot ==
Jennifer Walters confronts her client, Emil Blonsky, about escaping prison and fighting in an underground fight club; (Note: As depicted in Shang-Chi and the Legend of the Ten Rings (2021).) Blonsky explains that he was removed from his cell by the Sorcerer Supreme Wong, and that he returned to prison willingly afterwards. While Walters attempts to contact Wong, the news of her appointment as Blonsky's lawyer stirs up public controversy. Walters' former colleague, Dennis Bukowski, approaches GLK&H with a case involving his ex-girlfriend Runa, a shapeshifting Light Elf from New Asgard who defrauded him by impersonating Megan Thee Stallion; the case is assigned to Walters' coworker Augustus "Pug" Pugliese. Wong meets with Walters and agrees to testify at Blonsky's parole hearing.

During the hearing, Wong and several other witnesses give testimonies supporting Blonsky's case for parole, and Blonsky satisfies the question of whether he might lose control of his powers by demonstrating his ability to retain his rational mind as the Abomination and shift back into human form with little effort. Walters later helps Pug to win his case and even gets to work with the real Megan Thee Stallion, while Runa is sanctioned by the court for trying to impersonate the judge. Blonsky is released on parole but must wear a special device created by Banner that prevents him from transforming. As She-Hulk, Walters gives a televised interview to tell her story. Later, while going home, Walters is attacked by the Wrecking Crew, a four-man criminal group armed with stolen Asgardian construction tools. They attempt to take a sample of her blood, but the needle breaks, and She-Hulk forces them to retreat.

== Production ==
=== Development ===
In August 2019, Marvel Studios announced that She-Hulk: Attorney at Law was being developed for the streaming service Disney+. In September 2020, Kat Coiro was hired to direct six episodes, including the third, and to executive produce the series. Executive producers include Marvel Studios' Kevin Feige, Louis D'Esposito, Victoria Alonso, and Brad Winderbaum, in addition to Coiro and head writer Jessica Gao. The third episode, titled "The People vs. Emil Blonsky", was written by Francesca Gailes and Jacqueline J. Gailes, and was released on Disney+ on September 1, 2022.

=== Writing ===
Head writer Jessica Gao's original pitch for the series had featured more of Emil Blonsky / Abomination's trial, which would have spanned multiple episodes. As the writers began to develop the series, they realized they would not have been able to write "rousing trial scenes" and shifted how they discussed the character in the series. Gao said the line in the episode regarding all of the cameos came about during post-production when "it really felt like there were a lot of cameos", and staying in line with the character, Jennifer Walters breaks the fourth wall to address it with the audience. The comments used during the social media backlash to She-Hulk were inspired by real misogynistic comments written on Marvel's social media channels following the announcement of the series in 2019.

Rapper Megan Thee Stallion appears as herself in the episode, given an Asgardian shapeshifter catfishes Dennis Bukowski by posing as the rapper. Gao explained that they were looking for "a famous, beautiful, successful woman" to be the person the Asgardian impersonated, and that the story would have been adjusted for whoever was cast in the part. Series actress Jameela Jamil suggested Megan after they both worked together on the television series Legendary (2020–present). The creatives "all lost [their] minds" at this suggestion because, as Coiro explained, she was "perfect on so many levels, just as a beautiful young celebrity who would never date Dennis Bukowski, but also as a powerful woman who embodies a lot of what She-Hulk embodies".

Coiro felt the scene of Walters being attacked by the Wrecking Crew and then realizing she could change to She-Hulk and fight back was "a wish fulfillment for any woman who's ever lived in the world". Gao noted the writers were able to adapt and reinvent the Wrecking Crew as they saw fit for the series.

=== Casting ===
The episode stars Tatiana Maslany as Jennifer Walters / She-Hulk, Josh Segarra as Augustus "Pug" Pugliese, Ginger Gonzaga as Nikki Ramos, Megan Thee Stallion as herself, Benedict Wong as Wong, Renée Elise Goldsberry as Mallory Book, and Tim Roth as Emil Blonsky / Abomination. Also starring are Steve Coulter as Holden Holliway, Nick Gomez as Wrecker, Justin Eaton as Thunderball, Drew Matthews as Dennis Bukowski, Peg O'Keef as Runa, and George Bryant as Judge Price. News anchors John Gregory, Bob DeCastro, Jessica Rodriguez, Karla Martinez, and Raul Gonzelez appear as themselves.

=== Filming and visual effects ===
Filming occurred at Trilith Studios in Atlanta, Georgia, with Coiro directing the episode, and Florian Ballhaus serving as cinematographer. Coiro had access to Shang-Chi and the Legend of the Ten Rings (2021) to choose the footage that was most appropriate for the series.

External videos
- Let's get t'werk 😜 presents Maslany in her motion capture suit twerking with Megan Thee Stallion, interspersed with other moments of Maslany dancing from the season, video tweet from She-Hulk: Attorney at Law's account

The episode's mid-credits scene sees She-Hulk taking on Megan Thee Stallion as a client and dancing and twerking with her in her office. This was added on the day of filming because Maslany was a big fan of the rapper and the creatives wanted to give Maslany a scene with her. Maslany called dancing and filming the mid-credits scene the "greatest day [and moment] of my life", and both her and Gao hoped Marvel would release the behind the scenes version of it with her dancing in the motion capture suit. Marvel eventually released the footage following the release of the final episode.

Visual effects for the episode were created by Digital Domain, Wētā FX, Trixter, Wylie Co, Cantina Creative, SDFX Studios, Capital T, Keep Me Posted, WeFX, and Lightstage.

=== Music ===
The following songs are featured in the episode: "VIP" by Sam Garay, "Go Easy On My Love" by Stuart Barry Maxfield and Aaron David Anderson, "Seize the Power" by Yonaka, and "Body" by Megan Thee Stallion.

== Marketing ==
A QR code was included in the episode that allowed viewers to access a free digital copy of Savage She-Hulk (1980) #2. After the episode's release, Marvel announced merchandise inspired by the episode as part of its weekly "Marvel Must Haves" promotion for each episode of the series, including a She-Hulk-inspired make-up set from Urban Decay, apparel for She-Hulk, and Megamojis of She-Hulk and Hulk.

== Reception ==
=== Viewership ===
According to market research company Parrot Analytics, which looks at consumer engagement in consumer research, streaming, downloads, and on social media, She-Hulk: Attorney at Law maintained its strong position in second place on the breakout shows chart, which are defined as the most in-demand series that have premiered in the past 100 days, for the week of August 27 to September 2, 2022, despite a minor 4% decline in demand. The series managed to have 38.8 times the average series demand. Nielsen Media Research, which records streaming viewership on U.S. television screens, reported that it was the sixth-most watched original series across streaming services for the week of August 29 to September 4, 2022, with 472 million minutes watched, a 21% increase from the previous week. Whip Media, which tracks viewership data for the more than 21 million worldwide users of its TV Time app, calculated that She-Hulk: Attorney at Law was the most-steamed original series in the U.S. for the week ending September 4, 2022.

=== Critical response ===
The review aggregator website Rotten Tomatoes reports an 86% approval rating with an average rating of 7.20/10, based on 118 reviews. The site's critical consensus reads, "With its ample set-up finally out of the way, She-Hulk navigates Walters' first super-sized court case in an amusing installment full of nifty cameos."

IGN's Amelia Emberwing gave the episode an 8 out of 10, saying it "does a good job of highlighting the sheer ridiculousness of the MCU to a normal party with no interest in being a part of the supernatural side of things". She felt Segarra was given a "real opportunity to shine" as Pugliese in the episode, and overall the series was still doing a good job of keeping the focus on Walters amidst the many cameos. She did note that some fans could become "frustrated" at the lack of constant story progression, which is expected in the MCU but does not fit the sitcom model. Giving the episode an "A–", Arezou Amin at Collider said the episode "manages to blend the superhero side of things in very well with what will hopefully remain the procedural nature of the series". She enjoyed Blonsky's parole hearing, feeling Roth was able to "really show off his comedic timing" and was "just a delight to watch".

Writing for The A.V. Club, Jenna Scherer said the episode was "a roundabout way to retcon an explanation" for Abomination's "confusing" cameo appearance in Shang-Chi and the Legend of the Ten Rings with a low stakes storyline. Regarding the storyline with Pugliese and Bukowski, Scherer called it "initially entertaining [that] wears out its welcome in short order" since Bukowski is "a woefully one-note character", though it was "worth it" for the Megan Thee Stallion cameo. The social media response to Walters being She-Hulk was the series' "most scathing meta satire to date" since Scherer believed it echoed real-life comments from misogynist fans who believe the introduction of more female heroes to the MCU results in the male heroes having less prominence; she gave the episode a "B–". In his review of the episode, Alec Bojalad from Den of Geek gave the episode 3.5 out of 5 stars, believing the series was "still finding its voice in the early goings" though much of the series' humor began to land with this episode. Having both Abomination and Wong appear in the episode made the episode feel "truly connected to a larger universe" for Bojalad, who also enjoyed the sight gag in the end credits artwork of Blonksy leaving his seven wives. Despite the mid-credits scene being "an absolute hurricane of cringe", he believed it was a "litmus test" for the viewers, because "[h]ow one feels about a painfully earnest moment featuring a giant CGI woman dancing with music superstar Megan Thee Stallion likely informs how one feels about She-Hulk at large". He continued that the scene was "weirdly a watershed moment" for Marvel Studios' television series, since She-Hulk: Attorney at Law had broken from the past model of Disney+ series that presented them as longer MCU films broken up into episodes and "adopted a more TV-friendly procedural format" while also "alter[ing] the usual Marvel tone".
