= A Normal Amount of Rage =

- She-Hulk: Attorney at Law episode
- Promotional poster
- Episode no.: Episode 1
- Directed by: Kat Coiro
- Written by: Jessica Gao
- Cinematography by: Florian Ballhaus
- Editing by: Jamie Gross; Stacey Schroeder; Zene Baker
- Original release date: August 18, 2022
- Running time: 38 minutes

Cast
- Steve Coulter as Holden Holliway; Drew Matthews as Dennis Bukowski

Episode chronology
← Previous —	Next → "Superhuman Law"

"A Normal Amount of Rage" is the first episode of the American television series She-Hulk: Attorney at Law, based on Marvel Comics featuring the character She-Hulk. It follows Jennifer Walters, a lawyer who becomes the 6-foot-7-inch (2.01-meter) She-Hulk after her blood is accidentally cross-contaminated with her cousin Bruce Banner's. The episode is set in the Marvel Cinematic Universe (MCU), sharing continuity with the films of the franchise. It was written by head writer Jessica Gao and directed by Kat Coiro.

Tatiana Maslany stars as Walters, alongside Jameela Jamil, Ginger Gonzaga, and Mark Ruffalo (Banner). Gao was hired to write the episode and serve as head writer for the series by November 2019. Coiro joined the series by September 2020 to direct the majority of the series' episodes.

"A Normal Amount of Rage" was released on Disney+ on August 18, 2022. Critics enjoyed the chemistry between Maslany and Ruffalo and were mostly positive to the episode's visual effects.

== Plot ==
During a road trip, lawyer Jennifer Walters and her cousin Bruce Banner are intercepted by a Sakaaran spaceship and crash their car. Walters, while attempting to get Banner to safety, is accidentally contaminated by his blood when it drips into a wound on her arm, causing her to transform into a Hulk and run away. Banner tracks down his cousin and subdues her after she gives into her rage and threatens a group of catcalling men. Banner secretly takes his cousin to a private lab in Mexico, where he explains that she shares a special genetic condition with him that allows their bodies to process gamma radiation, explaining how his blood gave her the same powers as him.

Banner insists that she stay with him until she learns to control her anger and master her abilities as a Hulk. Though she is able to effortlessly handle Banner's training regime, Walters rejects becoming a superhero like him, requiring her to abandon her normal life and career. She attempts to leave but is stopped by Banner, and the two fight. Banner reluctantly accepts Walters' wish to return to her normal life and bids her farewell. A few months later, Walters is in court and Titania bursts in and attacks the bailiffs. Walters reluctantly transform into She-Hulk, easily beats Titania, and reverting to normal delivers her closing statement.

== Production ==
=== Development ===
In August 2019, Marvel Studios announced that She-Hulk: Attorney at Law was being developed for the streaming service Disney+. That November, Jessica Gao was hired to serve as the head writer. In September 2020, Kat Coiro was hired to direct the first episode plus five others, and to executive produce the series. Executive producers include Marvel Studios' Kevin Feige, Louis D'Esposito, Victoria Alonso, and Brad Winderbaum, in addition to Coiro and Gao. The first episode, titled "A Normal Amount of Rage", was written by Gao, and was released on Disney+ on August 18, 2022.

=== Writing ===
Jennifer Walters' origin story as She-Hulk is similar to her origin in the comics, in both cases caused by cousin Bruce Banner / Hulk's blood. Marvel Studios did not want a mob hit to be used in her origin, as it had been in the comics. Gao also felt that Banner in the Marvel Cinematic Universe (MCU) had been tortured by being the Hulk, and that he would not willingly choose to put that curse on someone else by deliberately giving her a blood transfusion. Gao wanted to get to the origin story quickly and not spend a whole episode "setting something up", so by having Walters being in a car accident with Banner and be accidentally contaminated by his blood, Gao felt that it took "a lot of the pressure off of the guilt that Bruce would feel having given this to Jennifer". The car accident occurs due to the appearance of a Sakaaran spaceship looking for Banner; Banner's response to its appearance is resolved in the next episode. Gao felt the scene with the woman helping Walters' in the bar bathroom following the car crash was the "single most important scene" to the episode, because it showed how a women's bathroom "is the most safe, protective, and supportive environment" and women are willing to help each other in there, even if they are depicted as "catty and bitchy" outside it. Gao noted the scene had almost been removed from the episode because "a lot of people didn't understand it".

[W]e underestimated, or at least I did, people's familiarity with this character. Because I knew this character, inside and out, and she was always my favorite in the comics, I really took for granted that everybody would know who she was, how she got these powers, and her relationship to Bruce. I just took for granted that everybody would know this, but not a lot of people are familiar with her. People who watched it, test audiences, really wanted to know more about her. They were having trouble. It was the elephant in the room, and they couldn't get past it.

— Writer Jessica Gao on the reasoning why Jennifer Walters' origin moved from the eighth episode of the series to the first.

When originally working on the series' scripts in the writers' room, the plot revolving around Walters' origin was in the fourth episode of the series. Gao wanted the series to start "in situ" so the audience could have a few episodes to get to know the character and her reluctance in her life after her accident, with the backstory in the fourth episode giving context to what was previously seen. However, as the series began production, this material was pushed to the eighth episode of the series, which was the result of "a lot of discussion". Finally, while in post-production, the Marvel Studios executives wanted to move Walters' origin to the first episode because they were finding from test screenings that the audience wanted to know more about the character sooner. Gao was resistant to this change because she had taken for granted that the average viewer would have been able to know and understand the character going into the series at a similar level as her. She ultimately was happy with the outcome, but wished she had been able to design the episode to accommodate the origin from the start.

Mark Ruffalo enjoyed seeing some of the "everyday life" of Banner since not much was known about the character "outside of fighting for the universe", with the episode able to "dig in" to it after exploring a little of it in Thor: Ragnarok (2017). He also felt the episode was "a good entry" into potentially exploring more of Banner's time during the Blip, when he went from someone who could not turn into the Hulk to a fully integrated version, believing there was "a standalone story to be told" in that time period. Conversations were also had with Feige and Marvel Studios about using Walters' DNA to help heal Banner's injured arm from the events of Avengers: Endgame (2019) and how that fit into the larger plans and narrative of the MCU.

Walters repeatedly asking Banner if Steve Rogers was a virgin was originally meant to be the beginning of a "season-long runner" that was "constantly gnawing away" at her. Episodes later in the season would have shown her regularly searching the internet for insight, as well as "constantly pestering people in her life" about it. Maslany loved that this was Walters' obsession because it allowed Walters to relate to the human side of Rogers. Gao was surprised at Feige being open to discussing and answering that question, and was "so happy and proud that we got to answer that question" since it had "been a discussion for years". The episode's mid-credits scene reveals the answer, with Banner stating that Rogers lost his virginity to a girl in 1943 while on the USO tour; this mid-credits was meant to be the final one for the season. Ruffalo felt exploring this was one part of the series' larger look at "all the human stuff" of the MCU. Steve Rogers actor Chris Evans had previously discussed the possibility of the character being a virgin or not in 2014, speculating that maybe one of the USO tour dance girls "blew his mind" during the events of Captain America: The First Avenger (2011), though he preferred to believe he was waiting for Peggy Carter.

=== Casting ===
The episode stars Tatiana Maslany as Jennifer Walters / She-Hulk, Jameela Jamil as Titania, Ginger Gonzaga as Nikki Ramos, and Mark Ruffalo as Bruce Banner / Smart Hulk. Also starring are Steve Coulter as Holden Holliway and Drew Matthews as Dennis Bukowski.

=== Filming and visual effects ===
Filming occurred at Trilith Studios in Atlanta, Georgia, with Coiro directing the episode, and Florian Ballhaus serving as cinematographer. Coiro said Ruffalo had to make an adjustment for his performance in the episode with the long sequences of dialogue, since he is used to having the Hulk "on the sidelines, or in an action sequence, or [with] only a couple pages of dialogue" in his past performances. Platforms had to be built on set for Ruffalo and Maslany to stand on in their motion-capture suits while performing the Hulk and She-Hulk scenes. Ruffalo, a climate activist, worked with Coiro and her support of the environmental nonprofit Habits of Waste and their "Lights, Camera, Plastic" campaign during filming, to alter the food seen in Hulk's pantry from junk food to healthier alternatives.

Visual effects for the episode were created by Wētā FX, Digital Domain, Wylie Co, Cantina Creative, Stereo D, Capital T, Keep Me Posted, and Lightstage.

=== Music ===
The following songs are featured in the episode: "Money On It" by Together Pangea, "Next Thing You Know" by Robin & The Rocks, "Asleep in the Clouds" by Wenda Williamson, "I Want To Be with You" by George Simms, "Fast (Motion)" by Saweetie, "Porro Bonito" by Orquesta Ritmo De Sabanas, "Cumbia Caletera" by Tito Nunez y su Orquesta, "Licked and Live on Ludlow" by Deep East Music, "Who's That Girl?" by Eve, and "Banaito Y Perfumao" by Fernando Cavazos.

== Marketing ==
A QR code was included in the episode that allowed viewers to access a free digital copy of She-Hulk's debut issue, Savage She-Hulk (1980) #1. After the episode's release, Marvel announced merchandise inspired by the episode as part of its weekly "Marvel Must Haves" promotion for each episode of the series, including a She-Hulk Marvel Legends figure, along with apparel, and accessories, and Funko Pops of Walters, Ramos, and Hulk.

== Reception ==
=== Viewership ===
According to market research company Parrot Analytics, which looks at consumer engagement in consumer research, streaming, downloads, and on social media, She-Hulk: Attorney at Law claimed the top spot in the weekly breakout shows ranking, which is defined as the most in-demand series that have premiered in the past 100 days, with a demand level of 25.1 times the average series from August 13–19, 2022. This marked a notable rise, overtaking The Sandman, which led the chart the previous week. Analytics company Samba TV, which gathers viewership data from certain smart TVs and content providers, reported that the premiere was watched by an estimated 1.5 million households in the United States in the first four days of release, which was up from the 775,000 households who watched the premiere of Ms. Marvel. The episode over-indexed with Gen-Z millennials, Black, and Hispanic households. JustWatch, a guide to streaming content with access to data from more than 20 million users around the world, estimated that She-Hulk: Attorney at Law was the second most-streamed series in the U.S. through August 21, 2022. The streaming aggregator Reelgood, which monitors real-time data from 5 million users in the U.S. for original and acquired streaming programs and movies across subscription video-on-demand (SVOD) and ad-supported video-on-demand (AVOD) services, reported that She-Hulk: Attorney at Law was the second most-streamed series in the U.S. through August 24, 2022.

=== Critical response ===
The review aggregator website Rotten Tomatoes reports an 87% approval rating with an average rating of 7.30/10, based on 136 reviews. The site's critical consensus reads, "The jury's still out on where the rest of the season will lead, but as an opening argument, this table-setting installment of She-Hulk is plenty of fun".

Amelia Emberwing at IGN gave the first episode an 8 out of 10, giving praise to Maslany and her "exceptional chemistry" with Ruffalo. Emberwing enjoyed that the episode gave "big answers" in regards to Banner and Smart Hulk in the MCU and that all the call outs to the wider MCU never felt "shoehorned". She believed as well that the episode's visual effects had improved after similar shots featured in the series' trailers were criticized. Finally, Emberwing stated that the episode "captures the female experience maybe even more than previous woman-fronted MCU entries... [being] the first series that feels unabashedly and contemporarily female". Collider's Arezou Amin gave "A Normal Amount of Rage" an "A–", saying the episode "brings a much-needed dose of levity to the Marvel TV landscape". Amin called the origin story "a refreshing, fast-paced upgrade" from what has been seen in the MCU previously and was surprised that it occurred so quickly. She called the episode's visual effects its "weak spot", though they were "far from the worst", and was frustrated that the series had to rely on digital faces to help convey emotions, but noted Maslany and Ruffalo were able to convey those through their vocal performances.

Caroline Framke of Variety, in her review for the first four episodes, called it "bold" to begin the series with an episode "that looks nothing like the ones to come afterward", but felt it was necessary to better understand Walters and how she was a contrast with Banner. Framke enjoyed Maslany and Ruffalo's chemistry and felt the visual effects were improved from the trailers. Regarding Hulk and She-Hulk fighting, Framke said Coriro "does her best to avoid Marvel's traditionally muddy battles by making this one feel more elastic". Writing for The A.V. Club, Jenna Scherer gave the episode a "B+", feeling Walters was "a little thinly written so far, [but] Maslany's charm makes us immediately fall in love with her". Scherer was not completely on board with the digital design, noting She-Hulk was big but does not look "particularly strong" compared to Hulk, adding "[e]ven a show explicitly about the ways women are denied power can't escape feminine body stereotypes". Kirsten Howard for Den of Geek gave the episode 2.5 out of 4, and said it was "a competent introduction to the character of Jennifer Walters", praising Maslany and called the visual effects "mostly fine" with a few moments that "look a bit dodgy".

Charles Pulliam-Moore, writing for The Verge, noted the "casual, almost passive sexism" demonstrated in the episode with Banner assuming Walters' Hulk experience would be similar to his, and how becoming a Hulk left Walters "with a unique way of understanding the world" with her ability to break the fourth wall. Pulliam-Moore believed the series "frames [this ability] as Jen's answer to Bruce's Hulk rage". Petrana Radulovic from Polygon felt the answer to Rogers' virginity was "lacking" given the MCU "is largely devoid of sex and romance" believing the joke felt "like it's making fun of fans who are invested in his romantic relationships". She continued that some fans would prefer "an emotional connection between characters, a history built up between them, tension and feelings and sparks" rather than have the MCU "continue to undermine most genuine relationships with snarky jokes and punctuate moments of emotional resonance with silly quips".
