= The Blip =

Event in the Marvel Cinematic Universe

Thanos initiating the Blip, as depicted in Avengers: Infinity War

The Blip (also known as the Decimation and the Snap) is a major fictional event depicted in the Marvel Cinematic Universe (MCU). The Blip begins in 2018 (Note: In-universe calendar) when Thanos, wielding all six Infinity Stones in the Infinity Gauntlet, exterminates half of all living things in the universe, chosen at random, with a snap of his fingers. The Blip ends five years later, on October 17, 2023, when the Avengers utilize time travel to collect the Infinity Stones from prior points in the timeline and, with a second snap by Avengers member Bruce Banner, restores all those previously killed by Thanos.

Aspects of the Blip have been featured in Phases Three, Four, and Five of the MCU, most notably in Avengers: Infinity War (2018), which is when the first snap occurred, and Avengers: Endgame (2019), where the second snap took place. In addition, a variety of other MCU films and television series have referenced or depicted aspects of the Blip. The consequences of the Blip were substantial and far-reaching. Some were portrayed for comic effects, such as "blipped" school band members reappearing in the middle of a basketball game and "blipped" characters now being years younger than their own "unblipped" previously younger siblings. Others were portrayed for dramatic effect, such as blipped characters returning to general chaos and confusion, finding that loved ones had died in their absence, their homes and life savings were repossessed, and their jobs had been filled by others.

The Blip inspired the creation of a real-world event on the website Reddit, in which a randomly selected half of the members of a highly popular subreddit would be banned, simulating the effects of the Blip. The ban of over 300,000 accounts, which included Infinity War and Endgame co-director Anthony Russo, was the largest in Reddit's history. The Blip, as an event within the MCU, has been compared to the COVID-19 pandemic as something that has a sustained effect on people all over the world. Since the Blip in Infinity War, many scientific articles have been published analyzing various aspects of the event, including whether it would even be possible for Thanos to snap his fingers while wearing the Infinity Gauntlet.

== Etymology ==
Following the release of Avengers: Infinity War (2018), the event was dubbed by fans as "the Snap", "the Snappening", or "the Snapture". In the tie-in novel Marvel's Avengers: Infinity War: The Cosmic Quest Volume Two: Aftermath by Brandon T. Snider, the event was referred to as "the Decimation", but this naming was not used in any other related media. The event was referred to as "the Blip" in Spider-Man: Far From Home (2019), but Kevin Feige later clarified that "the Snap" referred to Thanos's finger snap in Avengers: Infinity War while "the Blip" referred to Bruce Banner's finger snap in Avengers: Endgame (2019). Despite Feige's comments, both events were collectively referred to as "the Blip" in MCU projects such as WandaVision (2021), The Falcon and the Winter Soldier (2021), Hawkeye (2021), Spider-Man: No Way Home (2021), Ant-Man and the Wasp: Quantumania (2023), and The Marvels (2023), and the term also appears to reference the five-year gap between the two snaps during which half of the universe's population was wiped from existence, such as used in She-Hulk: Attorney at Law (2022). Secret Invasion (2023) uses both "the Blip" and "the Snap".

== Known victims and survivors ==
=== Victims ===
The Blip wiped out 50% of all living things. Memorials to the "vanished" victims were erected in communities across the universe. Among the victims were:

- Bucky Barnes
- Cooper Barton
- Laura Barton
- Lila Barton
- Nathaniel Barton
- Yelena Belova
- Betty Brant
- Paul Denning
- Drax
- Jane Foster
- Nick Fury
- Groot
- Maria Hill
- Jason Ionello
- Michelle Jones-Watson
- Ned Leeds
- Mantis
- Wanda Maximoff
- Wilfred Nagel
- May Parker
- Peter Parker
- Hank Pym
- Peter Quill
- Monica Rambeau
- Betty Ross
- Thaddeus Ross
- Erik Selvig
- Shuri
- Sif
- Stephen Strange
- T'Challa
- Flash Thompson
- Hope van Dyne
- Janet van Dyne
- Nicodemus West
- Sam Wilson

=== Survivors ===
Those known to have survived the Blip include:

- Bruce Banner
- Clint Barton
- Kate Bishop
- Sharon Carter (Note: Initially believed to be dead)
- Carol Danvers
- Brad Davis
- Wilson Fisk
- Goose
- Roger Harrington
- Tyler Hayward
- Happy Hogan
- Howard the Duck
- Korg
- Cassie Lang
- Scott Lang
- Maya Lopez
- William Lopez
- M'Baku
- Miek
- Karli Morgenthau
- Matt Murdock
- Nakia
- Nebula
- Okoye
- Christine Palmer
- Pepper Potts
- Maria Rambeau
- Ramonda
- James Rhodes
- Rocket
- Steve Rogers
- Natasha Romanoff
- Marc Spector
- Tony Stark
- Talos
- T'Challa II / Toussaint
- Thanos
- Thor
- Joaquin Torres
- Valkyrie
- Varra / Priscilla Fury
- Wong

Scott Lang is in the Quantum Realm at the time of the Blip, and although only five hours passed in the realm from his perspective before he escapes, because time passes differently there, five years have passed in the outside world. However, Lang is believed by others to have been a victim, due to his absence over those five years. The Eternals (Ajak, Druig, Gilgamesh, Ikaris, Kingo, Makkari, Phastos, Sersi, Sprite, and Thena) also survive the Blip because they were artificial, not biological, beings, and were therefore not subject to its effects.

== Depictions ==
=== Infinity Saga ===
Doctor Strange dusting after Thanos acquired all six Infinity Stones and snapped his fingers

In Avengers: Infinity War, Thanos obtains the six Infinity Stones and places them within a Gauntlet built by Eitri, so that he can snap his fingers and eliminate half of all life in the universe, which he believes will bring a balance that will prevent greater catastrophes from fighting over resources. The Blip occurs at the end of the film in Wakanda, where numerous characters are blipped, including Bucky Barnes, Nick Fury, Maria Hill, Wanda Maximoff, Peter Parker, Stephen Strange, T'Challa, Sam Wilson, Peter Quill, Groot, Drax, and Mantis. The Russo brothers also revealed that, despite not appearing in Infinity War, Betty Ross and Sif were blipped as well. The Blip is shown by characters slowly turning into dust and disappearing. Despite his initiation of the Blip, Thanos himself possessed no immunity to the event; he also was subject to the 50/50 odds of potential disappearance, though ended up in the surviving half of the population.

In a mid-credits scene in Ant-Man and the Wasp (2018), Hank Pym, Hope van Dyne, and Janet van Dyne are blipped, leaving Scott Lang stranded in the Quantum Realm. In a subsequent post-credits scene, a nationwide broadcast of the Emergency Alert System is shown on a television in Lang's house.

In a post-credits scene of Captain Marvel (2019), the Avengers are surveying reports of worldwide population losses at the Avengers Compound, when Carol Danvers abruptly appears, having received a distress signal from Fury that he sent through a pager before he blipped.

When asked how the sixth season of Agents of S.H.I.E.L.D., set one year after the events of the fifth season and Infinity War, would connect to the then-upcoming Avengers: Endgame, Marvel Television head Jeph Loeb suggested in March 2019 that the one-year time jump between the previous season of the series and this one was part of the series's tie-in to that film. After Endgame was released in April, the showrunners and Loeb revealed that the series would not directly depict or reference the Blip for several reasons. They began production on the season without knowing all of Endgame's plot or how Far From Home would be depicting a post-Endgame MCU. They were also unsure when the season would be released in relation to Endgame and how much they would be allowed to reveal if they had begun airing before the film was released. They wanted to focus on telling their own story rather than be "shackled too much to the universe-changing events from the films". While acknowledging that this meant the series seemingly no longer lined up with the films' timeline, producer Jed Whedon stated that the writers had an explanation for this that made sense to them even though they did not plan to "burden the audience" with it. A line referencing the Blip and how the Quantum Realm could be used to avoid it was filmed for the series finale but was ultimately cut from the aired episode.

In Avengers: Endgame, Clint Barton's family, Erik Selvig, Shuri, and Jane Foster are confirmed to have been blipped. In the Avengers Compound, Sharon Carter and Scott Lang are also listed as blipped, though Carter went rogue to establish her identity as the Power Broker in Madripoor and Lang was unaccounted for due to being trapped in the Quantum Realm. Some of the surviving heroes travel to the planet where Thanos has gone to attempt to recover the Infinity Stones and undo the Blip, only to learn that Thanos had destroyed the Stones to ensure that his work could not be undone. Five years later, the effects of the disappearances are explored, with many characters having experiences resulting from the event. For example, Barton is distraught at the loss of his family and takes on a new identity as Ronin, travelling the world to massacre organized crime figures involved in the drug trade and child trafficking. Rogers leads a support group in New York City for those dealing with the loss of loved ones in the Blip. Thor, who blames himself for failing to kill Thanos before the initial snap, becomes an out-of-shape alcoholic. Urban decay is apparent in cities such as New York City and San Francisco. Danvers tells the Avengers that the chaos happening on Earth is also occurring on other planets.

In the meantime, Scott Lang is freed from the Quantum Realm, having only experienced five hours instead of years. He comes across a memorial park listing names of the vanished, including himself, then reunites with his daughter Cassie, who had been a young girl when he last saw her and is now a teenager. Lang informs the remaining Avengers and allies about his discovery: the Quantum Realm can allow time travel. While they soon determine that the nature of time travel means that they cannot simply go back in time and stop Thanos from either causing the Blip or destroying the Stones in the first place, they are able to use Pym Particles to travel through the Quantum Realm to retrieve the Infinity Stones from alternate timelines in the past. Upon returning to the present, Tony Stark, Bruce Banner, and Rocket develop a Gauntlet composed of Stark's nanotech that is capable of harnessing the power of the Stones. Due to the powerful emission of gamma radiation resulting from the Stones' use, Banner volunteers to wear the Gauntlet and successfully restores the blipped victims in the condition they had vanished. The Avengers are then attacked by an alternate version of Thanos who intends to destroy and recreate the universe. A final battle ensues and Stark ultimately wins the battle by using the Stones to destroy Thanos and his army, at the cost of his own life. Following a funeral honoring Stark's sacrifice, Rogers travels back in time to return the Stones to their original time periods.

In Spider-Man: Far From Home, the Blip is discussed in a school news broadcast at the beginning of the film, which is the first instance in any medium of the name. The broadcast shows Midtown School of Science and Technology band members reappearing in the middle of a basketball game. The film reveals that several more characters had been blipped and restored, including Peter's aunt May Parker and his classmates Ned Leeds, MJ, Betty Brant, and Flash Thompson. Parker's teacher Roger Harrington complains that his wife had pretended to have been blipped in order to leave him. As part of a viral marketing campaign to promote the home media release of Far From Home, a real version of the fictional TheDailyBugle.net website was created that featured testimonials from supposed victims of the Blip, including one complaining that they disappeared in a dangerous situation and were seriously injured when they reappeared. This contradicted a statement by Feige saying that anyone in such a situation would have reappeared safely. Several days after this was pointed out, the website was updated to say this story was faked for an insurance claim.

=== Multiverse Saga ===
==== Phase Four ====
At the beginning of the fourth episode of WandaVision, "We Interrupt This Program", Monica Rambeau is shown returning from being blipped in a hospital room, discovering chaos in the hallways as other people are un-blipped causing the hospital to be overcrowded, and learning that her mother, Maria Rambeau, had died while she was gone. In the same episode, when characters outside the Westview hex first see Vision onscreen, three weeks after everyone returned, Darcy Lewis asks Jimmy Woo and other colleagues to confirm that "he's dead, right? Not blipped. Dead". In a flashback in the eighth episode, "Previously On", Wanda Maximoff goes to the S.W.O.R.D. headquarters in Florida and tells them that after "she came back", Vision's body was gone. The large screen televisions in the headquarters show the news that the Blip happened and that people around the world are being reunited with their loved ones. The writers and producers had many conversations about how to portray people returning from the Blip, and decided to set the sequence in a hospital as an interesting place to depict the scariness and confusion of the event from Monica's perspective. This is different from the portrayal of the Blip in Far From Home, which had a more comedic tone, and Schaeffer explained that Marvel was happy for the series' tone to be different as long as the visuals of the sequence matched with those seen in Far From Home.

In The Falcon and the Winter Soldier, set six months after Endgame, the Blip is referenced as having created chaos around the world. Millions of people who were displaced by the Blip came under the authority of the Global Repatriation Council, with a substantial number of people living as refugees awaiting repatriation to their home countries. The event caused violent revolutions throughout the world by organizations such as the Flag Smashers, who felt that life was better during the Blip and engage in terrorist activities to promote an anarchist society. Joaquin Torres tells Sam Wilson that life was not easy during the five year period of the Blip. A couple thanks Wilson for helping restore their family, unaware that Wilson had been blipped also. Wilson apologizes to Sharon Carter for not getting in touch with her after he was restored to life. The Smithsonian's Captain America exhibit displayed screens relating to the Blip and the events of Infinity War and Endgame. One screen was titled the "Vanished" with a long list of names of people who disappeared. Another screen was titled "The Blip". On Sharon Carter surviving the Blip and becoming the Power Broker, series director Kari Skogland said that Carter "had to survive out there on her own during the Blip and being on the run without family—and look at what she built and where she went. She's clever, and that's what I love about it most."

The Blip is not shown to occur in the alternate universes depicted in episodes of the animated series What If...?'s first season. In the second episode, T'Challa convinces Thanos to abandon his plans of erasing half of life in the universe, while in the fifth episode Thanos arrives on Earth, having acquired five of the Infinity Stones, but is infected by the quantum virus and transformed into a zombie before he can acquire the final Stone. In the eighth episode, Thanos arrives on Earth to retrieve the Mind Stone after collecting the other Infinity Stones but is swiftly killed by Ultron, who takes the Stones for himself and sets about to annihilate all life in the multiverse.

In Shang-Chi and the Legend of the Ten Rings (2021), the Blip is discussed, and fliers can be seen in San Francisco regarding a hotline for sufferers of "post-Blip anxiety". In Eternals (2021), Ajak reveals that the Blip delayed the onslaught of the Emergence for five years, as it halved the Earth's population from the necessary level needed for it to occur. An advertisement for the Global Repatriation Council is also featured in the film. In Hawkeye, set in December 2024, the phrase "Thanos was right" is seen on a coffee mug and in graffiti throughout New York City, such as in the men's bathroom of a Broadway theater. The Blip is mentioned by Kate Bishop when she deduces that Clint Barton was the Ronin. It is also shown that Yelena Belova was blipped and that Maya Lopez and her father, William, survived the Blip, only for William to later die in an attack facilitated by his employer, Wilson Fisk, who also survived the Blip. The series's fifth episode, "Ronin", was the first MCU media to show the Blip from the perspective of a person being blipped, with Belova seeming to almost instantly disintegrate and then reappear, with the room around her changing in appearance to signify the passage of five years.

In Spider-Man: No Way Home (2021), it is revealed that Wong replaced Stephen Strange as the Sorcerer Supreme due to Strange's disappearance during the Blip. In a mid-credits scene, a bartender explains to a universe-displaced Eddie Brock how his family was among the victims of the Blip. Although the Blip is never mentioned in Moon Knight (2022), the issue date on Marc Spector's passport is visibly shown to be December 14, 2018, which is a post-Blip date, indicating that he survived. In addition, a Global Repatriation Council banner is seen on the side of a bus in the second episode. In Doctor Strange in the Multiverse of Madness (2022), it is revealed that Strange's former girlfriend Dr. Christine Palmer survived the Blip and, during that time, found love with another man, Charlie, whom she marries. During the wedding, Strange also learns that his former co-worker Dr. Nicodemus West was blipped, and when he returned five years later, he was devastated to discover that his brother and cats had died during his absence. This compels West to ask Strange if there was any way that Thanos could have been defeated without the Blip occurring, prompting Strange to confirm that there was no other way.

In the first episode of Ms. Marvel (2022), a memorial wall at the first AvengerCon showcased various notes from people thanking the Avengers for their role in bringing back family members, including pictures of families reunited. In the first episode of She-Hulk: Attorney at Law, Bruce Banner takes his cousin Jennifer Walters to his beach house/lab in Mexico that was built by Banner and Stark and explains to Walters that it's where he spent the five year period of the Blip, fixing himself and merging the Hulk/Banner personas. In the second episode, Walters's mother, Elaine, reminds the family that Banner was responsible for the undoing of the Blip and that he had saved everyone with a snap of his finger. In Black Panther: Wakanda Forever (2022), it is revealed that Nakia and her son Toussaint left Wakanda immediately following the Blip, and Ramonda served as queen regnant of Wakanda during the subsequent five years.

==== Phase Five ====
In Ant-Man and the Wasp: Quantumania (2023), it is revealed that Hope van Dyne founded the Pym van Dyne Foundation to help the world using Pym Particles in the aftermath of the Blip, by providing reforestation and other humanitarian efforts. Cassie Lang also tried to assist with activism in helping a settlement of people who had lost their homes due to displacement following the Blip. Scott Lang also reminds the Pym family that they would have remained blipped had he not returned from the Quantum Realm. In Guardians of the Galaxy Vol. 3 (2023), Quill admits that he was partially responsible for half of the universe getting destroyed recalling the events of Infinity War and how he got angry after learning about Gamora's death. In Secret Invasion (2023), Fury suffers from post-traumatic stress due to his Blip-caused disintegration, leaving him more vulnerable. It is revealed that S.A.B.E.R. was made in the aftermath of Infinity War to protect Earth from other extraterrestrial threats. Fury learns that Talos, having survived the Blip, secretly brought a million refugee Skrulls to Earth while the blipped population was gone. In The Marvels (2023), Monica Rambeau reveals to Kamala Khan and Carol Danvers that after she returned from being blipped she was alone. In a flashback, Danvers acknowledges to Monica's mother, Maria, that Monica blipped. This flashback happened during the five-year period in between the events of Endgame and was the first time the word was used in the timeline. It is also revealed that Goose survived the Blip.

== Differences from the comics ==
Thanos initiating the Snap as depicted in The Infinity Gauntlet series

In the comic books published by Marvel Comics, the event on which the initial part of the Blip is based occurred during the 1991 The Infinity Gauntlet series and came to be called the Snap. While still carried out by Thanos, it was done in an effort to impress the female personification of Death, with whom he was enamored. Thanos collects the Infinity Gems—which he uses to create the Infinity Gauntlet, making himself omnipotent—and erases half the living things in the universe to prove his love to Death. The heroes of Earth and other worlds do not become aware of these events until the Snap itself occurs, after which the surviving heroes band together against Thanos. The Snap and several related acts are quickly undone by Nebula and Adam Warlock. Warlock reveals that Thanos has always allowed himself to be defeated because the Titan secretly knows he is not worthy of ultimate power. Thanos then joins Warlock as part of the Infinity Watch and helps him to defeat various threats to the universe. As the Snap is reversed shortly after it occurs, it does not have the sort of long-term societal effects and repercussions as the Blip in the MCU. Instead the members of the Infinity Watch are each given one of the Gems, which included giving Thanos the Reality Gem. Furthermore, because the Infinity Gems are recovered from Thanos immediately and are never destroyed, they continue to play a role in later storylines in the comic books.

== Design and special effects ==
Weta Digital was in charge of creating the design of the dusting effect. One of the main instructions from the Russo brothers early on was that the effect had to look final, so that there was no doubt the characters were gone. The Russos also told Weta that they wanted the effect to look "painful with a component that was quite violent". They specifically did not want it to be "too gentle or lyrical". Weta started out with a series of 2D concept frames, in which two were chosen to be combined into a full CG simulation test. The team chose to use Drax as the test character due to his lack of hair, as they wanted to get the effect design further along before dealing with hair. A highly detailed digital double was created and used as a canvas for Drax dusting. To apply the dusting effect to the other characters, complex growth algorithms were developed to apply the effect in "an organic way".

Early on in the process, Digital Domain considered having "snap" briefly pop up on screen when Thanos snapped his fingers as a reference to how the snap occurred in the Infinity Gauntlet comic. Domain's VFX Supervisor Kelly Port said "as a fun aside, we explored the idea of lifting the actual graphic from the frame of the comic showing the snap, the little yellow action triangles for a single frame of the moment of the snap. They appreciated the idea but didn't ultimately go for it." Special effects supervisor Dan DeLeeuw said that many tests were done to make sure that dust scattered the correct way. The VFX team paid close attention to what each Stone did and originally incorporated all of them into the dusting effect, although DeLeeuw admits that the look was too mesmerizing, saying "we realized it had to become about less being more". The team then decided to make the Blip caused by the Power Stone specifically, as the characters' corporeal forms were left behind as they were being erased from the universe. The final version became more about depicting each character disappearing and less about the effect of the Stones.

== Reception and popular culture ==
The introduction of the Blip drew positive reviews from critics and audiences as an effective plot device due to its use as a plot twist in Infinity War, serious tone, and overarching implications in the MCU. Marvel Studios president Kevin Feige viewed the inclusion of the Blip as a major crux in the MCU timeline, similar to how the Battle of New York in the third act of The Avengers (2012) would go on to be referenced as a pivotal event in multiple MCU media. The depiction of the Blip at the conclusion of Avengers: Infinity War sparked various Internet meme reactions, including one referencing Peter Parker saying he does not feel good as he disintegrates, which was applied to other things.

The website, DidThanosKill.Me was created for fans to see if they would have been spared by Thanos or not, telling them either "You were spared by Thanos" or "You were slain by Thanos" as a result of random chance. The ending of Infinity War also spawned the creation of the Reddit subreddit r/thanosdidnothingwrong. A user within the subreddit suggested that half of the approximately 20,000 subscribers at the time be banned from the subreddit, in order to mimic the events of the film. After the community agreed to the measure, the moderators approached Reddit's administrators to see if the mass ban would even be possible. Once the administrators agreed to the random ban of half the subscribers, it was set to occur on July 9, 2018. Notice of the impending ban made the subreddit's subscribers increase to over 700,000, including both of the Russos who subscribed. Ahead of the ban, Brolin posted a video saying "Here we go, Reddit users," and ending it with a snap. Over 60,000 people watched a live Twitch stream of the ban occurring, which lasted several hours. The ban of over 300,000 accounts, which included Anthony Russo's, was the largest in Reddit's history. Those banned then gathered in the new subreddit, /r/inthesoulstone. One Reddit user who participated described the ban as embodying "the spirit of the Internet" with people "banding together, en masse, around something relatively meaningless but somehow decidedly awesome and hilarious". Andrew Tigani of Screen Rant said this showed "how impactful the film has already become to pop culture. It is also a testament to how valuable fan interaction can be via social media".

Following the premiere of Endgame, Google included a clickable icon of the Infinity Gauntlet in Google Search results for "Thanos" or "Infinity Gauntlet" as a digital Easter egg. The icon, when clicked, made a finger-snapping motion before half of the search results disappeared, akin to the disappearance of characters following the Blip. The disappearance of the search results could also be reversed, shown by the use of the Time Stone in the Infinity Gauntlet icon. Feige has noted the similar connotations and societal ramifications between the fictional Blip and the real-life COVID-19 pandemic, which began several months after the release of Endgame. Feige elaborated, "As we started getting into a global pandemic last March and April and May, we started to go, holy mackerel, the Blip, this universal experience...this experience that affected every human on Earth, now has a direct parallel between what people who live in the MCU had encountered, and what all of us in the real world have encountered." In late 2020, Funko released a Funko Pop of Nick Fury in the middle of being dusted. In March 2021, to congratulate James Cameron on Avatar (2009) regaining the title as the highest-grossing film of all time at the worldwide box office over Endgame, the Russo brothers shared an image with Thanos's armor scarecrow and the Avengers' logo dusting away into the Avatar logo.

=== Scientific analysis and accuracy ===
The motivations held by Thanos that led to the Blip have drawn comparisons by experts to claims and works held by 18th-century scholar and economist Thomas Malthus. In 1798, Malthus theorized in An Essay on the Principle of Population, that if populations grew much faster than their food sources, and if growth remained unchecked, it would eventually lead to societal collapse. Malthus had argued that society could impose a preventative check on unrestrained growth, thereby avoiding catastrophic outcomes.

While the event wipes out half of the universe's population and not necessarily half of Earth's, modern scientific experts have commented that, in a hypothetical real-world scenario, a reduction of half of all forms of biological life on Earth would have immediate effects on biodiversity, comparable to a mass extinction event. Threatened species with preexisting low populations, as well as those species involved in pollination and food production services that require pollination management would be adversely affected. Ecosystem collapse could be possible. In relation to humans, a decrease of human overpopulation would lead to fewer emissions of greenhouse gases, which would improve the prospects of climate change mitigation and reduce global warming and its related effects. Humans would lose approximately between 1 pound (0.45 kg) and 3 pounds (1.4 kg), due to the loss of microbes and bacteria in the body. A simultaneous mass disappearance of people would also immediately trigger a substantial number of accidental and circumstantial deaths, such as airplane crashes and vehicular accidents.

== See also ==
- Malthusianism
- The Population Bomb, a 1968 book by Paul R. Ehrlich that predicted worldwide famine due to overpopulation, as well as other major societal upheavals
- The World Without Us, a 2007 book by Alan Weisman proposing what would happen to the Earth if all of humanity suddenly disappeared from it
