= Bruce Banner (Marvel Cinematic Universe) =

Character in the Marvel Cinematic Universe

- Marvel Cinematic Universe character
- Bruce Banner / Hulk as portrayed by Edward Norton (left) in The Incredible Hulk and portrayed by Mark Ruffalo (right) in The Avengers (2012)
- First appearance: The Incredible Hulk (2008)
- Based on: Hulk by: Stan Lee; Jack Kirby
- Adapted by: Zak Penn
- Portrayed by: Edward Norton (2008); Mark Ruffalo (2012–present)
- Voiced by: Lou Ferrigno (2008–2015); Mark Ruffalo (2012–present)

In-universe information
- Aliases: Hulk; Mr. Green; Smart Hulk
- Species: Human mutate
- Title: Champion of Sakaar
- Occupation: Avenger; Gladiator; Biochemist; Nuclear physicist; Professor; Consultant for S.H.I.E.L.D.
- Affiliation: Avengers; Culver University; Revengers; S.H.I.E.L.D.; Empire State University
- Family: Jennifer Walters (cousin); Elaine Walters (aunt); Morris Walters (uncle); Brian Banner (father); Rebecca Banner (mother)
- Significant others: Betty Ross (Note: As depicted in The Incredible Hulk.); Natasha Romanoff (Note: As depicted in Avengers: Age of Ultron (2015).); Unnamed woman (mother of Skaar) (Note: As depicted in the She-Hulk: Attorney at Law episode "Whose Show Is This?" (2022).)
- Children: Skaar
- Nationality: American

Bruce Banner, more commonly known by his alter ego the Hulk, is a fictional character in the Marvel Cinematic Universe (MCU) media franchise originally portrayed by Edward Norton and subsequently by Mark Ruffalo—based on the Marvel Comics character of the same name. Banner is depicted as a genius physicist who, after a failed experiment to replicate a super soldier program using gamma radiation, metamorphoses into a large, muscular humanoid creature with green skin whenever his heart rate goes above 200 beats per minute, he is angered, or when facing mortal danger. As the Hulk, he possesses superhuman abilities, including increased strength and durability.

Over time, Banner demonstrates an increasing ability to control the transformation and becomes a founding member of the Avengers. Following a conflict with Ultron, Banner is transported to Sakaar, where he remains as the Hulk for several years. After reuniting with Thor, he eventually returns to Earth during the conflict against Thanos. In the years following the Blip, Banner learns to retain the Hulk form with his mind still intact. He assists the Avengers in time travelling to obtain the Infinity Stones from the past to undo Thanos' actions. Banner uses the Stones in a specially-made Nano Gauntlet to restore the lives lost, before participating in a final and victorious battle against Thanos. He later trains his cousin Jennifer Walters who is accidentally imbued with his blood before departing again to Sakaar and meeting his son, Skaar. Banner becomes a professor of quantum mechanics and meets Peter Parker, until he's controlled by the mutant named Jean Grey, and caused him to transform back into an uncontrollable Hulk.

Banner has become a central character within the MCU, having appeared in ten films as of 2026, as well as the Disney+ streaming series She-Hulk: Attorney at Law. The character was introduced in the titular film The Incredible Hulk (2008), portrayed by Edward Norton before being recast to Mark Ruffalo. The character has been generally well-received by critics and audiences alike, but his inconsistent characterization has received some criticism. Additionally, Ruffalo voices several alternate versions of Banner in the animated series What If...?.

== Fictional character biography ==
=== Origin ===
Bruce Banner is a renowned scientist, physicist, and medical doctor with seven PhDs. While working at Culver University, Virginia, Banner meets with General Thaddeus Ross, the father of his colleague and girlfriend Betty, regarding an experiment that Ross claims is meant to make humans immune to gamma radiation, a field in which Banner is an expert. The experiment, part of the World War II-era supersoldier program that Ross hopes to recreate, fails, and the exposure to the gamma radiation causes Banner to transform into the Hulk for the first time. The Hulk goes on a rampage, destroying the lab, killing three people and injuring several others. Banner subsequently becomes a fugitive from the U.S. military, particularly Ross, who wants to weaponize the Hulk process.

=== Fugitive ===
Five years later in 2010, (Note: According to Leterrier, the film takes place about five years after Banner's first transformation. The events of the film also simultaneously take place with the events of Iron Man 2 (2010) and Thor (2011), set six months after the events of Iron Man (2008).) Banner works at a soda bottling factory in Rocinha, Rio de Janeiro while searching for a cure for his condition, collaborating on the internet with a colleague he knows only as "Mr. Blue", and to whom he is "Mr. Green". He also learns yoga techniques to help keep The Hulk under control and has not transformed in five months. After Banner cuts his finger, a drop of his blood falls into a bottle, and is eventually ingested by an elderly consumer in Milwaukee, Wisconsin, giving him gamma sickness. Ross tracks down Banner, sending a special forces team led by Russian-born British Royal Marine Emil Blonsky to capture him. Banner transforms into the Hulk and defeats Blonsky's team. Blonsky agrees to be injected with a similar serum, which gives him enhanced speed, strength, agility, and healing, but also begins to deform his skeleton and impair his judgment.

Banner returns to Culver University and reunites with Betty, but is attacked a second time by Ross and Blonsky's forces, again transforming into the Hulk. The Hulk seemingly kills Blonsky and flees with Betty. After the Hulk reverts to Banner, he and Betty go on the run, and Banner contacts Mr. Blue, who urges them to meet him in New York City. Mr. Blue, revealed to be cellular biologist Dr. Samuel Sterns, has developed a possible antidote to Banner's condition. After a successful test, he warns Banner that the antidote may only reverse each individual transformation. Sterns reveals he has synthesized Banner's blood samples, which Banner sent from Brazil, into a large supply, with the intention of applying its "limitless potential" to medicine. Fearful of the Hulk's power falling into the military's hands, Banner wishes to destroy the blood supply. Banner is caught, and Blonsky has Sterns use Banner's blood to turn him into the Abomination. Blonsky then rampages through Harlem. Realizing that only the Hulk can stop Blonsky, Banner jumps from Ross' helicopter and transforms after hitting the ground. After a long and brutal battle through Harlem, the Hulk defeats Blonsky and flees. Banner soon ends his relationship with Betty, realizing it can no longer work. A month later, in Bella Coola, British Columbia, Banner successfully transforms in a controlled manner.

=== Member of the Avengers ===
In 2012, Banner, who changed his appearance, is working as a doctor in Calcutta when he is approached by S.H.I.E.L.D. agent Natasha Romanoff, who recruits him to help trace the Tesseract through its gamma radiation emissions. Going with Romanoff, Banner is introduced to Steve Rogers and S.H.I.E.L.D. director Nick Fury. He is on the Quinjet when Loki is captured by Tony Stark and Rogers. After Loki's brother Thor agrees to place Loki in a cell on S.H.I.E.L.D.'s Helicarrier, agents including Clint Barton mind-controlled by Loki attack the Helicarrier, causing Banner to transform into the Hulk and almost kill Romanoff. Thor attempts to stop the Hulk's rampage, with Hulk falling to the ground after attacking a S.H.I.E.L.D. fighter jet. In New York City, Banner meets up with Rogers, Stark, Thor, Romanoff, and Barton, becoming a founding member of the Avengers. After the alien species of the Chitauri invade, Banner reveals to Rogers that he is "always angry", immediately transforming into the Hulk and stopping a Leviathan. During the battle, he fights the Chitauri, beats Loki into submission in Stark Tower, and saves Stark from crashing into the ground after losing power through the wormhole.

After the Battle of New York, Banner forms a close friendship with Stark and works with him closely, even requesting him to build an anti-Hulk armor to stop him in case he loses control and goes on a rampage. In 2013, Stark shared stories of his experience with the Extremis formula with Banner while they are relaxing in the Tower, seeking advice. Banner falls asleep during it, stating that he was not "that kind of doctor".

In 2015, Banner and the Avengers raid a Hydra facility in Sokovia and retrieve the scepter. At the Avengers Tower, Stark and Banner discover an artificial intelligence within the scepter's gem, and secretly decide to use it to complete Stark's "Ultron" global defense program. After a celebratory party, Ultron becomes sentient and attacks Banner and the Avengers at the Tower, before escaping. In Johannesburg, Banner and the Avengers try to stop Ultron, but are subdued by Wanda Maximoff who uses haunting visions to cause the Hulk to rampage in the city until Stark stops him with his Hulkbuster armor. Banner and the Avengers travel to Barton's home to recover, where Romanoff and Banner develop a mutual attraction. While there, Fury arrives and persuades the Avengers to make a plan to stop Ultron, resulting in Romanoff being captured and taken to Sokovia. Back at the Avengers Tower, Banner and the others have a confrontation after they learn about the creation of the Vision, but after Thor powers him, they learn Vision is an ally. Banner leaves the team to rescue Romanoff and transforms into the Hulk in order to fight Ultron. After the final battle with Ultron in Sokovia, the Hulk departs in a Quinjet and leaves Earth.

=== Sakaar and Ragnarok ===
After Hulk is lost in space, the Quinjet crash lands on the landfill planet Sakaar. He is taken in by the Grandmaster of Sakaar, who forces him to fight against other contestants in gladiatorial combat. He rises the ranks, remaining undefeated and winning the admiration of the people of Sakaar, and becoming the Grandmaster's "Champion".

In 2017, Hulk fights the next contestant, Thor, who had crashed on the planet and had been captured by Valkyrie. Summoning lightning, Thor gains the upper hand on Hulk, but the Grandmaster sabotages the fight to ensure Hulk's victory. Still enslaved, Thor attempts to convince Hulk to help him save Asgard from Ragnarok, and then escapes the palace to find the crashed remains of the Quinjet. Hulk follows Thor to the Quinjet, where a recording of Romanoff makes him transform back into Banner for the first time in two years while Hulk’s tries to resist. Banner is shocked to learn that he is in space and expresses fear that if he becomes Hulk again, he will never be able to return to his human form. Banner and Thor work with Valkyrie and Loki to escape Sakaar to Asgard, where Banner becomes Hulk again to save refugee Asgardians from the giant wolf, Fenris. As Asgard is destroyed by Surtur, Hulk accompanies Thor, Valkyrie, Loki, and the Asgardians on the Statesman, a Sakaaran vessel bound for Earth.

=== Infinity War ===
In 2018, Thanos and the Children of Thanos intercept the Statesman to extract the Space Stone from the Tesseract. Hulk fights Thanos, but is overpowered. Heimdall uses the Bifröst Bridge to send Hulk straight to Earth, and Hulk crash-lands at the New York Sanctum of Stephen Strange and Wong in New York City, reverting to Banner. Banner then warns Strange about Thanos, who contacts Stark. When Ebony Maw and Cull Obsidian arrive in New York in pursuit of the Time Stone, Banner tries to become the Hulk, but is unable to do so; Hulk is no longer willing to emerge from fear. He goes to the Avengers Compound for the first time reuniting with James Rhodes and later with Rogers, Romanoff, Sam Wilson, Maximoff, and Vision. He joins the team to Wakanda on their Quinjet, where he uses Stark's Hulkbuster armor to battle the Outriders and manages to get the upper hand on Obsidian. He is pleased when Thor, Rocket Raccoon, and Groot arrive to help. In the forest, he witnesses Thanos's arrival, and is promptly trapped in rocks by Thanos and unable to fight back. After Thanos activates the Infinity Gauntlet and teleports away, Banner is a survivor of the Blip.

Banner, the surviving Avengers, and Rocket return to the Compound and are shortly met by Carol Danvers. (Note: As depicted in the mid-credit scene of Captain Marvel (2019).) Afterwards, Banner, Rogers, Romanoff, Rhodes, Rocket, and Potts witness Danvers returning Stark and Nebula back to the Compound. Banner reunites with him, helping him get sedated and rest. He then accompanies the surviving Avengers, Danvers, Rocket, and Nebula back into space to the planet Titan II to confront Thanos only to find out he destroyed the Infinity Stones. (Note: As depicted in Avengers: Endgame (2019).)

=== Smart Hulk form ===
==== Time Heist and reversing the Blip ====
Bruce Banner / Hulk, colloquially dubbed "Smart Hulk" or "Professor Hulk", as portrayed by Mark Ruffalo via motion capture in Avengers: Endgame

In between 2018 and 2023, Banner undergoes gamma experimentation to balance his two sides in a remote beach house lab located in Mexico built by Stark. (Note: As mentioned in the first episode, "A Normal Amount of Rage", of She-Hulk: Attorney at Law (2022).) By 2023, he is now permanently in the body of the Hulk but with the mind and voice of Banner. He meets Rogers, Romanoff, and Scott Lang at a diner and agrees to help them with their quantum time-travel plan. At the Avengers Compound, they try to time-travel Lang using the quantum tunnel in Lang's borrowed van but are unsuccessful. After Stark arrives and offers his help, Banner and Rocket travel to Norway in the Benatar to New Asgard. Banner reunites with Valkyrie and meets Korg and Miek at Thor's hut, while recruiting a depressed drunken Thor to return to help the Avengers. Back at the Compound, the Avengers formulate a plan to retrieve alternate Infinity Stones. Banner, Rogers, Stark, and Lang time-travel via the Quantum Realm to an alternate 2012 in New York City. There Banner gets the Time Stone from an alternate variant of the Ancient One (to whom he promises to return the Stones to their respective periods in time when the Avengers are done with their mission).

Banner then returns to the main timeline, but is devastated to learn of Romanoff's death, who had to sacrifice herself to retrieve the Soul Stone. After mourning her with the original Avengers, Banner, Stark, and Rocket combine the Stones with the Nano-Gauntlet. Banner then volunteers to activate the Infinity Stones, citing his general strength and his specific resistance to gamma radiation. He does so and reverses the Blip, though his right arm gets seriously injured in the process. After doing so, an alternate version of Nebula emerges from the quantum realm and bombs the Compound, causing Banner, Rocket, and Rhodes to be trapped in rubble, until they are saved by Lang. He then takes part in the final battle against alternate Thanos and his alien army, who are eventually defeated when Stark uses the Infinity Stones, at the cost of his own life. A week later, Banner attends Stark's funeral, and then prepares a new quantum portal so that Rogers can return the alternate Infinity Stones and Mjolnir. He, Bucky Barnes, and Wilson witness an elderly Rogers return and give a new version of the shield to Wilson.

==== Meeting Shang-Chi ====
By 2024, Banner creates a device to heal his arm, keeping him in human form, and wears a sling due to the injury he sustained while reversing the Blip, though the scarring has healed. That year, Banner, along with Danvers, is called by Wong via hologram to speak with Shang-Chi about the ten rings that belonged to his father. Banner welcomes Shang-Chi to the team before leaving the call.

==== Training Jennifer Walters and meeting his son ====
Banner and his cousin, lawyer Jennifer Walters, go on a road trip in California but are intercepted by a Sakaaran eight-courier craft ship, causing Walters to crash the car. Banner bleeds, and his blood is accidentally cross-contaminated with Walters', resulting in Walters transforming into a Hulk and running away; Banner eventually retrieves her and uses the lethal gamma dose she took to completely heal his arm. In Mexico, Banner trains Walters on controlling her Hulk form, however she rejects the idea of being a superhero and wants to return to her legal career. The pair get into a fight and Banner eventually accepts Walters wanting to leave and bids her farewell.

In 2025, Banner takes off in the Sakaaran spaceship to investigate the message from the car crash and return to Sakaar; while there, he receives a call from Walters and encourages her to take on the case of representing Blonsky, as they have made amends. Banner also indicates approval of Walters' new superhero name "She-Hulk", given to her by the media, saying that "She-Hulk, attorney-at-law" has a nice ring to it.

Later, Banner returns to Earth with his son, Skaar. They crash a family gathering in Los Angeles where he introduces Skaar to Walters, her parents, their cousin, aunts and uncles, and Matt Murdock.

==== Meeting Peter Parker and return of Savage Hulk ====
By 2028, Banner has become a professor of quantum mechanics at Empire State University in New York City. One day, Peter Parker, hoping to control his mutating arachnid DNA, visits Banner after a class to ask about the inhibitor device that suppresses the Hulk. Based on Banner's advice, Parker fashions his own inhibitor to limit his powers, and starts work on a second to suppress the abilities of Jean Grey, a telepath who has been possessing people and using them to attack Department of Damage Control (DODC) facilities. When Jean next attacks the DODC, this time in person, she possesses Banner in his Smart Hulk form and forces him to carry out the attack with her. Parker, with the aid of Frank Castle, fights him until Jean switches to control Castle, thereby freeing Banner, who reverts back to human form, from her control. However, his inhibitor has been smashed, and despite Parker's best efforts, Banner loses control, tell him to get everybody out of the building to safety and transforms into the Savage Hulk for the first time in half a decade. Parker attempts to battle the Hulk, but he proves too strong for him. Parker manages to successfully calm the Hulk down as he is dangling from the building, and he willingly falls to the ground. Hulk reverts to Banner, who is then transported to a psychiatric ward.

Several months later, Banner isolates himself in an underground military bunker. While making a recording about a new gamma suppression system, Banner is approached and abducted by Victor von Doom, who triggers his transformation back into the Hulk.

== Alternate versions ==
Other versions of Banner are depicted in the alternate realities of the MCU multiverse.

=== 2012 variant ===
In an alternate 2012, Banner, as the Hulk, and the Avengers defeat the Chitauri army during the Battle of New York. After defeating Loki at Stark Tower, Banner complains that he has to take the stairs and not the elevator like the others. When he gets to the bottom level, he bumps into Earth-616 Stark causing him to drop his briefcase.

=== What If...? ===
Several alternate versions of Banner appear in the animated series What If...?, with Ruffalo reprising his role.

- In an alternate 2010, Banner is on the run from Ross at Culver University when Romanoff finds him there while consulting his love interest, Betty Ross, regarding the deaths of the Avengers Initiative candidates. The three are surrounded by Ross's troops, and Banner transforms into the Hulk after being hit by a bullet. While attacking Ross's men, the Hulk suddenly inflates and explodes due to a Pym Particles disk secretly deployed by Yellowjacket inside his body.
- In an alternate 2018, Banner is sent back to Earth via the Bifrost to warn the Avengers about the impending threat from Thanos. However, he is attacked by zombified versions of Stark, Strange, and Wong before being rescued by Peter Parker and Hope van Dyne. After joining with the other survivors, they journey to Camp Lehigh and encounter Vision, who reveals that the Mind Stone can be used to cure the virus. Banner later stays behind at the camp to fend off a zombified Wanda Maximoff in order to buy the others time to escape to Wakanda.
  - In Marvel Zombies, it is revealed that Banner survived and sacrificed himself to contain the energy of the Infinity Stones following the fallout of Wakanda where T'Challa sacrificed his life to defeat a zombified Thanos blowing up the Stones in the process. In turn, Banner becomes Infinity Hulk. Zombie Wanda, Queen of the Dead, rallies her army to defeat Infinity Hulk and take the raw power of the Infinity Stones for herself. The heroes arrive to help defend the Hulk, but one by one they fall to the overwhelming hordes, which include those who have been infected. Infinity Hulk unleashes a significant amount of his power to defeat Zombie Thor, allowing Zombie Wanda an opening to begin stealing his power and, with Kamala Khan, causing the world to be remade.
- In an alternate 2015, Banner is killed by Ultron, along with the other Avengers (except for Romanoff and Barton), after which Ultron successfully uploads his consciousness into a vibranium body and launches a global nuclear attack.
- In an alternate 2014, Banner is at an Avengers action figure toy store with Barton during the holiday season. They regroup with Stark, Rogers, and Romanoff and return to Avengers Tower. While the others attack the Freak, Banner watches as Barton tells him to help out. Darcy Lewis informs them that the Freak is Happy Hogan (who has accidentally been injected with a sample of Banner's blood that Stark had been experimenting on) and that Justin Hammer had attacked the Tower. Afterwards, they have their annual Christmas party.
- In an alternate universe where Peggy Carter is the First Avenger rather than Steve Rogers, Banner does not appear to have become an Avenger, instead being replaced by the Wasp during the Battle of New York. However, he is mentioned to be an ally of the team and Romanoff suggests enlisting Banner and Stark's help to try to save Rogers from his dependence on the Hydra Stomper suit to live, but Carter refuses as they don't have enough time with all of the world hunting for Rogers after his assassination attempt on Bucky Barnes.
- In an alternate 1602, Banner is a prisoner in the catacombs of King Thor's palace and known as a Man in the Iron Mask variant called the "Monster in the Iron Mask". He is freed by Captain Carter and transforms into the Hulk. He and Carter meet with Stark, and are joined by Rogers Hood, Barnes, and Lang. They make a plan to try and stop an incursion. The Hulk arrives at Thor's courtroom and gives the others the signal to attack, during which he fights against Sir Harold "Happy" Hogan's Freak form. After it is revealed Rogers is the time-displaced person, Carter sends him home and saves the universe.
- In an alternate universe, Banner as the Hulk wielded a sword and an axe which could fire green energy blasts. Hulk's form was also different with large wings, a helmet, and surrounded by glowing green energy. He was captured by Doctor Strange Supreme and held captive in his makeshift dimension. He was later released to be thrown into the Forge and threw his weapons to aid Captain Peggy Carter and Kahhori. Despite Strange's intervention, Banner was saved by Kahhori who used her powers to transport him through a portal back home.
- In an alternate 2024, Banner attempts to bombard himself with more Gamma to rid himself from the Hulk, but it fails and creates a second, monstrous "Apex" Hulk who splits from Banner and becomes a rampaging kaiju capable of spawning an army.
- In an alternate 2012, Hulk and the Avengers were joined by the Red Guardian during the battle of New York.
- In an alternate universe, Banner as Maestro becomes the Sorcerer Supreme.

=== Deadpool & Wolverine ===
A variant of Banner as the Hulk fights a variant of the Wolverine, being briefly interrupted by Wade Wilson of Earth-10005 (Note: The film gives the name "Earth-10005" to the main reality of 20th Century Fox's X-Men film series.) who is trying to find a variant to replace the deceased Wolverine in his timeline.

== Concept and creation ==
The Hulk first appeared as a comic book character in The Incredible Hulk #1 (cover dated May 1962), written by Stan Lee, penciled and co-plotted by Jack Kirby, and inked by Paul Reinman. Lee cited influence from Frankenstein and Dr. Jekyll and Mr. Hyde in the Hulk's creation, while Kirby recalled as inspiration the tale of a mother who rescues her child who is trapped beneath a car. Lee gave the Hulk's alter ego the alliterative name "Bruce Banner" because he found he had less difficulty remembering alliterative names. The Hulk was initially grey, but coloring problems led to the creature being made green. Banner and his alter ego appeared in a 1978 live-action TV series, and in a 2003 film that received mixed reviews, with Marvel Studios regaining the film production rights for the character in February 2006.

In the mid-2000s, Kevin Feige realized that Marvel still owned the rights to the core members of the Avengers, which now included Hulk. Feige, a self-professed "fanboy", envisioned creating a shared universe just as creators Stan Lee and Jack Kirby had done with their comic books in the early 1960s. Louis Leterrier, who had expressed interest in directing Iron Man, was brought on board to direct, with a screenplay by Zak Penn intended to serve as a loose sequel to the 2003 film, but keeping the story closer to the comics and the 1978 television series. David Duchovny was a front-runner for the film, and Leterrier's original choice for the role was Mark Ruffalo. In April 2007, Edward Norton was hired to portray Banner and to rewrite Penn's screenplay in order to distance itself from the 2003 film and establish its own identity as a reboot, although he would go uncredited for his writing. Producer Gale Anne Hurd recalled Norton's portrayals of duality in Primal Fear and Fight Club, while Norton reminded Kevin Feige of Bill Bixby, who had played Banner in the 1978 TV series. Lou Ferrigno, who played the Hulk with Bixby, remarked Norton "has a similar physique [and a] similar personality". Norton was a Hulk fan, citing the first comic appearances, the Bixby TV show, and Bruce Jones' run on the comic, as his favorite depictions of the character. He had expressed interest in the role for the first film. He initially turned down the part, recalling "there [was] the wince factor or the defensive part of you that recoils at what the bad version of what that would be", as he felt the previous film "strayed far afield from a story that was familiar to people, [...] which is a fugitive story". When he met Leterrier and Marvel, he liked their vision, and believed they were looking to him to guide the project. During the 2008 New York Comic Con Leterrier publicly offered Ferrigno the chance to voice the Hulk for the film. Originally, the Hulk's only line was "Betty" at the film's ending, which would have been his first word. Leterrier was aware that fans wanted him to speak normally, and added "leave me alone" and "Hulk smash!" The latter line received cheers during a screening he attended.

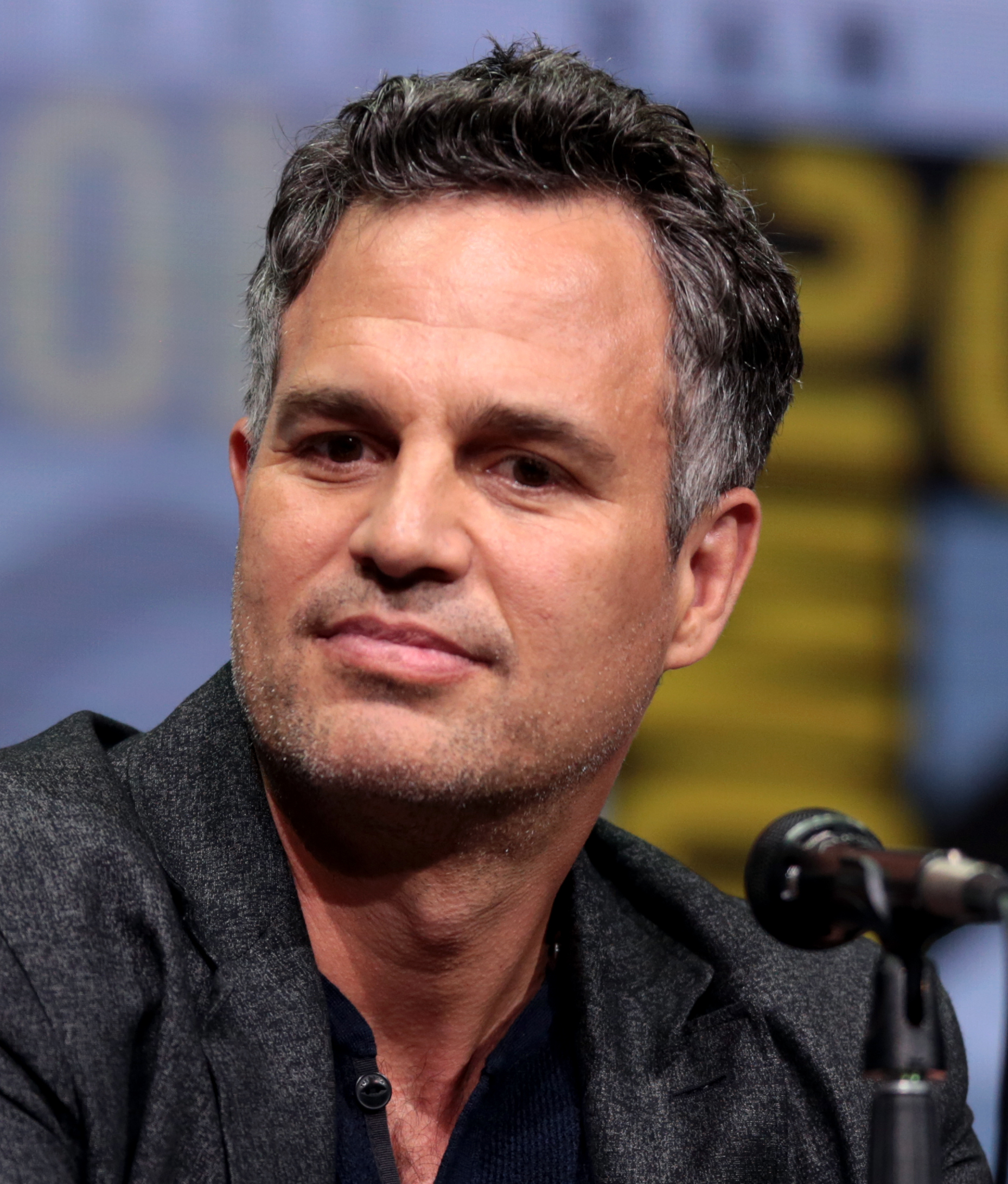
Current portrayer Mark Ruffalo at the 2017 San Diego Comic-Con, promoting Thor: Ragnarok.

Mark Ruffalo began his role as Banner / Hulk in The Avengers, after Feige said he chose not to bring back Norton. Norton has since asserted that it was his own decision never to play Hulk again because he "wanted more diversity" with his career, and did not want to be associated with only one character. Screen Rant has noted that, in part due to the change in actors, "many forget that Incredible Hulk is even canon within the MCU". In April 2012, despite Ruffalo being on board to play the Hulk in the sequel, Feige confirmed to Collider that Marvel had no plans at that time to film another Hulk film. In a Q&A session, Feige and Ruffalo confirmed that discussions were underway to produce another Hulk film due to the positive audience response to Ruffalo's performance in The Avengers. However, Universal retained the distribution rights for The Incredible Hulk as well as the right of first refusal to distribute future Hulk films. In September 2012, Feige, while exploring all possible story options for a sequel film, including a film based on the "Planet Hulk" and "World War Hulk" storylines, stated, "everything [in terms of stories from the comics] is on the table. Do I think Hulk can carry a movie and be as entertaining as he was in Avengers? I do believe that. I do believe he absolutely could. We certainly are not even going to attempt that until Avengers 2. So there's a lot of time to think about it".

In June 2014, Ruffalo said he believed the studio might be considering doing a new standalone Hulk film, saying, "I think they are, for the first time, entertaining the idea of it. When we did The Avengers it was basically 'No!', and now there is some consideration for it. But there's still nothing definitive, not even a skeletal version of what it would be". In July, Feige stated that the studio was not considering a "Planet Hulk" film at that time, due to wanting to feature Ruffalo's Banner in the film. However, he did not rule out a story that saw the Hulk and Banner end up in space and explained why a solo Hulk film did not occur in Phase Two of the MCU by saying, "After the first Avengers, Iron Man had his own movie, Thor had his own movie, Captain America had his own movie, and Widow and Fury were in The Winter Soldier. So it was really about, frankly, saving somebody so that the only place you could get Hulk between Avengers movies is the next Avengers movie, so [director Joss Whedon] could continue to play with that in [Avengers: Age of Ultron]. Where we go after that, we'll see".

In April 2015, Ruffalo noted that Universal holding the distribution rights to Hulk films may be an obstacle to releasing a future Hulk standalone film and reiterated this in October 2015, and July 2017. According to The Hollywood Reporter, a potential reason why Marvel has not reacquired the film distribution rights to the Hulk as they did with Paramount Pictures for the Iron Man, Thor, and Captain America films is that Universal holds the theme park rights to several Marvel characters that Marvel's parent company, Disney, wants for its own theme parks. In December 2015, Ruffalo stated that the strained relationship between Marvel and Universal may be another obstacle to releasing a future standalone Hulk film. The following month, he indicated that the lack of a standalone Hulk film allowed the character to play a more prominent role in Thor: Ragnarok, Avengers: Infinity War, and Avengers: Endgame, stating, "We've worked a really interesting arc into Thor[: Ragnarok], Avengers[: Infinity War], and [Avengers: Endgame] for Banner that I think will—when it's all added up—will feel like a Hulk movie, a standalone movie".

Charles Pulliam-Moore, writing for Gizmodo, said of the earlier MCU films that "[w]hile there are a number of storylines from Marvel's comics that delve deeper into the duality of Banner/Hulk's identity... Marvel's movies have forgone those plot lines in favor of trotting Bruce out to babble about science and break things when necessary". One specific difference from the comic books is Banner's involvement in the creation of Ultron and the Vision, a character who in the comics was created solely by Ultron. The Vision, in the films, is created as a counter to Ultron, who had previously been created by Stark and Bruce Banner. In the comics, however, Ultron is created by a different member of the Avengers, Hank Pym.

Due to the lack of freestanding films about the Hulk, the character has been depicted in very few of the storylines shown in the comic books. In particular, the "Planet Hulk" storyline from the comic books is highly condensed and worked into Thor: Ragnarok; the comic book storyline has the heroes of Earth intentionally sending the Hulk into space due to his excessively dangerous nature, while the MCU Hulk leaves Earth of his own accord. The merged Banner/Hulk storyline depicted in Avengers: Endgame also differs from the comics, where a comparable merger was accomplished by hypnosis performed by superhero psychiatrist Doc Samson. In the MCU, Banner accomplishes the merger by himself, through experimentation with gamma radiation.

== Appearances ==
=== Film ===
Edward Norton portrays Bruce Banner in The Incredible Hulk (2008), with Lou Ferrigno providing the voice of the Hulk. Mark Ruffalo took on the role of Banner in The Avengers (2012), where the voice of the Hulk was a mix of Mark Ruffalo, Lou Ferrigno and two others from New Zealand, though the Hulk's single line of dialogue, "Puny god", was provided solely by Ruffalo. Mike Seymour of FX Guide called Ruffalo's Hulk "the most successful Hulk" in comparison to "the less than fully successful earlier attempts at digital Hulks." Seymour explained, "Ang Lee's 2003 Hulk and "Louis Leterrier's The Incredible Hulk both failed in producing a Hulk that could walk the digital tightrope of impressive near undefeatable strength, huge body mass, fast agile movement, raw anger and likable performance." He stated that on contrary Ruffalo's Hulk had "both dynamic action sequences and crowd pleasing moments of humor and dialogue". In order to achieve this, Industrial Light & Magic created a new motion capture and facial animation system. Hulk's face was generated from a life cast / scan of Ruffalo's face, which was then manipulated in the program ZBrush to become the Hulk, while making sure to retain Ruffalo's essence. Ruffalo reprised the role in Iron Man 3 (2013), Avengers: Age of Ultron (2015), Thor: Ragnarok (2017), Avengers: Infinity War (2018), Captain Marvel (2019), Avengers: Endgame (2019), Shang-Chi and the Legend of the Ten Rings (2021), and Spider-Man: Brand New Day (2026).

A sequel to The Incredible Hulk has been discussed, with Marvel Studios having suggested a possible release after Avengers: Age of Ultron due to the positive audience reception towards Ruffalo's portrayal of Banner in The Avengers. Ruffalo is set to reprise his role in any future adaptation of the character. In June 2014, Ruffalo said he believed the studio might be considering doing a new standalone Hulk film, saying, "I think they are, for the first time, entertaining the idea of it. When we did The Avengers it was basically 'No!', and now there is some consideration for it. But there's still nothing definitive, not even a skeletal version of what it would be." In December 2014, Joss Whedon said despite the positive reception to Ruffalo, a new solo Hulk film had not been announced because Marvel wished to have a character that only appears in Avengers films. In April 2015, Ruffalo told Collider that Universal holding the distribution rights to Hulk films may be an obstacle to releasing a future Hulk standalone film. Walt Disney Studios Motion Pictures regained the film distribution rights to The Incredible Hulk in June 2023, coinciding with the film's release on Disney+.

=== Television ===
Archival footage of the character appears in "Glorious Purpose", the first episode of the Disney+ television series Loki (2021). Ruffalo voices alternate versions of Banner in the Disney+ animated series What If...? (2021–2023). Ruffalo reprised his role in She-Hulk: Attorney at Law (2022).

=== Other media ===
- Norton reprised his role as Bruce Banner in the video game The Incredible Hulk (2008).
- Ruffalo reprised his role as Bruce Banner in the non-canon short film Team Thor (2016).

== Characterization ==
For The Incredible Hulk, Louis Leterrier stated that Edward Norton's rewrite of the script "has given Bruce's story real gravitas", explaining that "just because we're making a superhero movie it doesn't have to just appeal to 13-year-old boys. Ed and I both see superheroes as the new Greek gods".

In taking up the character for The Avengers, Mark Ruffalo said, "He's a guy struggling with two sides of himself—the dark and the light—and everything he does in his life is filtered through issues of control. I grew up on the Bill Bixby TV Series, which I thought was a really nuanced and real human way to look at the Hulk. I like that the part has those qualities". Regarding the Hulk's place on the team, Ruffalo said, "He's like the teammate none of them are sure they want on their team. He's a loose cannon. It's like, 'Just throw a grenade in the middle of the group and let's hope it turns out well!"

By Avengers: Age of Ultron, Ruffalo stated that his character had grown since the previous film and was "a bit more complex", with a confrontation brewing between Banner and the Hulk: "There's a very cool thing happening: Hulk is as afraid of Banner as Banner is afraid of Hulk.. and they have got to come to peace somehow with each other." While filming in London, Ruffalo said that Whedon still had not given him any of the Hulk's lines. Whedon later explained that he writes the Hulk's dialogue spontaneously, saying, "What makes the Hulk so hard to write is that you're pretending he's a werewolf when he's a superhero. You want it vice versa... So the question is, how has he progressed? How can we bring changes on what the Hulk does? And that's not just in the screenplay, that's moment to moment."

When the character next appears in Thor: Ragnarok, two years have passed since Age of Ultron, and Hulk has become a successful and popular gladiator on Sakaar, having suppressed the Banner side in those years. He is forming the vocabulary "of a toddler", with the level of Hulk's speech being "a big conversation" between director Taika Waititi and Marvel since it was taking into account future appearances for the character: Ragnarok begins an arc for the character that continues in Avengers: Infinity War (2018) and Avengers: Endgame (2019). Ruffalo felt Hulk had "a swagger" in the film, and was "much more of a character than the green rage machine" seen in the first two Avengers films.

The Hulk only appears briefly at the beginning of Infinity War, with Bruce Banner spending the film trying to reintegrate with the Avengers, and to "impress upon everybody how dangerous Thanos is". Joe Russo felt the Hulk refusing to appear for much of the film was only partially because he was scared, but also because he realizes that "Banner only wants Hulk for fighting. I think he's had enough of saving Banner's ass." Russo added that this was "really reflective of the journey from Ragnarok... [where] these two characters are constantly in conflict with each other over control." The difference between Hulk and Banner is intended to be shown as "starting to blur a little bit". Ruffalo described Hulk in Infinity War as having the mental capacity of a five-year-old. Despite the lack of further standalone films, "Bruce and the Hulk have managed to eke out a character arc in the six years since The Avengers", with Thor: Ragnarok and Infinity War highlighting an ongoing battle for control of which persona will manifest, expected to be resolved in Avengers: Endgame. In Avengers: Endgame, the Bruce Banner and the Hulk personalities are shown to have reconciled and merged into Professor Hulk, who has the strength of the Hulk but the intelligence of Bruce Banner.

== Appearance and special effects ==
In filming The Incredible Hulk, Leterrier cited Andy Serkis' motion capture portrayals of Gollum and King Kong in The Lord of the Rings and King Kong, respectively, as the standard for which he was aiming. Norton and Roth filmed 2500 takes of different movements the monsters would make (such as the Hulk's "thunder claps"). Phosphorescent face paint applied to the actors' faces and strobe lighting would help record the most subtle mannerisms into the computer. Others including Cyril Raffaelli provided motion capture for stunts and fights, after the main actors had done video referencing. Leterrier hired Rhythm and Hues to provide the CGI, rather than Industrial Light & Magic (ILM) who created the visual effects for Ang Lee's Hulk. Visual effect company, Image Engine, spent over a year working on a shot where Banner's gamma-irradiated blood falls through three factory floors into a bottle. Overall 700 effects shots were created. Motion capture aided in placing and timing of movements, but overall key frame animation by Rhythm and Hues provided the necessary "finesse [and] superhero quality". Dale Keown's comic book artwork of the Hulk was an inspiration for his design. Leterrier felt the first Hulk had "too much fat [and] the proportions were a little off". He explained, "The Hulk is beyond perfect so there is zero grams of fat, all chiseled, and his muscle and strength defines this creature so he's like a tank." Visual effects supervisor Kurt Williams envisioned the Hulk's physical as a linebacker rather than a bodybuilder. A height of nine feet was chosen for the character as they did not want him to be too inhuman. To make him more expressive, computer programs controlling the inflation of his muscles and saturation of skin color were created. Williams cited flushing as an example of humans' skin color being influenced by their emotions. The animators felt green blood would make his skin become darker rather than lighter, and his skin tones, depending on lighting, either resemble an olive or even gray slate. His animation model was completed without the effects company's full knowledge of what he would be required to do: he was rigged to do whatever they imagined, in case the model was to be used for The Avengers film. The Hulk's medium-length hair was modeled on Mike Deodato's art. He originally had a crew cut, but Leterrier decided flopping hair imbued him with more character. Leterrier cited An American Werewolf in London as the inspiration for Banner's transformation, wanting to show how painful it was for him to change. As a nod to the live action TV series, Banner's eyes change Green color first when he transforms.

The Avengers was the first production in which the actor playing Banner also plays the Hulk. Ruffalo told New York magazine, "I'm really excited. No one's ever played the Hulk exactly; they've always done CGI. They're going to do the Avatar stop-action, stop-motion capture. So I'll actually play the Hulk. That'll be fun". The 3D model used to create the Hulk's body was modeled after Long Island bodybuilder and male stripper Steve Romm, while the Hulk's face was modeled after Ruffalo. To create the on-screen Hulk, Ruffalo performed in a motion-capture suit on set with the other actors while four motion-capture HD cameras (two full body, two focused on his face) captured his face and body movements. ILM returned to create the digital Hulk. Jeff White, ILM's visual effects supervisor, said, "We really wanted to utilize everything we've developed the last 10 years and make it a pretty spectacular Hulk. One of the great design decisions was to incorporate Mark Ruffalo into the look of him. So, much of Hulk is based on Ruffalo and his performance, not only in motion capture and on set, but down to his eyes, his teeth, and his tongue."

For Thor: Ragnarok, ILM had to add much more detail to the character's facial features, due to the Hulk's increased dialogue. ILM visual effects supervisor Chad Wiebe explained that Ruffalo's expressions were captured fresh for the film using Medusa, a performance capture technology. The Hulk have a crew cut with a blunt, bowl-like fringe. The Hulk's voice was blended by Ruffalo’s vocal performance and Hulk's signature Growling to produce the “auto-tune” artifacts when used aggressively. With 90 different expressions captured, ILM "built an entirely new library that would allow [Hulk] to cover a full range of normal human visual characteristics." To help create the Hulk, a person on set was covered in green body paint, and would replicate the intended motions of the character to aid the visual effect artists. Additionally, stunt actor Paul Lowe, who is under 5 feet (1.5 m) tall, stood in for Hemsworth during some of his interactions with the Hulk so that the Hulk's stunt men would be proportionally correct. In some instances when Thor and the Hulk interacted, a digital double was used for Thor, also created by ILM, to have greater flexibility for the shots. ILM worked on all of the Hulk moments in the film outside the final fight sequence, which was completed by Framestore using ILM's assets, as Framestore was primarily responsible for rigging that sequence. Framestore completed nearly 460 shots, which featured digital doubles of Thor and Hela, Fenris, Korg, Miek, the giant Surtur at the end of the film, and over 9,000 buildings for Asgard, based on assets D Negative had from The Dark World, resulting in over 263 character, vehicle, prop, and crowd rigs. Taika Waititi also provided additional motion capture for the Hulk after Ruffalo had completed his scenes.

With respect to Bruce Banner's regular appearance, his fashion sense has been critiqued with the observation that "in just about every appearance, he's wearing a nondescript suit with a purple button down shirt". By contrast, Banner's "Professor Hulk" appearance in Avengers: Endgame, including his penchant for knit sweaters, has been described as "hot" and "sexy".

== Reception ==
Norton's performance as Banner received a generally positive reception. Reviewing The Incredible Hulk, Mark Rahner of The Seattle Times wrote that, "The relaunch of Marvel's green goliath is an improvement over director Ang Lee's ponderous 2003 Hulk in nearly every way—except that the actual Hulk still looks scarcely better than something from a video game, and he still barely talks". Conversely, Christy Lemire of the Associated Press found that "the inevitable comparisons to Iron Man, Marvel Studios' first blockbuster this summer, serve as a glaring reminder of what this Hulk lacks: wit and heart. Despite the presence of Edward Norton, an actor capable of going just as deep as Robert Downey Jr., we don't feel a strong sense of Bruce Banner's inner conflict".

Mark Ruffalo's portrayal of Bruce Banner / the Hulk in The Avengers was well received by commentators. Joe Neumaier opined that his performance was superior to the rest of the cast; "Ruffalo is the revelation, turning Banner into a wry reservoir of calm ready to become a volcano." Similarly, The New Yorker's Anthony Lane proclaimed Ruffalo's acting to be one of the film's highlights—alongside Downey. The Village Voice's Karina Longworth concluded: "Ruffalo successfully refreshes the Hulk myth, playing Banner as an adorably bashful nerd-genius who, in contrast to the preening hunks on the team, knows better than to draw attention to himself." Peter Travers of Rolling Stone asserted that the actor resonated a "scruffy warmth and humor" vibe, while Kenneth Turan of Los Angeles Times felt that he surpassed predecessors Edward Norton and Eric Bana in playing the character. Owen Gleiberman of Entertainment Weekly wrote that "the smartest thing the filmmakers did was to get Mark Ruffalo to play Bruce Banner as a man so sensitive that he's at war, every moment, with himself. (The film finally solves the Hulk problem: He's a lot more fun in small doses)".

=== Accolades ===
| Year | Film | Actor | Award | Category | Result | Ref(s) |
|---|---|---|---|---|---|---|
| 2008 | The Incredible Hulk | Edward Norton | National Movie Awards | Best Performance – Male | Nominated | |
| 2008 | The Incredible Hulk | Edward Norton | Scream Awards | Best Fantasy Actor | Nominated | |
| 2008 | The Incredible Hulk | Edward Norton | Scream Awards | Best Superhero | Nominated | |
| 2012 | The Avengers | Mark Ruffalo | Teen Choice Awards | Choice Movie Hissy Fit | Nominated | |
| 2013 | The Avengers | Mark Ruffalo | Visual Effects Society Awards | Outstanding Animated Character in a Live Action Feature Motion Picture | Nominated | |
| 2013 | The Avengers | Mark Ruffalo | MTV Movie Awards | Best On-Screen Duo (with Robert Downey Jr.) | Nominated | |
| 2013 | The Avengers | Mark Ruffalo | MTV Movie Awards | Best Fight (with cast) | Won | |
| 2013 | The Avengers | Mark Ruffalo | MTV Movie Awards | Best Hero | Nominated | |
| 2016 | Avengers: Age of Ultron | Mark Ruffalo | 43rd Annie Awards | Outstanding Achievement, Character Animation in a Live Action Production (Note: Recipients are Jakub Pistecky, Gang Trinh, Craig Penn, Mickael Coedel, Yair Gutierrez.) | Nominated | |
| 2016 | Avengers: Age of Ultron | Mark Ruffalo | MTV Movie Awards | Best Fight (with Robert Downey Jr.) | Nominated | |
| 2018 | Thor: Ragnarok | Mark Ruffalo | MTV Movie & TV Awards | Best Fight (with Chris Hemsworth) | Nominated | |
| 2018 | Thor: Ragnarok | Mark Ruffalo | Teen Choice Awards | Choice Movie Actor: Sci-Fi/Fantasy | Nominated | |
| 2018 | Avengers: Infinity War | Mark Ruffalo | Teen Choice Awards | Choice Hissy Fit | Nominated | |

== See also ==
- Characters of the Marvel Cinematic Universe
- Hulk in other media
