= Fxguide =

Visual effects community website

Fxguide logo

Fxguide (Note: Trademarked as fxguide, and marketed variously as fxguide and fxGuide, sometimes rendered FXGuide.) is a visual-effects and post-production community website founded by three visual-effects artists, Jeff Heusser, John Montgomery, and Mike Seymour.

== History ==
Fxguide began in 1999 as a website to expand on tips, tricks, and frequently asked questions arising on the email mailing list "flame-news", which related to the compositing application Discreet Flame. Fxguide was founded by Mike Seymour, John Montgomery, and Jeff Heusser. Initially, the focus was on high-end compositing, but the site evolved over the years to encompass visual-effects news and training on the Web. It has since been split into the free fxguide website for news and interviews, and the membership-based fxphd visual-effects training site.

On 27 June 2005, the site began a podcast titled "fxpodcast", featuring interviews with artists as well as manufacturers. On 18 July 2007, "fxguidetv" launched as an HD-video podcast featuring film-scene reviews and industry coverage as well as interviews. The show is hosted by Angie Dale (née Richards). On 2 April 2008, fxguide added another regular podcast, "red centre", which started focused on the RED camera and has grown to cover all aspects of digital cinematography. Hosted by Mike Seymour and Jason Wingrove. In 2010, show's title was changed to "the rc". While "the rc" has now stopped, the "VFXshow" podcast continues with regular hosts Mike Seymour, Matt Wallin, and Jason Diamond, with a range of guest hosts.

Jeff Heusser died in 2018; fxguide continued with John Montgomery and Mike Seymour.

From 2011 to 2012, fxguide did special video segments for The Daily titled "Behind the Scenes". The team has since done another webseries for Wired, "Design-fx".

Mike Seymour also founded the Motus Lab at the University of Sydney, having got a PhD in digital humans, and having been involved in the Epic Games MeetMike project at SIGGRAPH.
