= Stacey Schroeder =

American film editor

- Occupation: Film editor

Stacey Schroeder is an American film editor. Schroeder's credits include Now You See Me: Now You Don't, directed by Ruben Fleischer; episodes of She-Hulk: Attorney at Law; Cinderella and Blockers, directed by Kay Cannon; Sonic the Hedgehog, directed by Jeff Fowler; The Disaster Artist, directed by James Franco; and the pilot of Fox's The Last Man on Earth, directed by Phil Lord and Chris Miller, for which she was nominated for the Primetime Emmy Award for Outstanding Single-Camera Picture Editing for a Comedy Series in 2015.

Schroeder's film work also includes Popstar: Never Stop Never Stopping (along with editors Jamie Gross and Craig Alpert), directed by Akiva Schaffer and Jorma Taccone; and Poolman, directed by Chris Pine. Her television work also includes HBO's Eastbound & Down; FXX's You're the Worst; Netflix's Girlboss; IFC's Garfunkel & Oats; and the pilot for HBO's Max, directed by Lena Dunham.

Schroeder was interviewed about her work editing Now You See Me: Now You Don't on an episode of The Rough Cut podcast published December 22, 2025.

Raised in New Port Richey, Florida, Schroeder graduated from the University of Florida with a B.A. in Film Production and Art History.

== Film ==
- Now You See Me: Now You Don't (2025)
- Poolman (2023)
- Cinderella (2021)
- Sonic the Hedgehog (2020)
- Blockers (2018)
- The Disaster Artist (2017)
- Popstar: Never Stop Never Stopping (2016)

== Television ==
- She-Hulk: Attorney at Law (2022)
- Girlboss (2017)
- Max (2016)
- The Last Man on Earth (2015)
- Garfunkel & Oates (2014)
- You're the Worst (2014)
- Morgan Murphy: Irish Goodbye (2014)
- Eastbound & Down (2013)
