= Florian Ballhaus =

German cinematographer

- Born: 1965 (age 60–61); Baden-Baden, West Germany
- Spouse: Pamela Katz
- Parent(s): Helga Maria Betten Ballhaus; Michael Ballhaus
- Relatives: Sebastian Ballhaus (brother); Lena Hutter (grandmother); Oskar Ballhaus (grandfather)

Florian Marc Ballhaus (born 1965) is a German cinematographer, best known for his work in romantic comedy films and for his collaboration with director Robert Schwentke.

== Early life ==
Ballhaus was born in Baden-Baden, Germany, the son of Helga Mavia Betten and noted German cinematographer Michael Ballhaus.

At the age of 16, he moved to the U.S. with his family when his father began working on American films.

== Career ==
Ballhaus began working as a cinematographer's second assistant before becoming camera assistant, and then operator. He returned to Germany in his adulthood, debuting in episodes of the TV series Alles außer Mord.

Ballhaus then returned to the U.S., shooting episodes of Sex and the City before working on feature films.

== Filmography ==
=== Film ===
Year	Title	Director
1998	Trial by Fire	Janek Rieke
2001	Investigating Sex	Alan Rudolph
2002	The Secret Lives of Dentists	Alan Rudolph
2003	Eierdiebe	Robert Schwentke
2005	Flightplan	Robert Schwentke
2006	The Devil Wears Prada	David Frankel
2008	Definitely, Maybe	Adam Brooks
2008	Marley & Me	David Frankel
2009	The Time Traveler's Wife	Robert Schwentke
2009	Did You Hear About the Morgans?	Marc Lawrence
2010	Red	Robert Schwentke
2011	Mr. Popper's Penguins	Mark Waters
2012	Hope Springs	David Frankel
2012	Gambit	Michael Hoffman
2013	One Chance	David Frankel
2013	The Book Thief	Brian Percival
2014	Lullaby	Andrew Levitas
2015	The Divergent Series: Insurgent	Robert Schwentke
2016	The Divergent Series: Allegiant	Robert Schwentke
2017	Snatched	Jonathan Levine
2017	The Captain	Robert Schwentke
2018	I Feel Pretty	Abby Kohn; Marc Silverstein
2020	The One and Only Ivan	Thea Sharrock
2022	Marry Me	Kat Coiro
2023	Your Place or Mine	Aline Brosh McKenna
2025	The Life List	Adam Brooks
2025	Nonnas	Stephen Chbosky
2026	The Devil Wears Prada 2	David Frankel

=== Television ===
Year	Title	Director	Notes
1995–1996	Alles außer Mord	Nikolai Müllerschön; Reinhard Münster	Episodes "Tödlicher Irrtum" and "Blackout"
2003–2004	Sex and the City	David Frankel; Alan Taylor; Michael Patrick King; Wendey Stanzler; Julian Farino	10 episodes
2009	Lie to Me	Robert Schwentke	Episode "Pilot"
2014	Girlfriends' Guide to Divorce	Adam Brooks	Episode "Rule No. 23: Never Lie to the Kids"
2020	The Baker and the Beauty	David Frankel	Episode "Pilot"
2022	She-Hulk: Attorney at Law	Kat Coiro	6 episodes
2024	The Spiderwick Chronicles	Kat Coiro	2 episodes
