= After the End =

After the End may refer to:

- After the End (play), a 2005 play by Dennis Kelly
- After the End (album), a 2014 album by Merchandise
- After the End (film), a 2017 American film
