= Suncoast (film) =

2024 film by Laura Chinn

- Official poster
- Directed by: Laura Chinn
- Written by: Laura Chinn
- Produced by: Jeremy Plager; Francesca Silvestri; Kevin Chinoy; Oly Obst
- Starring: Laura Linney; Nico Parker; Woody Harrelson; Matt Walsh
- Cinematography: Bruce Francis Cole
- Edited by: Sara Shaw
- Music by: Este Haim; Christopher Stracey
- Production companies: Freestyle Picture Company; 7 Deuce Entertainment; 3 Arts Entertainment
- Distributed by: Searchlight Pictures
- Release dates: January 21, 2024 (Sundance); February 2, 2024 (United States); February 9, 2024 (Hulu)
- Running time: 109 minutes
- Country: United States
- Language: English

Suncoast is a 2024 American coming-of-age drama film written and directed by Laura Chinn, in her feature directorial debut. It stars Laura Linney, Nico Parker and Woody Harrelson. The film's screenplay, written by Chinn and based on her life experience from the early 2000s, was included in the 2020 Black List.

The film premiered at the Sundance Film Festival on January 21, 2024. It was released in selected theaters in the United States on February 2, 2024, followed by a streaming release on Hulu on February 9, by Searchlight Pictures.

== Plot ==
In 2005, teenager Doris lives in Florida with her mother, Kristine, and her brother, Max, who is dying from brain cancer. Doris has spent much of her adolescence helping care for Max while Kristine works. As Max’s condition worsens, he is moved to the Suncoast hospice for end-of-life care. The facility is also caring for Terri Schiavo, whose highly publicized case has attracted protesters and increased security outside the hospice.

Kristine decides to remain at Suncoast with Max, leaving Doris home alone. At school, Doris begins socializing with a group of classmates and offers her house as a place for them to gather. She begins attending parties and spending more time with her new friends. Around the same time, Doris meets Paul, an activist protesting outside Suncoast, after he pays for her meal at a restaurant. The two become friends and begin spending time together.

Doris’s growing independence causes further conflict with Kristine, who remains focused on Max’s declining health. Doris continues spending time with her classmates and Paul while struggling with her responsibilities toward her family. Paul encourages Doris to repair her relationship with her mother and to spend time with Max while she still can.

While Doris is out with her friends, Kristine calls and tells her that Max is close to death. Doris rushes to Suncoast but discovers that Kristine lied about the severity of his condition to make her return. Furious, Doris leaves. When she returns to school, Nate asks her to prom, and she accepts.

As Doris prepares for prom, Kristine calls again and tells her that Max is dying. Because of Kristine’s earlier deception, Doris chooses to attend prom. While there, she becomes concerned about Max and leaves early, asking the limousine driver to take her to Suncoast. Doris arrives after Max has died and breaks down upon realizing that she missed his final moments. Kristine comforts her as they grieve together.

Following Max’s death, Doris speaks with Paul and finds comfort in their conversation. Doris and Kristine begin to reconcile as they cope with Max’s death and leave Suncoast together.

== Cast ==
- Nico Parker as Doris
- Laura Linney as Kristine
- Woody Harrelson as Paul Warren
- Daniella Taylor as Laci
- Ella Anderson as Brittany
- Amarr as Nate
- Ariel Martin as Megan Kaminski
- Keyla Monterroso Mejia as Nurse Mia
- Pam Dougherty as Sue
- Jason Burkey as Officer Chauncey
- Parker Sack as Adam
- Matt Walsh as Mr. Ladd
- Scott MacArthur as Sweet n' Low

== Production ==
In August 2022, it was reported that Woody Harrelson and Laura Linney would star in the film, and be distributed by Searchlight Pictures.

Principal photography began in Charleston, South Carolina on September 20, 2022. Filming halted later that month due to Hurricane Ian. Filming resumed in Moncks Corner, South Carolina in October 2022.

The film completed post-production in late 2023.

== Release ==
Suncoast premiered in the U.S. Dramatic Competition at the 2024 Sundance Film Festival on January 21, 2024. Nico Parker won the Sundance Special Jury Award for Breakthrough Performance. The film was released in selected theaters in the United States for a one-week engagement on February 2, 2024, followed by a streaming release on February 9 on Hulu in the United States, on Star+ in Latin America, and on Disney+ in other territories, by Searchlight Pictures.

== Reception ==
=== Audience viewership ===
According to the streaming aggregator JustWatch, Suncoast was the third most streamed film in the United States during the week of February 4 to February 11, 2024. According to the streaming aggregator Reelgood, It was the ninth most streamed film in the United States during the week of February 14, 2024.

=== Critical response ===
On the review aggregator website Rotten Tomatoes, 76% of 97 critics' reviews are positive. The website's consensus reads: "A well-acted depiction of grief and self-discovery, Suncoast often overcomes its reliance on broad coming-of-age tropes with a light touch and a charming ensemble cast." Metacritic, which uses a weighted average, assigned the film a score of 61 out of 100, based on 23 critics, indicating "generally favorable" reviews.

Pete Hammond of Deadline Hollywood gave the film a positive review and wrote, “For Chinn this is clearly all personal, and though she has worked as a showrunner in television projects such as Florida Girls, this fine and moving drama marks a leap forward in a career that undoubtedly will be one to watch.” Esther Zuckerman of IndieWire graded the film a C+.
