= Dot-Marie Jones =

American actress and retired athlete (born 1964)

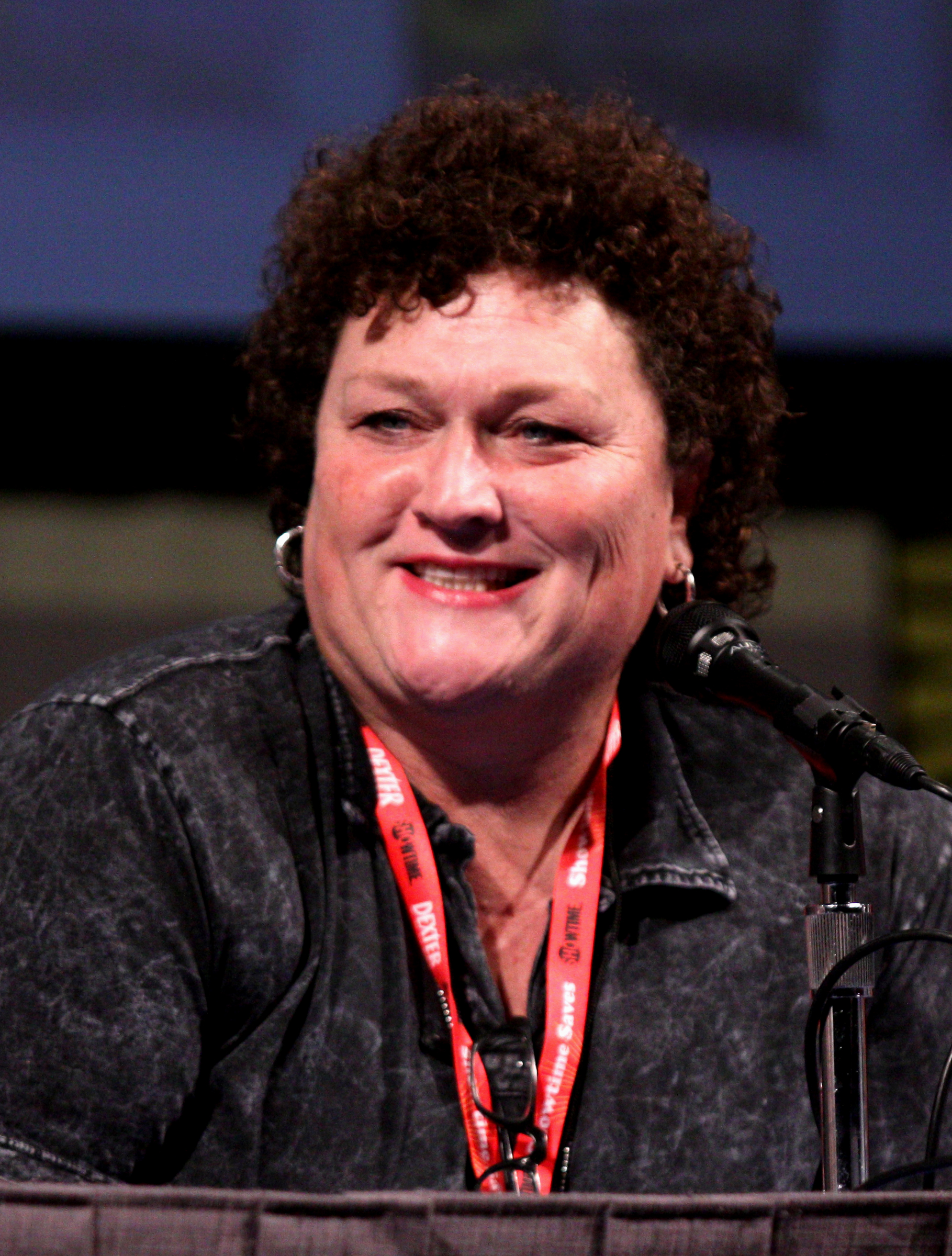
- Jones at San Diego Comic-Con in July 2011
- Born: January 4, 1964 (age 62); Turlock, California, U.S.
- Education: Fresno State
- Occupations: Athlete; actress
- Years active: 1992–present
- Height: 6 ft 3.25 in (1.91 m)
- Spouse: Bridgett Casteen (m. 2013)

Dot-Marie Jones (born January 4, 1964) is an American actress and retired athlete who has had multiple roles in television. She attended California State University, Fresno, where she set records for shot put. Jones is also a 15-time world arm wrestling champion. She was a recurring guest star starting in the second season of the musical television series Glee as Coach Beiste, and appeared through the show's sixth and final season, when she was promoted to starring status. She was nominated for the Primetime Emmy Award for Outstanding Guest Actress in a Comedy Series in 2011, 2012, and 2013 for her portrayal of Coach Beiste. She is also known for her roles as Coach Kelly in Lizzie McGuire and as Butch Brenda in Material Girls.

== Early life ==
Jones was born January 4, 1964, in Turlock, California, and was raised in Hilmar, California. She first got involved in strength competitions at a fairly young age. She started track in middle school. While Jones attended Hilmar High School, she was a champion weight lifter and named female athlete of the year. She started arm wrestling on a whim, and won her first arm wrestling world championship at 19 years old and went on to win 14 more.

After graduating from Hilmar High School, Jones attended Modesto Junior College and Fresno State, where she continued her involvement with sports. She earned a scholarship in track which paid her way through junior college and university. Jones played softball and competed in shot put and powerlifting. She won All-America honors in shot put both at junior college and university, was state champion in 1983 and 1984 and set the national record at the junior college level from 1983 to 1990. Jones qualified for the U.S. Olympic Trials in 1988 for shot put with a 56 ft 6 1/4 in (17.23 m) throw, surpassing the qualifying mark of 55 ft (17 m). She finished sixth. During her sporting career, she suffered 11 knee injuries, bringing her height of 6 ft 4 in (1.93 m) down to 6 ft 3 in (1.91 m). After college, Jones worked as a youth counselor at the Fresno County Juvenile Probation center while continuing her involvement with sports.

== Acting career ==
Jones, who originally had no acting aspirations, was discovered at a bodybuilding competition by Shirley Eson of American Gladiators fame. Eson urged Jones to audition for the Gladiators-like Knights and Warriors, and Jones got the part, becoming one of the few female warriors. Jones was also offered a position in professional wrestling, but turned it down because, she said it was "too fakey."

After Knights and Warriors finished after one season, she became a bit actor. She played small roles in several television series throughout the 1990s and 2000s and breaking into feature films in the late 1990s, including the cult film The Boondock Saints. While acting, Jones kept up her involvement with arm wrestling. In 1995, her biceps measured 17 1/2 in (44.45 cm).

Jones' first recurring role after Knights was as a character named "Dot" on the popular show Married... with Children in the mid-90s. She appeared in five episodes over two seasons. Jones' next break was on the kids show Lizzie McGuire as Coach Kelly. Since then, she has appeared in popular shows Nip/Tuck, Desperate Housewives, and Prison Break. Dot Jones co-starred with Hilary Duff in Lizzie McGuire. They were later reunited for Material Girls.

Jones, being a fan of Glee and having worked with series co-creator Ryan Murphy on Nip/Tuck and Pretty/Handsome, asked co-executive producer Brad Falchuk during an encounter at a supermarket if she could be on the show. Soon after, the character of Coach Beiste in Glee was created for her. She guest starred in seasons two, three, four, and five, and was a main cast member for the sixth and final season. The show allowed her to showcase her singing abilities. Her first song was "One Bourbon, One Scotch, One Beer" with Matthew Morrison's character Will Schuester. It was featured on Glee: The Music, The Complete Season Two. She also recorded versions of Taylor Swift's "Mean" and Dolly Parton's "Jolene". These were included on the album Glee: The Music, The Complete Season Three.

She also had roles in Jane the Virgin and Modern Family.

Jones appeared on Logo TV's RuPaul's Drag U as a visiting professor in July 2011, during the second season.

== Personal life ==
Jones married Bridgett Casteen on December 21, 2013. The two first met in December 2010 and Jones proposed on October 4, 2013, during Gay Days Anaheim.

== Filmography ==
=== Film ===
Key
†	Denotes films that have not yet been released

Year	Film	Role	Notes
1998	Patch Adams	Miss Meat	
1999	The Boondock Saints	Rosengurtle Baumgartener	
2002	Stray Dogs	Jolene Carter	
2006	Material Girls	Butch Brenda	
2011	Bad Teacher	Pill-Providing Lady	Uncredited
2013	White T	Thelma	
2014	Muffin Top: A Love Story	Christina	
2017	After the End	Mom	Originally titled I'm OK
2018	Hurricane Bianca 2: From Russia with Hate	Svetlana	
2019	Greener Grass	Little Helen	
2019	3 from Hell	Prisoner #1	
2020	The Swing of Things	Sex Coach	
2020	Golden Arm	Big Sexy	
2022	Bros	Cherry	
2022	Weird: The Al Yankovic Story	Mama Bear	
2022	Bar Fight!	Elena	
2024	Lost & Found in Cleveland	Sharon Weymouth	
2025	Don't Tell Larry	Kim	
2026	Breeder	Patti	
2026	Quarter	Annie	Post-production
TBA	Princess †	TBA	Post-production
TBA	Thud †	TBA	Post-production

=== Television ===
Year	Title	Role	Notes
1992	Knights and Warriors	Lady Battleaxe	Unknown episodes
1994	Full House	Muscular woman	Episode: "I've Got a Secret"
1994–1995	Married... with Children	Lola	Episode: "Kelly Breaks Out"
1994–1995	Married... with Children	Dot	4 episodes
1995	Can't Hurry Love	Cleo	Episode: "Glove Story"
1995	In the House	Dot	Episode: "Kindergarten Doc"
1995	Boston Common	Jocelyn	Episode: "The Finals Curtain"
1997	The Naked Truth	Sheila	Episode: "The Source"
1997	Roseanne	Black Widow	Episode: "Roseanne-Feld"
1998	Tracey Takes On...	Female golfer	Episode: "Religion"
1998	Dharma & Greg	Hey-19	Episode: "Invasion of the Buddy Snatcher"
1998	Cybill	Suspect #5	Episode: "Daddy"
2000	Chicago Hope	Death Angel	Episode: "Cold Hearts"
2001–2003	Lizzie McGuire	Coach Kelly	5 episodes
2002	She Spies	Leon	Episode: "Perilyzed"
2004	My Wife and Kids	Toni/Tonia Fogle	2 episodes
2005	My Wife and Kids	Nurse Tiffany	Episode: "The 'V' Story"
2006	The Suite Life of Zack & Cody	Gretel	Episode: "Bowling"
2006	Reba	Dot	Episode: "Let's Get Physical"
2007	George Lopez	The Inmate	2 episodes
2008	iCarly	Prison guard	Episode: "iChristmas"
2008	According to Jim	Betty	Episode: "Cabin Boys"
2009	Nip/Tuck	Tess	3 episodes
2009	Desperate Housewives	Prison guard	Episode: "Look Into Their Eyes and You See What They Know"
2009	Prison Break: The Final Break	Skittlez	Television movie
2009	The Mentalist	Airport Manager	Episode: "Carnelian, Inc."
2009	Prison Break	Skittlez	2 episodes
2009	10 Things I Hate About You	Lunch Lady	Episode: "Meat is Murder"
2009	Scare Tactics	Dot	2 episodes
2010	Cougar Town	Mugger	Episode: "What Are You Doing In My Life?"
2010	HawthoRNe	Dot	4 episodes
2010–2015	Glee	Shannon/Sheldon Beiste	34 episodes Recurring cast (seasons 2–5); main cast (season 6); Nominated—Primetime Emmy Award for Outstanding Guest Actress in a Comedy Series (2011–13); Nominated—Screen Actors Guild Award for Outstanding Performance by an Ensemble in a Comedy Series (2011–12)
2010–2012	Venice: The Series	Stella	24 episodes
2011	RuPaul's Drag U	Herself	Episode: "Lesbians Gone Wild"
2011	The Glee Project	Herself	2 episodes
2012	Are You There, Chelsea?	Patty	Episode: "Pilot"
2012	The Pyramid	Herself	5 episodes
2012	The Penguins of Madagascar	Supervisor Eubanks (voice)	Episode: "Smotherly Love"
2012	The Exes	Woman #3	Episode: "Sister Act"
2012	Celebrity Ghost Stories	Herself	Episode: "Victoria Rowell/Dot Jones/Carlos Mencia/Linda Blair"
2012–2013	Have You Met Miss Jones?	Miss Lolly	4 episodes
2014	Baby Daddy	Masha	Episode: "An Affair Not to Remember"
2014	Playing House	Biker	Episode: "Bugs in Your Eyes"
2014	The Millers	Duke	Episode: "Movin' Out (Carol's Song)"
2014	The Haunting of...	Herself	Episode: "Dot Jones"
2015	Doc McStuffins	Coach Kay (voice)	Episode: "Getting to the Heart of Things"
2015	Clipped	Dottie	Episode: "Mo's Ma"
2016	2 Broke Girls	Big Reba	Episode: "And the 80's Movie"
2016	Jane the Virgin	Magda's Prison Friend	Episode: "Chapter Forty-Eight"
2016	Days of Our Lives	Chillie	2 episodes
2017	Modern Family	Louise	Episode: "Finding Fizbo"
2017	Dropping the Soap	Vivian	Episode: "Drama-Con"
2017	Teachers	Marta	Episode: "In Security"
2017	Doubt	Judge Pauline Perillo	Episode: "Top Dog/Underdog"
2017	American Horror Story: Cult	Butchy May	Episode: "Valerie Solanas Died for Your Sins: Scumbag"
2018–2019	The Resident	Meg Mullins	2 episodes
2019	This Close	Judy	Episode: "It's About Time"
2019	The Rookie	Opal	Episode: "Tough Love"
2020	The Goldbergs	Sister Mary Theresa	Episode: "Schmoopie's Big Adventure"
2021	American Horror Story: Double Feature	Trooper Jan Remy	Episode: "Winter Kills"
2023	9-1-1: Lone Star	Patty	Episode: "Control Freaks"
2023	Killing It	Jackie Boone	5 episodes
2024	Beyond Belief: Fact or Fiction	Nancy	Episode: "The Gate to Hell/Bad Omen/Car with a Conscience/Lost and Found/The Ghosts of Versailles"
2026	The Shards	Jan 'Butch' Banxxx	

=== Stage ===
Year	Title	Role	Notes
2017	Our Town	Mrs. Louella Soames	Pasadena Playhouse
2020	Rock of Ages	Dennis Dupree (Replacement)	New World Stages, Off-Broadway
2024	Highway Patrol	Nan	Goodman Theatre
