= All About the Money =

- Directed by: Blake Freeman
- Written by: Blake Freeman
- Story by: Danny West; Lester Korman; Jamie Starr; Blake Freeman
- Produced by: Danielle R. Crane; Shane Duffy; Kaity Nielson; Timothy C. O'Mara; Ethan Peskowitz; Missy Valdez; Casper Van Dien
- Starring: Eddie Griffin; Casper Van Dien; Danny Trejo; Jon Gries
- Cinematography: Ryan Purvis
- Edited by: Dan Packer
- Music by: Ryan Perez-Daple
- Production companies: Wunderkind Pictures; Planet Rocks
- Distributed by: Gravitas Ventures
- Release date: June 2, 2017
- Running time: 90 minutes
- Country: United States
- Language: English

All About the Money (also titled Mucho Dinero) is a 2017 American action comedy film directed by Blake Freeman and starring Eddie Griffin, Casper Van Dien, Danny Trejo, Jon Gries and Freeman.

== Plot ==
In 1986, three best friend are planning their future. They return a "lost" cat which they had stolen to the neighbor lady for a $40 reward. Fast forward thirty years and find Vince is living on Chris's couch. He is selling vacuum cleaners door to door and must just quit. Chris works at a car repair garage. His wife comes to the shop and demands that he signs the divorce papers. He tells her he will sign if her rich sugar daddy boyfriend pays him. He quits his job. Kurt works for his rich wife's father and is freaked out over a big presentation. He blows the presentation, is fired and has a nervous breakdown.

All three friends are jobless. Vince sees a newspaper article offering a $25 million reward for the capture of a drug lord. Using Kurt's wife's credit card, they buy first class tickets to South America. They land in Colombia thinking it’s Mexico. Kurt likes the cocaine drug life but is captured by Diego who wants to kill the gringo. Cartel boss Garcia likes Kurt's money saving ideas on drug distribution through Canada. Kurt falls for Garcia's daughter, Maria.

Chris and Vince have to find a way to rescue Kurt and capture Garcia for the reward money. They find a crazy burnt out American special ops soldier to train them in guerrilla war tactics. John Waters dresses in his underwear and just seems never to die.

The Colombian Army is planning an assault on the Garcia mansion at the same time as Waters and his two trained Americans are ready. An assault commences on the complex with lots of explosions, gun fire, and killings. Kurt escapes, Maria is killed and the drug lord is captured.

There is a television news account of the Colombia cartel raid with the result of a new cartel leader named Kurt Pomeroy. His two friends surround him with many beautiful women. They hear of an American reward for an Afghanistan terrorist and the stage is set for a sequel.

== Cast ==
- Eddie Griffin as Christopher 'Chris' Jefferson Johnson
- Blake Freeman (also director) as Vincent 'Vince' Bolero
- Casper Van Dien as Kurt Pomeroy
- Stephen Stanton as Narrator voice over
- Danny Trejo as Luis Diego - Drug Enforcer
- Jon Gries as John Waters - Guerrilla soldier
- Jose Yenque as Juan Armando Garcia - Colombian Drug Cartel Kingpin
- Ashley Thomas as Maria Garcia - Juan's daughter
- Aja Brown as Blanca - Maria's Bodyguard
- Carlos Sanz as Felix Santos - Mexican druglord
- Josh Cruz as Colombian General Andreas
- Jaidyn Triplett as Reggie
