= Patty Guggenheim =

American actress and comedian

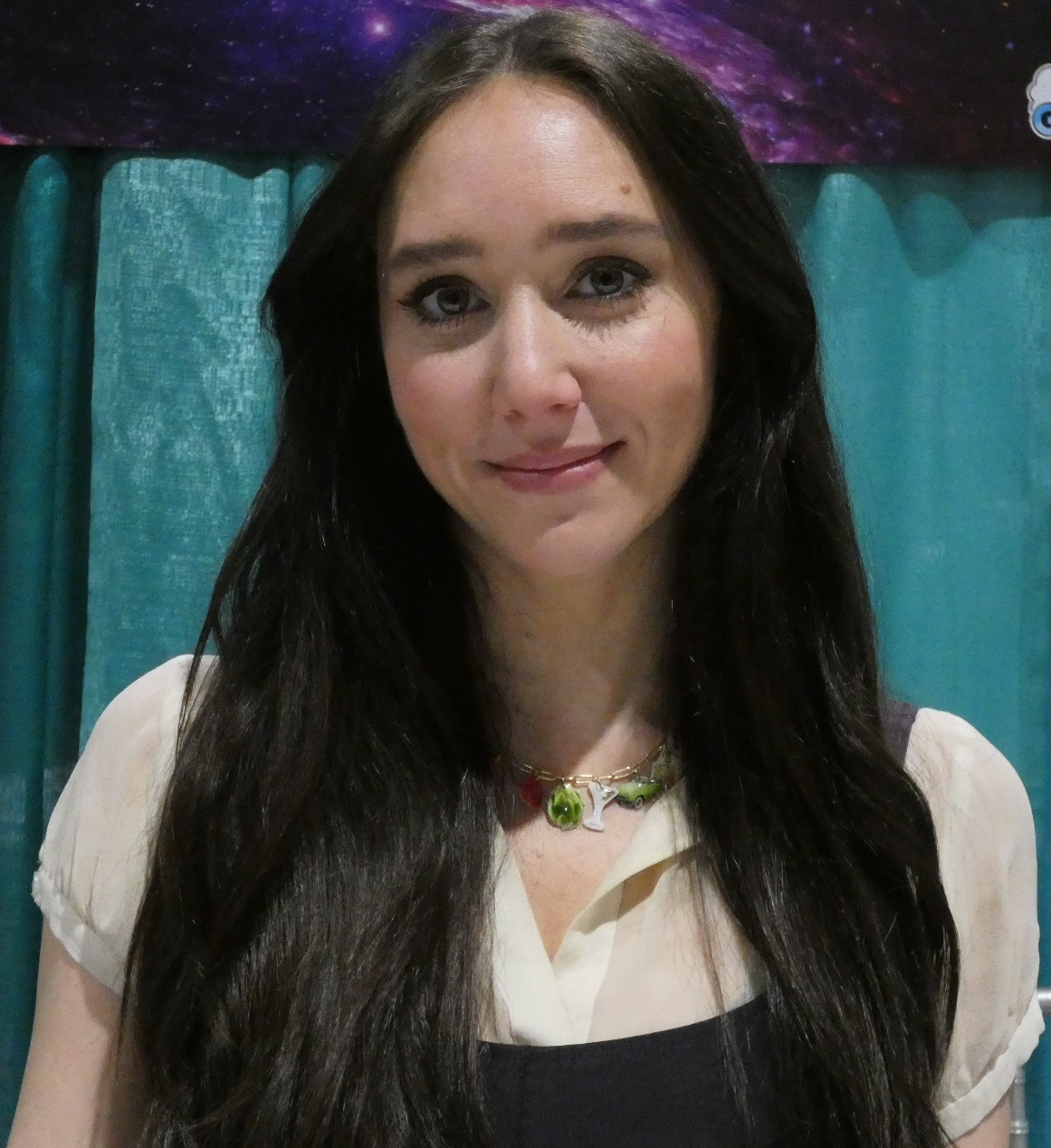
- Guggenheim in 2025
- Born: February 4, 1984 (age 42)
- Occupations: Actress; comedian
- Years active: 2005–present

Patty Guggenheim (born February 4, 1984) is an American actress and comedian. She is known for her roles as Madisynn King in the Disney+ series She-Hulk: Attorney at Law and Raven in the second season of the Peacock series Twisted Metal.

== Early life and education ==
Guggenheim grew up in Indianapolis, Indiana. She is one of two children born to John and Ann Guggenheim.

== Career ==
As a comedian Guggenheim was part of The Groundlings comedy troupe main company. She appeared on Curb Your Enthusiasm in 2021. She has had guest-starring roles on Reno 911!, Mr. Mayor, Superstore, The Middle, Modern Family, and Splitting Up Together. She had a regular role on Pop TV’s comedy series Florida Girls and MTV’s Mary+Jane. Guggenheim also wrote for and acted in Barely Famous and additionally, voiced Patty Mime on SuperMansion.

Guggenheim appeared in 2022 in She-Hulk: Attorney at Law on Disney+, portraying Madisynn King, a party girl and unwitting magician’s assistant who forms an unlikely friendship with Wong, portrayed by Benedict Wong. The character became a fan favourite and calls have been made for Guggenheim and Wong to have their own spin-off show, or a spin-off show for Guggenheim with Jameela Jamil who plays Titania on the series. Florida Girls and She-Hulk: Attorney at Law director Kat Coiro commented that Guggenheim and Wong’s riffing on subjects such as The Sopranos and cocktails was improvised and un-scripted, with Coiro quoted as saying "That came purely from the actors' comedic chemistry and us going, 'We've got to throw some cameras on these two because they're so funny." Coiro also commented on how frequently she has worked with Guggenheim, and why, saying "I do not go anywhere without that woman. She is a comedic genius.. she came in and auditioned for us, and everybody [watching that audition] was actually crying with laughter. Tears streaming down their faces." Guggenheim's performance was praised for having ‘a quiet brilliance’ and ‘Guggenheim’s Madisynn was one of the first truly contemporary characters to enter the MCU in a while — someone who for better or worse felt real’ by TVLine who awarded Guggenheim TVLine Performer of the Week.

In 2025, Guggenheim had a recurring role as Raven in the second season of the Peacock action comedy series Twisted Metal.

== Personal life ==
Guggenheim told the media she lives in the old apartment of fellow MCU actor Chris Hemsworth in Los Angeles and still occasionally receives his mail at the address. She is a graduate of North Central High School and Indiana University Bloomington.

== Filmography ==
=== Film ===
Year	Title	Role	Notes
2011	Brick Novax's Diary	Beautrax 7	Credited as Patricia Guggenheim
2012	Casa de mi padre	Band Member #2	Credited as Patricia Guggenheim
2015	Never Have I Ever	Friend	Short
2017	Billz	Karina	Short
2018	Half Magic	Women's Empowerment Groupie	Uncredited
2018	The Happytime Murders	Roxy	Voice
2018	Take One	Crackhead Princess	Short
2018	Kenny	Nurse Tanya	Short
2019	The Blackout	Bianca	
2020	Film Fest	Allison	
2022	Stroke of Luck	Natasha	
2022	Skivvies	Model	Short
2022	It's a Wonderful Binge	Delray Donna	
2022	The Devil's Daughters	Krystal	Short
2023	The Donor Party	Sharon	
2024	Prom Dates	Woman at Fountain	
2025	Don't Tell Larry	Susan	

=== Television ===
Year	Title	Role	Notes
2005–2007	The Showbiz Show with David Spade	David's Daughter	Voice only
2008	Web Therapy	Bryn	3 episodes
2008–2010	Carpet Bros	Patty	3 episodes; credited as Patricia Guggenheim
2010–2011	Funny or Die Presents	Sophia Loren Michaels-Novax	4 episodes
2011	Web Therapy	Bryn	2 episodes
2014	The Tiffany and Erin Show	Bestie 2	2 episodes
2014–2017	Tosh.0	Various	5 episodes
2015	2 Broke Girls	Vape Girl	Episode: "And the Crime Ring"
2015	Command Center	Frenemy	Miniseries
2015	The Spoils Before Dying	Red LaLane	2 episodes; miniseries
2015	Shaded	Cindy, Wife, Rhonda Lyon	4 episodes
2015	Rough Day	Melissa	
2016	The Middle	Whitney	Episode: "The Rush"
2016	Sorry, Ari	Kelly	Episode: "Karen's Friends"
2016	Barely Famous	Nanny	Episode: "Death of a Relationship"
2016	Mary + Jane	Tanya Westford	2 episodes
2017–2019	Mike Tyson Mysteries	Megan Von Bryer, Cassie, Brianna, Puneet (voice)	4 episodes
2018	The 2018 Rose Parade Hosted by Cord & Tish	Jennifer	TV movie
2018	Nobodies	Becca	Episode: "Page One Rewrite"
2018	LA to Vegas	Talia	Episode: "The Dinner Party"
2018	Ghost Story Club	Bunker Survivor	Episode: "The Restaurant from Hell"
2018	Splitting Up Together	Meegan	2 episodes
2018–2019	The News Tank	Pammy Gooblebind	2 episodes
2018–2021	Liza on Demand	Shiva, Whitney	3 episodes
2019	Modern Family	Danielle	Episode: "SuperShowerBabyBowl
2019	SuperMansion	Patty Mime	6 episodes
2019	Florida Girls	Erica	Main role
2020	Superstore	Kelci	Episode: "Customer Safari"
2020–2022	Reno 911!	Bride, Bachelorette #1	2 episodes
2021	Mr. Mayor	Samanthee	Episode: "#PalmTreeReform"
2021	Curb Your Enthusiasm	Gina	Episode: "The Mini Bar"
2022	She-Hulk: Attorney at Law	Madisynn	Episode: "Is This Not Real Magic?"
2023	iCarly	Tinsley	4 episodes
2023	Killing It	Tiffany	Episode: "Help Me Pay My Bills"
2024	The Spiderwick Chronicles	Stacy Varnow	2 episodes
2025	Matlock	Kelsey	2 episodes
2025	Big City Greens	Additional voices	
2025	Twisted Metal	Raven	8 episodes
2026	The Hawk	Olivia Floyd	3 episodes
2026	The Paper	Cynthia	Episode: "Duelling Pencils"
