= Laura Chinn =

American actor and screenwriter (born 1986)

- Born: March 24, 1986 (age 40); La Crescenta-Montrose, California, U.S.
- Education: Dunedin High School
- Occupations: Actress; screenwriter
- Years active: 2009–present

Laura Chinn (born March 24, 1986) is an actress and writer for television. She wrote and directed the feature film Suncoast (2024). Chinn also starred in and created the Pop television series Florida Girls (2019).

== Personal life ==
A native of La Crescenta-Montrose, California, Chinn is one of three children born to a Caucasian mother, Susan Peckenham, and an African-American father, Wesley James Chinn. Her parents are divorced. She was raised as a Scientologist, growing up in Clearwater, Florida with her mother and Burbank, California with her father. Chinn attended Dunedin High School in Florida before dropping out at age 15. Her brother Max died of a brain tumor in 2005, at age 22.

== Filmography ==
=== As writer ===
- Catherine & Annie (2009; short film)
- Fairly Criminal (2010; short film)
- Father-Son Chat with Alan Thicke (2012; short film)
- Job Interview with Renee Zellweger (2012; short film)
- Animal Practice (2012; 1 episode)
- Childrens Hospital (2013; 1 episode)
- Growing Up Fisher (2014; 2 episodes)
- Grandfathered (2015-2016; 21 episodes)
- Brad Neely's Harg Nallin' Sclopio Peepio (2016; 10 episodes)
- The Mick (2017-2018; 3 episodes) – also producer
- Florida Girls (2019; creator) – also executive producer
- Suncoast (2024; feature film) – also director

=== As television actress ===
Year	Title	Role	Notes
2007	Shark	Anna Daltion	1 episode
2007	Grey's Anatomy	Jamie	1 episode
2008	My Name Is Earl	Skyler	1 episode
2009	Catherine & Annie	Catherine	TV short
2009	Hawthorne	Camille Hawthorne (uncredited)	1 episode
2010	General Hospital	Chelsea	2 episodes
2010	Lie to Me	Michelle Daly	1 episode
2011	NTSF:SD:SUV::	Mitzi (uncredited)	1 episode
2011	I Hate L.A.	Scarlet	1 episode
2012	Happy Endings	Karissa	1 episode
2013	The New Normal	Amy	1 episode
2013	Childrens Hospital	Patient #1	1 episode
2014	UCB Comedy Originals	Unknown	1 episode
2014	Growing Up Fisher	Sylvia	1 episode
2015	Pitiful Creatures	Student #3	1 episode
2016	Young & Hungry	Monica	1 episode
2016	My Time Your Time	Raina	TV movie
2018	The Mick	Dispatch (voice)	1 episode
2019	Florida Girls	Shelby	Series regular

=== As film actress ===
Year	Title	Role	Notes
2010	The Dead Undead	Megan	
2010	Fairly Criminal	Arianna	Short film
2011	The Adjustment Bureau	Lora (uncredited)	
2011	Warrior	KC	
2012	Charity Case	Anne	Short film
2012	Job Interview with Renee Zellweger	Unknown	Short film
2015	Playing Doctor	Carol	Short film
2015	Your Hands	Ruby	Short film
