= Heathers (TV series) =

American black comedy television series

- Genre: Black comedy
- Created by: Jason Micallef
- Based on: Heathers by Daniel Waters
- Starring: Grace Victoria Cox; Melanie Field; James Scully; Brendan Scannell; Jasmine Mathews
- Composer: Chris Alan Lee
- Country of origin: United States
- Original language: English
- No. of seasons: 1
- No. of episodes: 10

Production
- Executive producers: Jason Micallef; Annie Mebane; Gary Lucchesi; Bradley Gardner; Josh McGuire; Trevor Engelson; Leslye Headland (pilot)
- Producers: Keith Raskin; Kenneth Silverstein; Linda Morel
- Cinematography: Adam Silver; David McGrory
- Camera setup: Single-camera
- Running time: 32–42 minutes
- Production companies: Gyre & Gimble Productions; Underground Films; Lakeshore Entertainment

Original release
- Network: HBO Europe; Paramount Network
- Release: July 11 – July 18, 2018

Heathers is an American black comedy television series, created by Jason Micallef, that premiered on October 25, 2018, on Paramount Network. A modern-day reboot of the 1989 film of the same name written by Daniel Waters, it stars Grace Victoria Cox, James Scully, Melanie Field, Brendan Scannell and Jasmine Mathews. The series follows high school student Veronica Sawyer and her conflicts with a self-titled clique consisting of three fellow students who share the name Heather. The series was intended to be an anthology, with each season taking place in an entirely different setting from the original film.

The series was originally in development for TV Land, but it was moved to the 2018 launch slate for its rebranded sister network Paramount Network, with a premiere scheduled for March 2018. In the wake of the Stoneman Douglas High School shooting and the program's subject matter, Paramount Network delayed the premiere to July 2018. However, on June 1, 2018, Paramount Network's parent company Viacom dropped Heathers entirely due to continued concern for its content following the 2018 Santa Fe High School shooting two weeks prior.

Despite the premiere's cancellation in the United States, the series had already been sold in international markets where it went on to debut as previously scheduled in its original ten-episode version. It aired for the first time on July 11, 2018, on HBO Europe in select European territories.

On October 4, 2018, it was announced that the series would premiere in United States on October 25, 2018, on Paramount Network over the course of five nights. The series was edited for content by the network resulting in numerous cuts and the number of episodes being reduced from 10 to nine, with the original final two episodes being combined into one.

Despite reports by the writers that a second season, Heathers: Revolution, had a complete script, Paramount Network's president Kent Alterman announced in an interview on May 1, 2019, that Heathers had been canceled.

== Premise ==
In the town of Sherwood, Ohio, Veronica Sawyer (Grace Victoria Cox) is the newest member of the most powerful clique at Westerberg High School, "the Heathers"; Heather Chandler (Melanie Field), a rich girl who is fairly famous on social media for her social justice posts, and her "sidekicks" Heather Duke (Brendan Scannell) and Heather McNamara (Jasmine Mathews). Veronica has a deep-seated jealousy of the Heathers, a jealousy that turns into hatred towards Heather Chandler and the status quo she maintains. One day, Veronica is confronted with the realization that, unlike her classmates, she has no real sense of individuality and is destined to be forgotten. Joined by a jaded and aloof transfer student named Jason "J.D." Dean (James Scully), Veronica hopes to make her way through her senior year with all of her morals intact.

== Cast and characters ==
=== Main ===
- Grace Victoria Cox as Veronica Sawyer, a self-described "good person" who is really a cold-hearted psychopath who struggles with her sense of identity and is a part of the most popular clique of Westerberg.
  - Maisie de Krassel portrays a young Veronica
- Melanie Field as Heather Chandler, the social justice warrior leader of the most popular clique of Westerberg's senior class and the queen bee of the school. She has gained major traction on a number of social media platforms.
  - Emma Shannon portrays a young Heather in the episode "Reindeer Games"
- James Scully as Jason "JD" Dean, Veronica's love interest and a new student at Westerburg with the tendency to wax poetic about the adolescent experience.
  - Maverick Thompson portrays a young JD
- Brendan Scannell as Heather Duke, a member of the Heathers who identifies as genderqueer. They are Heather Chandler's second-in-command and do not hesitate to talk down to whomever they view as lesser than them.
  - Jack R. Lewis portrays a young Heather in the episode "Do I Look Like Mother Teresa?"
- Jasmine Mathews as Heather McNamara, a biracial girl who identified as a lesbian but, after being exposed for having an affair with an adult faculty member, is outed as bisexual and becomes a social pariah. She seems to be the most naive and timid member of the Heathers with an underlying transphobia problem.

=== Recurring ===
- Deanna Cheng as Pauline Fleming, Westerberg's driven guidance counselor
- Drew Droege as Maurice Dennis, Westerberg's melodramatic art teacher
- Kurt Fuller as Principal Gowan, the principal of Westerburg High School
- Travis Schuldt as Coach Cox, Westerberg's football coach
- Nikki SooHoo as Betty Finn, Veronica's childhood best friend, who secretly wants to be just as popular as her
  - Ella Gross portrays a young Betty
- Cameron Gellman as Kurt Kelly, the quarterback of the Westerburg High School football team who is secretly dating Heather Duke
- Mandy June Turpin as Mrs. Sawyer, Veronica's oblivious mother
- Wallace Langham as Kevin Sawyer, Veronica's oblivious father
- Rebecca Wisocky as Martha Chandler, Heather Chandler's mother and a former stage actress who does not believe that her daughter has any talent
- Jamie Kaler as Big Bud Dean, JD's father and the owner of Big Bud Oil and Gas, an oil and gas company
- Matthew Rocheleau as David Waters, a Westerburg teacher who has an affair with Heather McNamara
- Brett Cooper as Brianna Parker/"Trailer Parker", a poor student at Westerburg High who is bullied due to her social class
- Jesse Leigh as Peter Dawson, Class President of Westerburg High School, a gossip, and a member of the "Gay Nerds"
- Romel De Silva as Kyle, one of Peter's best friends who is obsessed with the Heathers and is a member of the "Gay Nerds"
- Adwin Brown as Seth, a member of the "Gay Nerds"
- Jeremy Culhane as Dylen Lutz, a lovable loser who is picked on by most of the student body
- Christina Burdette as Jesus Julie, a religious student who is friends with Betty and Shelby
- Annalisa Cochrane as Shelby Dunnstock, a ditzy cheerleader who is one of Betty Finn's friends and is constantly undermined by the Heathers
- Sophia Grosso as Driffany Tompkins, a Westerburg student
- Allyn Morse as Annie, a Westerburg student
- Paige Weldon as Lily, a Westerburg student

=== Guest ===
- Cayden Boyd as Ram Sweeney, the best friend of Kurt Kelly and another member of the Westerburg High School football team
- Karen Maruyama as Mrs. Finn, Betty's mother
- Birgundi Baker as Lizzy, a new student at Westerburg High, who was raised in the foster care system and is eager to learn the ways of Heather Chandler
- Reece Caddell as Lucy McCord, a childhood friend of Veronica and Betty who was murdered by Veronica with a croquet mallet
- Jen Zaborowski as Mrs. Zaborowski, a Westerburg teacher
- Joel Spence as Mr. Chandler, Heather Chandler's father
- Lilli Birdsell as Mrs. McNamara, Heather McNamara's mother
- Phil LaMarr as Mr. McNamara, Heather McNamara's father
- April Bowlby as Teyna, Big Bud Dean's girlfriend
- Salma Khan as Amita, an influencer
- James Kirkland as a disc jockey at Betty's party and the prom
- Vic Chao as Mr. Finn, Betty's father
- Casey Wilson as Lexi Anne, a news anchor
- Evan Crooks as Jacob, Veronica's hook up at the art exhibit
- Michael D. Roberts as Captain Lehman
- Mo Gaffney as Margie Kane
- Josh Fadem as Dathan
- Jeannetta Arnette as Mrs. Kelly
- Larry Poindexter as Mr. Kelly
- Jen Caldwell as Cathy Ishmael
- Camille Hyde as Rebecca

=== Special guest-star ===
- Selma Blair as Jade Duke, Heather Duke's step-mother, a stripper and menthol smoker who's biding her time until her 82-year-old husband dies
- Shannen Doherty as Mrs. Dean, JD's mom who committed suicide when he was just a child. Doherty played Heather Duke in the original 1989 film.
  - Doherty also appears as Dr. Destiny during a hallucination in the episode "Reindeer Games"

== Episodes ==
No.	Title	Directed by	Written by	Original release date	U.S. viewers (millions)
1	"Pilot"	Leslye Headland	Jason Micallef	(Europe) July 11, 2018 (United States) October 25, 2018 (Note: Premiered early online through iTunes and numerous cable video on demand services on February 20, 2018. Television premiere originally scheduled for March 7, 2018, before being rescheduled, pulled, and then ultimately set for October 25, 2018. The entire season was also released on Paramount Network application and website on October 22, 2018.)	0.156
Wealthy, beautiful Veronica Sawyer has recently joined the Heathers, a clique of very popular girls at Westerburg High School who all share the same name. While at a party, Veronica calls Heather Chandler a "fatty" during a fit of rage. An angry Heather promises to ruin Veronica's social life the next day at school. Later that evening, Veronica meets up with JD, who is new at her school and wants to help Veronica. The pair break into Heather Chandler's room and plan to take a picture of her wearing a Nazi hat, so they can post it on Heather's social media. However, Heather wakes up before they have a chance to post the picture and quickly figures out what is happening. JD tricks Heather into swallowing a pill which he tells Veronica will induce vomiting. The pill, however, seemingly kills Heather. Veronica and JD quickly post a fake suicide message on Heather's social media and flee the scene. The next morning Heather's suicide note has gone viral. A flashback to earlier that morning, however, reveals that Heather Chandler survived and is still alive.
2	"She's Going to Cry"	Leslye Headland	Price Peterson & Jason Micallef	(Europe) July 11, 2018 (United States) October 25, 2018	0.090
Revealing herself to have survived, Heather Chandler blackmails Veronica and JD into glamorizing her death before she returns to school. Heather McNamara is shunned by Heather Duke and the other students after getting caught having sex with a teacher. The school faculty ignores her account of the event, the teacher blames her for getting fired from the school, and her parents unhelpfully try to talk to her about suicide. Her final straw is being rejected by Chandler after she makes her dramatic reappearance at a party. Devastated and realizing she has no one to turn to, McNamara slits her wrists with a glass shard and goes back to the party, but no one notices the blood coming from her arms. She returns home and dies from blood loss near her distracted and oblivious parents.
3	"Date Rapes and AIDS Jokes"	Leslye Headland	Annie Mebane & Jason Micallef	(Europe) July 11, 2018 (United States) October 26, 2018	0.070
Veronica feels immense regret for not being able to prevent Heather McNamara's suicide. She is angry at JD for not attending McNamara's funeral and goes on a date with Ram Sweeney, which she believes she had done to make JD jealous. Later, Ram takes her to a secluded area for another date, but JD follows and kills him, framing his death as a suicide. After a brief confrontation, JD and Veronica profess their love for each other and kiss. Meanwhile, Heather Duke is caught dating Kurt Kelly by Heather Chandler, which is against her rules. She not only forces Duke to publicly break up with Kurt but also replaces Duke's position in the clique with a new student, Lizzy. Chandler auditions for the lead in the school play but is overshadowed by Lizzy, much to her dismay.
4	"Our Love Is God"	Sydney Freeland	Lily Sparks & Jason Micallef	(Europe) July 18, 2018 (United States) October 26, 2018	0.068
Veronica's former best friend since childhood, Betty Finn, suspects Veronica to be responsible for the death of their old friend Lucy McCord, the victim of "The Croquet Killer" who was found dead during a croquet game. JD attempts to kill Betty to keep her silent, but she manages to escape and call the police. While Veronica drives JD away, he does not give her all the details of the situation, unaware that Veronica was following him while he chased Betty. Meanwhile, Heather Chandler's attempt to gain popularity from her attempted suicide is thwarted when a new student, Brianna Parker, unsuccessfully attempts suicide. Heather Duke tries to remove Lizzy from the clique by forging a love note from Ram to make it look like she was responsible for Ram's "suicide", but it inadvertently makes Lizzy more popular among the students.
5	"Reindeer Games"	Adam Silver	Jessica Wood & Jason Micallef	(Europe) July 18, 2018 (United States) October 27, 2018	0.141
At the police station, JD is let off scot-free as Veronica lies to defend him. As JD plants a bomb near the school statue, a strange number texts him an incriminating video of him. Believing it to have come from Heather Chandler to threaten him into removing Lizzy, he plants a gun onto Lizzy, causing her to be expelled from the school. However, a second message proved they were not coming from Chandler. JD returns to the school a few minutes before the bomb is set to explode and finds a note from Veronica, stating how she was disappointed in him for thinking she was an ordinary girl, revealing that Betty's suspicion was correct and she did indeed kill Lucy McCord when she was a child. She lambasts JD for not trusting her and says that he needed to pay for being a liar. The bomb explodes not near the school, but in JD's car. Veronica appears behind the rubble and drives away.
6	"Hot Probs"	Gregg Araki	Carey O'Donnell & Jason Micallef	(Europe) July 18, 2018 (United States) October 27, 2018	0.094
JD ends up in a mental facility with Veronica watching over him. In his restrained state, JD learns of Veronica's true nature; she is cold-hearted and wants to be treated as an equal partner by JD, not just following orders. Despite apologizing to Veronica, she still believes that he is lying and does not trust her, and goes home to pretend to commit suicide. When JD finds her hanging body, he laments the devastating loss of Veronica, causing her to reveal her death was fake and finally fully trust JD. At school, Heather Duke gains newfound popularity after joining the school's news show, while Heather Chandler embarrasses herself in the school play.
7	"Do I Look Like Mother Theresa?"	Gregg Araki	Matt McConkey & Jason Micallef	(Europe) July 18, 2018 (United States) N/A (Note: The seventh and eighth episodes of the series were originally scheduled to air on October 28, 2018, but were pulled from broadcast following the Pittsburgh synagogue shooting. They had previously been made available to stream through Paramount Network's website and app on October 22, 2018.)	N/A
On the date of Heather McNamara's birthday, Veronica and Duke go to a bar where they find the teacher that had sex with McNamara coercing another girl into a similar situation. Wanting to avenge McNamara's death, Veronica and JD kill the teacher, framing his death as a suicide. They also write in his suicide note that he was the murderer of Lucy McCord, in order to deflect the blame off of Veronica. Meanwhile, Chandler has an epiphany that she needed to become a better person. She begins by apologizing to all the people she bullied, and even becomes friends with Brianna Parker. However, she cannot yet forgive Duke for overtaking her power.
8	"Call Us When the Shuttle Lands"	Jessica Lowrey	Daniel Brier & Jason Micallef	(Europe) July 18, 2018 (United States) N/A	N/A
In response to the recent string of suicides and assaults, Westerburg High holds an active shooter drill. Heather Chandler, Heather Duke, and Veronica are locked alone together in a room, where they end up sorting through their issues and become friends again. Veronica's secret of killing Lucy McCord is accidentally revealed to Chandler and Duke, but they agree to keep it secret. Meanwhile, JD follows the rest of the students and cynically watches the teachers explain what to do in a lockdown. While Veronica plans to go to prom, JD refuses, and he begins to make a plan.
9	"I'm a No-Rust-Build-Up Man Myself"	Kate Dennis	Ryan Sandoval & Jason Micallef	(Europe) July 18, 2018 (United States) October 29, 2018	0.068
Kurt Kelly witnesses JD acting suspiciously at school after hours, so JD kills him and frames his death as a suicide. Veronica is predicted to be prom queen, which causes Heather Chandler to try to cancel the prom, but JD goads Heather Duke into reinstating the prom. Duke realizes that JD was responsible for killing Kurt from the unusual suicide note, and after a car chase, Duke accidentally runs into barbed wire and bleeds to death. JD yet again frames Duke's death as a suicide. After Veronica learns of JD's involvement in Duke's death and of Chandler only caring of becoming prom queen, she parts ways with both of them.
10	"Are We Going to Prom or Hell?"	Leslye Headland	Jason Micallef	(Europe) July 18, 2018 (United States) N/A (Note: Content from the tenth episode of the series was edited into episode nine for its premiere in the United States. Internationally, episodes nine and ten were broadcast in their original form.)	N/A
JD moves forward with his plan to blow up the prom. Veronica initially intervenes, but changes her mind and goads JD into moving forward. When they learn that a shooting has taken place at another school's prom, JD fears being overshadowed and attempts to stop his explosion from happening. Veronica realizes JD has no interest in changing the world, only in achieving fame for his actions. JD pulls a gun on her. Both end up fatally shot. Dylen comes upon their bodies and runs to tell the faculty, who ignore him because they are busy throwing Heather Chandler out due to her skirt length. Outside, as Chandler is yelling at the adults, the school explodes. Chandler attempts to gain attention for being the sole survivor, but is only acknowledged by the media as being "Veronica's friend", much to her ire. In the afterlife, everyone who died is in white at a prom in Heaven getting along and happy. Veronica and JD still look the way they did when they died, and cannot get anyone to see or hear them, and also cannot see or hear each other. The two end up locked out of Heaven and are alone forever as punishment for all the murders they have done. In the final scene, a woman from the 18th century is seen holding a bloodied knife, revealing the title of the potential second season, Heathers: Revolution.

== Production ==
=== Development ===
The reason I changed the Heathers surface identities is I think today [the characterization] rings true. Today, all different types of people are more aspirational. People that wouldn't have necessarily been considered the most popular kids in school in 1988 could very well be — and probably most likely are — the more popular kids today. And also because it's a TV show, we have so much more time to explore their characters and get behind it. Of course, no one's seen the show yet. Once they see it, I think they'll get what we're talking about.

— Creator/showrunner Jason Micallef about the radical change of the cast in the series.

On August 27, 2009, Sony Pictures Television announced that Heathers was to be adapted for television to air on Fox. Mark Rizzo was hired to write the series, and Jenny Bicks was to co-produce with Lakeshore Entertainment. The program was described as a modernized version of the original story, and all characters from the film were expected to be scripted into the adaptation.

On September 12, 2012, it was announced that the television network Bravo would begin developing a Heathers reboot unrelated to the earlier announcement by Sony Pictures Television. The storyline was to pick up twenty years after the events of the film when Veronica returns home to Sherwood, Ohio with her teenage daughter, who had to contend with the next generation of mean girls, all named "Ashley". They were to all be the daughters of the two surviving Heathers. Neither Ryder nor Slater were attached to the project. In August 2013, Bravo declined to order the series.

On January 13, 2017, TV Land ordered a newly developed iteration of the series, described as an anthology dark comedy set in the present day. The series was set to be written by Jason Micallef and Tom Rosenberg, with Gary Lucchesi serving as an executive producer for Lakeshore Entertainment. On January 13, 2017, Heathers was ordered to series at TV Land.

On March 16, 2017, it was reported that the series would move to Paramount Network, a planned rebranding of TV Land's sister network Spike. On June 1, 2018, however, it was announced that Paramount Network had dropped the series due to concerns over its content in the wake of recent school shootings in the United States. It was reported that the series' producers had begun to shop the series to other broadcasters, and that writing for a potential second season had neared completion, which would take place in an entirely different setting than the first season and original film. By July 16, 2018, it was reported that both Netflix and Freeform had passed on the series. On October 4, 2018, it was announced that Viacom and Paramount Network had reversed their decision on the series and that, following various edits and a reduction in episode count from 10 to 9, the series would premiere on the cable network on October 25, 2018.

=== Casting ===
On October 11, 2016, it was announced that James Scully and Grace Victoria Cox had been cast in the male and female leads J.D. and Veronica. Later that month, Melanie Field, Brendan Scannell, and Jasmine Mathews joined the main cast as the titular "Heathers" (Heather Chandler, Heather Duke, and Heather McNamara, respectively). On November 22, 2016, it was announced that original film cast member Shannen Doherty had been cast as a pivotal character in the series' pilot episode. It was later reported that she is set to appear in three of the first season's episodes in total. On June 23, 2017, Birgundi Baker and Cameron Gellman signed onto the series in the recurring roles of Lizzy and Kurt, respectively. On July 6, 2017, it was reported that Selma Blair had been cast in the recurring role of Jade, "the gold-digging stepmother to Heather Duke" who is described as "a stripper menthol smoker who is rough around the edges, but with a bit of glamour to her."

=== Filming ===
In November 2016, the series' pilot began production in Los Angeles, California. Principal photography for the rest of the first season took place from spring through fall of 2017 in the Chatsworth area of Los Angeles. Locations utilized for filming included the Rancho San Antonio which is being used to portray Westerburg High School.

== Release ==
Promotional poster featuring Veronica Sawyer (Grace Victoria Cox) and Jason "JD" Dean (James Scully).

=== Marketing ===
On August 28, 2017, the Paramount Network released a teaser trailer for the series alongside a series of posters, each depicting a different character. On February 18, 2018, the first official trailer for the series was released. Beginning on February 12, 2018, a series of promotional posters, each depicting a different character, were released. On October 23, 2018, a clip from the series featuring Selma Blair as her character Jade was released. A day later, a second clip was released and a day after that a third clip was released as well.

=== Premiere ===
The series was initially set to debut on March 7, 2018. However, on February 28, 2018, it was announced that the premiere would be delayed in light of the Stoneman Douglas High School shooting. Paramount Network released a statement explaining their decision saying, "Paramount Network's original series Heathers is a satirical comedy that takes creative risks in dealing with many of society's most challenging subjects ranging from personal identity to race and socio-economic status to gun violence. While we stand firmly behind the show, in light of the recent tragic events in Florida and out of respect for the victims, their families and loved ones, we feel the right thing to do is delay the premiere until later this year." On March 14, 2018, Viacom suspended programming across all of its networks, including Paramount Network, for 17 minutes due to its support of student-led protests and campaigns that emerged in the wake of the Stoneman Douglas shootings.

On May 1, 2018, it was announced that the series would officially premiere on Paramount Network on July 10, 2018. On June 1, 2018, it was reported that Paramount Network had dropped the series entirely, and that it would be shopped to other networks. Viacom executives became increasingly uncomfortable with airing the program due to its themes; another major school shooting, the 2018 Santa Fe High School shooting, had occurred in May 2018. Keith Cox, the network's president of development, noted that the pilot had been filmed "before the climate changed", and that "the combination of a high school show with these very dark moments didn't feel right".

On October 4, 2018, it was reported that the series would premiere on October 25, 2018, on Paramount Network over the course of five nights. The series was edited for content by the network resulting in numerous cuts or changes including the removal of a scene in the finale where Westerburg High School is blown-up and the altering of a scene in episode 5 that featured a first-person video game with teachers holding guns. Ultimately, the edits resulted in the number of episodes being reduced from 10 to 9, with the Paramount Network's dedicated application and website on October 22, 2018. Following the premiere of the final episode on October 29, 2018, a Heathers-themed episode of Lip Sync Battle was slated to air featured guests including Melanie Field and Brendan Scannell.

Following the Pittsburgh synagogue shooting on October 27, 2018, Paramount Network decided to pull episodes seven and eight from their schedule and declined to broadcast them on television. The two episodes had previously been made available on Paramount Network's official website and application on October 22, 2018. The ninth and final episode ultimately aired on October 29, 2018, as originally scheduled.

=== Distribution ===
Though Paramount Network had pulled the series, the production companies involved with the show had already sold the series' international broadcast rights. The series airs on HBO Europe in Bosnia and Herzegovina, Bulgaria, Croatia, Czech Republic, Hungary, Kosovo, Macedonia, Moldova, Montenegro, Poland, Romania, Serbia, Slovakia and Slovenia. It started airing twice a week on July 11, 2018, on HBO Europe streaming service with a weekly run airing on television beginning in September in those territories. Additionally, HBO Europe subscribers in Denmark, Finland, Norway and Sweden started getting episodes twice a week on the streaming service on July 11, 2018. Subscribers in Spain and Andorra got the first three episodes on HBO Europe streaming service on the same date, with the remaining installments dropping on July 18, 2018. Additionally, HBO Europe subscribers in Portugal, Angola, Cape Verde, Guinea, Bissau, Mozambique, São Tomé and Príncipe begin streaming the series on a future date. Digiturk licensed the series in Turkey and Cyprus for premium subscribers with weekly episodes launching July 20, 2018. In Greece, OTE began broadcasting one episode a week starting on July 15, 2018. In Iceland, Síminn's video-on-demand service began streaming the series on July 12, 2018. In Australia, every episode of the series launched on September 28, 2018, on Stan. In the United Kingdom, the series was available in its original 10 episodes version on StarzPlay.

=== Soundtracks ===
Coinciding with the American premiere of the series, Lakeshore Records released two soundtracks for the series. On October 12, 2018, Lakeshore released Heathers - Original Television Series Soundtrack featuring songs from the series by various artists including DJ Shadow, Poison, and Peggy Lee. A limited vinyl edition was released in Urban Outfitters stores on January 25, 2019. On October 19, 2018, Lakeshore released Heathers - Original Television Series Score consisting of the show's original score composed by Chris Alan Lee.

All music is composed by Chris Alan Lee.

Heathers: Original Score by Chris Alan Lee
No.	Title	Length
1.	"Heather Chandler Is Looking for You" (dialogue, featuring Brendan Scannell)	0:07
2.	"Viral Casualty"	2:42
3.	"What the Queef Is This?"	2:38
4.	"American Carousel of Tragedy"	1:59
5.	"Dear Diary"	0:44
6.	"Discount Hobgoblins"	0:51
7.	"Heather Is Back"	1:03
8.	"I Am Suicide"	1:40
9.	"Jade Can You Not Smoke Your Whore Cigarettes"	0:33
10.	"What's Your Damage?"	1:27
11.	"You Always Had to Be Blue"	1:12
12.	"Butcher's Bridge"	2:06
13.	"You Have the Political Beliefs of a Dorm Room Poster"	0:58
14.	"This Is Lizzy OMG U Never Buy Me Anything"	0:37
15.	"Total Bootcut Jean"	1:34
16.	"You're a Dinner Roll. A Side Salad"	0:58
17.	"Heather? We're Okay. Right"	1:47
18.	"It's Always Been Veronica"	1:18
19.	"JD's Alibi"	2:26
20.	"The Pent Up Rage of an Overachiever"	3:09
21.	"Tag Is for Little Girls, Betty"	1:49
22.	"Dentist Trip"	2:06
23.	"Moby Dick"	2:08
24.	"JD vs. Heather C"	2:07
25.	"JD vs. Veronica"	1:49
26.	"Kissing Betty"	1:47
27.	"In the Clear for Now"	2:16
28.	"Heather vs. Heather"	1:40
29.	"She Needs a Mani not a Pedo"	2:21
30.	"The Royal Murder"	1:59
31.	"Heaven & Hell"	2:24
32.	"Oops. 911"	2:19
33.	"The Devil's Jizz"	2:02
34.	"Human Red Flag"	3:02
35.	"Coming for You" (featuring Anna Dellaria)	0:19
36.	"Lemmings Lament" (featuring Melanie Field)	2:36
37.	"Heaven Is a Place on Earth" (featuring Brendan Scannell, Melanie Field & Birgundi Baker)	1:56
Total length:		01:04:28

Heathers: A Paramount Network Original Series Soundtrack
No.	Title	Artist(s)	Length
1.	"Coming for You"	Anna Dellaria	0:19
2.	"Que Sera, Sera"	Pink Martini	4:05
3.	"Nobody Speak"	DJ Shadow	3:15
4.	"Hold On"	Wilson Phillips	4:23
5.	"Hand Clapping Song (Josh Mobley Remix)"	The Meters	1:27
6.	"I'm Happy"	Bury the Wren	3:35
7.	"Every Rose Has Its Thorn"	Poison	4:18
8.	"Tomboy"	Princess Nokia	3:36
9.	"Destroy Everything You Touch"	Ladytron	4:36
10.	"I Think We're Alone Now"	Tiffany	3:46
11.	"GO!"	Santigold	3:22
12.	"Is That All There Is?"	Peggy Lee	4:19
Total length:			41:15

== Reception ==
The series received mixed-to-negative reviews from critics and fans alike on both the initial release of the pilot episode and the official premiere of the series. On the review aggregation website Rotten Tomatoes, the series holds a 30% approval rating with an average rating of 5.38 out of 10 based on 23 reviews. The website's critical consensus reads, "Despite promising performers, Heathers' aspirational angst is let down by its blunt, misguided attempts at social commentary." Metacritic, which uses a weighted average, assigned the series a score of 40 out of 100 based on 9 critics, indicating "mixed to average reviews."

In a negative review, Daniel Fienberg of The Hollywood Reporter described the series as "a pale imitation" of the 1989 film, and went on to say that, "Having the high school tyranny associated with a gang of students who, in a different era, might have been marginalized produces a dark and almost reactionary undercurrent in which the disenfranchised aren't being bullied, but rather are wielding identity politics and political correctness as weapons". Leigh Monson of Birth.Movies.Death was similarly negative saying that she saw in the show's dynamics "a longing for the good old days when non-whites and queers knew their place." Monson concluded, "Heathers is a hateful, bigoted exercise in regression hiding behind the guise of dark comedy, and I can only hope it doesn't gain the Trumpian audience it so clearly craves." Samantha Allen of The Daily Beast panned the series saying, "If you believe that kids these days are fragile "snowflakes," that political correctness is running amok, and that LGBT people are now society's true bullies, this new Heathers is the show for you. The premiere of the rebooted cult classic, now airing for free online, takes place in a universe—clearly a fictional one—where the football team is oppressed and yesteryear's fat, queer, and black victims now rule the school with manicured fists. The show feels like it was written for aging Fox News viewers who get angry about people's gender pronouns—which is odd because it's clearly being marketed to a young and, therefore, progressive-leaning audience who may not remember the ... original."
