= Laci Mosley =

American actress and comedian (born 1991)

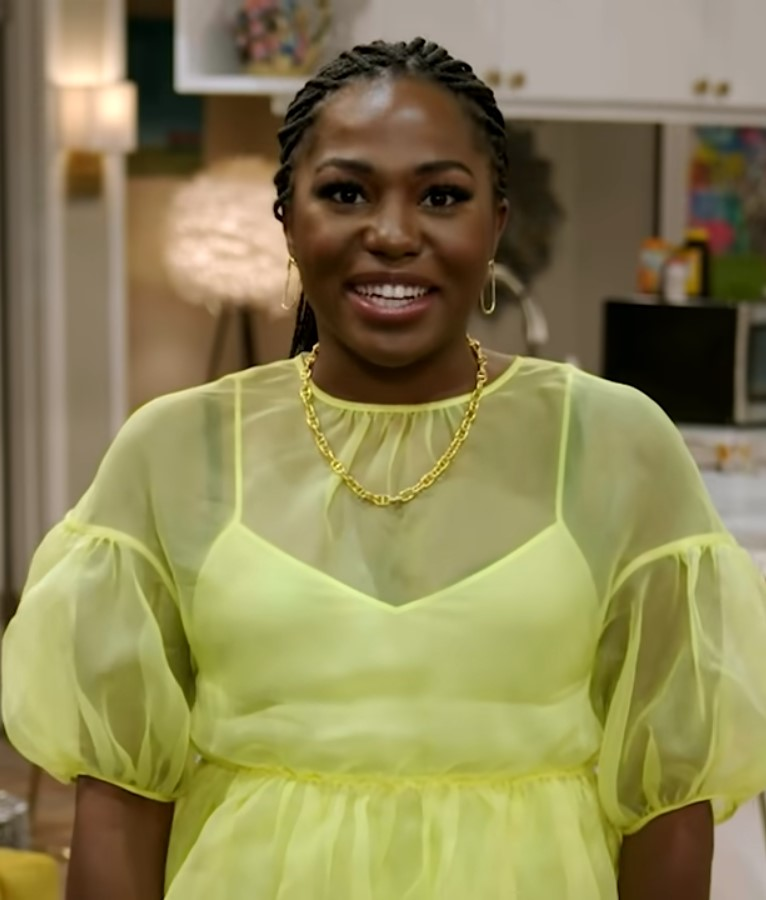
- Mosley in June 2021
- Born: Laci Risë Mosley; July 4, 1991 (age 35); Terrell, Texas, United States
- Education: University of Pittsburgh
- Occupations: Actor; comedian; podcaster
- Years active: 2014–present
- Known for: A Black Lady Sketch Show iCarly (2021)
- Notable work: Scam Goddess

Laci Risë Mosley (born July 4, 1991) is an American actor, comedian, and podcaster. She performs improv comedy at UCB Los Angeles and co-starred in the Pop comedy series Florida Girls. Mosley is best known for her podcast Scam Goddess, which focuses on historical and contemporary scams. She was also a cast member on A Black Lady Sketch Show, Lopez vs Lopez, and the iCarly revival series. From 2025 to 2026, Mosley starred in the Fox sitcom Going Dutch. Since 2025, she has been host of the television adaptation of Scam Goddess.

== Career ==
=== Acting and comedy ===
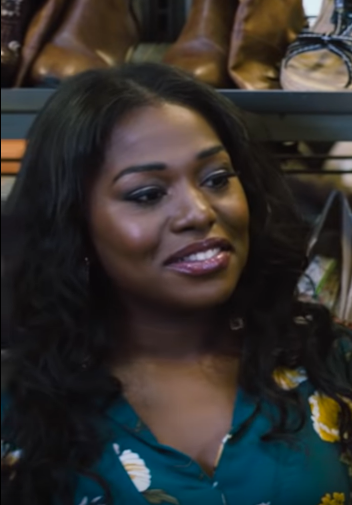
Mosley in 2018 on the game show Thrift Haul

Mosley's first lead acting role was on the 2019 Pop series Florida Girls, which was cancelled after one season despite an initial renewal. She has also acted in supporting roles on Single Parents, Insecure, and The Wedding Year. She starred in the digital series Scroll Wheel of Time on Eko.

Mosley provides commentary on Whoopi Goldberg's ABC true crime series The Con.

In 2021, she joined the main cast of A Black Lady Sketch Show's second season. That year, she was also cast in the main role of Harper in the iCarly revival. After the announcement of her casting, Mosley was the target of racist attacks from fans of the original series. Writers and other cast members of the revival defended her online.

Mosley performs improv and sketch comedy at UCB in Los Angeles, including a show called #TrapProv with her comedy partner Priscilla Davies. She is a member of UCB's Project Rethink initiative that started in 2020 and works to address systemic racism within the organization.

Mosley has appeared as a panelist on five episodes of the NPR news quiz Wait Wait... Don't Tell Me!

In March 2022 it was announced that she would not return for season three of A Black Lady Sketch Show due to scheduling conflicts. In April, she was cast in a recurring role in the NBC comedy series Lopez vs Lopez.

In 2025, Mosley was a main cast member on Fox comedy Going Dutch. The show was renewed for a second season which premiered in 2026.

=== Scam Goddess ===
In September 2019, Mosley created the podcast Scam Goddess, produced by Earwolf, where she discusses historic and modern cons with other comedian guests. The name comes from a moniker given to her by the hosts of The Daily Zeitgeist podcast due to her frequent internet research on scam and fraud cases. Topics covered include the Fyre Festival and Hilaria Baldwin's Spanish identity claims. In October 2020, the podcast was picked up for co-production by Conan O'Brien's company Team Coco, alongside Earwolf.

The podcast was recommended by Vox and Vulture. Sean Malin of Vulture wrote in positive review, "Mosley is whip-fast with jokes, upstaging and amusing even her funniest guests with zingers." Mosley received two Webby Awards and twoiHeartRadio Podcast Awards for Scam Goddess.

Mosley wrote a memoir titled Scam Goddess: Lessons from a Life of Cons, Grifts, and Schemes, released in September 2024.

In July 2024 it was announced that Scam Goddess would be adapted for television by ABC News. The television series premiered on January 16, 2025, on Freeform.

== Personal life ==
Mosley was born in Terrell, Texas, and raised in Dallas. She went to Liberty High School in Frisco, Texas, and was involved with several campus groups.

She is a graduate of the University of Pittsburgh. Upon graduating, she lived in New York City for two years then moved to Los Angeles to pursue acting.

Mosley is bisexual.

== Filmography ==
=== Television ===
Year	Title	Role	Notes	Ref.
2014	History Detectives	Mollie Smith		
2015	First Dates	Jamie		
2017	I Want My Phone Back	Studio Audience	4 episodes	
2018	Insecure	Black Woman	1 episode; uncredited	
2019	Florida Girls	Jayla	Main role	
2019–2020	Single Parents	Sharon	Recurring role	
2020	Better Call Saul	Honeydew	1 episode	
2021	A Black Lady Sketch Show	Various Characters	Main role	
2021–2023	iCarly	Harper Bettancourt	Main role, 33 episodes	
2022	Kenan	Rachelle	1 episode	
2022–2023	Lopez vs Lopez	Brookie	Recurring role	
2022	Little Demon	Various voices	5 episodes	
2022	Sherman's Showcase	Rhonda	1 episode	
2025–26	Going Dutch	Dana Conway	Series regular	
2025	Scam Goddess	Herself (host)	Also consulting producer; adaptation of podcast	
2025	Krapopolis	Nike (voice)	Episode: "Nike (The Goddness)"	
2026	Very Important People	Paloma	Episode: "Paloma"	
TBA	Scroll Wheel of Time	Queen Kouchy	Main role	

=== Film ===
Year	Title	Role	Notes	Ref.
2019	007:Diva Cup	Bond Girl	Short	
2019	The Wedding Year	Violet		
2023	The Out-Laws	Marisol		
2024	Halfrican American	Dezz	Short	

== Awards and nominations ==
Year	Award	Category	Nominee(s)	Result	Ref.
2021	Webby Awards	Crime & Justice Podcast	Scam Goddess	Won	
2022	iHeartRadio Podcast Awards	Best Crime Podcast	Scam Goddess	Won	
2022	Webby Awards	Crime & Justice Podcast	Scam Goddess	Won	
2024	iHeartRadio Podcast Awards	Best Overall Host	Scam Goddess	Won	
2024	Ambies	Best Performance in Audio Fiction	Yes We Cannabis	Won	
2024	Kids' Choice Awards	Favorite Female TV Star – Family Show	iCarly	Nominated	
