= Scam Goddess (TV series) =

American true crime documentary series

- Genre: Documentary
- Starring: Laci Mosley
- Music by: Vanacore Music
- Country of origin: United States
- Original language: English
- No. of seasons: 1
- No. of episodes: 6

Production
- Executive producers: John Henshaw; Carrie Cook; David Sloan; Eli Holzman; Aaron Saidman; Maura Mitchell; Shea Spencer
- Editors: Eric Torres; Karin Hoving
- Production companies: ABC News Studios; The Intellectual Property Corporation

Original release
- Network: Freeform
- Release: January 15 – February 19, 2025

Scam Goddess is a true crime documentary series based on the podcast of the same name. The series premiered on January 15, 2025, on Freeform.

== Episodes ==
| No. | Title | Scammer(s) | Original release date | U.S. viewers (millions) |
|---|---|---|---|---|
| 1 | "The Horseplay Heist" | Rita Crundwell | January 15, 2025 | N/A |
| 2 | "The Sideline Scammer" | Peggy Ann Fulford | January 22, 2025 | N/A |
| 3 | "The Gig City Grift" | Kyle Sandler | January 29, 2025 | N/A |
| 4 | "The Holy Hustle" | Lamor Whitehead | February 5, 2025 | N/A |
| 5 | "The Coin Conspiracy" | Ross Hansen & Diane Erdmann | February 12, 2025 | N/A |
| 6 | "The Royal Racket" | Daryl Harrison | February 19, 2025 | N/A |

== Production ==
On July 2, 2024, it was announced that the Scam Goddess podcast would be adapted into a television series. On December 6, 2024, it was announced that the series would premiere on January 15, 2025, on Freeform.
