= Hauntology (film) =

2024 American horror movie by Parker Brennon

- Directed by: Parker Brennon
- Written by: Parker Brennon
- Music by: Jonathan Snipes
- Release date: 2024
- Running time: 105 minutes
- Country: United States
- Language: English

Hauntology is a 2024 American adventure horror thriller film directed and written by Parker Brennon in their feature-length debut and starring Jaidyn Triplett, Samantha Russell, Naomi Grossman, and Samantha Robinson. Hauntology had its world premiere at Dances With Films, on June 29, 2024, in Los Angeles.

== Plot summary ==
12-year-old Venus (played by Jaidyn Triplett) is leaving home because of problems with her parents. Her sister, Jazmin (played by Samantha Russell), soon finds her and tries to persuade her to return home. To convince Venus, Jazmin offers to share some stories about their hometown. One by one, Jazmin tells her stories, and with each tale, things become increasingly strange.

== Cast ==
- Samantha Robinson as Christina
- Nancy Kyes as Josephine Cashel
- Naomi Grossman as Annalisa Drouais
- Zoey Luna as Julian Cashel
- Jaidyn Triplett as Venus Price
- Kurt Oberhaus as Shane
- Abigail Esmena as Jade
- Annie Fitzpatrick as Francine Boxell
