= Is This Not Real Magic? =

- She-Hulk: Attorney at Law episode
- Patty Guggenheim received praise for her performance as Madisynn King (L) in the episode, particularly for her chemistry with Benedict Wong as Wong (R).
- Episode no.: Episode 4
- Directed by: Kat Coiro
- Written by: Melissa Hunter
- Cinematography by: Florian Ballhaus
- Editing by: Jamie Gross
- Original release date: September 8, 2022
- Running time: 36 minutes

Cast
- Patty Guggenheim as Madisynn King; Leon Lamar as Cornelius P. Willows; Ryan Powers as Alan; Mike Benitz as Hank Sanderson; David Otunga as Derek; Michel Curiel as Arthur

Episode chronology
← Previous "The People vs. Emil Blonsky"	Next → "Mean, Green, and Straight Poured into These Jeans"

"Is This Not Real Magic?" is the fourth episode of the American television series She-Hulk: Attorney at Law, based on Marvel Comics featuring the character She-Hulk. It follows lawyer Jennifer Walters / She-Hulk as she tries to begin dating. The episode is set in the Marvel Cinematic Universe (MCU), sharing continuity with the films of the franchise. It was written by Melissa Hunter and directed by Kat Coiro.

Tatiana Maslany stars as Walters, alongside Jameela Jamil, Ginger Gonzaga, Jon Bass, Mark Linn-Baker, Rhys Coiro, and Benedict Wong. Kat Coiro joined the series by September 2020 to direct the majority of the series' episodes.

"Is This Not Real Magic?" was released on Disney+ on September 8, 2022. It received mostly positive reviews, with critics praising Wong's character, particularly his relationship with Madisynn, the episode's writing, characterization, and its action sequences. Patty Guggenheim's performance as Madisynn made her the breakout character of She-Hulk: Attorney at Law.

== Plot ==
Donny Blaze, a magician who was expelled from Kamar-Taj for unethical use of the Mystic Arts and now works as an entertainer at the Mystic Castle, sends an audience member named Madisynn King to another dimension during one of his shows; unaware of what's happening, Madisynn is compelled to make a deal with a demon before being transported back to her own dimension, arriving in Wong's home in Kamar-Taj. Wong then contacts Jennifer Walters and explains that he wishes to file suit, recognizing that Blaze has violated a core tenet of his training: never use the Mystic Arts for personal gain or without proper safeguards.

Realizing that she has an opportunity to help set a new legal precedent, Walters takes the case against Blaze and Mystic Castle's curator Cornelius P. Willow and persuades a judge to declare that Blaze cannot practice the Mystic Arts without permission from the Sorcerer Supreme. Meanwhile, Walters creates a profile on a dating app in the hopes of expanding her social life but soon finds that she can only get men to pay attention to her profile when she presents herself as She-Hulk. Blaze accidentally unleashes a swarm of demons at one of his shows, but Wong and Walters are able to deal with the creatures, and Walters threatens Blaze and Willow into complying with a cease-and-desist order. The next day, Walters learns that Titania, having just been released from jail, is filing a lawsuit claiming that Walters' use of the name "She-Hulk" is trademark infringement.

== Production ==
=== Development ===
In August 2019, Marvel Studios announced that She-Hulk: Attorney at Law was being developed for the streaming service Disney+. In September 2020, Kat Coiro was hired to direct six episodes, including the fourth, and to executive produce the series. When the series was originally being developed in the writers' room, the plot revolving around Jennifer Walters' origin was intended for the fourth episode, before ultimately appearing in the first episode of the series. Executive producers include Marvel Studios' Kevin Feige, Louis D'Esposito, Victoria Alonso, and Brad Winderbaum, in addition to Coiro and head writer Jessica Gao. The fourth episode, titled "Is This Not Real Magic?", was written by Melissa Hunter, and was released on Disney+ on September 8, 2022.

=== Writing ===
Gao wanted the show to be sex-positive, and wanted to explore Walters' dating life following her transformation into She-Hulk, noting that both Walters and She-Hulk would be attracted to different types of men and that they would be treated differently as a result. She felt that "having the rug pulled out from under" Walters after spending the night with a date as She-Hulk and having him not be interested in Walters the next morning "would just be so devastating". The audience spends the episode believing he is the "perfect date" along with Walters that when "the cold hard truth of reality hits and it's so terrible for her that your heart really breaks for her". Gao felt Maslany's performance in the scene was nuanced and helped improve the quality of the scene.

Gao enjoyed portraying Wong in the episode discovering Western pop culture and felt the juxtaposition of him and Madisynn was "so magical because he's a serious guy, and he's paired with this polar opposite". Madisynn, who became the series' breakout character, only appears in this episode. Gao explained that the season was written before actress Patty Guggenheim was cast, and had she known Guggenheim would be in the role, the character would have appeared more in the series. Guggenheim appreciated the writers having formed Madisynn's personality, such as how she spells her name and referring to Wong as "Wongers", before she was cast, as it gave her a clear idea of who she was as a person. The episode established Nikki Ramos as being queer. Actress Ginger Gonzaga felt that it was important her sexuality was established and additionally described Ramos as someone who "already knows who she is and what she'll love, and she doesn't have any boundaries or hold herself back. She doesn't have any rules for herself". She also felt that Ramos was encouraging Walters to "embrace her uniqueness and her different-ness".

=== Casting ===
The episode stars Tatiana Maslany as Jennifer Walters / She-Hulk, Jameela Jamil as Titania, Ginger Gonzaga as Nikki Ramos, Jon Bass as Todd, Mark Linn-Baker as Morris Walters, Rhys Coiro as Donny Blaze, and Benedict Wong as Wong. Also appearing are Patty Guggenheim as Madisynn King, Leon Lamar as Cornelius P. Willows, Ryan Powers as Alan, Mike Benitz as Hank Sanderson, David Otunga as Derek, and Michel Curiel as Arthur. News anchors Amanda Salas and Bob DeCastro appear as themselves.

=== Filming and visual effects ===
Filming occurred at Trilith Studios in Atlanta, Georgia, with Kat Coiro directing the episode, and Florian Ballhaus serving as cinematographer. Rhys Coiro worked with a technical advisor and on-set magician to learn sleight-of-hand magic for the role, which Coiro felt was a good juxtaposition to the magic from Kamar-Taj. He also worked with the stunt team when creating the floating sequence and other scenes featuring magic, and felt the "spontaneous moments" they discovered through their preparation and were done during filming that made the episode were "very satisfying", such as the tricks of the Wong pulling the ball out of his mouth and the rabbit appearing in the court room. Lamar improvised and was given many of his lines from Kat Coiro during filming as they were not scripted beforehand. The mid-credits scene with Madisynn and Wong discussion their favorite alcoholic drinks was not originally scripted, with Kat Coiro stating it came about because of the actors' "comedic chemistry" and the creative team deciding to "throw some cameras on" them to capture their material. Additional material where the two discussed brunch "for about 30 minutes" was also filmed for consideration to use in the mid-credits.

Visual effects for the series were created by Digital Domain, Wētā FX, Trixter, Wylie Co., Cantina Creative, FuseFX, SDFX Studios, Capital T, Keep Me Posted, Soho VFX, and Lightstage.

=== Music ===
Series composer Amie Doherty enjoyed creating a theme for Blaze, and was able to combine his theme with her main She-Hulk theme when the two characters were interacting, such as during their fight at the end of the episode. The following songs are featured in the episode: "Woke Up This Morning (Chosen One Mix)" by Alabama 3, "Again" by Marlee XX, "Vortex" by Stolen Nova, "Blades of Glory" by HLM, "Zoom" by Jessi, "Unordinary Love" by Chris Love, "I Love You" by Siddhartha Khosla, "Sidelines" by Cole Simon, and "Heaven Is a Place on Earth" by Belinda Carlisle.

== Marketing ==
A QR code was included in the episode that allowed viewers to access a free digital copy of West Coast Avengers Annual #4. After the episode's release, Marvel announced merchandise inspired by the episode as part of its weekly "Marvel Must Haves" promotion for each episode of the series, including a Wong Funko Pop, a She-Hulk dog chew toy, She-Hulk and Abomination apparel, and a She-Hulk sticker.

== Reception ==
=== Viewership ===
According to market research company Parrot Analytics, which looks at consumer engagement in consumer research, streaming, downloads, and on social media, She-Hulk: Attorney at Law dropped one spot to No. 3 on the digital originals U.S. rankings for the week ending September 9, 2022. The series experienced an 8.4% decrease in demand expressions during the week of its fourth episode, leaving it with 35.5 times the demand of an average series. In the breakout show ranking for the same week, which tracks the most in-demand series that have premiered in the past 100 days, the series had 32 times the average series demand, competing with major new releases like House of the Dragon and The Lord of the Rings: The Rings of Power. Nielsen Media Research, which records streaming viewership on U.S. television screens, She-Hulk: Attorney at Law was the fifth-most watched original series across streaming services for the week of September 5–11, 2022, with 493 million minutes watched, a 4% increase from the previous week. The streaming aggregator Reelgood, which monitors real-time data from 5 million users in the U.S. for original and acquired streaming programs and movies across subscription video-on-demand (SVOD) and ad-supported video-on-demand (AVOD) services, reported that it was the ninth most-streamed program overall for the week ending September 9, 2022. Whip Media, which tracks viewership data for the more than 21 million worldwide users of its TV Time app, calculated that She-Hulk: Attorney at Law was the second most-streamed original series in the U.S. for the week ending September 11, 2022.

=== Critical response ===
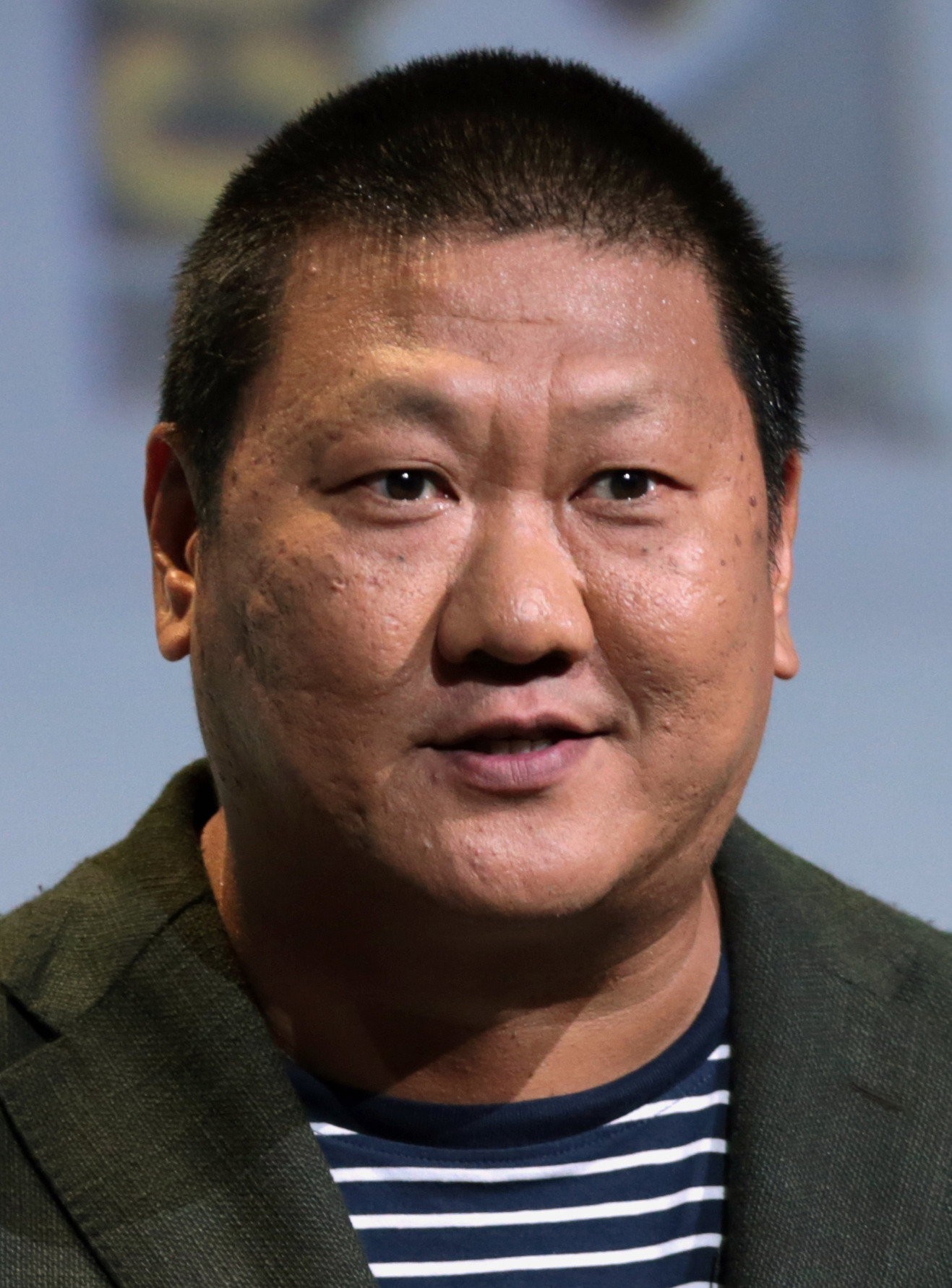
Critics praised Benedict Wong's character in the episode and his chemistry with Patty Guggenheim's Madisynn.

The review aggregator website Rotten Tomatoes reports an 87% approval rating with an average rating of 7.40/10, based on 119 reviews. The site's critical consensus reads, "'Is This Not Real Magic?' pulls off a neat trick by solidifying She-Hulk's narrative momentum while being a delightfully self-contained lark."

IGN's Ameila Emberwing gave the episode a 9 out of 10, and said "head writer Jessica Gao and her team did a perfect job crafting the ideal mid-season scenario without needing to play off a hiatus" while enjoying that the series felt like a television series and not a "six-hour movie". Emberwing also enjoyed the action of the episode and felt the series' "greatest asset continues to be its balance. It's loud, proud, and female-centric while still bringing fun cameos, plenty of MCU tie-ins, and lots of street-level superhero shenanigans." Alec Bojalad at Den of Geek said She-Hulk: Attorney at Law was "truly like nothing else Marvel has ever produced" and that "Is This Not Real Magic?" "finally achieves the serene self-actualization of Maximum Goof" for the series since it was "essentially a live-action cartoon". Giving the episode 4 stars out of 5, he felt the it was "both the show's funniest half hour yet and the most complete example that it knows what it wants to be", but did note when the series features action, it struggled more than when it was in the courtroom. He also thought Walters dating was the "least sturdy portions" of the episode.

In her review for The A.V. Club, Saloni Gajjar said "Is This Not Real Magic?" was the series' "most facetious outing" that "embraces the show's silly legal comedy side over its superhero side", giving it a "B+". She was disappointed that the episode made her care more about Madisynn than Ramos, and hoped the remaining episodes would expand on her bond with Walters to avoid the "Token Woman of Color Best Friend trope". Arezou Amin from Collider gave the episode an "A–" saying, "Unlike previous weeks, this one feels the most like an episode of a conventional legal comedy, with an A, B, and C story all neatly interwoven and, for the most part, contained entirely to this episode." However, she found it difficult to believe a person who looked like Maslany would not get many dates. From The Ringer, Daniel Chin praised the episode's exploration of Wong, enjoying the writing for his character, which he felt humanized Wong and introduced him as a relatable character. He also enjoyed the episode's action sequence with him and She-Hulk, calling it "one of the more entertaining and chaotic sequences of the series so far". However, he said the overarching plot of the series was "murky at best, reinforcing concerns over whether the show's abundance of cameos is eclipsing the star it's meant to introduce".

Guggenheim received praise for her performance in the episode, particularly for the friendship Madisynn had with Wong. Meredith Loftus, also from Collider, said, "What could've been just a throwaway event to get the plot moving for the episode is the start of a beautiful friendship", with Madisynn bringing Wong "out of his stoic nature to enjoy the material world in a way that his Avenger allies don't often engage in".

David Opie of Digital Spy felt the reveal of Ramos being queer was the latest example of a MCU project doing "the bare minimum when it comes to LGBTQ+ representation". He said Ramos' line of "'hetero life is grim' doesn't really cut it when it comes to powerful LGBTQ+ storytelling", and though Gonzaga believed it was an important moment for more queer representation, Opie felt, "if Nikki isn't given the freedom to explore her bisexuality later on in any meaningful way, then what was the point of all this?"

=== Accolades ===
Guggenheim was named TVLine's "Performer of the Week" for the week of September 5, 2022, for her performance in this episode. The site said she "made the party girl hilariously specific with the rhythm of her speech and intonations" and highlighted her courtroom scene, before concluding "Guggenheim's Madisynn was one of the first truly contemporary characters to enter the MCU in a while—someone who for better or worse felt real, and not carefully injection-molded to serve a rote purpose. She's not a scientist nor a doctor nor a superpowered being. She's just a girl from Florida content to share popcorn and a This Is Us binge with her Wongers."

Guggenheim also received praise on many publications' year-end lists for 2022. Entertainment Weekly felt she had one of the best performances of 2022, with Sydney Bucksbaum being impressed with Guggenheim's "perpetually drunk party girl" holding her own against the other acting performances of the series, becoming "an instant fan-favorite". Decider and Inverse named Guggenheim one of 2022's "top scene stealers", with Brett White of Decider calling her "the breakout character of the year" for the MCU, which "hasn't been the same since", and was hopeful for a spin-off series with Madisynn and Wong. Inverse's Jake Kleinman noted Madisynn "earned her place in the MCU with her first line of dialogue". ComicBook.com also nominated Guggenheim for their 2022 Golden Issue Award for Best First TV Appearance.
