= I Want My Phone Back =

- Genre: Game show
- Created by: Luke Kelly-Clyne
- Directed by: Laura Terruso; Morgan Evans
- Presented by: Alana Johnston
- Starring: Blake Rosier; Inessa Frantowski; Brandon Gardner; Laci Mosely; Kausar Mohammed; Oscar Montoya
- Country of origin: United States
- Original language: English
- No. of seasons: 3
- No. of episodes: 30

Production
- Executive producers: Spencer Griffin; Luke Kelly-Clyne; Shane Rahmani; Jon Cohen; Sam Reich; Clinton Trucks
- Camera setup: Multi-camera
- Running time: 9–14 minutes
- Production companies: Big Breakfast; CollegeHumor

Original release
- Network: Comcast Watchable (Season 1); Facebook Watch (Season 2–3)
- Release: November 2, 2016 – January 24, 2018

I Want My Phone Back is an American game show web series that premiered on November 2, 2016, on Comcast Watchable. In 2017, it was subsequently picked up by Facebook Watch where it has since aired two seasons.

The series was created by Luke Kelly-Clyne and is hosted by Alana Johnston. The show's team of improvisers include Blake Rosier, Inessa Frantowski, Brandon Gardner, Laci Mosley, Kausar Mohammed, and Oscar Montoya.

== Premise ==
I Want My Phone Back follows host "Alana Johnston and a cast of improv performers take to the streets of Los Angeles, giving passersby the chance to win up to $1,000 — by handing over their mobile phones and letting the show’s pranksters post to social media, and text and call their contacts. The longer contestants stay in the game, the more money they make."

== Production ==
=== Development ===
The series originated as a short video entitled I Want My Phone Back: The Scariest Game Show Ever that was produced by Big Breakfast for CollegeHumor and initially released on YouTube on November 13, 2015. The short was created by Luke Kelly-Clyne, directed by Todd G. Bieber, and featured Brandon Gardner as host.

The video proved to be quite successful on CollegeHumor's YouTube channel where it quickly earned a million views. After testing how the idea could be turned into a 30-minute TV show or 10-minute web series, the series was sold to streaming service Comcast Watchable.

On August 22, 2016, it was announced that the short had been developed into a series and that Comcast Watchable had ordered a first season consisting of ten episodes. It premiered on November 2, 2016.

In September 2017, it was reported that Comcast was reassessing their Watchable platform and planning to de-emphasize over-the-top distribution, and halt future work centered on Watchable originals including I Want My Phone Back.

=== Move to Facebook Watch ===
In mid-2017, it was announced that the series had been picked up for two new seasons by Facebook Watch. The first of those ten episode seasons premiered on August 29, 2017.

== Episodes ==
Season	Episodes	Originally released		
Season	Episodes	First released	Last released	Network
1	10	November 2, 2016	December 5, 2016	Comcast Watchable
2	10	August 29, 2017	October 25, 2017	Facebook Watch
3	10	November 22, 2017	January 24, 2018	Facebook Watch

=== Season 1 (2016) ===
No. overall	No. in season	Title	Original release date
1	1	"The Shoppers"	November 2, 2016
2	2	"The Fanatics"	November 2, 2016
3	3	"The Stars"	November 2, 2016
4	4	"The Hipsters"	November 2, 2016
5	5	"The Nightowls"	December 5, 2016
6	6	"The Explorers"	December 5, 2016
7	7	"The Professionals"	December 5, 2016
8	8	"The Athletes"	December 5, 2016
9	9	"The Weekenders"	December 5, 2016
10	10	"The Thinkers"	December 5, 2016

=== Season 2 (2017) ===
No. overall	No. in season	Title	Original release date
11	1	"Bother of the Bride"	August 29, 2017
12	2	"Meat Your Maker"	August 29, 2017
13	3	"Heart Before the Horse"	September 13, 2017
14	4	"Guilt Trip"	September 20, 2017
15	5	"Family Assets"	September 27, 2017
16	6	"The More the Merrier"	October 4, 2017
17	7	"Let's Get Physical"	October 11, 2017
18	8	"Creeper Peeper"	October 21, 2017
19	9	"Come One Come All"	October 18, 2017
20	10	"Solo Artist"	October 25, 2017

=== Season 3 (2017-18) ===
No. overall	No. in season	Title	Original release date
21	1	"High Class Problems"	November 22, 2017
22	2	"Muscle, Muscle Man"	November 29, 2017
23	3	"No Drama Spared"	December 6, 2017
24	4	"Mom's the Word"	December 13, 2017
25	5	"Father Knows Best"	December 20, 2017
26	6	"Business Casualties"	December 27, 2017
27	7	"Trash Phone"	January 3, 2018
28	8	"The Proof is in the Plumbing"	January 10, 2018
29	9	"A Spoonful of Sugar Daddy"	January 17, 2018
30	10	"Lovitz or Leave It"	January 24, 2018

== Reception ==
=== Viewers ===
Since launching on Facebook Watch on August 29, 2017, I Want My Phone Back has accumulated more than 370,000 followers. By January 2018, the show's reach topped 12 million. In addition, the show ranks seventh in overall engagement, its interaction rate stands at 9%, and 11% of all followers like, share or comment on content.

=== Awards and nominations ===
The series was included in Paste Magazine's list of the 10 Best Comedy Web Series in 2016.

Year	Ceremony	Category	Recipient(s)	Result	Ref.
2018	22nd Annual Webby Awards	Film & Video: Variety	I Want My Phone Back	Nominated	
2018	39th Annual Telly Awards	Online: General - Variety	I Want My Phone Back	Bronze Winner	
