= ICarly (2021 TV series) =

American comedy television series (2021–2023)

iCarly
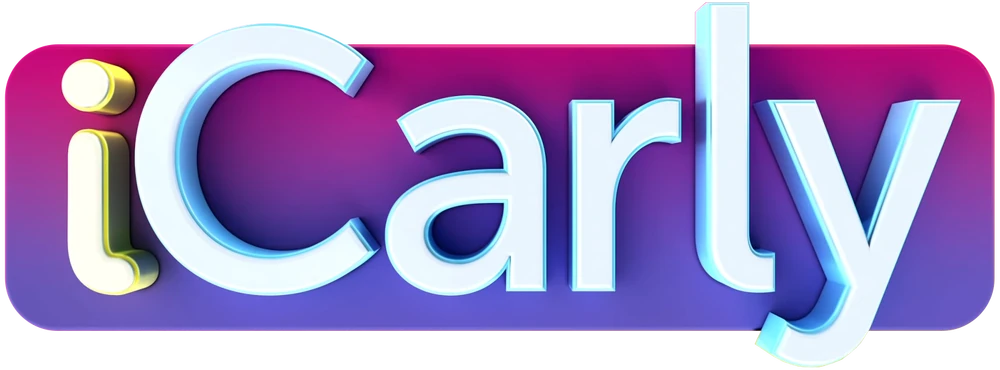
- Genre: Sitcom
- Based on: iCarly by Dan Schneider
- Developed by: Jay Kogen; Ali Schouten
- Showrunners: Jay Kogen (pilot only); Ali Schouten
- Starring: Miranda Cosgrove; Jerry Trainor; Nathan Kress; Laci Mosley; Jaidyn Triplett
- Theme music composer: Michael Corcoran
- Opening theme: "Leave It All to Me", sung by Miranda Cosgrove and Drake Bell
- Composers: Gabriel Mann; Niv Toar
- Country of origin: United States
- Original language: English
- No. of seasons: 3
- No. of episodes: 33

Production
- Executive producers: Ali Schouten; Miranda Cosgrove; Phill Lewis
- Producers: Jerry Trainor; Alissa Vradenburg; Don Dunn; Max Burnett; Harry Hannigan; Nathan Kress
- Cinematography: John Simmons
- Editors: Kirsten Greene; Richard Candib; Stephen Prime
- Running time: 23–26 minutes
- Production companies: Museum Visit; Typical Bastard Productions (season 2); Nickelodeon Productions

Original release
- Network: Paramount+
- Release: June 17, 2021 – July 27, 2023

Related
- iCarly (2007–2012); Sam & Cat (2013–2014)

iCarly is an American comedy television series and a revival of the 2007–2012 Nickelodeon teen sitcom of the same title. The series stars Miranda Cosgrove, Jerry Trainor, Nathan Kress (all reprising their roles from the original series), Laci Mosley, and Jaidyn Triplett. It premiered on Paramount+ on June 17, 2021, to positive reviews. The second season premiered on April 8, 2022, while the third season premiered on June 1, 2023. In October 2023, the series was cancelled after three seasons.

== Premise ==
Eight and a half years after the finale of the original series, Carly Shay has returned to Seattle, where she shares an apartment with her roommate Harper. Carly's older brother Spencer has become a wealthy artist after accidentally creating a renowned sculpture. Following two divorces and a failed tech start-up, Freddie Benson has moved back to live with his mother, accompanied by his adopted 11-year-old stepdaughter Millicent. All main characters live in Bushwell Plaza, the same apartment building where the original show was set. When Carly decides to relaunch her iCarly webshow, she receives mainstream attention with the help of Spencer, Freddie and her new friends.

== Cast and characters ==
Theme song

=== Main ===
- Miranda Cosgrove as Carly Shay, a social media influencer and the host of a comedy web series as well as Freddie's girlfriend
- Jerry Trainor as Spencer Shay, Carly's older brother, now a wealthy artist
- Nathan Kress as Freddie Benson, Carly's neighbor and technical producer for iCarly, as well as Carly's boyfriend
- Laci Mosley as Harper Bettencourt, a barista and aspiring fashion stylist who is Carly's friend and roommate
- Jaidyn Triplett as Millicent Mitchell, Freddie's adopted stepdaughter

=== Recurring ===
- Lyric Lewis as Maeve (season 1), Harper's cousin who pretended to be kidnapped for four years and dates Spencer for some time
- Poppy Liu as Double Dutch (season 1; guest season 2), a pop singer who hires Harper to be her stylist
- Josh Plasse as Wes (season 1; guest season 2), a car mechanic and a former love interest of Carly
- Mary Scheer as Marissa Benson, Freddie's mother and Spencer's next-door neighbor. Scheer reprises her role from the original series
- Conor Husting as Beau (season 1; guest season 2), Carly's ex-boyfriend who breaks up with her at the beginning of the series
- Jeremy Rowley as Lewbert (seasons 2–3), the former doorman at Bushwell Plaza. Rowley reprises his role from the original series
- Mia Serafino as Pearl (season 2; guest season 3), an animal therapist and Freddie's ex-girlfriend
- Patty Guggenheim as Tinsley (season 3), Harper's girlfriend

=== Guest stars ===
- Josie Totah as Willow (season 1), an influencer who appears at Spencer's exhibit
- Alex Wassabi as an ASMR influencer (season 1), who appears at Spencer's exhibit
- Bailey Stender as Prunella (seasons 1–3), Nevel's wife
- Amanda Cerny as Harmony (season 1)
- Skye Townsend as Kiki (season 1), Millicent's scout leader in the Sunshine Girls
- Christine Taylor as Argenthina (season 1)
- Carmela Zumbado as Gwen (seasons 1 & 3), Millicent's mother, and Freddie's second ex-wife
- Esther Povitsky as Brooke (season 1), a friend of Carly and Harper's
- Tony Amendola as Vinny (season 2), a man who wants to murder Granddad Shay for stealing his coins
- Rachel Bloom as McKenna (season 2), a matchmaker
- Josh Peck as Paul (seasons 2–3), Carly's manager
- Kandy Muse as Cruella Intentions (season 2)
- Mo Heart as Auntie Histamine (season 2)
- Scarlet Envy as Lana Del Slay (season 2)
- Rosé as Kimmy Kimmy Moore (season 2)
- Hannah Stocking as Sunny, the leader of an underground fight club for influencers (season 2–3)
- Benjamin Norris as Troy (season 3), Carly's date

==== Returning guest stars ====
- Danielle Morrow as Nora Dershlit (season 1), an obsessive iCarly super-fan who abducted the iCarly gang multiple times.
- Reed Alexander as Nevel Papperman (seasons 1–3), a former website critic and nemesis of Carly
- Tim Russ as Ted Franklin (seasons 1–3), Carly and Freddie's former principal from Ridgeway
- Doug Brochu as Duke Lubberman (season 1), a former student wrestler from Ridgeway
- Drew Roy as Griffin (season 1), Carly's ex-boyfriend
- Ryan Ochoa as Chuck Chambers (season 2), Spencer's former child nemesis
- Ethan Munck as Guppy (season 2), Gibby's younger brother (Note: Munck is the real-life younger brother of Noah, who played Gibby)
- Greg Mullavey as Granddad Shay (season 2), Carly and Spencer's grandfather
- Christopher David as Rodney (season 3), a former classmate of Carly's
- Skyler Day as Magic Malika (season 3), a former classmate of Carly's
- James Maslow as Shane (season 3), a former crush of Carly's
- Mason Alexander Park as Toby Peterson (season 3), a former classmate of Carly's

== Episodes ==
=== Series overview ===
Season	Episodes	Originally released	
Season	Episodes	First released	Last released
1	13	June 17, 2021	August 26, 2021
2	10	April 8, 2022	June 3, 2022
3	10	June 1, 2023	July 27, 2023

=== Season 1 (2021) ===
No. overall	No. in season	Title	Directed by	Written by	Original release date	Prod. code
1	1	"iStart Over"	Phill Lewis	Ali Schouten & Jay Kogen	June 17, 2021	101
Not to be outdone after her boyfriend breaks up with her and starts a web channel with a new girlfriend, Carly decides to relaunch her old webshow. Because Sam is off traveling with a biker gang called the Obliterators, Carly becomes the sole host, receiving rave reviews and high viewership.
2	2	"iHate Carly"	Jean Sagal	Steve Armogida & Jim Armogida	June 17, 2021	102
While attempting to track down an online hater named IHateCarly57, Carly dates Justin, who claims never to have seen her webshow. She is horrified when she finds out that Justin is IHateCarly57. Meanwhile, Spencer accidentally blinds himself with pepper spray and asks Freddie to assist him in his day-to-day activities. Guest stars: Danielle Morrow as Nora Dershlit
3	3	"iFauxpologize"	Jean Sagal	Nasser Samara	June 17, 2021	103
A photo of Carly spitting out a rancid meatball goes viral, interpreted as her reaction to Spencer's art. After Carly offers her angry brother a fauxpology, feeling that she has done nothing wrong, he reworks his art exhibit to attack her. Meanwhile, Millicent blackmails Freddie after she uncovers an old social media post saying he never wanted kids.
4	4	"iGot Your Back"	Phill Lewis	Danny Fernandez	June 24, 2021	104
To encourage Carly to attend a red-carpet event without her ex-boyfriend, Harper offers her services as a stylist. The friends question how well they really know each other when they cannot agree on an outfit. Meanwhile, Spencer unknowingly sets Freddie up on a date with a sex worker (mistaking her for a gig worker), and has to pay her expensive fees when Freddie decides to keep dating her.
5	5	"iRobot Wedding"	Anthony Rich	Kate Stayman-London	July 1, 2021	105
Carly and her friends attend Nevel Papperman's robot-themed wedding. Wary of her former nemesis, Carly suspects that Nevel's fiancée Prunella is a robot built to mess with her. Meanwhile, Spencer and Harper vie to see who can hook up with the most wedding guests, while Millicent tries to protect Freddie from heartbreak. Guest stars: Reed Alexander as Nevel Papperman, Bailey Stender as Prunella
6	6	"i'M Cursed"	Anthony Rich	Clay Lapari	July 8, 2021	106
Believing that her birthday is cursed, Carly always spends the day home alone as a precaution. When Principal Franklin delivers letters that Carly and Freddie once wrote to their future selves, Carly decides to take more risks in her 27th birthday party while Freddie attempts to recapture his youth. Meanwhile, Harper is left dumbstruck when she meets her fashion idol. Guest stars: Tim Russ as Ted Franklin, Doug Brochu as Duke Lubberman
7	7	"iNeed Space"	Anthony Rich	Franchesca Ramsey	July 15, 2021	107
After Carly and Harper struggle to work in the same apartment, Spencer's new girlfriend Argenthina introduces them to her company, which provides shared workspaces for women. Suspicious of its cultish environment, Carly discovers that Argenthina is spying on her members and selling their data. Meanwhile, Millicent joins the Sunshine Girls, but turns the other kids into workers for her own money-making enterprise.
8	8	"iLove Gwen"	Morenike Joela Evans	Korama Danquah	July 22, 2021	110
Carly and Millicent mistakenly believe that Freddie and his ex-wife Gwen still have feelings for one another, and plan to get them back together during Millicent's Romeo and Juliet school play. Meanwhile, Spencer and Harper compete for a prize. Spencer makes a set out of toast, while Harper creates Shakespearean costumes for the characters.
9	9	"iMLM"	Anthony Rich	Esther Povitsky	July 29, 2021	108
Carly reunites with Griffin ("iDate a Bad Boy", "iBeat the Heat) who introduces her to a sales opportunity that turns out to be a multilevel marketing scheme. After Carly involves Freddie, he quits his job to become a full-time seller. Meanwhile, Harper struggles with her job at Skybucks and decides to quit to focus on her fashion career. Guest stars: Drew Roy as Griffin
10	10	"iTake a Girls' Trip"	Morenike Joela Evans	Sarah Jane Cunningham & Suzie V. Freeman	August 5, 2021	109
Carly plans a girls' trip with friends Harper and Brooke, but they cancel at the last minute, leaving her to take the trip with Freddie. The two end up in awkward situations in the hotel's honeymoon suite, especially after Brooke shows up and proposes a threesome. Meanwhile, Spencer falls for Harper's cousin Maeve, who was kidnapped and spent four years at sea.
11	11	"iCan Fix It Myself"	Nathan Kress	Jordan Mitchell	August 12, 2021	111
Rather than pay for expensive auto repairs, Carly tries to fix her car on her own, with disastrous results. Meanwhile, Maeve tells Spencer that she faked her own kidnapping, and the two attempt to figure out how they can break the news to Harper, while Harper becomes the personal stylist for an eccentric pop singer named Double Dutch.
12	12	"iThrow a Flawless Dinner Party"	Phill Lewis	Jacques Mouledoux	August 19, 2021	112
Freddie programs an app to help Carly cook dinner for her new boyfriend Wes and his grandmother, who dislikes Carly. Meanwhile, Harper deals with work problems with Double Dutch, and Spencer and Maeve decide to end their relationship.
13	13	"iReturn to Webicon"	Phill Lewis	Ali Schouten	August 26, 2021	113
Carly and friends head to a secluded island to celebrate Carly's lifetime achievement award at Webicon, only to discover that they have no accommodations and that the only other person there is Carly's ex-boyfriend, Beau. While on the island, Millicent and Spencer help a depressed Freddie pitch a new start-up idea to Beau, and Harper and Dutch admit their romantic feelings for each other. Wes and Beau confess their feelings to Carly, but a helicopter saves them from the island before she can decide which one she wants to be with.

=== Season 2 (2022) ===
No. overall	No. in season	Title	Directed by	Written by	Original release date	Prod. code
14	1	"iGuess Everyone Just Hates Me Now"	Phill Lewis	Ali Schouten	April 8, 2022	201
Following the events of the previous episode, Carly has dumped both Beau and Wes, who have both started a channel together. The internet begins to hate Carly as Beau and Wes call her the "Ice Queen". After an interview with them on iCarly goes awkward, Carly fakes having a relationship with Freddie, who plays along. As a result, fans follow them around, although Freddie soon falls for his animal therapist Pearl. Meanwhile, Spencer plans a launch party for Freddie's therapy dog app, and Harper tries to take care of Dutch's pet dog Kevin.
15	2	"iObject, Lewbert!"	Phill Lewis	Danny Fernandez	April 8, 2022	205
Carly, Freddie, and Spencer are summoned to court by their former doorman Lewbert Sline, for injuries he suffered on Carly's original web show. He also brings in Guppy, the younger brother of Gibby, and Spencer's archnemesis Chuck Chambers, to make Carly and Freddie look guilty. But Carly eventually discovers that he faked the court case to get back at her. Meanwhile, Millicent tries to bond with Harper. Guest stars: Ryan Ochoa as Chuck Chambers, Ethan Munck as Guppy, Jeremy Rowley as Lewbert
16	3	"i'M Wild and Crazy"	Melissa Joan Hart	Jonathan Fener	April 15, 2022	202
After a game of never have I ever, Carly fears her life is boring and sets up a night out with Harper. Meanwhile, Spencer finds Freddie an office space for his app at the old Groovy Smoothie location.
17	4	"iHire a New Assistant"	Phill Lewis	Heather Flanders	April 22, 2022	203
Carly decides to hire her grandfather as her assistant to spend time with him, only to find herself becoming his assistant. Meanwhile, Harper is terrified when she realizes she and Freddie are a perfect match because of his birth chart. Guest stars: Greg Mullavey as Granddad Shay
18	5	"iCupid"	Anthony Rich	Eliot Glazer	April 29, 2022	204
After feeling guilty about Spencer having had to put his personal life on hold to raise her, Carly hires TV matchmaker McKenna to find a perfect match for her brother. However, he ends up falling for McKenna instead, who is not convinced that Spencer is her type. Meanwhile, as Freddie's relationship with Pearl becomes more serious, he looks to put some distance between him and his mother and decides to move out.
19	6	"iBuild a Team"	Nathan Kress	Michael Hobert	May 6, 2022	206
Carly hires a director named Paul, whom she met in Italy, to help improve her channel. However, Freddie and Paul do not get along very well, which causes Carly to take them to an escape room to try and resolve their differences. Meanwhile, Spencer tries to impress a tough food critic with his new restaurant.
20	7	"iDragged Him"	Melissa Joan Hart	Kate Stayman-London	May 13, 2022	207
Carly and Spencer get the opportunity to audition for a reality adventure competition show together, but Spencer becomes too competitive and thus create tension between the siblings. Meanwhile, Harper styles a group of drag queens while Freddie helps Millicent with her Model UN tournament.
21	8	"i'M a USA Bae"	Morenike Joela Evans	Clay Lapari	May 20, 2022	208
Carly gets excited when she is picked to be designed for a popular brand of dolls. However, when the company portrays a bad image of her, she begins to question what image she should give her fans. Meanwhile, Harper becomes attracted to the owner of the doll store, and Freddie begins to think that he and Pearl are having trouble with their relationship.
22	9	"iHit Something"	Nathan Kress	Korama Danquah	May 27, 2022	209
Feeling humiliated after falling for a prank, Carly contacts an influencer named Sunny who can help her to manage her anger, but is introduced to an underground fight club for influencers. Meanwhile, Freddie and Spencer help Millicent after she is paired with her crush Derek for a school project.
23	10	"iThrow a Flawless Murder Mystery Party"	Morenike Joela Evans	Jacques Mouledoux	June 3, 2022	210
Freddie's birthday is coming up, and Carly ends up preparing most of the party after Pearl reveals that she does not know much about his interests. During the party, however, hints that Carly and Freddie may like each other begin to emerge, making Pearl uncomfortable and ultimately causing her to run out of the room. Meanwhile, Spencer and Harper try to leave the party early to reach their dates, and Marissa tries to bond with Millicent, who is distracted by her new relationship with Derek.

=== Season 3 (2023) ===
No. overall	No. in season	Title	Directed by	Written by	Original release date	Prod. code
24	1	"iBuckled"	Phill Lewis	Ali Schouten-Seeks	June 1, 2023	301
Carly begins to question her feelings for Freddie, and hires Paul to help her create a reality TV show to keep her distracted from her feelings. However, Paul keeps giving subtle hints that she has feelings for Freddie. Meanwhile, Marissa and Lewbert become engaged, and Millicent tries to get Marissa to make her the maid of honor. Guest stars: Jeremy Rowley as Lewbert
25	2	"iLove Your Shoes"	Phill Lewis	Erica Montolfo-Bura	June 1, 2023	302
Carly meets Troy, a furniture worker, through a dating app and starts dating him, while continuing to battle with her feelings for Freddie. Freddie, meanwhile, tries to stay committed to Pearl, but eventually Pearl snaps and declares that Freddie and Carly really do have feelings for each other, and dumps Freddie to be with Troy. Meanwhile, Spencer, after receiving a negative review of his artwork, tries to lose his wealth and become an average person, while Harper deals with her old high school bully, Tinsley.
26	3	"iMake New Memories"	Anthony Rich	Kate Stayman-London	June 8, 2023	303
When Spencer destroys Carly's hard drive with all her pictures in it, she and Freddie team up to recreate those memories. In the process, they have an argument about when he visited her in Italy the month after she moved there and asked her to be his girlfriend, only for her to laugh at him. Later Carly tells Freddie that she likes him. Freddie also confesses his feelings and they kiss, starting a new relationship. Meanwhile, Harper tries to help Marissa design a wedding gown.
27	4	"iGo Public"	Morenike Joela Evans	Dave Malkoff	June 15, 2023	304
Freddie wants to announce to the public that he and Carly are a couple, but Carly plans a picnic on the roof to prevent that, as she is not ready. She changes her mind when they get stuck on the roof. Carly and Freddie reassure each other about their relationship and announce it to the world. Meanwhile, Harper and Millicent become obsessed with a new arcade game.
28	5	"iFaked It"	Nathan Kress	Julia Ahumada Grob	June 22, 2023	305
Nevel Papperman and his wife Prunella start launching deepfakes of Carly on the internet endorsing a new rancid pasta dish, which Spencer is tricked into selling at Shay What?!. Carly, Spencer and Freddie confront them at an abandoned warehouse, and ultimately exact revenge by launching a deepfake of Nevel and Prunella, which initially causes Prunella to dump Nevel, but after they receive a cardboard cutout of Carly as a wedding present, all is forgiven and they have sex. Meanwhile, Harper butts heads with Dimitri, a friend of her girlfriend Tinsley. Guest stars: Reed Alexander as Nevel Papperman, Bailey Stender as Prunella
29	6	"iReunited and It Felt Okay"	Phill Lewis	Eliot Glazer	June 29, 2023	306
Carly and Freddie attend their 10-year, high school reunion, where Carly is set on having her photo taken with the class since she was in Italy for most of senior year. However, she learns she did not actually graduate because she is short of a P.E. credit, and has to convince the current P.E. teacher, Shane ("iSaw Him First"), to accredit her. Meanwhile, Spencer is revealed to have eleven biological children from sperm donation. Guest stars: Christopher David as Rodney, Skyler Day as Magic Malika, James Maslow as Shane, Mason Alexander Park as Toby Peterson, Tim Russ as Ted Franklin
30	7	"iGo to Toledo"	Nathan Kress	Nasser Samara	July 6, 2023	307
Carly, Millicent, Harper and Marissa's friend Danica go to Toledo, Ohio for Marissa's bachelorette party. While there, Carly tries to impress Marissa to show she is a good girlfriend for Freddie and get her approval. However, Marissa keeps disproving of Carly and decides to trap herself in the wall of the house they are renovating. Meanwhile, Freddie and Spencer throw Lewbert a bachelor party with Paul, Carly's manager. Guest stars: Jeremy Rowley as Lewbert
31	8	"iCause a Cat-astrophe"	Jerry Trainor	Harry Hannigan	July 13, 2023	308
Wanting to befriend Harper's girlfriend, Carly accepts a pair of earrings from Tinsley. After discovering the jewelry's true worth, Carly decides to donate the earrings to a charity auction in support of cats. However, when Harper learns about the donation and the fact that Tinsley will be attending the event, she encourages Carly to steal the earrings back. Meanwhile, Spencer creates a cat castle for the event and tries to help Freddie conquer his fear of all things feline, and Millicent becomes enamored with a famous cat at the event.
32	9	"iCreate a New Ecosystem"	Phill Lewis	Aydrea Walden	July 20, 2023	309
Gwen comes to visit, and Carly and Freddie want to prove to her they can be good parents for Millicent. Worried about how Gwen is going to react to them dating, Carly and Freddie try to come up with a way to tell her, which leads Spencer to believe Carly is pregnant.
33	10	"iHave a Proposal"	Phill Lewis	Melanie Kirschbaum & Alexandra Decas	July 27, 2023	310
Closing in on the day of Marissa and Lewbert's wedding, Carly begins alluding to Freddie that she wants him to propose. Spencer tries to talk to Carly about this, only to mangle his words, causing Carly to panic at the thought of Freddie proposing, and Freddie to fear she may never want to marry him. After Spencer clears up the misunderstanding, Carly admits she is afraid of becoming committed in marriage because their mother abandoned them as young children. She also confides in Freddie about this, though says that dating him has made her reconsider her views on marriage. On the day of the wedding, Marissa and Lewbert decide at the last minute to go to Las Vegas and elope like they had originally planned. Carly and Freddie consider getting married in their place, but before anything can be discussed, Spencer and Carly are shocked to see their mother arrive at the venue, ending the episode and the series on a cliffhanger. Guest stars: Jeremy Rowley as Lewbert

== Production ==
=== Development ===
Then-Nickelodeon executive Paula Kaplan contacted Cosgrove with a pitch for a new iCarly series, revolving around Carly and Spencer running a Hype House-like content house with a new generation of influencers taking influence from the iCarly web show. The demographic for the show was planned to be aimed towards kids, following in the same footsteps as other revivals and spin-offs like Disney Channel's Raven's Home and Girl Meets World. "I don't think that any of us would have been up for that [idea]," she says. "What excited me about doing iCarly again was getting to put the characters in situations that we couldn't show before." Cosgrove contacted Jerry Trainor, Nathan Kress and Jennette McCurdy about the project. Kress and Trainor were on board with the project, however McCurdy declined. After multiple conversations with the returning cast, Cosgrove requested that the revival series be aimed towards the adults who grew up with it, which ViacomCBS and AwesomenessTV immediately agreed to, unlike the shelved Lizzie McGuire series being developed at Disney+. As the executive producer of the series, Cosgrove wanted to incorporate more mature topics and diversity into the series, as well as nostalgia.

The series was announced in December 2020, with Jay Kogen and Ali Schouten serving as co-showrunners and executive producers. Cosgrove, Kress, and Trainor would reprise their roles from the original series. In February 2021, it was reported that Kogen left the project due to "creative differences" with Cosgrove, though he still retained a writing credit alongside Ali Schouten for the first episode, "iStart Over." Later that month, McCurdy confirmed that she would not reprise her role of Sam Puckett for the revival, as a result of quitting acting and feeling embarrassed by her past career. It was also revealed that the revival had been picked up for 13 episodes, with the pilot being directed by Phill Lewis, and written by Kogen and Schouten. In May, the premiere date was revealed to be June 17, 2021, with a teaser image also being revealed. On June 1, the first official trailer of the revival was released. On July 15, the series was renewed for a second season.

On July 27, 2022, the series was renewed for a third season, which premiered on June 1, 2023.

On October 4, 2023, the series was canceled after three seasons.

=== Casting ===
In March 2021, it was reported that Laci Mosley had been cast as Harper, Carly's new roommate and best friend, and that Jaidyn Triplett had been cast as Millicent, Freddie's snarky and social media-obsessed step-daughter. Since the announcement of her casting, Mosley has been the target of attacks from fans who saw her as a replacement for McCurdy's character from the original. In response, Franchesca Ramsey, one of the writers of the show, tweeted "Laci's character Harper isn't replacing Sam. No one could replace Jennette McCurdy or her incredible talent! But it's both racist as hell & completely unfair to decide that Laci hasn't earned her role especially since the show isn't even out yet!!"

=== Filming ===
In March 2021, filming for the revival had officially begun. Production on the first season ended on June 25, 2021. Production on the second season began in October 2021 and ended on February 2, 2022.

=== Series finale film ===
In May 2024, Cosgrove has stated that she wants to wrap up the entire series with a finale film, confirming it would be likely, saying, "I'm pretty sure it's gonna happen, so I'm excited, and I'd love to get to wrap up the story". A few months later, in November, Cosgrove vaguely revealed that the project was in development.

In August 2025, Cosgrove confirmed the film was being written and that Carly and Spencer's mother will play a major role in it, but the character casting has yet to be confirmed. Later in September, Cosgrove appeared on The Drew Barrymore Show and again confirmed that filming will begin in early 2026. It was later reported by Drew Barrymore that the film would be released by Netflix, after speaking with Cosgrove. Shortly after these announcements, Kress and Trainor clarified that, despite Cosgrove's comments, the film was still in early development and had not been officially greenlit.

In December, Kress stated that the film was still not greenlit but believed it would be in early 2026, with hopes of beginning filming sometime in the first quarter of the year. In June 2026, it was reported that the script was being rewritten and that, if everything went well, the film could be approved to enter production soon. The following month, Kress stated that the film was in active development and that he had read an outline. He added that "everybody’s going to be pretty happy with the way that everything gets wrapped up."

== Release ==
The first three episodes were released on June 17, 2021, with subsequent episodes released weekly until August 26, 2021. The first episode, albeit slightly shortened, aired on Nick at Nite on July 17, 2021. The second season premiered on April 8, 2022. "iObject, Lewbert!" became the second episode overall to receive a linear airing, leading out of the 2022 Kids' Choice Awards on April 9 on Nickelodeon, as well as an airing on MTV on April 19, 2022.

== Reception ==
=== Critical response ===
Critics gave the first season positive reviews. On the review aggregator Rotten Tomatoes, the first season holds a 100% approval rating with an average rating of 6.7/10, based on eight reviews.

=== Awards and nominations ===
Year	Award	Category	Result	Ref.
2022	Kids' Choice Awards	Favorite Family TV Show	Won	
2023	Kids' Choice Awards	Favorite Family TV Show	Nominated	
2024	Kids' Choice Awards	Favorite Family TV Show	Nominated	
