= Don't Tell Larry =

2023 American dark comedy film

- Theatrical release poster
- Directed by: Greg Porper; John Schimke
- Written by: Greg Porper; John Schimke
- Produced by: Greg Porper
- Starring: Patty Guggenheim; Kiel Kennedy; Kenneth Mosley; Dot-Marie Jones; Ed Begley Jr.
- Production company: Pro Key Entertainment
- Distributed by: Level 33 Entertainment
- Release dates: October 27, 2023 (Austin Film Festival); June 20, 2025 (US)
- Running time: 95 minutes
- Country: United States
- Language: English

Don't Tell Larry is a 2023 American dark comedy film written and directed by Greg Porper and John Schimke. The film stars Patty Guggenheim, Kiel Kennedy, Kenneth Mosley, Dot-Marie Jones, and Ed Begley Jr.

== Plot ==
After lying to her new eccentric coworker Larry about a company party, an ambitious promotion-seeking office worker must deal with the wildly unexpected consequences. As her white lie spirals out of control, suspicions of a mysterious workplace death surface, and Susan finds herself entangled in a chaotic cover-up that pushes her ambition and morality to the edge.

== Cast ==
- Patty Guggenheim as Susan
- Kiel Kennedy as Larry
- Kenneth Mosley as Patrick
- Dot-Marie Jones as Detective Kim Hammer
- Ed Begley Jr. as Bruce Waters

== Production ==
The film was shot in and around the Dallas/Fort Worth metro area, with scenes set in the Upper Midwest. Porper and Schimke scouted dozens of office buildings before selecting a vacant mid-rise in Hurst, Texas, formerly occupied by an architecture firm. The space had “disassembled cubicles, broken furniture, and a floor lined with decades-old binders and dot-matrix printers.” The filmmakers rented it for two months, spending nearly four weeks cleaning it out and converting it into a functioning film set.

The film began as a web series and was developed into a feature during the COVID-19 pandemic, partially funded by the filmmakers selling off personal assets.

== Release ==
Don't Tell Larry had its world premiere at the 2023 Austin Film Festival, where its script had previously advanced to the Second Round in the 2020 competition. It was released in select theaters as part of a day/date release in the United States on June 20, 2025, by Level 33 Entertainment.

== Reception ==
Writing for Film Threat, Sabina Dana Plasse called the film “a blast of fresh-air comedy” and described it as “loaded with laughs, gasps, and cringes.”

John Edward Betancourt of Nerds That Geek described the film as “a delightfully demented black comedy” and “a perfect comedy when all is said and done.”

Mike Patrick of Movie Jawn wrote that the film “brings a fresh perspective to the office comedy genre,” and includes “genuinely gripping moments.”

Luna Guthrie of Collider described it as “a workplace comedy that’s as bizarre as it is unpredictable,” while noting that “some pacing issues hold it back from hitting every mark.”
