= Mean, Green, and Straight Poured into These Jeans =

- She-Hulk: Attorney at Law episode
- Promotional poster
- Episode no.: Episode 5
- Directed by: Anu Valia
- Written by: Dana Schwartz
- Cinematography by: Doug Chamberlain
- Editing by: Stacey Schroeder
- Original release date: September 15, 2022
- Running time: 31 minutes

Cast
- Steve Coulter as Holden Holliway; Nicholas Cirillo as Cousin Ched; Brandon Stanley as Eugene Patilio; David Otunga as Derek; Eddy Rioseco as Noah; Michel Curiel as Arthur; Darin Toonder as Robert Wallis

Episode chronology
← Previous "Is This Not Real Magic?"	Next → "Just Jen"

"Mean, Green, and Straight Poured into These Jeans" is the fifth episode of the American television series She-Hulk: Attorney at Law, based on Marvel Comics featuring the character She-Hulk. It follows lawyer Jennifer Walters / She-Hulk as she faces a lawsuit by Titania for the "She-Hulk" name. The episode is set in the Marvel Cinematic Universe (MCU), sharing continuity with the films of the franchise. It was written by Dana Schwartz and directed by Anu Valia.

Tatiana Maslany stars as Walters, alongside Josh Segarra, Jameela Jamil, Ginger Gonzaga, Jon Bass, Griffin Matthews, and Renée Elise Goldsberry. Valia joined the series by December 2020 to direct multiple episodes.

"Mean, Green, and Straight Poured into These Jeans" was released on Disney+ on September 15, 2022.

== Plot ==
Jennifer Walters discovers that Titania is suing her for the rights to her own name, having trademarked "She-Hulk" for a new line of beauty products. Holliway warns Walters that she needs to deal with the situation quickly, and assigns Mallory Book as her attorney for the case. Nikki and Pug come up with a plan to acquire a superhero outfit for Walters from Luke Jacobson, a highly exclusive tailor who does work on the side making commissioned special made super-suits for a number of underground vigilantes, while Book and Walters decide to countersue Titania in the hopes of regaining the She-Hulk trademark.

Walters is annoyed to discover that Todd, one of her unsuccessful dates, is also a client at GLK&H, but this helps her to realize that she can use her dating-app history to establish a past record of her identifying as She-Hulk before Titania ever tried to gain the trademark. Thanks to her past dates' all being subpoenaed and testifying on her behalf, Walters wins the case, and a humiliated Titania is ordered to discontinue sales of every one of her products bearing the name "She-Hulk". Walters establishes a tentative friendship with Book, who had previously been hostile to her for getting to head up the superhuman law division over her. Jacobson agrees to design a new business outfit for Walters that she can wear as both herself and She-Hulk as well as another suit hidden from view.

== Production ==
=== Development ===
In August 2019, Marvel Studios announced that She-Hulk: Attorney at Law was being developed for the streaming service Disney+. By December 2020, Anu Valia was hired to direct three episodes, including the fifth. Executive producers include Marvel Studios' Kevin Feige, Louis D'Esposito, Victoria Alonso, and Brad Winderbaum, in addition to lead director Kat Coiro, and head writer Jessica Gao. The fifth episode, titled "Mean, Green, and Straight Poured into These Jeans", was written by Dana Schwartz, and was released on Disney+ on September 15, 2022. The title of the episode is a reference to what Jennifer Walters put as her "about section" of She-Hulk's dating profile, while the episode's title card is altered to say She-Hulk by Titania.

=== Writing ===
Exploring Walters navigating her dating life was "so beautiful" to Valia, because they were able to show with one of her dates, Arthur, the hurt she feels that he only was interested in She-Hulk and not Walters. Valia said, "the essence of what's being explored is like, 'You like this other side of me, but not both sides? That's also me.'" and conceded it was hard to understand given she believed Walters was equally as attractive as She-Hulk. Mallory Book becomes better friends with Walters by the end of the episode, faster than the two characters did in the comics. Actress Renée Elise Goldsberry felt the change in medium warranted a faster bonding between the two, since she starts out by not respecting She-Hulk, but feels Walters earns Book's respect by the end of the episode, though still not necessarily making them friends. Goldsberry believed Book had to give Walters her respect in order to "commiserate a little bit about what they have in common in the world they live in".

The end of the episode shows Luke Jacobson has been creating a new suit for Matt Murdock / Daredevil, who appears later in the series. Valia was surprised to see this included in the script, and called it "a lot of responsibility" but "very fun". "Mean, Green, and Straight Poured into These Jeans" is the first of the series to not feature a mid-credits scene. Valia, Gao, and Marvel "played around with different versions" of the episode to see if a credits scene would work, ultimately believing the tease of both She-Hulk and Daredevil's costumes before the credits was the strongest.

=== Design ===
Titania's wardrobe and makeup were changed to a green color palette for the episode as a way to highlight the character trying to get in Walters' head and annoy her. Actress Jameela Jamil said it was "incredibly enjoyable that she would think wearing green would make her more likely to win the case". The "Avongers" and "Avingers" merchandise was designed by 100 Soft, who also creates various Marvel Cinematic Universe (MCU) character Twitter emojis.

=== Casting ===
The episode stars Tatiana Maslany as Jennifer Walters / She-Hulk, Josh Segarra as Augustus "Pug" Pugliese, Jameela Jamil as Titania, Ginger Gonzaga as Nikki Ramos, Jon Bass as Todd, Griffin Matthews as Luke Jacobson, and Renée Elise Goldsberry as Mallory Book. Also appearing are Steve Coulter as Holden Holliway, Nicholas Cirillo as Cousin Ched, Brandon Stanley as Eugene Patilio, David Otunga as Derek, Eddy Rioseco as Noah, Michel Curiel as Arthur, and Darin Toonder as Robert Wallis. News anchor Bob DeCastro appears as himself.

=== Filming and visual effects ===
Filming occurred at Trilith Studios in Atlanta, Georgia, with Valia directing the episode, and Doug Chamberlain serving as cinematographer. More material of the Ramos and Pug subplot was filmed with Gonzaga and Segarra that did not make it into the episode. Valia praised the duo's chemistry for this part of the episode.

Visual effects for the series were created by Digital Domain, Wētā FX, Wylie Co., Cantina Creative, FuseFX, SDFX Studios, Capital T, Keep Me Posted, WeFX, Soho VFX, and Lightstage.

=== Music ===
The following songs are featured in the episode: "Go Higher" by Prop Pilot, "Fire at Night" by Yianni Anastos-Prastacos, Alex Strahle, and Miles Eberhardt, "Shine" by Tiffany Pierce and Lestley Renaldo Pierce Jr., "Golden" by King Hawkins, and "Say My Name" by Tove Styrke.

== Marketing ==
A QR code was included in the episode that allowed viewers to access a free digital copy of She-Hulk (2004) #10. After the episode's release, Marvel announced merchandise inspired by the episode as part of its weekly "Marvel Must Haves" promotion for each episode of the series, including She-Hulk pins, a Titania Funko Pop, and apparel for both characters. Additionally, the Avengers' Twitter account updated its display name, bio, and icon to "Avongers" after its use in the episode. As well, Titania's Twitter account released the commercial for her line of She-Hulk beauty products and a message from Titania appeared on the series' hotline number noting she held the She-Hulk trademark and thus the hotline number, replacing its previous message.

== Reception ==
=== Viewership ===
According to market research company Parrot Analytics, which looks at consumer engagement in consumer research, streaming, downloads, and on social media, She-Hulk: Attorney at Law maintained its position in the breakout shows ranking for the week ending September 16, 2022, which are defined as the most in-demand series that have premiered in the past 100 days, with 33.2 times the average series demand, despite a 6% decline from the previous week. Nielsen Media Research, which records streaming viewership on U.S. television screens, reported that it was the tenth-most watched original series across streaming services for the week of September 12–18, 2022, with 403 million minutes watched, a 20.1% decrease from the previous week. Whip Media, which tracks viewership data for the more than 21 million worldwide users of its TV Time app, calculated that She-Hulk: Attorney at Law was the second most-streamed original series in the U.S. for the week ending September 18, 2022.

=== Critical response ===
The review aggregator website Rotten Tomatoes reports a 72% approval rating with an average rating of 6.60/10, based on 18 reviews. The site's critical consensus reads, "Jennifer Walters finds herself in the hot seat in an installment that could have used more heat, although She-Hulk's side characters get to shine and there's a devilish hint of better things to come."

Reviewing the episode for Den of Geek, Lacy Baugher enjoyed the episode, giving the episode 4 stars out of 5, saying the series "finally seems fully confident in what kind of show it wants to be" since it was the "most cohesive installment yet, one that actually uses its broader plot to say something significant about Jen Walters' journey as a superhero". Additionally, the lack of cameo appearances in the episode helped She-Hulk present "a clear and purposeful identity of its own" and allowed the ensemble cast to shine, particularly Goldsberry, Gonzaga, and Matthews. Baugher liked the shift in story towards identity and self-acceptance, and was hopeful the series was building towards Walters embracing the She-Hulk identity, and that the two "are simply two halves of the same whole". Giving the episode an "A–", Arezou Amin of Collider also felt that the lack of cameo appearances allowed the cast to "shine wholly on their own, and [helped further] She-Hulk's procedural style". Amin pointed out Gonzaga, who she called "a delightful comedic presence on the show", since she was able to help ground the series, and was glad Goldsberry began to have a more prominent role after her brief appearance in the third episode.

Alex Stedman at IGN gave the episode a 7 out of 10, saying it had some "nice character development" for Walters and her feelings about She-Hulk, despite the series' format "beginning to feel a bit familiar". She added that Titania's beauty ads were "painfully realistic" and praised Jamil's performance of the character, while also enjoying the side storyline involving Ramos and Pug. The A.V. Club's Mary Kate Carr felt the episode suffered from not having any cameo appearances and that it lost its "momentum" from the previous episodes, believing it started "very slow". Like her colleague noted in their review of the previous episode, Carr felt Ramos still lacked any meaningful character development "beyond supporting Jen personally and professionally", but did enjoy Ramos and Pug talking to Jacobson in their "Avongers" merchandise, calling it one of the episode's highlights. She gave "Mean, Green, and Straight Poured into These Jeans" a "B–".
