= Jaidyn Triplett =

American actress (born 2010)

- Born: November 24, 2010 (age 15); Ohio, U.S.
- Occupations: Actress; singer
- Years active: 2014–present

Jaidyn Triplett (born November 24, 2010) is an American actress and singer. She has acted on the series The Affair and iCarly and in the films All About the Money and The Beach Trip.

== Filmography ==
=== Film ===
| Year | Title | Role | Notes |
|---|---|---|---|
| 2014 | A Kid from Southside | Daughter | Short |
| 2015 | Vacation | Daughter | Short |
| 2015 | Sound and Color | Young girl | |
| 2016 | All About the Money | Reggie | |
| 2016 | Not a Love Story | Sassy Classmate | Short |
| 2016 | Major Deal | Kennedy | |
| 2017 | F***, Marry, Kill | Little girl | Short; voice |
| 2017 | The Beach Trip | | |
| 2018 | A Stone Cold Christmas | Tina Miller | |
| 2019 | Bre's Company | Carter | Short |
| 2019 | Love or Laughs | Breast Feeding Baby | |
| 2024 | Hauntology | Venus Price | |

=== Television ===
| Year | Title | Role | Notes |
|---|---|---|---|
| 2014 | How to Be a Grown Up | Daughter | 1 episode |
| 2017 | Unarmed | Lexi Harris | TV Short |
| 2017 | Army of None | Brooke Lynn Payne | TV Mini Series |
| 2018 | Rhino | Nalah | TV Movie |
| 2018 | Black-ish | Young Zoey | 1 episode |
| 2019 | Last Life | Daughter | 1 episode |
| 2019 | Family Reunion | Lily | 1 episode |
| 2019 | These Streets Don't Love You Like I Do! | Alexa Diaz | 1 episode |
| 2019 | The Affair | Thea | 3 episodes |
| 2019 | See | Sheena | 1 episode |
| 2020 | Station 19 | Eight Year Old Victoria | 1 episode |
| 2021 | 5150 | Raven | TV Short |
| 2021–2023 | iCarly | Millicent Mitchell | 33 episodes |
| 2022 | The Villains of Valley View | Scarlett | 1 episode |
| 2023 | Secrets of Sulphur Springs | Ruby | 4 episodes |

== Discography ==
=== Studio albums ===
| Title | Album details |
|---|---|
| Young Girl with a Big Dream | Released: August 1, 2024; Label: Independent; Formats: Digital download |

=== Extended plays ===
| Title | Album details |
|---|---|
| Bopstar | Released: November 17, 2023; Label: Independent; Formats: Digital download |

=== Singles ===
- Bopstar (2023)
- Tornado (2023)
- Enough (2023)
- Gone with the wind (2023)
