= Melanie Field =

American actress and singer

- Born: February 18, 1988 (age 38); Philadelphia, Pennsylvania, U.S.
- Education: New York University (BM); Yale University (MFA)
- Occupations: Actress; Singer
- Years active: 2017–present
- Spouse: Zachary Likins (m. 2022)

Melanie Field (born February 18, 1988) is an American actress and singer, known for her roles as Heather Chandler on the reboot series of Heathers, Kaitlin on Florida Girls, Sunrise on You, and Jo Deluca on the Amazon series A League of Their Own.

== Career ==
Melanie Field graduated with a Master's Degree from Yale School of Drama in 2016. She gained recognition for being cast as Heather Chandler in the television adaptation of Heathers, a role originated by the late Kim Walker. The series was met with controversy and was cancelled after a single, hastily aired season.

In 2019, Field had a recurring role in the Netflix series You as Sunrise, a stay at home mommy-blogger. That same year she starred in Florida Girls as Kaitlin, the leader of a quartet of girls looking to make something of themselves. Her character is described as a "badass". She was later cast as Bitsy Sussman in The Angel of Darkness, the sequel series of The Alienist.

In 2020, Field was cast in Amazon's comedy pilot A League of Their Own as Jo Deluca.

== Personal life ==
Field married Zachary Likins on May 14, 2022.

In 2022, Field revealed that she is queer in an article for autostraddle.com.

== Filmography ==
Year	Title	Role	Notes
2017	The Tap	Sandy	TV Pilot
2018	Code Black	Kathy	Episode: "Only Human"
2018	Heathers	Heather Chandler	Main cast
2019	Shrill	Vic	2 episodes
2019	Henry Danger	Hot Dog Lady	Episode: "Henry Danger: The Musical"
2019	Florida Girls	Kaitlin	Main cast
2019	You	Sunrise Darshan Cummings	Recurring (Season 2)
2020	The Alienist: Angel of Darkness	Bitsy Sussman	Main cast
2022	A League of Their Own	Jo Deluca	Main cast
2023	Killing It	Shayla	Recurring (Season 2)
2024	American Horror Stories	Megan	Episode: "The Thing Under the Bed"
2026	Home Delivery	Ellye Ferguson	
