= Florida Girls =

American sitcom

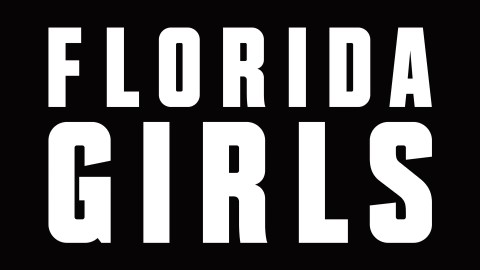
- Created by: Laura Chinn
- Starring: Laura Chinn; Patty Guggenheim; Laci Mosley; Melanie Field
- Country of origin: United States
- Original language: English
- No. of seasons: 1
- No. of episodes: 10

Production
- Executive producers: Laura Chinn; Jared Miller; Tony Hernandez; Lilly Burns; Oly Obst; Josh Lieberman
- Camera setup: Single
- Running time: 22 minutes
- Production companies: Jax Media; Chinncorporated; 3 Arts Entertainment; Lionsgate Television

Original release
- Network: Pop
- Release: July 10 – August 7, 2019

Florida Girls is an American sitcom created by and starring Laura Chinn. It follows four women who live in a trailer park, played by Chinn, Melanie Field, Patty Guggenheim, and Laci Mosley. The series premiered on Pop on July 10, 2019. On October 3, 2019, the series was renewed for a second season, but on March 3, 2020, Pop cancelled the show along with several other originals.

== Synopsis ==
Florida Girls follows a group of four women, who live in a trailer park in Florida. When one of their friends receives her GED and moves out of state, Shelby becomes unsatisfied with the status quo, and aspires to do the same with her friends.

== Cast ==
- Laura Chinn as Shelby
- Melanie Field as Kaitlin
- Patty Guggenheim as Erica
- Laci Mosley as Jayla
- Patrick Roper as Ken
- William Tokarsky as Chuck
- Kym Whitley as Shelby's Mom
- Constance Schulman as Deborah
- Chris Williams as Harold
- Scott MacArthur as Devo
- Courtney Pauroso as Crystal Meth
- Ben Bladon as Wattie

== Episodes ==
No.	Title	Directed by	Written by	Original release date	US viewers (millions)
1	"Pilot"	Kat Coiro	Laura Chinn	July 10, 2019	0.079
2	"Dirty Ass River"	Kat Coiro	Jared Miller	July 10, 2019	0.071
3	"Sunday Chunky Sunday"	Matt Sohn	Laura Chinn	July 17, 2019	0.046
4	"Are We on a Church Trip?!"	Kat Coiro	Laura Chinn	July 17, 2019	0.045
5	"What's Your Favorite Boat?"	Matt Sohn	Laura Chinn	July 24, 2019	0.064
6	"Stop Pretending to Read"	Matt Sohn	Marquita J. Robinson	July 24, 2019	0.052
7	"We're Doing a Drive-By, Y'All!"	Rachael Holder	Jared Miller	July 31, 2019	0.092
8	"Welfare Queen"	Matt Sohn	Harper Dill	July 31, 2019	0.088
9	"Island Party: Part One"	Matt Sohn	Jared Miller	August 7, 2019	0.083
10	"Island Party: Part Two"	Matt Sohn	Laura Chinn	August 7, 2019	0.071

== Reception ==
=== Critical response ===
On review aggregator Rotten Tomatoes, the series holds an approval rating of 85% based on 13 reviews." On Metacritic, it has a weighted average score of 69 out of 100, based on 6 critics, indicating "generally favorable reviews".

Time wrote "Florida Girls may well turn out to be the most enjoyable new show of the summer." The New York Times described the show as "more endearing than challenging, more amiable than thought-provoking, clever enough to engage but not necessarily funny enough to enchant."
