= After the End (film) =

2021 film directed by Ron Hanks

- Directed by: Ron Hanks
- Written by: Joshua Scher
- Starring: Justin Hall; Alex Frnka
- Release date: 2017
- Running time: 82 minutes
- Country: United States
- Language: English

After The End is a 2017 post-apocalyptic coming of age story written by Joshua Scher and directed by Ron Hanks in his feature debut. Originally titled I’m Ok, the film was released in 2021 as After The End. The movie stars Justin Hall as a 17-year-old doomsday prepper navigating the challenges of adolescence and the emotional toll of isolation.

== Plot ==
In the aftermath of a devastating viral pandemic that has wiped out much of the population, 17-year-old Addison (Justin Hall) roams the rural Oklahoma countryside, searching for supplies and survivors. Trained by his survivalist uncle, Izzy, Addison is methodical and resourceful, maintaining a well-stocked storm cellar as his base camp. Despite his preparation for every conceivable disaster, he struggles with the crushing loneliness of isolation, finding solace only in music and videos of his late mother. Determined to find his uncle, Addison sets out on his bicycle to reach a neighboring city.

Along the way, Addison encounters Ava (Alex Frnka), a pregnant teenager navigating her own perilous journey. Initially distrustful of one another, the two gradually form an uneasy alliance. As their bond grows, the barren, lifeless world around them seems to transform—vivid landscapes emerge as a reflection of the hope and connection they bring to each other.

Their fragile peace is shattered by the arrival of three armed men, led by the ruthless and manipulative Fish. The men are relentless in their pursuit of Ava, intent on claiming her for their twisted vision of survival. As Fish sows seeds of mistrust between Addison and Ava, the pair must navigate both external threats and their own fears about survival and humanity.

What follows is a confrontation where Addison and Ava must confront the depths of their resilience and the true cost of survival. In a barren world, their choices will determine not only their fate but the possibility of a future worth fighting for.

== Cast ==
- Alex Frnka as Ava
- Justin Hall as Addison
- Kevin E. West as Fish
- Billy Chase Goforth as Esau
- Warren McCullough as Zeke
- Dot-Marie Jones as Mom
- Missy Speer Gipson as Bridget
