= After the End (album) =

Studio album by Merchandise
- Released: August 25, 2014
- Label: 4AD
- Producers: Carson Cox; Merchandise

Professional ratings
Aggregate scores
Source	Rating
AnyDecentMusic?	6.8/10
Metacritic	74/100
Review scores
Source	Rating
AllMusic	4/5 stars
Creative Loafing Tampa	3.5/5 stars
The Guardian	4/5 stars
Mojo	4/5 stars
NME	4.5/5 stars
The Observer	2/5 stars
Pitchfork	7/10
Q	3/5 stars
Rolling Stone	3/5 stars
Spectrum Culture	1.25/5

After the End is a studio album by Tampa, Florida group Merchandise, released on the 4AD label in 2014. It was the band's first album on a major record label, and marked the beginning of, in the group's words, "a new band with basically the same name."

== Year-end lists ==
Publication	Rank
Consequence of Sound	50
Crack Magazine	88
The Guardian	22
NME	7
Stereogum	10
Uncut	32

== Track listing ==
No.	Title	Length
1.	"Corridor"	2:46
2.	"Enemy"	2:49
3.	"True Monument"	4:59
4.	"Green Lady"	4:28
5.	"Life Outside the Mirror"	4:55
6.	"Telephone"	4:05
7.	"Little Killer"	3:05
8.	"Looking Glass Waltz"	4:01
9.	"After the End"	6:55
10.	"Exile and Ego"	4:34

== Charts ==
Chart (2014)	Peak position
US Heatseekers Albums (Billboard)	7
