= Just Jen =

- She-Hulk: Attorney at Law episode
- Title card for the episode
- Episode no.: Episode 6
- Directed by: Anu Valia
- Written by: Kara Brown
- Cinematography by: Doug Chamberlain
- Editing by: Jamie Gross
- Original release date: September 22, 2022
- Running time: 31 minutes

Cast
- Nicholas Cirillo as Cousin Ched; Trevor Slater as Josh Miller; David Pasquesi as Craig Hollis / Mr. Immortal; McKenzie Kurtz as Heather

Episode chronology
← Previous "Mean, Green, and Straight Poured into These Jeans"	Next → "The Retreat"

"Just Jen" is the sixth episode of the American television series She-Hulk: Attorney at Law, based on Marvel Comics featuring the character She-Hulk. It follows Jennifer Walters as she attends her friend's wedding, in hopes of being appreciated for her accomplishments as Walters beyond those of She-Hulk's. The episode is set in the Marvel Cinematic Universe (MCU), sharing continuity with the films of the franchise. It was written by Kara Brown and directed by Anu Valia.

Tatiana Maslany stars as Walters, alongside Jameela Jamil, Ginger Gonzaga, Patti Harrison, and Renée Elise Goldsberry. Valia joined the series by December 2020 to direct multiple episodes.

"Just Jen" was released on Disney+ on September 22, 2022.

== Plot ==
Jennifer Walters is invited as a bridesmaid to her old friend Lulu's wedding and arrives as She-Hulk to the reception. Walters expresses disappointment that Lulu wants her as just herself, not She-Hulk, and goes over pre-wedding duties; Walters also sees Titania, who was invited due to her dating one of the groomsmen. She bonds with Josh, a friend of the groom, before Titania attacks her and demands a fight. Transforming into She-Hulk, Walters fights until Titania breaks her veneers and leaves.

Meanwhile, Nikki Ramos and Mallory Book are assigned with the divorce case of Mister Immortal, who has apparently killed himself to get out of his marriages; Immortal's spouses all file suits against him after discovering a video of his apparent death on the website Intelligencia. Ramos works out a compensation deal for the eight spouses and discusses the aftermath with Book, but they see Intelligencia hate posts on Walters and She-Hulk; Ramos voicemails a warning. Elsewhere, scientists spy on Walters and plan an attempt to get a blood sample from her for someone named "HulkKing".

== Production ==
=== Development ===
In August 2019, Marvel Studios announced that She-Hulk: Attorney at Law was being developed for the streaming service Disney+. By December 2020, Anu Valia was hired to direct three episodes, including the sixth. Executive producers include Marvel Studios' Kevin Feige, Louis D'Esposito, Victoria Alonso, and Brad Winderbaum, in addition to lead director Kat Coiro, and head writer Jessica Gao. The sixth episode, titled "Just Jen", was written by Kara Brown, and was released on Disney+ on September 22, 2022. The episode's title card is altered to say Just Jen: Attorney at Law.

=== Writing ===
Valia enjoyed changing the expectations for the fight between She-Hulk and Titania, moving away from being "a big fight" to instead having Titania unable to continue because she has been humiliated after falling on her face. Valia continued, "That's really all it's about. It's not about [Titania] beating up She-Hulk. It's more like she feels so small and her veneer has been broken, quite literally. Because of that, she can't continue on... You really see her vulnerability and hopefully feel a bit sorry for her."

The episode introduces Intelligencia, a 4chan-style website that features hateful posts about Walters, with its members trying to find ways to kill her as well as working to get a sample of her blood. In the comics, the group Intelligencia is led by the Leader and MODOK, whose work leads to the creation of Hulk-related characters like Red Hulk, Red She-Hulk, A-Bomb, and Amadeus Cho.

=== Casting ===
The episode stars Tatiana Maslany as Jennifer Walters / She-Hulk, Jameela Jamil as Titania, Ginger Gonzaga as Nikki Ramos, Patti Harrison as Lulu, and Renée Elise Goldsberry as Mallory Book. Also starring are Nicholas Cirillo as Cousin Ched, Trevor Salter as Josh Miller, David Pasquesi as Craig Hollis / Mister Immortal, and McKenzie Kurtz as Heather.

=== Filming and visual effects ===
Filming occurred at Trilith Studios in Atlanta, Georgia, with Valia directing the episode, and Doug Chamberlain serving as cinematographer.

Visual effects for the series were created by Trixter, Wētā FX, Digital Domain, Wylie Co., Cantina Creative, FuseFX, SDFX Studios, Capital T, Keep Me Posted, and Lightstage.

=== Music ===
The following songs are featured in the episode: "The Vibes" by Sa-Fire, "Cash or Check" by Helmut Reinhardt, "Fist Bump" by Ken Elkinson, "Lark Quartet - Adagio Cantabile" by Joseph Haydn, "Minuet" by Abigail Trundle, "Walking on Broken Glass" by Annie Lennox, "All Nite Affair" by La Voyage, "Electric Boogie" by Marcia Griffiths, "Must Be the Love" by Daniel K. Solovitz, Chris B. Harris, and Brent I. Wesley, and "High Yah" by DJ Spinowitz.

== Marketing ==
A QR code was included in the episode that allowed viewers to access a free digital copy of West Coast Avengers #46, the first appearance of Mr. Immortal. After the episode's release, Marvel announced merchandise inspired by the episode as part of its weekly "Marvel Must Haves" promotion for each episode of the series, including She-Hulk accessories, jewelry, and apparel, along with She-Hulk by Titania and comic book-themed apparel.

== Reception ==
=== Viewership ===
According to market research company Parrot Analytics, which looks at consumer engagement in consumer research, streaming, downloads, and on social media, She-Hulk: Attorney at Law ranked among the top breakout shows for the week of September 24 to September 30, 2022, which are defined as the most in-demand series that have premiered in the past 100 days. It recorded a demand level of 31.6 times the average series. Whip Media, which tracks viewership data for the more than 21 million worldwide users of its TV Time app, calculated that it was the most-streamed original series the U.S. for the week ending September 25, 2022.

=== Critical response ===
The review aggregator website Rotten Tomatoes reports a 70% approval rating with an average rating of 7.00/10, based on 20 reviews. The site's critical consensus reads, "She-Hulk is content to have viewers spend time with "Just Jen" instead of getting back to more smashing story progression, which might be a mixed blessing in a wedding-themed episode that feels like amusing filler."

Arezou Amin at Collider gave the episode an "A–", saying it "managed to retain the lighthearted, weekly procedural format that has made the series work so well thus far" but was frustrated by how past episodes set up plot points that were not resolved immediately in the following episode, since it felt "a little jarring" with only nine episodes in the series. Amin enjoyed the storyline about Mr. Immortal, especially since it paired Ramos and Book together, while also feeling it was "difficult to really get a handle" on Titania's character and hoped the series did not "pivot into some kind of 'not like other girls' mentality" with her. Alex Stedman of IGN gave the episode a 7 out of 10, calling the wedding plot "another good catalyst" for showcasing how Walters feels about being She-Hulk. One of the best parts of the episode for Stedman was the return of Titania and her fight with She-Hulk, though she was disappointed with its ending since the comedy of that did not "live up" to the action. Giving the episode a "B+", Mary Kate Carr from The A.V. Club said "Just Jen" was a "steady improvement" over the previous episode. Highlights for Carr were the "awkward banter" between Walters and Josh and "Waking on Broken Glass" and "Electric Boogie" featured during the wedding. Writing for Gizmodo, Germain Lussier said "Just Jen" was "quite the episode. It both forwarded Jen's acceptance and embrace of her character, while also diving a bit more into how She-Hulk is being perceived in the world."

Den of Geek's Lacy Baugher was a bit disappointed that Matt Murdock did not show up in the episode after being teased at the end of the previous one, especially since she called "Just Jen" "one of the show's silliest half-hours to date... that has almost zero forward momentum when it comes to the larger stories this season is telling". However, the series "absolutely nails the awkwardness" of being a bridesmaid for an old high school friend despite not being fun to watch and being "aggressively cringe in a way that doesn't feel like character development". Baugher did not believe the appearance of Titania helped the story, given their rivalry up to this point has been "paper thin" and She-Hulk had not provided clearer motivations for why Titania was so obsessed with Walters. Baugher gave the episode 3.5 stars out of 5. The pairing of Ramos and Book in the side storyline was widely praised, with Baugher calling the storyline the series' "strongest yet".
