= The Retreat (She-Hulk: Attorney at Law) =

- She-Hulk: Attorney at Law episode
- The role of the therapy group in the episode, featuring several lesser-known comic book characters, received mixed responses.
- Episode no.: Episode 7
- Directed by: Anu Valia
- Written by: Zeb Wells
- Cinematography by: Doug Chamberlain
- Editing by: Stacey Schroeder
- Original release date: September 29, 2022
- Running time: 35 minutes

Cast
- Nick Gomez as Wrecker; Justin Eaton as Thunderball; Trevor Salter as Josh Miller; Nathan Hurd as Man-Bull; Joseph Castillo-Midyett as El Águila; Terrence Clowe as Saracen; John Piruccello as Chuck Donelan; Jordan Aaron Ford as Porcupine

Episode chronology
| ← Previous "Just Jen" | Next → "Ribbit and Rip It" |

"The Retreat" is the seventh episode of the American television series She-Hulk: Attorney at Law, based on Marvel Comics featuring the character She-Hulk. It follows Jennifer Walters as she spends a day at Emil Blonsky's wellness retreat and begins to embrace She-Hulk. The episode is set in the Marvel Cinematic Universe (MCU), sharing continuity with the films of the franchise. It was written by Zeb Wells and directed by Anu Valia.

Tatiana Maslany stars as Walters, alongside Ginger Gonzaga and Tim Roth (Blonsky). Valia joined the series by December 2020 to direct multiple episodes.

"The Retreat" was released on Disney+ on September 29, 2022.

== Plot ==
Jennifer Walters goes on several dates with Josh, but he disappears and seemingly ghosts her after they sleep together. While anticipating a text from him, she receives a call from Emil Blonsky's parole officer Chuck Donelan who informs her that the inhibitor that stops Blonsky from turning into Abomination is broken and that he wants her to accompany him to Blonsky's spiritual retreat Summer Twilight to check on him.

Chuck found that Blonsky's inhibitor suffered a glitch as Donelan fixes it. When Donelan leaves, Man-Bull and El Águila accidentally destroy her car during their scuffle, forcing her to stay there until it can be towed away by an approaching tow truck. Despite the retreat lacking internet and cell coverage, Walters continues to nervously await a response from Josh.

She attends a group therapy session with Blonsky, Man-Bull, El Águila, Porcupine, Saracen, and Wrecker of the Wrecking Crew (who Jen remembers from the attack on her). Jen is convinced to delete Josh's contact information and let go of her feelings towards him. She does so while riding a tow truck back to town.

Three days earlier, Josh secretly cloned Jen's phone and stole a sample of her blood on behalf of "HulkKing" after sleeping with her.

== Production ==
=== Development ===
In August 2019, Marvel Studios announced that She-Hulk: Attorney at Law was being developed for the streaming service Disney+. By December 2020, Anu Valia was hired to direct three episodes, including the seventh. Executive producers include Marvel Studios' Kevin Feige, Louis D'Esposito, Victoria Alonso, and Brad Winderbaum, in addition to lead director Kat Coiro and head writer Jessica Gao. The seventh episode, titled "The Retreat", was written by Zeb Wells, and was released on Disney+ on September 29, 2022.

=== Writing ===
Gao explained that when developing the series, they created the story of what Emil Blonsky's retreat would look like, describing it as "kind of a rehabilitation center... and therapy circle" for lesser-known villains; these included Wrecker, Man-Bull, El Águila, Saracen, and Porcupine. Gao explained these choices as ones that were "weirdo characters" with distinctive looks from the comics that "also had kind of enough of a strange theme to them" to create a group that contributed to "organized chaos". A number of other characters were also considered, such as Stilt-Man, Matador, and Varnae, but Porcupine was included from the beginning because the creatives all were enthused about his look from the comics and how that would be a positive for the series. Valia added that the theory circle in the episode's second act was "so different than what you're used to" from a Marvel Cinematic Universe (MCU) project.

=== Casting ===
The episode stars Tatiana Maslany as Jennifer Walters / She-Hulk, Ginger Gonzaga as Nikki Ramos, and Tim Roth as Emil Blonsky. Also starring are Nick Gomez as Wrecker, Justin Eaton as Thunderball, Trevor Salter as Josh Miller, Nathan Hurd as Man-Bull, Joseph Castillo-Midyett as El Águila, Terrence Clowe as Saracen, John Piruccello as Chuck Donelan, and Jordan Aaron Ford as Porcupine.

=== Filming and visual effects ===
Filming occurred at Trilith Studios in Atlanta, Georgia, with Valia directing the episode, and Doug Chamberlain serving as cinematographer. Discussing the episode's opening montage showing Walters and Miller going on their dates, Valia said she tried to capture the "excitement [that] this could be something" between them and to show the "subtlety of dating, and how vulnerable you are when you're dating". All elements of the montage were filmed over a few days with Valia trying to "uncomplicate" the material. Some of what was shot was Maslany and Salter driving in the car, with Valia choosing to sit in the backseat to film them; the intimacy of this filming with just the three of them made Valia, who has also directed indie films, feel as though "we were shooting a different film or something". Valia said filming the end of the episode, where it is shown that Miller captures footage of Walters in bed without her knowledge, was "incredibly uncomfortable".

Visual effects for the series were created by Digital Domain, Wylie Co., Trixter, Cantina Creative, FuseFX, SDFX Studio, Capital T, Keep Me Posted, and Lightstage.

=== Music ===
The following songs are featured in the episode: "Now I'm in It" by Haim, "MMMBop" by Hanson, "Peppers and Onion" by Tierra Whack, and "IDGAF" by Dua Lipa.

== Marketing ==
A QR code was included in the episode that allowed viewers to access a free digital copy of Tales to Astonish #48, the first appearance of Porcupine. After the episode's release, Marvel announced merchandise inspired by the episode as part of its weekly "Marvel Must Haves" promotion for each episode of the series, including necklaces, shirts, and other accessories.

== Reception ==
=== Viewership ===
According to market research company Parrot Analytics, which looks at consumer engagement in consumer research, streaming, downloads, and on social media, She-Hulk: Attorney at Law ranked as the third most in-demand series during this period among the top breakout shows, which are defined as the most in-demand series that have premiered in the past 100 days. It had a demand level of 32.3 times the average series for the week of October 1–7, 2022. The series experienced a growth in demand of less than 5% compared to the previous week. Nielsen Media Research, which records streaming viewership on U.S. television screen, reported that it was the ninth-most watched original series across streaming services for the week of September 26 – October 2, 2022, with 396 million minutes watched. Whip Media, which tracks viewership data for the more than 21 million worldwide users of its TV Time app, calculated that She-Hulk: Attorney at Law was the most-streamed original series in the U.S. for the week ending October 2, 2022.

=== Critical response ===
The review aggregator website Rotten Tomatoes reports an 84% approval rating with an average rating of 7.50/10, based on 19 reviews. The site's critical consensus reads, "Jennifer Walters finds herself in the company of D-list villains in an A-tier She-Hulk installment, with a goofy setup that leads to some profound revelations."

Lacy Baugher at Den of Geek gave the episode 4 stars out of 5, stating Blonsky's return "manages to feel like an organic part of the show's larger story" while the "weirdo combination" of characters at the retreat were "strangely charming" in a sequence that was "genuinely funny". Writing for The A.V. Club, Mary Kate Carr said "The Retreat" was "a perfectly pleasant episode", giving it a "B+". Alex Stedman at IGN said the episode was "one of She-Hulk's stronger episodes" with "a needed refresh" before the final few episodes. Particularly, she felt Maslany was "a perfect rom-com lead" during the opening dating montage, enjoyed the continued use of lesser-known characters for the mainstream audience to discover, and felt the mid-episode "previously on" was the series' "best uses of its fourth-wall-breaking yet". The group therapy scene was "fantastic" according to Stedman, with "one of the most emotionally resonant moments for Jen yet" which allowed Maslany to have her best acting moment of the series so far; she gave the episode an 8 out of 10.

Some reviewers found it odd that Walters was receiving emotional support from a group of men she does not know, rather than someone like Ramos or Augustus Pugliese, previously established characters shown to be her close friends. Reviewers also took issue with the final scene, particularly for it being disturbing and unsettling, and the fact that Miller took a non-consensual nude photo of Walters as she was sleeping. Collider's Amin Arezou, who gave the episode a "C+", said the episode "began to go off the rails" during the group therapy session, and felt the moment of Walters' acceptance between her two selves was "soured by the final scene" since it presented "a very real sort of horror" many females fear when first meeting a stranger, adding she did not feel the writers would have realized this scene could be horrifying to some audience members. Regarding the final scene, Baugher said it "takes an uncomfortable turn from uncomfortable and sadly disappointing to outright disturbing" and hoped the conversations around the episode would not "skip over what a violation those last few moments truly are" given "being photographed while vulnerable in that way... is an all-too-real threat to many women"; both Arezou and Baugher hoped the final two episodes of the series would address and deal with this moment.
