= Matt Murdock (Marvel Cinematic Universe) =

Character in the Marvel Cinematic Universe

- Marvel Cinematic Universe character
- Charlie Cox as Matt Murdock / Daredevil in The Defenders (2017)
- First appearance: "Into the Ring"; Daredevil; April 10, 2015
- Based on: Daredevil by: Stan Lee; Bill Everett
- Adapted by: Drew Goddard
- Portrayed by: Charlie Cox; Skylar Gaertner (young; Daredevil); Eli D. Goss (young; Born Again)

In-universe information
- Full name: Matthew Michael Murdock
- Aliases: Daredevil; The Devil of Hell's Kitchen
- Nickname: Matt
- Occupation: Lawyer; Vigilante
- Affiliation: Landman & Zack; Defenders; Nelson, Murdock & Page; Murdock & McDuffie
- Family: Jack Murdock (father); Maggie Grace (mother)
- Significant others: Elektra Natchios; Claire Temple; Karen Page; Jennifer Walters; Heather Glenn
- Religion: Catholic
- Origin: Hell's Kitchen, New York City, United States
- Nationality: Irish American
- Mentor: Stick
- Partners: Foggy Nelson; Karen Page; Kirsten McDuffie; Cherry Pitts

Matthew Michael Murdock is a fictional character primarily portrayed by Charlie Cox in the Marvel Cinematic Universe (MCU) media franchise, based on the Marvel Comics character of the same name—commonly known by his alias, Daredevil. In the MCU, Murdock is a lawyer by day who specializes in legal defense alongside his colleagues Foggy Nelson and Karen Page, while also aiding other superpowered individuals within New York City. He further pursues a personal crusade to inflict his own brand of justice at night, masquerading as a masked vigilante hoping to remove the corruption facing Hell's Kitchen following the Battle of New York from The Avengers (2012).

Murdock is blind, which with training enabled him to develop his other senses to superhuman levels. His activities would eventually bring him into conflict with enemies such as businessman Wilson Fisk, former FBI agent Benjamin Poindexter and The Hand organization in the process, the latter of which he combatted alongside the Defenders when they successfully resurrected and weaponized a former ally and lover from his past, Elektra Natchios. Following Fisk's defeat, Murdock returns to his law practice, successfully defending Peter Parker against criminal charges pressed against him as well as entering a brief romantic relationship with fellow superhuman lawyer Jennifer Walters. He would also come to the defense of and befriend other vigilantes, namely Frank Castle, Jessica Jones, Luke Cage, Danny Rand, Hector Ayala, Angela del Toro, and Jack Duquesne. Following Nelson being by murdered by Poindexter, Murdock retires as Daredevil, and Fisk is elected Mayor of New York City, leading a group of corrupt NYPD officers known as the Anti-Vigilante Task Force (AVTF). With Murdock resuming his role as Daredevil, he discovers the truth about Fisk's ambition to control all of New York and that his wife Vanessa Fisk was responsible for Nelson's death at Poindexter's hands, and decides to assemble a team to save the city. Murdock remains hidden and protecting civilians from Fisk's AVTF officers. After revealing his identity as Daredevil to the city to free Page from criminal charges, Murdock leads an army to confront Fisk and the AVTF, and convinces Fisk to resign. Murdock and Page attempt to move on with their lives, but Murdock is arrested and imprisoned for his actions as Daredevil.

As of 2025, the character has appeared in the Marvel Television series Daredevil (2015–2018), the miniseries The Defenders (2017), the Marvel Studios film Spider-Man: No Way Home (2021), and the Disney+ television series She-Hulk: Attorney at Law (2022), Echo (2024), and Daredevil: Born Again (2025–present). An alternate version of the character appears in the animated series Your Friendly Neighborhood Spider-Man (2025–present), with Cox reprising the role.

Cox's portrayal received significant praise critically and from fans, with the "#SaveDaredevil" campaign and petition being launched for his return after Daredevil's cancellation in 2018, which Cox attributed in October 2022 as having been responsible for his return to the role.

== Concept and creation ==
There was this issue of Daredevil, near the end of [writer-artist] Frank Miller's run, our hero is fighting with a professional assassin named Bullseye, on a wire. The bad guy starts to fall; Daredevil catches him. He has him by the hand, high above the city....and then he decides to let him go. Daredevil drops him to his death—or what he thinks is his death—because he doesn't ever want this guy to kill again. I remember reading that when I was a kid and thinking, Oh my god. When we started working on our show, that scene from the comics kept coming up. We all thought, this is a hero who is one bad day away from permanently crossing a line.

— Steven S. DeKnight on the version of Daredevil that he wanted to create.

The character Daredevil made his first appearance in his own self-titled issue, Daredevil #1 (April 1964), written by Stan Lee and art by Bill Everett with unspecified input provided by Jack Kirby, who devised Daredevil's billy club.

In 2013, Marvel Television and Disney announced that they would provide Netflix with television series centered around Daredevil, Jessica Jones, Luke Cage, Iron Fist, leading to the Defenders crossover miniseries. In May 2014, Charlie Cox was announced to portray Murdock, with Steven DeKnight being brought in to be the showrunner of the first season.

=== Casting ===
The idea of casting Cox as Daredevil came from Marvel's chief creative officer Joe Quesada in 2012, before Marvel Studios gained the rights to the character from 20th Century Fox. Cox wanted to be involved with the series after reading the first two scripts for Daredevil (2015), telling his agent "These are two of the best TV scripts I've read". Skylar Gaertner portrays a young Murdock in Daredevil.

Cox later explained that, unlike the Marvel comic book character, his version of Daredevil would not be a "man without fear", saying "Someone who does not have fear – literally does not experience fear – is not that interesting. The way I like to think about it is that he is a man with fear, but he on a daily basis decides to confront that fear and to overcome it. So the title of 'the man without fear' is almost a title that the public in his world gives him just because of what he does. But inside himself, he's very afraid at times. And he finds a way to confront those fears and punch through it." Cox "had to do a lot of gym work" to change his physique to equal that of the more muscular character as drawn in the comics.

=== Series cancellation and revival ===
In November 2018, Netflix cancelled the series after three seasons. Though the seasons would remain to stream on the service, the character would "live on in future projects for Marvel". Cox was saddened by the cancellation, since it "felt like we had a lot of stories to tell", especially since he had been excited by what had been discussed for a potential fourth season, adding that he was hopeful for an opportunity to portray the character again. Following the series' cancellation, fans launched a petition to revive the series with the "SaveDaredevil" hashtag. The petition amassed over 300,000 signatures.

In June 2020, Cox was unexpectedly contacted by Marvel Studios president Kevin Feige about reprising his role as Matt Murdock in the Marvel Cinematic Universe (MCU) projects Spider-Man: No Way Home and She-Hulk: Attorney at Law. Cox's return to the role was confirmed by Feige in December 2021. Jessica Henwick, who co-stars with Cox as Colleen Wing in The Defenders, indicated that he had known about the opportunity to reprise the role in a Marvel Studios production years prior. The writers of She-Hulk initially believed they would not have been able to feature the character in the series, and were eventually told by the studio that they were able to use the character. In October 2022, Cox explained that he approached Marvel Studios' Daredevil as the same character from the Netflix series, saying it "should be and is always", and Murdock changed to fit tonally, attributing his MCU return to the "#SaveDaredevil" campaign and petition later that month.

== Design ==
Matt Murdock disguised himself at night. One might say he also disguised himself during the day. Dark glasses or a mask always cover his eyes. The two looks have nothing in common on the face of it. However, consider that both are "uniforms" – practical, functional, and protective. Matt maintains a professional distance dressed as attorney. His vigilante uniform does much the same, although in disguise. He does his best not to get involved with the people he helps or who help him, with limited degrees of success.

— Costume designer Stephanie Maslansky on the ideas behind Murdock's lawyer and vigilante costumes.

Murdock's suits are differentiated more by texture than color, with a limited palette, "Because, obviously, he can't see his colors, but he has to know anything he chooses is going to coordinate with one another". Cox's size changed throughout the series as he continued to work out. Murdock begins the first season wearing a black costume (called the "vigilante outfit" by production), inspired by the one worn by the character in Frank Miller's and John Romita Jr's The Man Without Fear, rather than the more traditional red, horned suit. This was done to highlight the formation of Matt Murdock as Daredevil, with the costume evolving over time as the character develops. Quesada conceptualized the look based on DeKnight's specifications.

Maslansky noted that they wanted the outfit to "look like something that Matt Murdock could put together himself, that he could either order off the Internet or shop around town. ... I went to army/navy stores. I went online. I looked at athletic clothing, compression clothing, military stuff and construction stuff....we wound up with pretty practical choices for him. His shirts are compression shirts and his pants wound up being from an army/navy store". Concerning the black mask, Maslansky noted that a balance between aesthetic and safety was required, and that "It's made out of a cotton mesh. Layers and layers of it. It has to really conform to his head, but at the same time, he had to be able to see through it."

On the red suit that Murdock gets at the end of the first season, Maslansky said, "We wanted something that looked militaristic and functional, but also dramatic and sexy" adding that it was "tricky" making it practical. To begin the process of creating the suit, Quesada contacted Ryan Meinerding and the costume artists and design team at Marvel Studios, who all contributed design ideas, with one of Meinerding's ultimately being picked. Quesada, who previously worked as an artist on Daredevil comics, gave several suggestions, including the use of rivets and "architectural" shapes as a reference to the creation of New York City. The suit is intended to look like a Kevlar vest, and the black sections are an homage to comic panels where the artists highlighted certain areas with red, with "deeper portions" in shadow. On the mask, Meinerding noted the difficulty in designing the entire top half of a face that is intended to match the bottom half of an actor's face, "because half of his face has to be covered and has its own expression and the actor's face is going to be doing something else".

=== Evolution into Daredevil ===
Talking about why the traditional "DD" does not appear on Murdock's red suit, and other difficulties with adapting the suit to live action, DeKnight explained that "he got the suit before he got the name. We talked a lot about DD on the suit, which is one of the more problematic emblems in superhero-dom. It's a little wonky. His suit in the comics is very difficult to translate to screen, especially in this world that is grounded and gritty. There are some practical difficulties. The Daredevil outfit in the comics, his mask only covers half his nose. It doesn't come all the way down to the tip. We discovered when we were trying to design it that if you didn't bring it all the way down, you could clearly tell it was Charlie. Not only did we have the suspension of belief that nobody would know "hey, that's Matt Murdock" we also had the practical problem of it becoming almost impossible when it came to switching in and out our stunt double. So we had to make that adjustment".

In She-Hulk: Attorney at Law, Daredevil's costume is similar to the red one he wore in the Netflix series, but with an updated color scheme to include the yellow helmet and accents from the character's debut comics design in Daredevil #1. Marvel Studios had clear intentions as to what his costume would look like for the series.

== Characterization ==
DeKnight has explained that Murdock is "not super strong. He's not invulnerable... he just has senses that are better than a normal human's". On the character's "grey" morals, he noted, "He's a lawyer by day, and he's taken this oath. But every night he breaks that oath, and goes out and does very violent things". The character's Catholicism plays a large role in the series, with DeKnight calling him "one of the most, if not the most, religious characters in the Marvel Universe". Cox, who was raised Catholic, found that helpful, saying, "You grow up steeped in that. If you're in church, standing in front of the altar, you sort of automatically know how to respond. It all kicks in – you genuflect, you sit in the pew. I didn't have to pretend any of that". On how the name Daredevil is revealed in the series, DeKnight explained that "We talked about, do we do one of the versions in the comics where when he was a kid people used to taunt him with the name Daredevil, but that didn't quite feel like our world. At one point we were going to have Ben Urich (Vondie Curtis-Hall) give him the name, but the timing wasn't right from where he's in his black outfit and then gets his suit, which is after Ben's untimely demise. The solution was to play that off-screen and then hit it in the paper that he's been given this name Daredevil".

On portraying the character, Cox said, "There are so many aspects. There's the blindness and physicality. Making a show is about human emotion, conflict and turmoil. When meeting a man who's a lawyer by day and believes in law and justice and then a man by night is someone who takes the law into his own hands. He deals with battles dealing with that concept". Elaborating on the difficulties of playing the character, Cox said, "I put on a shirt but I can't look where the buttons are, because Daredevil wouldn't know where the buttons are, but I also can't fumble".

Cox worked with blind consultant Joe Strechay, and was conscious of what his eyes were doing at all times, to ensure they would not look at or react to something unlike a blind person. For The Defenders, Cox felt the second season—in which Murdock fought alongside Elektra Natchios and the Punisher– prepared the character to accept help in the series, and that moving into the miniseries the death of Natchios would be weighing heavily on Murdock. Ramirez likened Murdock and Natchios' relationship to a more overtly sexual version of Edward Norton and Brad Pitt's characters in Fight Club (1999), with Natchios being Murdock's "burden to deal with" after she is resurrected.

The ending of The Defenders implied elements of the third season would be inspired by the "Born Again" story arc, with Cox being excited to adapt "Born Again", calling it an "amazing story" and that the implications of the story on the season would be "very exciting". Season three showrunner Erik Oleson drew inspiration from both "Born Again" and "Guardian Devil" for the tone of the season, structurally building the season if any viewer was a "devout Catholic... you could read into the events of the early episodes as a message from God to Matt" and noting that Murdock would be "broken physically, broken emotionally, and broken spiritually" with his heightened senses failing him, adding that Murdock is "angry at God, angry at the fact he had risked his life to do God's work, and he's questioning whether or not he was a fool." This results in Murdock donning the black suit from season one, since he goes to "pretty much the darkest place you can" and is at a point where he's "incapable of being Daredevil, [and] he would rather just end it than go forward in his life without abilities."

For the character's appearance in She-Hulk: Attorney at Law, star Tatiana Maslany called Murdock and her character Jennifer Walters best friends, while lead director Kat Coiro said the two "match each other's wits". Head writer Jessica Gao stated that they have a commonality in both being lawyers who are also superheroes. By featuring Murdock in the series, the writers were allowed to have the character "play in the tone" of the series, which is a half-hour legal comedy, and explore a "lighter side" to him from his previous darker portrayals, such as in the Netflix series.

On Murdock's appearances in Spider-Man: No Way Home and She-Hulk, Cox explained: "It should be and it is always the same character. The difference is just like with people, we morph and change and are very different based on what's going on in our lives. The Matt Murdock from the Netflix show, that world and what was going on for Matt meant that most of the time we were living with a man who had a huge amount of pressure and strain and tonally the show was very dark and gritty and heavy. I don't know what [Daredevil: Born Again] will be like, but when I came over to do Spider-Man and She-Hulk, the tone is much more lighthearted and tongue in cheek and fun and witty and full of levity, so the hope was that Matt is able to fit into that world and participate in it without it being a different character, a different person."

== Appearances ==
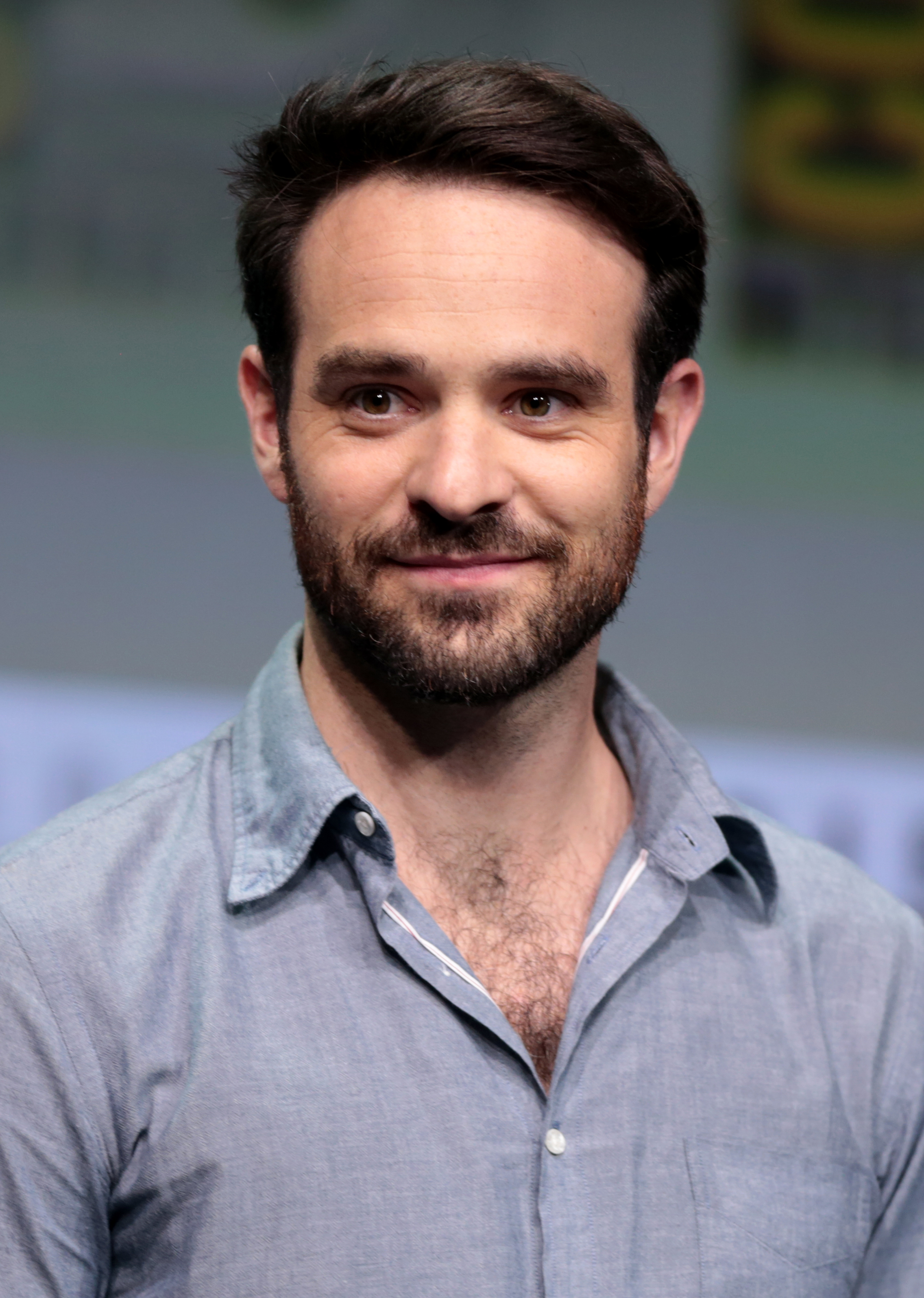
Charlie Cox at the 2017 San Diego Comic-Con

Matt Murdock / Daredevil first appears portrayed by Charlie Cox in two of the Netflix series produced by Marvel Television: Daredevil and The Defenders. Cox reprises the role in Marvel Studios productions, starting with the film Spider-Man: No Way Home and continuing with Disney+ series, including the She-Hulk: Attorney at Law episodes "Ribbit and Rip It" and "Whose Show Is This?" (2022), the Echo episode "Chafa" (2024), and Daredevil: Born Again (2025–present).

Cox also voices an alternate version of the character in the Your Friendly Neighborhood Spider-Man episodes "Duel with the Devil" and "If This Be My Destiny..." (2025).

== Fictional character biography ==
=== Early life ===
Matt Murdock was born to boxer Jack Murdock and nun Maggie Grace, who later abandoned them. As a child, Murdock was blinded in a car accident, heightening his other senses, training to "see" using his senses by an elderly and blind ninja, Stick. Murdock eventually attends Xavier High School, eventually graduating and going to Columbia Law School. There he meets and befriends Foggy Nelson and subsequently dates Elektra Natchios before breaking up. By 2015, Murdock and Nelson decide to open up their own law firm, Nelson and Murdock.

=== Becoming a vigilante ===
Shortly after opening the firm, Murdock and Nelson are appointed with Union Allied employee Karen Page being framed for murder. After clearing Page, Murdock begins fighting crime to protect Hell's Kitchen from corruption facing it following the Battle of New York, donning a costume consisting of a black mask and black suit and dubbed the "Masked Man" by the media, and "the devil of Hell's Kitchen" by some of the public and the criminal classes, though he rejects the latter when it is mentioned to him. His vigilantism brings him face-to-face with crime lord Wilson Fisk, a businessman who has interests in the city as the Kingpin.

Page and New York Bulletin reporter Ben Urich work to expose Fisk, while Murdock takes him down. During their final confrontation, Murdock, acknowledging his reputation as the 'devil', wears a new red, horned, and armoured suit built by Melvin Potter and modelled after the devil before fighting Fisk, defeating him and sending him to prison. Following the arrest, news media begins naming the vigilante Daredevil, which Murdock later adopts.

=== Clashing with the Punisher and the Hand ===
About six months later, Murdock, as Daredevil, investigates the cartels, learning that all their high-power weaponry has been stolen by one man. Daredevil confronts the man on a rooftop, but the man shoots him in the head. Though Murdock survives due to his body armor, Nelson insists that he rests and recovers. The man is nicknamed "the Punisher" by the DA's office, who is a deadly vigilante who lost his family. The two have a heated argument over Punisher's willingness to kill, while Murdock refuses to take lives due to his Catholic faith and belief in redemption. Daredevil captures the Punisher, whose real name is Frank Castle, but as a lawyer, represents him during The People vs. Frank Castle trial. Murdock’s old girlfriend Elektra Natchios returns, having become involved against the supervillain organization the Hand, fighting alongside her and Stick.

Murdock's covert operations disrupts his ability to work on the trial, and Castle is subsequently sent to Ryker's Island. Natchios, the escaped Castle, and Murdock work together to defeat the Hand, but Natchios dies in the process. On Christmas, Murdock reveals his vigilante identity to Page, and his legal partnership with Nelson dissolves due to Murdock's poor performance at the trial and Nelson's discomfort with his vigilante persona.

=== Forming the Defenders ===
Months after Natchios' death, Murdock practices as a pro bono lawyer while Nelson has become highly successful, and very busy, at the large firm of Hogarth, Chao & Benowitz. Thanks to Nelson's assistance, Murdock is dispatched at Jeri Hogarth's behest to represent her firm's investigator, Jessica Jones, after a man kills himself in her office. Jones continues her investigation into Midland Circle against Murdock's recommendation, and both end up reinforcing an escape attempt by Luke Cage and Danny Rand from the Hand. During the melee, Murdock fights the Black Sky, a powerful foe that he eventually recognizes as a resurrected Natchios.

Taking shelter at a restaurant along with Rand and Cage, Jones reveals to Murdock that she has deduced his vigilante persona. The four are joined by Stick, who explains the Hand's conflict with the Chaste and K'un L'un, in repelling the next attack. Cage captures Hand leader Sowande, who reveals the other part of their plan: use Rand's Iron Fist to access the dragon bones at the bottom of Midland Circle. The Black Sky finds their hideout, kills Stick and captures Rand, setting up their final conflict at Midland Circle, where the Defenders choose to demolish the building on top of the Hand, whose leadership the Black Sky has adopted upon recalling her past as Natchios. Murdock stays behind in an attempt to reconnect with Natchios as the building drops on them, and is presumed dead in the collapse.

=== Kingpin's return ===
Murdock, blown clear but badly hurt in the explosion at Midland Circle, washes into the New York sewer system, being found by a taxi driver and delivered to Father Paul Lantom, who entrusts Murdock to the care of Grace, later discovering she is his mother. As he slowly recovers his health and his powers, Murdock has a crisis of faith and decides to continue as Daredevil. After Fisk manipulates the FBI to release him from prison, Murdock investigates the Presidential Hotel, but begins to hallucinate him as a "devil on his shoulder". Murdock interrogates Fisk's lawyer Benjamin Donovan and learns of the situation with Vanessa Marianna. However, Fisk has already deduced that Murdock is Daredevil and sets an ambush at the jail Murdock visits for information, setting the FBI on his civilian identity, and using an unhinged FBI agent, Benjamin Poindexter, as a fake Daredevil to discredit his vigilante identity.

Murdock resolves to kill Fisk to relieve New York and the FBI from his grasp, but hearing that Page is to be assassinated diverts him to save her, with Lantom dying in the crossfire. His last-ditch legal effort with lead Agent Ray Nadeem testifying fails when the jury is found compromised and Nadeem is executed by Poindexter. With few leads remaining, he discovers Fisk's fixer Felix Manning, who gives him enough information to turn Poindexter against Fisk and implicate Vanessa's involvement in Nadeem's death. Murdock sets a rabid Poindexter to crash Fisk's wedding with Fisk paralyzing Poindexter and Murdock nearly killing Fisk before relenting. Fisk agrees to return to prison and leave Page and Nelson alone if Murdock does not expose Vanessa. With Fisk arrested using Nadeem's dying declaration, Murdock begins redeveloping his relationship with Nelson and Page, and they begin a new law firm together.

=== Meeting other heroes ===
In 2018, Murdock survives the Blip. In 2021, he encounters Fisk's men and Maya Lopez at a stakeout and fights Lopez briefly.

In 2024, Murdock gets all charges against Peter Parker dropped, after his identity as Spider-Man was exposed by Quentin Beck, who posthumously framed Parker for his death. Murdock warns him that it will not cause a shift in public opinion on Spider-Man. He also advises Parker's associate Happy Hogan to secure legal protection due to a federal investigation into the Stark Industries technology that had been involved in Parker's fight with Beck, and months later, represents Hogan against Department of Damage Control agents.

In 2025, Murdock visits Los Angeles to defend his tailor Luke Jacobson against Jennifer Walters in a product liability suit brought about by her client, Eugene Patilio. While talking with Walters at a bar, Murdock learns Patilio kidnapped Jacobson and pursues him as Daredevil. He encounters Walters as She-Hulk, and after his identity is revealed, joins forces with her to free Jacobson. That night, Murdock sleeps with Walters at her apartment. A week later, Murdock meets Walters' family, including her cousin Bruce Banner, and Banner's son, Skaar, at a barbecue.

=== Tragedy, retirement and return ===
In late 2025, Murdock, Nelson, and Page are celebrating their friend Cherry Pitts's retirement at Josie's bar when they are attacked by Poindexter, who kills Nelson and ten other civilians. An enraged Murdock attempts to kill Poindexter by throwing him off a roof, but he survives. One year later, a still-grieving Murdock has retired from vigilantism, distanced himself from Page, formed a new law firm with former district attorney Kirsten McDuffie, and begun dating therapist Heather Glenn. When Fisk, who has been acquitted following the FBI corruption scandal, announces he is running for mayor of New York City, Murdock warns him that he will stop him if he abuses his power. Fisk is ultimately elected.

In 2027, Murdock defends Hector Ayala, who is arrested after defending a man from two corrupt police officers. After a key witness is intimidated into silence, Murdock is forced to reveal Ayala's identity as the vigilante White Tiger in court. The jury finds Ayala not guilty, but he is later murdered. Finding a bullet casing with the Punisher's symbol at the crime scene, Murdock confronts Castle, who denies involvement and chastises Murdock for not killing Poindexter. Murdock returns as Daredevil to rescue Ayala's niece Angela del Toro and Glenn from the serial killer Muse, who ends up being fatally shot by the latter. Fisk learns of Daredevil's return and publicly credits his Anti-Vigilante Task Force (AVTF), a team consisting of corrupt officers, for stopping Muse.

When Poindexter is moved to gen pop on Fisk's orders, Murdock interrogates him, believing Fisk hired him to kill Nelson. Glenn, who is Fisk and Vanessa's marriage counselor, is invited to Fisk's ball, where Murdock realizes it was Vanessa who hired Poindexter. Murdock protects Fisk from a bullet fired by Poindexter, who has escaped from prison, and is hospitalized. He avoids a murder attempt by Fisk's right-hand man Buck Cashman and flees to his apartment, finding Castle. Both fight AVTF officers, including Ayala's murderer Cole North, whom Murdock resists killing. They reunite with Page, who asked Castle to protect Murdock. After leaving Castle, Murdock and Page track down Nelson's case and discover that the Fisks are trying to establish a city-state. As Fisk declares martial law and outlaws vigilantism, Murdock recruits trusted police officers to help him stop Fisk.

=== Forming the Resistance ===
Six months later, Murdock and Page have rekindled their romantic relationship and hide in Josie's bar. Murdock infiltrates a cargo ship and discovers a shipment of military-grade weapons destined for Fisk's Red Hook Freeport. After the ship is sunk, Page and Murdock find BB Urich and Cherry separately to gather information and locate the crew of the ship. When the AVTF attacks Cherry, Murdock arrives to save him before the agents are killed by Poindexter. Fisk issues a missing person warrant for Murdock for saving his life; Murdock knows this could make it difficult for him to be seen in public as himself and Daredevil and to infiltrate Red Hook. Murdock and Page are attacked by the AVTF at their hideout. After Murdock defeats the officers, one of them, Alan Saunders, offers to help Murdock and Page by giving them his Red Hook security card to leak a copy of a statute to Governor Marge McCaffrey, which would allow her to revoke Fisk's access to Red Hook. With McDuffie's help, Murdock breaks into Red Hook and discovers the AVTF prisoners, freeing them with help from Jack Duquesne, Page, and Angela.

Murdock locates and confronts Poindexter, demanding he pay for Nelson's death, but Poindexter escapes and Murdock pursues him to the public boxing match at Fogwell's Gym, where Fisk is located. Murdock arrives to save Poindexter, who is wounded while trying to kill Vanessa, and they both escape. Murdock helps a wounded Poindexter escape from the AVTF. They hide in the Clinton Church and remembering Nelson's selflessness, Murdock decides to save Poindexter, taking him to his hideout with Page to help him recover. Murdock and Jones attack the AVTF's weapons depot. Upon returning, Murdock stops Page from killing Poindexter. They get into an argument about Murdock’s continued reluctance to kill as they part ways. Murdock sneaks into Fisk's hideout and offers to make peace with him if they both leave New York. When Fisk refuses, he and Murdock fight, and Murdock wins, but again refrains from killing Fisk.

Murdock learns that Page has been captured by the AVTF. Murdock frees Poindexter and makes him a deal to save McCaffrey, who is to be assassinated by a spy sent by Fisk. Murdock realizes he can help Page by attending the trial as her lawyer, assisting McDuffie. After Cherry and other police allies protect him and McDuffie, Murdock neutralizes the AVTF, but is wounded and escapes, arriving at Clinton Church, where he reunites with Jones. Murdock returns to the trial, reuniting with Page and McDuffie, and also encounters Fisk, Glenn, Cashman, and their AVTF officers. With witnesses like Jones and McCaffrey, Murdock gets Fisk to tell the whole truth about his crimes. After Murdock reveals his identity as Daredevil to drop the charges against Page, he knows this isn't over with Fisk. Seeing Cashman wounded by Poindexter, Murdock seizes the opportunity to escape with Page, Jones, McDuffie, and McCaffrey. After seeing BB's announcement against Fisk, Murdock, Jones, and Angela arrive at the courthouse, confronting the AVTF, until they reach Fisk, who is surrounded by Daredevil's army. Murdock finally offers Fisk the chance to resign as mayor and leave New York, and they make a deal. After a date with Page, Murdock surrenders to the police for his years of vigilante activities as Daredevil, being arrested and taken to prison.

== Alternate versions ==
Other versions of Murdock are depicted in the alternate realities of the MCU multiverse.

=== The Void ===
In an alternate universe, Murdock and Elektra Natchios were pruned by the Time Variance Authority to the Void. The two join a resistance force against Cassandra Nova with Remy LeBeau, Blade, Johnny Storm, Laura, Peter Maximoff, Erik Lehnsherr and Frank Castle, all from different universes. During a battle against Nova, Murdock was killed alongside Castle, Lehnsherr and Maximoff.

This version is implied to be the incarnation portrayed by Ben Affleck in the film Daredevil (2003) and deleted scenes from its spin-off Elektra (2005), but never explicitly stated.

=== Infiltrating Oscorp ===
In an alternate 2016, Daredevil breaks into Oscorp tower. He gets to the rooftop and engages in a brief fight with Spider-Man, informing him that Norman Osborn is hiding something sinister, and eventually knocks Parker unconscious as he escapes. Jeanne Foucault / Finesse, posing as an intern, works with Daredevil to infiltrate Oscorp and spy on Osborn.

== Reception ==
=== Critical response ===
Brian Lowry of Variety praised Cox's portrayal of the character, while Mike Hale, writing for The New York Times, called Cox's performance as "divided", praising him as Murdock but criticizing him as Daredevil. IndieWire's Liz Shannon Miller, reviewing season one, praised the performances of the cast, especially D'Onofrio, Curtis-Hall, and Cox.

=== Accolades ===
Year	Works	Award	Category	Result	Ref.
2015	Daredevil	American Foundation for the Blind	Helen Keller Achievement Award	Honoree	
2016	Daredevil	Saturn Awards	Best Actor on Television	Nominated	
2017	Daredevil	Saturn Awards	Best Actor on Television	Nominated	
2019	Daredevil	Saturn Awards	Best Actor in Streaming Presentation	Nominated	
2025	Daredevil: Born Again	Astra TV Awards	Best Actor in a Drama Series	Nominated	
2025	Daredevil: Born Again	Critics' Choice Super Awards	Best Actor in a Superhero Series, Limited Series or Made-for-TV Movie	Nominated	

== See also ==
- Characters of the Marvel Cinematic Universe
  - List of Daredevil characters
  - List of The Defenders characters
