= She-Hulk: Attorney at Law =

2022 Marvel Studios television miniseries

- Genre: Action-adventure; Comedy; Legal drama; Science fiction; Superhero
- Created by: Jessica Gao
- Based on: Marvel Comics
- Starring: Tatiana Maslany; Jameela Jamil; Ginger Gonzaga; Mark Ruffalo; Josh Segarra; Mark Linn-Baker; Tess Malis Kincaid; Tim Roth; Megan Thee Stallion; Benedict Wong; Renée Elise Goldsberry; Jon Bass; Rhys Coiro; Griffin Matthews; Patti Harrison; Steve Coulter; Charlie Cox; Brandon Stanley; Drew Matthews
- Music by: Amie Doherty
- Country of origin: United States
- Original language: English
- No. of seasons: 1
- No. of episodes: 9

Production
- Executive producers: Kevin Feige; Louis D'Esposito; Victoria Alonso; Brad Winderbaum; Kat Coiro; Jessica Gao; Wendy Jacobson
- Production location: Atlanta
- Cinematography: Florian Ballhaus; Doug Chamberlain
- Editors: Jamie Gross; Stacey Schroeder; Zene Baker; Tim Roche
- Running time: 30–38 minutes
- Production company: Marvel Studios

Original release
- Network: Disney+
- Release: August 18 – October 13, 2022

Related
- Marvel Cinematic Universe television series

She-Hulk: Attorney at Law is an American television miniseries created by Jessica Gao for the streaming service Disney+, based on Marvel Comics featuring the character She-Hulk. It is the eighth television series in the Marvel Cinematic Universe (MCU) produced by Marvel Studios, sharing continuity with the films of the franchise. It follows Jennifer Walters, a lawyer specializing in cases involving superhumans, who is also the green superhero She-Hulk. Gao served as head writer and Kat Coiro led the directing team.

Tatiana Maslany stars as Jennifer Walters / She-Hulk alongside Jameela Jamil, Ginger Gonzaga, Mark Ruffalo, Josh Segarra, Mark Linn-Baker, Tess Malis Kincaid, Tim Roth, Megan Thee Stallion, Benedict Wong, Renée Elise Goldsberry, Jon Bass, Rhys Coiro, Griffin Matthews, Patti Harrison, Steve Coulter, Charlie Cox, Brandon Stanley, and Drew Matthews. She-Hulk was announced in August 2019 and Gao was hired that November. Coiro joined to direct multiple episodes in September 2020. In December, Maslany's casting was officially announced and Anu Valia was hired to direct multiple episodes. Filming took place in Atlanta, Georgia, from April to August 2021.

She-Hulk: Attorney at Law premiered on August 18, 2022, and ran for nine episodes until October 13. It is the last television series of Phase Four in the MCU. The series received generally positive reviews from critics, with particular praise for Maslany's performance, though reception to the series' visual effects was mixed. It was one of Marvel Studios' best-performing series in terms of viewership, doing well with general audiences.

== Premise ==
Jennifer Walters has a complicated life as a single attorney in her 30s who also becomes the 6-foot-7-inch (2.01-meter) green superhero She-Hulk.

== Cast and characters ==
- Tatiana Maslany as Jennifer Walters / She-Hulk:
  A lawyer for the firm Goodman, Lieber, Kurtzberg & Holliway (GLK&H) who specializes in cases involving superhumans and becomes a large 6-foot-7-inch (2.01-meter), powerful, green-hued version of herself, similar to her cousin Bruce Banner, after accidentally getting cross-contaminated with his blood. Maslany called the character "the antithesis of most superhero narratives" since Walters does not want her abilities. She continued that Walters has a "great element of denial in her that's relatable", and Maslany tried to reject the changes in the character for as long as she could to create a "fun tension" between Walters and She-Hulk. Maslany was also inspired by the music of Sophie, which she described as a combination of "organic and electrical, industrial-type sounds that felt connected to She-Hulk". She also liked the duality of a "woman occupying two different bodies", especially since modern-day culture has an obsession with a woman's body and felt the commentary from the series was "very prescient" and "rife with interesting nuance". The character Elaine Benes from Seinfeld (1989–1998) served as a "touchstone" for Maslany. Head writer Jessica Gao wanted to create a character that had a "well-rounded life" that then has to deal with the unexpected addition of super powers to her life, exploring her emotional and mental response. 6-foot-5-inch (1.96-meter) Maliah Arrayah served as the on-set reference and body double for She-Hulk. Director Kat Coiro and Maslany were able to learn how Arrayah "moved through the world" at her height as well as the struggles she faced. Arrayah wore a muscle suit on set. Devon Lewis was another stand-in for She-Hulk, appearing as the Savage She-Hulk in the finale's opening sequence.
- Jameela Jamil as Mary MacPherran / Titania:
  A social media influencer with incredible strength who is obsessed with She-Hulk, ultimately becoming her rival. Gao wanted to modernize the character and give her "a little more complexity", gravitating towards being interested in social media and maintaining her brand. Jamil described the character as annoying and weird, stating that she "almost doesn't need to use her strength; she could just annoy you to death". She added that the character is "all narcissism and ego" who believes herself to be the strongest woman in the world before being publicly humiliated by She-Hulk, which makes Titania hold a grudge against She-Hulk. The accent Jamil uses for Titania was described as a "very influencer [Los Angeles] accent", which she felt added a "flare of ridiculous" to the already "cartoonish" quality of the character. Though the character's backstory is not featured in She-Hulk, Jamil looked to the one from the comics to inform her performance, particularly for Titania's insecurity. Titania is not featured prominently in the early episodes of the series because the writers "wanted to seed her in there" as a way to "preserve" from the comics how she is "this gnat that was always buzzing around She-Hulk" to take her down and never trying to attempt outright destruction. Additionally, this allowed the audience to "really get to know" the other characters before she returns. Jamil trained in jiu-jitsu, kickboxing, and kung fu for the part.
- Ginger Gonzaga as Nikki Ramos:
  A paralegal and Walters' best friend. She helps Walters "let loose and color outside the lines", with Maslany noting Nikki "reminds her that there is a life outside of her job" and that She-Hulk can be "embrace[d]" and "part of her identity as well". Gonzaga said Nikki has a "sardonic personality" and does not aspire to be an attorney since she enjoys being a rule breaker. The character is queer, with Gonzaga believing Nikki was bisexual. Gonzaga said Nikki would "love anyone", had a "secret crush" on Mallory Book, and lived "a very free life". After Gonzaga was cast, the part was rewritten to more resemble Gonzaga and her personality.
- Mark Ruffalo as Bruce Banner / Smart Hulk:
  An Avenger, genius scientist, and Walters' cousin who, because of exposure to gamma radiation, typically transforms into a monster when enraged or agitated, but has since managed to balance his two sides with gamma experimentation, enabling him to combine his intelligence with the Hulk's strength and physical stature. Living off the grid in Mexico, Banner decides to train Walters to become a superhero, starting from "a predisposed idea that her experience is going to be exactly the same as his", ultimately realizing that her experience is different "physically, literally, and mentally because of how they have operated differently in the world as men and women". Coiro enjoyed seeing Banner "get completely thrown off his game" in teaching Walters and realizing she is able to also teach him, with Ruffalo adding Banner is excited to have another person now who can relate to being a Hulk.
- Josh Segarra as Augustus "Pug" Pugliese:
  A member of the legal team at GLK&H, who works with Walters and Nikki. Segarra said that Pugliese cares for his co-workers since they "make him part of their family", and is supportive of Walters when she is She-Hulk or not.
- Mark Linn-Baker as Morris Walters: Walters' father.
- Tess Malis Kincaid as Elaine Walters: Walters' mother.
- Tim Roth as Emil Blonsky / Abomination:
  A Russian-born former officer in the United Kingdom's Royal Marines who had combined a modified version of the super soldier serum and gamma radiation to transform into a humanoid monster similar to the Hulk following experimental treatment. He is one of Walters' clients, who becomes the owner of the wellness retreat Summer Twilights after reforming. Coiro described Blonsky as "very tricky character—he's not necessarily to be trusted and you get the feeling that he's a con artist". Because the character was taken in "a very different direction" from Roth's first portrayal in The Incredible Hulk (2008), he did not approach the role as a reprisal of the character but rather finding a new version to "play around in that". Roth enjoyed being able to improvise with the character and exploring his truthfulness and whether he was truly reformed.
- Megan Thee Stallion as a fictionalized version of herself who becomes one of Walters' clients. Stallion also appears as Runa impersonating her.
- Benedict Wong as Wong:
  The Sorcerer Supreme who previously participated in a cage fighting tournament with Blonsky as part of his training. Gao enjoyed having Wong be "fun and be part of a silly thing where the universe isn't at stake" on the series compared to his past performances where he was more dramatic.
- Renée Elise Goldsberry as Mallory Book:
  A lawyer at GLK&H who is threatened by Walters becoming the new head of the superhuman law division. Goldsberry said that Book has a lot of pressure on her to achieve perfection, and after initially seeing Walters as a threat, Book finds "some value" in a relationship with her after seeing her humanity.
- Jon Bass as Todd Phelps / HulkKing:
  A misogynistic billionaire who goes on a date with Walters. He is also "HulkKing", the creator of Intelligencia, an online hate forum targeted at She-Hulk that is trying to acquire her blood. Bass described Phelps as a "billionaire playboy philanthropist douchebag" who is looking to emulate Tony Stark "but comes off as Jon Bass", adding that Phelps "is used to getting whatever he wants, but he's a total creep who starts popping up everywhere". Co-executive producer Wendy Jacobson said the character was social commentary on misogyny, cancel culture, and the "unfair views of women". Bass felt it was "pretty easy" to portray Phelps without any extensive research because it is "right there in our culture". He also provided motion-capture for when Phelps turns into a Hulk.
- Rhys Coiro as Donny Blaze:
  A magician and former student of the Mystic Arts who works at Mystic Castle. Coiro said that Criss Angel and David Blaine were "the prototypes" used to inspire the character.
- Griffin Matthews as Luke Jacobson: A fashion designer specializing in superhero suits, who builds a new wardrobe for Walters for when she transitions to and from her She-Hulk form.
- Patti Harrison as Lulu: Walters' old friend from high school who invites her to be a bridesmaid at her wedding.
- Steve Coulter as Holden Holliway: A partner at GLK&H and Walters' boss.
- Charlie Cox as Matt Murdock / Daredevil:
  A blind lawyer with superhuman senses from Hell's Kitchen, New York who leads a double life as a masked vigilante. Maslany called Walters and Murdock best friends, while Coiro said the two "match each other's wits". Gao stated that they have a commonality in both being lawyers who are also superheroes. The writers initially believed they would not have been able to feature the character in the series, and were eventually told the studio was able to use the character, with Cox returning to the role from Marvel Television's Netflix series following a cameo appearance in Spider-Man: No Way Home (2021). Featuring Murdock in the series allowed the writers to have the character "play in the tone" of the series and explore a "lighter side" to him from his darker portrayals previously, while still being faithful to the character as he appears in the comics.
- Brandon Stanley as Eugene Patilio / Leap-Frog: The son of a rich GLK&H client who tries to become a crime fighter in a frog-themed costume.
- Drew Matthews as Dennis Bukowski: A lawyer with the Los Angeles County District Attorney's office and Walters' former co-worker.

Guest stars include Nicholas Cirillo as Ched, Walters' cousin, Peg O'Keef as Runa, a shape-shifting Light Elf from New Asgard who defrauded Bukowski by impersonating Megan Thee Stallion, Patty Guggenheim as Madisynn King, a drunken victim of Blaze's magic who becomes Wong's friend, Leon Lamar as Cornelius P. Willows, Blaze's sidekick and the curator of Mystic Castle, David Otunga as Derek, one of Walters' dates, and Trevor Salter as Josh Miller, a member of Intelligencia who dates Walters in order to steal a sample of her blood for Phelps. Brian T. Delaney provides the uncredited voice of K.E.V.I.N. (Knowledge Enhanced Visual Interconnectivity Nexus), an artificial intelligence in charge of the Marvel Cinematic Universe's story decisions; the character is a reference to Marvel Studios president Kevin Feige. Feige was asked to voice K.E.V.I.N., but he declined. Gao and fellow series' writers Zeb Wells and Cody Ziglar have cameo appearances in the season.

Comic characters introduced in the series include: the Wrecking Crew, a four-man criminal group wielding stolen enhanced Asgardian construction tools as weapons with its members including Nick Gomez as Wrecker, Justin Eaton as Thunderball, Tennison Barry III as Bulldozer, and Kyle Murillo as Piledriver; David Pasquesi as Craig Hollis / Mister Immortal, a superhuman incapable of dying who goes to GLK&H to help him settle the divorces of his many spouses; Nathan Hurd as Man-Bull, a human/cattle hybrid who gained his appearance from a science experiment gone wrong; Joseph Castillo-Midyett as El Águila, a self-proclaimed swashbuckler who is capable of generating electrical blasts through objects; Terrence Clowe as Saracen, a man who claims that he is a vampire; Jordan Aaron Ford as Porcupine, an individual who continually wears a costume reminiscent of a porcupine; and Wil Deusner provides motion-capture for Skaar, Banner's son from Sakaar who also inherited his Hulk powers.

== Episodes ==
No.	Title	Directed by	Written by	Original release date
1	"A Normal Amount of Rage"	Kat Coiro	Jessica Gao	August 18, 2022
Before a court case, lawyer Jennifer Walters tells the viewers about an incident a few months earlier where she and her cousin Bruce Banner were in a car crash after an encounter with a Sakaaran spacecraft. While attempting to get Banner to safety, Walters was cross-contaminated with his blood, causing her to transform into a Hulk. Banner took Walters to a secret laboratory in Mexico, where he trained her to control her new powers. She was able to effortlessly handle his training regimen, but she rejected the idea of becoming a superhero full-time. Banner tried to stop her from leaving, and the two fought until Banner reluctantly accepted Walters' wish to return to her legal career. Back in court, Walters is interrupted by superpowered influencer Titania, who violently bursts through a wall while fleeing from her own trial. Walters transforms, defeats Titania, and returns to normal to make her closing argument.
2	"Superhuman Law"	Kat Coiro	Jessica Gao	August 25, 2022
Walters gains public notoriety after defeating Titania and is dubbed "She-Hulk". However, the case is declared a mistrial after the defense successfully argued that her fight with Titania influenced the jury, and she is fired from the district attorney's office. Unable to find other work, Walters is offered a position by opposing counsel Goodman, Lieber, Kurtzberg & Holliway (GLK&H) and impulsively accepts, bringing along her best friend Nikki Ramos as her paralegal. On Walters' first day, GLK&H partner Holden Holliway informs her that he wants her to head up the firm's new superhuman law division and work as She-Hulk full-time. Her first case is to represent Emil Blonsky / Abomination at his parole hearing. Though initially reluctant due to Blonsky's past attempt to kill Banner, (Note: As depicted in The Incredible Hulk (2008).) Walters gets Banner's approval and accepts the case as he departs inside a Sakaaran spacecraft. Walters soon learns that Blonsky apparently escaped from prison and participated in an underground fight club. (Note: As depicted in Shang-Chi and the Legend of the Ten Rings (2021).)
3	"The People vs. Emil Blonsky"	Kat Coiro	Francesca Gailes & Jacqueline J. Gailes	September 1, 2022
Walters confronts Blonsky, who explains that he was removed from his cell by the Sorcerer Supreme Wong and that he returned to prison willingly afterwards. While she attempts to contact Wong, news of her appointment as Blonsky's lawyer stirs up public controversy. Wong meets with Walters and agrees to testify at Blonsky's parole hearing, during which Blonsky demonstrates his ability to remain in control as the Abomination. Blonsky is released on parole, but forbidden from transforming again. Meanwhile, Walters' former colleague Dennis Bukowski approaches the superhuman law division for a case involving his ex-girlfriend Runa, a shape-shifting Light Elf from New Asgard who defrauded him by impersonating Megan Thee Stallion. The case is assigned to Walters' coworker Augustus "Pug" Pugliese, and Walters helps Pug win the case. After participating in a televised interview, Walters is attacked by the Wrecking Crew, a four-man criminal group consisting of the Wrecker, Piledriver, Bulldozer, and Thunderball who are armed with stolen Asgardian construction tools and were hired by an anonymous client to steal a sample of her blood, but Walters is able to overpower them.
4	"Is This Not Real Magic?"	Kat Coiro	Melissa Hunter	September 8, 2022
Donny Blaze, a magician at Mystic Castle who was expelled from Kamar-Taj for misusing his powers, sends an audience member named Madisynn King to another dimension, where she makes a deal with a demon before being transported to Wong's home in Kamar-Taj. Wong approaches Walters and asks for her help in making an example of Blaze so that people like him will not be able to misuse the Mystic Arts, so they file a suit against Blaze and Mystic Castle's curator Cornelius P. Willows. Meanwhile, Walters creates a profile on a dating app in the hopes of expanding her social life, but has little success until she changes it into a profile for She-Hulk. Blaze accidentally unleashes a swarm of demons at one of his shows, but Wong and Walters send them back before threatening Blaze and Willows into complying with a cease-and-desist order. The next day, Walters learns that Titania has been freed and is filing a lawsuit against her, having trademarked the name "She-Hulk".
5	"Mean, Green, and Straight Poured into These Jeans"	Anu Valia	Dana Schwartz	September 15, 2022
Titania has trademarked the name "She-Hulk" for a new line of beauty products, which angers Walters. Holliway warns Walters that she needs to deal with the situation quickly, and assigns Mallory Book as her attorney for the case. Nikki and Pug come up with a plan to acquire a superhero outfit for Walters from Luke Jacobson, a highly exclusive tailor who provides clandestine services for heroes, while Book and Walters counter-sue Titania, claiming that she is illegally exploiting She-Hulk's fame for profit. Walters is annoyed to discover that Todd Phelps, one of her unsuccessful dates, is also a client at her firm, but this helps her realize that she can use her dating app history to establish a past record of her identifying as She-Hulk before Titania tried to gain the trademark. Using her past dates' testimonies, Walters wins the case and establishes a tentative friendship with Book. Walters later acquires her new customized outfits from Jacobson.
6	"Just Jen"	Anu Valia	Kara Brown	September 22, 2022
Walters is invited to be a bridesmaid at her old friend Lulu's wedding. When she arrives, however, she is disappointed to find that Lulu wants her to present as herself, not She-Hulk, and saddles her with numerous pre-wedding duties. Titania is also present as she is dating one of Lulu's groomsmen. Walters bonds with Josh Miller, a friend of the groom, but Titania attacks her. Following a brief fight, Titania breaks down and storms off. Meanwhile, Book and Nikki work on a divorce case for a superhuman called "Mister Immortal", who has repeatedly faked his death to get out of several marriages. Compounding the problem, eight of his previous spouses all file suits against him upon learning his secret via an online video displaying his powers leaked by a website called Intelligencia. After resolving the case, Book and Nikki discover several death threats directed at She-Hulk on Intelligencia's message board, which is maintained by an individual known as "HulkKing". Elsewhere, scientists working for "HulkKing" spy on Walters and plan another attempt to steal a blood sample from her.
7	"The Retreat"	Anu Valia	Zeb Wells	September 29, 2022
Walters goes on several dates with Miller, but he disappears and seemingly ghosts her after they sleep together. While anticipating a text from him, she receives a call from Blonsky's parole officer who informs her that the inhibitor that stops Blonsky from turning into Abomination is broken and that he wants her to accompany him to Blonsky's spiritual retreat Summer Twilight to check on him. When the officer leaves, Man-Bull and El Águila accidentally destroy her car, forcing her to stay there until it can be towed away. Despite the retreat lacking internet and cell coverage, Walters continues to nervously await a response from Miller. She attends a group therapy session with Blonsky, Man-Bull, El Águila, Porcupine, Saracen, and Wrecker, where she is convinced to delete Miller's contact information and let go of her feelings towards him. It is revealed that three days earlier, Miller secretly cloned Walters' phone and stole a sample of her blood on behalf of "HulkKing" after sleeping with her.
8	"Ribbit and Rip It"	Kat Coiro	Cody Ziglar	October 6, 2022
Walters takes on a new case, representing Eugene Patilio / Leap-Frog, who wishes to sue Jacobson for giving him a faulty supersuit. Jacobson is represented by Matt Murdock in court and wins the case due to Patilio inadvertently revealing that he disobeyed Jacobson's instructions by using jet fuel in his boosters. Afterwards, Patilio contacts Walters asking for help against an unknown assailant. Walters arrives and battles the assailant, who she discovers to be Murdock as his superhero persona Daredevil. Murdock reveals to Walters that Patilio kidnapped Jacobson, and the two work together to rescue the latter before sleeping together. The next day, Walters attends the Southern California Law Awards gala, where she accepts a Female Lawyer of the Year award, but the gala is interrupted by an Intelligencia broadcast which smears Walters' reputation by displaying footage of her in bed with Miller. Briefly losing control, Walters goes on a rampage, destroying the gala stage and attempting to capture a nearby Intelligencia member, only to be apprehended by the Department of Damage Control (DODC).
9	"Whose Show Is This?"	Kat Coiro	Jessica Gao	October 13, 2022
Walters is released from DODC custody, but is forced to wear an inhibitor to prevent her from transforming and loses her job at GLK&H. Nikki and Pug infiltrate an Intelligencia event where they learn that Phelps created Intelligencia and reveals he is HulkKing and Blonsky as the Abomination is serving as a motivational speaker. Walters arrives at the event and confronts Phelps, who injects himself with her blood and transforms into a Hulk. After Titania and Banner unexpectedly appear in the ensuing fight, a confused Walters destroys her inhibitor and breaks the fourth wall to confront the show's writers in Marvel Studios: Assembled. She meets with K.E.V.I.N., an artificial intelligence that claims to be in charge of the Marvel Cinematic Universe's storyline decisions, and persuades it to rewrite the finale, to which it reluctantly agrees. Returning to her show, she finds Phelps and Blonsky being arrested. While celebrating with her family and Murdock, Banner returns from Sakaar with his son Skaar. After regaining her job and being cleared of all charges, Walters vows to continue her work as a lawyer and a superhero. In a mid-credits scene, Wong breaks Blonsky out of prison and takes him to Kamar-Taj.

== Production ==
=== Development ===
By July 1989, the character Jennifer Walters / She-Hulk was expected to appear in the television film The Death of the Incredible Hulk (1990). The character ultimately did not appear, and a proposed television series featuring She-Hulk at ABC was canceled a year later. In 1991, a film based on the character entered development at New World Pictures with Larry Cohen serving as director, and Brigitte Nielsen set to play She-Hulk. Nielsen participated in a promotional photoshoot, but the film ultimately did not materialize.

In August 2019, Marvel Studios announced at the D23 conference that a She-Hulk television series was being developed for the streaming service Disney+, to be set in their shared universe the Marvel Cinematic Universe (MCU). Shortly after, Jessica Gao was approached to pitch for the series. Gao had previously met with Marvel Studios to pitch for the films Captain Marvel (2019), Black Widow (2021), and Shang-Chi and the Legend of the Ten Rings (2021), and had expressed her desire to be approached about a potential She-Hulk project each time. She was one of the first creatives to include the character in her pitches to the studio, doing so in her Black Widow one, which Marvel Studios executive Brad Winderbaum felt was more of a She-Hulk film featuring Black Widow than a pitch for a Black Widow film. Gao said her past pitches had allowed her to build a relationship with Marvel Studios, so by the time she pitched for She-Hulk Feige and the other executives knew the type of writer she was, her humor, and "the quirks and nuances" she put into her scripts. Her pitch for She-Hulk included the characters Bruce Banner and Emil Blonsky / Abomination, though she was unsure if they would be able to appear, including an extended trial plot for Blonsky. Gao also included the Leader in her pitch and suggested that they either bring back the Samuel Sterns version of the character, who was portrayed by Tim Blake Nelson in The Incredible Hulk (2008), or create a new version that could have been related to Sterns; the Leader ultimately did not appear, and Gao could not remember whether this was a writing choice or if Marvel Studios did not allow the series to use the character. Gao was hired to serve as the head writer for She-Hulk in November 2019.

In September 2020, Kat Coiro was hired to direct the first and final episodes plus four others, and to executive produce the series, while Anu Valia had also joined as a director by December 2020. Valia said she was directing a few episodes of the series and described Coiro as the series' "visionary leader". She hoped by joining the series that she would be able to add to what Gao and Coiro had created and find her "own personal connection to the story". Coiro ultimately directed six episodes and Valia directed three. In May 2022, Marvel Studios announced that the series would be titled She-Hulk: Attorney at Law. Marvel Studios president Kevin Feige decided to change the name after hearing Banner's line "She-Hulk attorney at law, it's got a nice ring to it" while editing the series and feeling that it would be a "great title for a show". Alternate titles for some episodes are displayed during the opening credits: She-Hulk: Attorney for Hire in the second episode, She-Hulk by Titania in the fifth, Just Jen: Attorney at Law in the sixth, and The Savage She-Hulk in the ninth.

The series was originally announced as consisting of ten episodes, and Feige said these would equal approximately six hours of content. This was changed to nine episodes during development due to the natural progression of the story, and Coiro praised Marvel for having the flexibility to change the episode count as needed. Marvel Studios' Feige, Louis D'Esposito, Victoria Alonso, and Winderbaum served as executive producers on the series along with Coiro and Gao. She-Hulk: Attorney at Law reportedly had a budget of $225 million, giving each episode a $25 million budget.

=== Writing ===
Francesca Gailes, Jacqueline J. Gailes, Melissa Hunter, Dana Schwartz, Kara Brown, Zeb Wells, and Cody Ziglar serve as writers on the series, many of whom come from a sitcom background. Francesca Gailes also serves as story editor. Wells and Ziglar contributed their knowledge of comics to the series, such as Wells suggesting the lesser-known villains who appear in his episode, "The Retreat". Writing began in 2019, and by early May 2020, work on the series' scripts had ended. Feige described the series as a "half-hour legal comedy" that would be faithful to John Byrne's take on She-Hulk in Marvel Comics, with star Tatiana Maslany calling it "this really absurd take on a legal show". Gao added that She-Hulk: Attorney at Law was "threading a fine line" of being a sitcom while still existing within the MCU, likening it to the series Ally McBeal, though that series was not a major influence for the writers given many were not in the right age demographic to have experienced that series when it was originally airing. Gao said it was "tricky" balancing tone of the series between the comedic and meta elements with the expected action and drama being within the MCU. Other influences were Legally Blonde (2001) and the series Seinfeld (1989–1998) and The People v. O. J. Simpson: American Crime Story (2016). The series adapts a "case of the week" procedural format while still featuring some serialized elements that contribute to the season arc; Gao implemented this format due to her wanting the audience to enjoy each episode as a complete story.

The various comic series featuring the character from Stan Lee, Byrne, Dan Slott, and Charles Soule are referenced in Attorney at Law, with Gao "cherry-pick[ing]" various elements from each and "fus[ing] it all together so that it really felt simultaneously like a culmination, but also completely its own thing"; most of the series draws from the storyline of Slott's run with elements from Byrne's. Soule, who has a legal background and is also an attorney, served as the series' legal consultant, provide advice on aspects such has how lawyers and judges would behave in a courtroom.

The series incorporates Jennifer Walters' self-awareness and meta nature from the comics, with Walters gaining the awareness and ability to break the fourth wall in the series following her becoming a Hulk. Coiro said there were "some big surprises" regarding the fourth-wall breaking, with Valia adding it was "very fun, very cool", and Maslany saying it was a good mechanism to "bring the audience in" to the story. Gao, Coiro, and the writers discussed how much of the meta nature should be featured, discussing options such as would she talk to the camera, directly to the audience, or another person "more behind the scenes", and if there was another meta element. Initially Walters was constantly breaking the fourth wall, which Marvel Studios felt was too much, resulting in the writers being asked to do a version with editors' notes, a tool used in the comics to clarify story elements, appearing for Walters to interact with. The editor's notes were ultimately scrapped for her just breaking the fourth wall, but not to the extent that was originally conceived. Gao's initial pitch for the series had included Fleabag (2016–2019) and Better Call Saul (2015–2022) as references for how to portray Walters breaking the fourth wall, with Maslany believing the Attorney at Law scripts drew from Fleabag's "irreverence and sense of humor". The fourth-wall breaks culminated in the final episode of the season, with Walters entering the real world and confronting K.E.V.I.N. (Knowledge Enhanced Visual Interconnectivity Nexus) at Marvel Studios; this was heavily inspired by what Byrne did in his comics run.

The series takes a "high-concept, extraordinary idea" that becomes grounded in Walters' life, with Gao interested in exploring "that little slice of life" outside the normal huge scale and action of the MCU. Including Walters' family helped keep the series "intimate and centered on" her life, with Gao interested in exploring the family dynamic when a Hulk exists in that family and then a second one gets added to it. With the series also exploring dating for a modern woman, Maslany enjoyed how Walters' dating life "was just as much of a stress as potentially becoming one of the Avengers". Having a majority of women on the writing staff allowed them to take their different points of view to create a "well-rounded female perspective" in the series and discuss what it was like to be a woman, and what that meant if they became a public superhero. Gao explained that "a lot of commonalities and a lot of themes emerge[d]" that the writers were able to put into the series. Gao crafted a season arc for Walters' about accepting her new life as She-Hulk, describing the season as the character's "origin story", which allowed her in future appearances to be "so much more confident". The series addresses and incorporates many real-life misogynistic and Internet troll comments made about Marvel and female superheroes. Gao called these comments "very tired and unoriginal" given the writers were able to "predict" what the reaction to the series would be when they started writing in 2019.

Attorney at Law is set "a relatively short amount of time" after Shang-Chi and the Legend of the Ten Rings in the MCU. Gao avoided discussing the Blip given other films and series have "already covered that territory" and the events have been accepted and people of the MCU are moving on. The first four episodes and the final episode feature mid-credits scenes. They were derived from Gao's love of end credit scenes, not just within the MCU, since they reward audience's patience and are "like an extra special little treat". Additionally, it allowed the writers to include more jokes into the episodes. An original pitch for these scenes was to have them be a "running plot with bad guys".

=== Casting ===
Mark Ruffalo, who portrayed Bruce Banner / Hulk in the MCU films, said in November 2019 that he planned to meet with Feige about making an appearance in the series. In March 2020, Ruffalo confirmed that he was in talks to reprise his role in the series. That September, Deadline Hollywood reported that Tatiana Maslany had been cast in the lead role of Walters, but Maslany denied being cast and said the report was "a press release that's gotten out of hand" and "not actually a thing". The Hollywood Reporter reaffirmed Maslany's casting in November 2020, and Feige officially confirmed it the next month. Maslany was initially hesitant to join large-scale or franchise projects given her desire to perform in ones "focused on character" and tended to "guarantee" collaboration. Deciding to audition to the role, Maslany enjoyed Gao's script and was excited by the challenge the role could bring to her and believed it would bring "a little bit of a shift" in her life. She later stated she "flat-out lied" about denying her casting as she was unsure what she was allowed to say. Feige also confirmed in December 2020 Ruffalo's involvement and the casting of Tim Roth in the series. Ruffalo was reported to have a "small role" in the series. Roth reprises his role as Emil Blonsky / Abomination from The Incredible Hulk. Marvel Studios approached Roth to appear in the series after he returned to provide vocal work for the Abomination in Shang-Chi and the Legend of the Ten Rings, and the role in the series appealed to Roth's "anarchy" within himself and having his career "being chaos".

In January 2021, Ginger Gonzaga was cast as Nikki Ramos, Walters' best friend, and Renée Elise Goldsberry was cast that April as Mallory Book. Jameela Jamil was cast in June 2021 as Titania, with Josh Segarra joining the following month as Augustus "Pug" Pugliese. In May 2022, Benedict Wong was revealed to be reprising his MCU role as Wong, while Jon Bass was revealed to be part of the cast as Todd Phelps. Nicholas Cirillo, David Otunga, and Griffin Matthews were revealed to be part of the cast in May 2022. That July, Drew Matthews was revealed to be playing Dennis Bukowski. The following month, Mark Linn-Baker was revealed to be playing Morris Walters, Patty Guggenheim was revealed as Madisynn King, and Rhys Coiro, Kat's husband, was revealed as Donny Blaze. In August, Megan Thee Stallion was revealed to have a cameo appearance in the series as herself. Her inclusion in the series was suggested by Jamil, after the two had worked together on the television series Legendary.

Feige also teased appearances from other MCU characters given Walters' work as a lawyer for superheroes, with Maslany confirming there would be "some really fun characters" in the series that Walters was defending or going up against in court. The majority of the cameos in the series are characters from the comics that have yet to appear in the MCU. Charlie Cox was revealed to be appearing in the series in his MCU role of Matt Murdock / Daredevil in July 2022, which Coiro called the series' "biggest surprise". He had been approached by Feige in June 2020 to reprise his role from Marvel's Netflix television series for this and the film Spider-Man: No Way Home (2021). In August 2022, Brandon Stanley was revealed as Eugene Patilio / Leap-Frog. Nick Gomez, Justin Eaton, Tennison Barry III, and Kyle Murillo respectively appear as Wrecker, Thunderball, Bulldozer, and Piledriver, members of the Wrecking Crew, while David Pasquesi appears as Craig Hollis / Mister Immortal. Additional characters include Nathan Hurd as Man-Bull, Joseph Castillo-Midyett as El Águila, Terrence Clowe as Saracen, and Jordan Aaron Ford as Porcupine. The villain Bushwacker was also considered to appear, but was cut from one of the series' early episodes. Wil Deusner provides motion-capture for Skaar, Hulk's son. Gao was unaware if Marvel Studios planned to have Deusner remain in the role for Skaar's future appearances.

=== Design ===
Ann Foley served as the costume designer, after previously working on the Marvel Television series Agents of S.H.I.E.L.D. (2013–2020). Gonzaga provided input into Nikki's wardrobe since she enjoys and knows fashion. She said that Nikki's wardrobe "can't be too crazy" given she works in an office, but was able to make it "cool and edgy". Gonzaga felt most comfortable portraying Nikki when she was wearing "something a little defiant or something that she shouldn't be wearing at work or something that's a little too high fashion". Additionally, Gonzaga sold some of her own personal clothing to the series to wear as Nikki. Speaking to Titania's look in the series, Jamil said the creatives wanted "to go for eleven [with] her style and everything about her", noting her "hair is so big and her outfits are so extra". It was important to Jamil that Titania looked "very fake in every way", so she wore a padded butt to replicate buttock augmentation and did her own make up to make it seem like Titania had plastic surgery by "overlining my lips and chiseling down my nose and overdoing my cheekbones". Daredevil's costume is similar to the red one he wore in Marvel's Netflix series, but with an updated color scheme to include the yellow helmet and accents from the character's debut comics design in Daredevil vol. #1 (1964). Cox's original suit was used as a reference and for his costume fitting for the one featured in She-Hulk. Marvel Studios had clear intentions as to what his costume would look like for the series. Cox was excited that She-Hulk was using this suit, also understanding the fans and viewers would equally be excited that the character was able to wear that suit. Elena Albanese served as production designer.

An example of Kagan McLeod's courtroom sketch drawings featured in the series' end credits. McLeod was chosen given his history as a courtroom artist and a comics artist, and his style was one Aspect called "visually entertaining" that they easily envisioned being able to animate.

The series' end credits are in the style of courtroom sketches and are drawn by Kagan McLeod, who worked with Aspect on them. Jon Berkowitz, creative director at Aspect, stated they had been approached around November 2021 to pitch ideas for the end credits, explaining that the team at Aspect and Marvel Studios were both drawn to exploring the theme of struggling with one's identity. Before settling on the courtroom sketch concept, Aspect envisioned credits that were inside Walters' mind, "a hallucinatory expression of identity and duality"; one they called "Roommates" that "got wacky" and would have used "vector-y" 2D animation; and one called "The Masks We Wear" that was "really out-there" focusing on how Walters' public "mask" is her She-Hulk identity. Moving forward with the courtroom sketches, Aspect hoped to show "the story outside the story" rather than serving as a recap for the preceding episode. McLeod created 72 individual ink drawings for the credits, sending them to Aspect after doing the ink pass, then a thicker brush pass, and finally with full watercolor and paint. Aspect took the drawings and created 3D animations from them in order to better manipulate the scope and depth of the drawings; a digital paper texture was also added to the sequences. Each episode featured the same 32 drawings at the beginning and end of the credits, with three unique drawings in the middle for each episode. Marvel Studios had originally planned to use the series' marketing logo at the end of the credits sequence that had been created by the agency Buddha Jones which Berkowitz felt would have been a stark change from seeing McLeod's art before. McLeod created a version of the logo in his style that impressed Marvel Studios to feature in the sequence.

=== Filming ===
Filming began on April 12, 2021, at Trilith Studios in Atlanta, Georgia, with Coiro and Valia directing episodes of the series, and Florian Ballhaus and Doug Chamberlain serving as cinematographers for Coiro and Valia, respectively. The series was filmed under the working titles Libra, Clover, and Big Lady. Filming was previously expected to begin on July 6, 2020, but was postponed to March 2021, due to the COVID-19 pandemic.

Coiro worked to visually keep the comedy of the series balanced with the expected cinematic scope of the MCU, stating, "We obviously are exploring themes and we're exploring tone and we're exploring very everyday comedic moments, but we still need it to feel like it's part of the MCU". Roth initially found it difficult to return to the character but was able to approach the role with more humor after watching and beginning to work alongside Ruffalo. Coiro worked to find a balance when portraying sex in the series, without it going "too far" or being "taboo", while still making it accessible and enjoyable for general audiences. She noted that Maslany felt the sex positivity of the character was "very important to her" and was a main contributor to the conversations about the sexualization in the series.

Jamil said she would be filming her scenes until the week of August 15, and filming for the series wrapped by that date. During filming, Coiro partnered with the environmental nonprofit Habits of Waste and their "Lights, Camera, Plastic" campaign, to avoid featuring single-use plastics on screen when possible and replacing them with reusable and eco-friendly items.

=== Post-production ===
Visual effects for the series were created by Digital Domain, FuseFX, Soho VFX, Trixter, Wētā FX, and Wylie Co. Coiro discussed the digital character of She-Hulk, believing some of the initial negative reactions to it in the marketing was because "she is so different" than other digital characters, as she does not have the same "grisliness, harshness, [or] bulkiness" as characters like Thanos or Hulk do. She added that the creatives were focused on achieving detail in She-Hulk's facial expressions and her "nuances of reaction", and credited Alonso for her "incredible eye" in helping to design the character. As well, the creative team focused on strength over aesthetics, studying musculature and woman athletes rather than bodybuilders. Coiro explained, "So she doesn't have a bodybuilder's physique, but she absolutely has a very strong physique that can justify the actions that she does in the show. I think people expected a bodybuilder and for her to have these big, massive muscles but she looks more like Olympians".

Gao noted that, despite Feige encouraging her and the writers to feature She-Hulk as much as possible in the series, when it came time to start filming, it was requested that some of the scenes with She-Hulk be changed to ones with Walters. She added that "a lot of things... had to be changed at the last minute" because of this shift, and even while editing the episodes, a number of shots were cut that featured She-Hulk due to budget constraints. Digital Domain drew inspiration from the ripening of a strawberry when designing Walters' transformation into She-Hulk. A number of final visual effects shots were reportedly added to the series after it had premiered; this was in part because of the rearranging of the character's backstory that originally was scripted to occur at the end of series before being moved up to the first episode in post-production. Jamie Gross, Stacey Schroeder, Zene Baker, and Tim Roche served as editors on the series.

=== Music ===
Amie Doherty was revealed to be composing the score for the series in July 2022. Doherty wanted her main theme to work for both Walters in the courtroom, and then be able to transition into "this big superhero world" for She-Hulk. The She-Hulk part of the theme Doherty described as "big and bombastic" and one that would fit in the "well-established sound" of the MCU and found Walters' portion more challenging to fit alongside the MCU sound while still being unique. She watched legal dramas like Ally McBeal, The Good Wife (2009–2016), and The Good Fight (2017–2022) for inspiration. Doherty wanted to bring a "modern" sound to her score alongside the orchestra, looking at songs from Megan Thee Stallion, Billie Eilish, and other artists in the top 40. Woodwind instruments were intentionally left out of the score, with Doherty using synths to fill the frequencies they would have provided; brass and strings were also recorded for the score. The score was recorded at Synchron Stage Vienna.

The score for the series was released digitally by Marvel Music and Hollywood Records in two volumes: music from the first four episodes was released on September 16, and music from the last five episodes was released on October 19. The series' main theme was released as an eponymous single on August 18.

She-Hulk: Attorney at Law – Vol. 1 (Episodes 1–4) [Original Soundtrack]
No.	Title	Length
1.	"She-Hulk: Attorney at Law"	2:27
2.	"Practicing for Court"	1:05
3.	"First Transformation"	1:49
4.	"Weird Stuff Just Kind of Finds You"	1:06
5.	"What Happened to Me?"	4:04
6.	"A Normal Amount of Rage"	2:19
7.	"Under Control"	1:51
8.	"Ladies and Gentleman of the Jury"	1:30
9.	"Family Dinner"	2:18
10.	"New Job, Who Dis?"	1:17
11.	"Prison Visit"	2:32
12.	"Think About It"	1:45
13.	"Winning Strategy"	1:06
14.	"Thirst Trap"	1:26
15.	"News Cycle"	1:10
16.	"Impersonating a Judge"	1:45
17.	"Parole Board Hearing"	2:14
18.	"Good Deeds"	2:16
19.	"Chose to Remain"	1:40
20.	"Waiting for the Verdict"	1:10
21.	"Alleyway Attack"	1:33
22.	"Sleight of Hand"	1:58
23.	"Spoilers"	1:28
24.	"Cease and Desist"	1:42
25.	"Drunk Witness"	2:45
26.	"Case Closed"	1:43
27.	"The Show Must Go Wrong"	2:04
28.	"Covered in Goo"	2:14
Total length:		52:17

She-Hulk: Attorney at Law – Vol. 2 (Episodes 5–9) [Original Soundtrack]
No.	Title	Length
1.	"She Hulk by Titania"	1:25
2.	"Sneaker Drop"	1:20
3.	"Bootleg Merch"	0:23
4.	"Top Tier"	1:07
5.	"Legally Outmaneuvered"	1:38
6.	"All Rise"	1:06
7.	"Extra Stretch Wool"	1:18
8.	"Parade of Questionable Men"	1:34
9.	"Something Extra"	1:02
10.	"Bridesmaid Box"	1:32
11.	"The Ultimate Escape Artist"	1:49
12.	"Plus One"	2:15
13.	"Forced to Prove It"	1:37
14.	"Trolling the Trolls"	1:00
15.	"Ulterior Motive"	1:20
16.	"Dater's Gon' Date"	2:25
17.	"No New Messages"	1:49
18.	"Identity Issues"	1:25
19.	"Searching for Service"	4:23
20.	"Third-Degree Burns"	1:17
21.	"Blacklisted"	3:56
22.	"Ketchup & Mustard Color Scheme" (references Main Title from Daredevil by John Paesano & Braden Kimball)	2:58
23.	"Do My Thing"	2:54
24.	"Invasion of Privacy"	1:48
25.	"Plea Deal"	2:34
26.	"Defamation Investigation"	2:13
27.	"Genius Plan"	1:37
28.	"Females, Amirite?"	2:11
29.	"Do Not Ask Permission"	3:24
30.	"A Lot of Original Thinkers"	2:27
31.	"We Smash Things"	1:58
32.	"The Difficult Diva of Law, Herself"	2:36
Total length:		62:35

== Marketing ==
The first footage of the series debuted on Disney+ Day on November 12, 2021. The teaser ends with Walters saying to the audience, "Don't make me angry; you wouldn't like me when I'm angry" alongside Ruffalo as Banner, which is a homage to an episode of the 1970s live-action television series The Incredible Hulk in which Bill Bixby, who portrayed David Banner, says the line; Ruffalo was in a similar pose and costume as Bixby. Feige and Maslany debuted the trailer for the series on May 17, 2022, at Disney's upfront presentation. The trailer was criticized for its visual effects, with many fans online expressing their disappointment. Despite this, Charles Pulliam-Moore of The Verge called it "simply smashing" and highlighted the trailer's visual effects, adding that "the show's clearly going to be Jennifer's to own as she embarks on her own path to heroism". Zachariah Kelly of Gizmodo Australia felt the trailer "does not disappoint at all", calling the scene where She-Hulk cradles "her Tinder date like a baby... absolutely hilarious", and enjoyed having more context to the clips first seen in the Disney+ Day footage. Meanwhile, Richard Trenholm and Joan E. Solsman from CNET described the trailer as "hilarious" and wrote that it "sells the playful tone of the upcoming show". TechRadar's Stephen Lambrechts meanwhile opined that the trailer was faithful to comic book runs of the character, though he acknowledged criticism surrounding the use of visual effects. The trailer was viewed 78 million times in the 24 hours after it was released, which was the second most views for an MCU Disney+ trailer in a 24-hour time-frame, only behind The Falcon and the Winter Soldier's Super Bowl LV trailer.

The series was promoted at the 2022 San Diego Comic-Con with Coiro, Valia, Gao, Maslany, Gonzaga, and Jamil alongside the release of the second trailer. Andrew Webster of The Verge felt the trailer had "more lighthearted tone than the first [one],... [with] some legal drama". Edidiong Mboho of Collider stated that the trailer set the "comedic tone mixed with the epic" of the series. Jacob Sarkisian of Digital Spy found She-Hulk's fourth-wall breaking the "eye-catching feature of the trailer". Similarly, Daniel Chin of The Ringer highlighted the "comedic tone that's true to the fourth-wall-breaking nature of its source material" of the trailer and felt it revealed more about the plot. A poster also released at Comic-Con featured a hotline number that had a pre-recorded message from Walters describing the services her law firm provided superpowered individuals. An episode of the series Marvel Studios: Legends was released on August 10, 2022, exploring Banner using footage of his MCU film appearances. Disney created an ad on Tinder meant to represent a dating profile for Walters, while a faux commercial for Walters' law firm Goodman, Lieber, Kurtzberg & Holliway was released ahead of the series' premiere, which Cameron Bonomolo from ComicBook.com described as a "Better Call Saul-style advertisement".

Ahead of the release of the second episode, a Twitter account for Titania was created, while a video was released of Jamil in character covering real-world posters for the series on Sunset Boulevard with her own and spray-painting her name on them. This was after Titania's brief appearance at the end of the first episode, with Jamil believing there was "something so iconic" and "very desperate" about someone promoting themselves after such a brief appearance. Jamil also appeared in character in New York City in September 2022 for a L'Officiel party and Kourtney Kardashian's Boohoo fashion show. Jamil chose to make these appearances in character as a way to pay homage to how the series breaks the fourth wall. At that time, a message from Titania appeared on the hotline number replacing the previous one. Following the season finale, the hotline number featured a new message from Mallory Book and Pug, advertising the superhuman law services from GLK&H and touting the various famous clients they worked with, such as Megan Thee Stallion, Blonsky, and Wong.

A QR code was included in each episode linking viewers to a website to access free digital comics featuring She-Hulk that updated weekly, a program which was first introduced in Moon Knight. The comics released for the episodes, in order, were Savage She-Hulk #1, She-Hulk (2004) #1, Savage She-Hulk #2, West Coast Avengers Annual #4, She-Hulk (2004) #10, West Coast Avengers #46, Tales to Astonish #48, She-Hulk (2014) #9, and Sensational She-Hulk #50. The "Marvel Must Haves" merchandise program, which reveals new toys, games, books, apparel, home decor, and other merchandise related to each episode of She-Hulk following an episode's release, started for the episodes on August 19 and concluded on October 15, 2022.

== Release ==
She-Hulk: Attorney at Law held its world premiere at El Capitan Theatre in Los Angeles on August 15, 2022. The series debuted on Disney+ on August 18, 2022, and consisted of nine episodes, concluding on October 13. It was originally scheduled to debut on Wednesday, August 17 with releases weekly on Wednesdays, before moving to weekly releases on Thursdays. It is the final series in Phase Four of the MCU.

== Reception ==
=== Viewership ===
Whip Media, which tracks viewership data for the more than 21 million worldwide users of its TV Time app, calculated that She-Hulk: Attorney at Law was the second most-anticipated new series for August 2022. Variety's Trending TV chart, which tracks social media engagement across trending television content, reported that She-Hulk: Attorney at Law generated 634,000 engagements on Twitter from May 16–22, 2022. The series debuted in second place on the chart following the release of its first official trailer at the Disney Upfront presentation in New York on May 17. Market research company Parrot Analytics, which looks at consumer engagement in consumer research, streaming, downloads, and on social media, announced that She-Hulk emerged as one of the most in-demand new series in the third quarter of 2022, ranking as the third most in-demand premiere with 30.5 times the average series demand in its first 30 days.

Market research company YouGov estimated that She-Hulk was the thirteenth most popular new series of 2022, based on its analysis of search volume, streaming behavior, and engagement metrics like Wikipedia views. Streaming analytics firm FlixPatrol, which monitors daily updated VOD charts and streaming ratings across the globe, reported that it was the seventh most-streamed series on Disney+ in 2022. According to the file-sharing news website TorrentFreak, She-Hulk was the ninth most-watched pirated television series of 2022. Luminate, which measures streaming performance in the U.S. by analyzing viewership data, audience engagement metrics, and content reach across various platforms, reported that it accounted for 8.9% of total original series viewership on Disney+ between December 31, 2021, and December 29, 2022. It was the platform's fourth most-streamed show in 2022, with 2.9 billion minutes viewed in the United States.

Despite the online response to the series creating the impression that it was not well liked, Winderbaum said in April 2026 it did well with general audiences and was actually one of Marvel Studios' best performing series in terms of viewership.

=== Critical response ===
She-Hulk: Attorney at Law: Critical reception by episode
Percentage of positive critics' reviews tracked by the website Rotten Tomatoes

The review aggregator website Rotten Tomatoes reported an approval rating of 79%, with an average score of 6.65/10, based on 614 reviews. The site's critic's consensus states: "Whether she's fighting bad guys, defending a client, or managing her messy social life, She-Hulk: Attorney at Law passes the bar for bingeworthy viewing". Metacritic, which uses a weighted average, assigned the series a score of 67 out of 100 based on 26 critics, indicating "generally favorable reviews".

The series' first four episodes were reviewed by critics before they debuted. Daniel Fienberg at The Hollywood Reporter called these episodes "broad, bright and eager to serve the audience with a wink and a nudge" though lacking "stakes or a distinctive style". He felt the series' writing for characters previously seen in more dramatic situations, and the Easter eggs and cameos would be divisive with viewers. Writing for Rolling Stone, Alan Sepinwall said attempting to be a half-hour comedy series produced "mixed but mostly positive" results, but believed the series had a harder time distinguishing itself within the MCU than the character's comic series because the MCU had a lighter tone already compared to the other comics being published around She-Hulk's runs, which made the contrast of her comics more apparent. He also noted the MCU was "drastically less populated" in regards to characters that could be featured, with Slott having an "enormous toy box" in the comics to feature a wide array of characters. Sepinwall said the humor of Attorney at Law was "softer than what you find in the more overtly ridiculous MCU films like Thor: Ragnarok or Guardians of the Galaxy" and did not become consistently funny until the fourth episode.

Joelle Monique at TheWrap called the series "a delightful break from the cutesy family fun and intense heroic introspection" of the previous Marvel Studios Disney+ series, praising Maslany's performance and noting it was "incredibly rewarding as a long-time fan of the franchise" as well as those who enjoy legal television series. Richard Roeper from the Chicago Sun-Times gave the episodes 3 out of 4 stars, praising Maslany and believing She-Hulk: Attorney at Law "plays like a 21st century take on a 1980s TV show" and felt like "one of those 'cameo every week' kind of shows, with gratuitous but entertaining fight sequences sprinkled in between the courtroom antics and the comedic byplay". The Verge's Charles Pulliam-Moore said the series a "surprisingly refreshing spin" on the Marvel Studios Disney+ series, one that felt "like the precursor to something new yet very familiar". Arezou Amin of Collider gave the first four episodes an "A", saying they were a "delightful ride" and was hopeful the final five episodes would be equally charming.

Caroline Framke of Variety said in her review that the series was "charming enough as it bounces from one hijink to the next, especially in Maslany's capable hands. But between its obligations to the larger Marvel Cinematic Universe, a far more limited budget than its film peers, and attempts to infuse Jen's story with dated #girlboss energy, She-Hulk also represents an unsteady balancing act that needs more time than it likely has to settle into its own groove". She also noted having Walters be able to have more control over She-Hulk than Banner with Hulk because of her daily experiences as a woman keeping her emotions in check was "an undeniably effective way to make the She-Hulk experience markedly, urgently different from that of" Hulk's. Framke also called the story's approach to Walters' job and dating life, and the series' costumes, "several steps out of date", and wished for a more innovative approach to the fourth-wall breaking, that has become more commonplace in media since Byrne introduced it to the character in the comics back in the 1980s. Giving the series 2.5 stars out of 4, USA Today's Kelly Lawler said She-Hulk: Attorney at Law "oh-so-close to being a great show, but doesn't fully commit to any of the three or four different shows it's attempting", wishing it committed better to the legal comedy, with more fourth-wall breaking and the examinations of regular humans in the MCU. Despite this, Lawler felt Walters was "a very appealing protagonist", with praise also going to Maslany, and that the series had "some well-placed humor", believing if Attorney at Law "leans into its strengths, it could be a really unique, fun take" on the MCU. Kirsten Howard from Den of Geek enjoyed that the woman characters were portrayed as "smart, strong, and girlbossing it", but, like Framke, added it was "a rather rote narrative" that felt "dated as all hell, [and] speaks to how far behind the MCU is with female superhero representation that it feels the need to catch up in such a lazy and clichéd way". They also felt the second, third, and fourth episodes were "too fluffy [and] too hackneyed", criticizing the comedy, procedural elements, and infrequent fourth-wall breaking that ended up being "jarring".

The response to the series' visual effects were mixed, with some reviewers feeling it was an improvement over what was featured in the trailers, while others called it distracting and entering the uncanny valley. Some were critical of it, but believed it did not detract from the series, with Howard stating some visual effects in the later episodes leaned towards "Polar Express territory". Howard also felt it would have been "a pretty powerful statement on its own" to have a fully realized She-Hulk character model against the Hulk model.

In a review of the entire series, Amelia Emberwing from IGN gave She-Hulk: Attorney at Law an 8 out of 10, praising the approach from Gao, Coiro, and Maslany. She enjoyed the humor Gao and the writers were able to find in moments that highlight "some of the most ridiculous parts of everyday life as a woman" against the struggle of suddenly gaining superpowers along with the sitcom format and the fourth-wall breaks. However, both the sitcom format and fourth-wall breaks "fall apart" in the finale, which was "unable to reconcile with its tone" and did not adequately resolve "the abject humiliation Jen experiences" in the penultimate episode. Despite this "little bit of a bobble" at the end of the series, Emberwing found Attorney at Law to be "completely fresh to the Marvel Cinematic Universe", particularly in bringing "female sexuality front and center" and its approach to toxic masculinity. Emberwing's colleague Alex Stedman felt Attorney at Law was a successful first sitcom in the MCU, praising Maslany's performance, though feeling the 30 minute runtimes were at times too short, and sometime wishing multiple episodes had been released each week. Polygon's Matt Patches called the series "easily one of the horniest shows currently streaming on Disney Plus, and for that, one of the most refreshing". Debiparna Chakraborty at MovieWeb said Attorney at Law was "a feminist satire, an origin story, and an overall fun show that manages to break away from many regular MCU tropes", enjoying the fact the series set a clear tone early on and Walters' ability to break the fourth wall.

=== Accolades ===
Accolades received by She-Hulk: Attorney at Law
Award	Date of ceremony	Category	Recipient(s)	Result	Ref.
People's Choice Awards	December 6, 2022	Sci-Fi/Fantasy Show of 2022	She-Hulk: Attorney at Law	Nominated	
Visual Effects Society Awards	February 15, 2023	Outstanding Animated Character in an Episode or Real-Time Project	Elizabeth Bernard, Jan Philip Cramer, Edwina Ting, and Andrew Park (for She-Hulk)	Nominated	
MPSE Golden Reel Awards	February 26, 2023	Outstanding Achievement in Sound Editing – Broadcast Short Form	Mac Smith, Steve Bissinger, Tim Farrell, Goeun Everett, Vanessa Lapato, Ryan Cota, Joel Raabe, Ian Chase, Sean England, Andrea Gard, and Kim B. Christensen (for "Ribbit and Rip It")	Nominated	
MPSE Golden Reel Awards	February 26, 2023	Outstanding Achievement in Music Editing – Broadcast Short Form	Anele Onyekwere, Mary Parker, Leah Dennis, and Zak Millman (for "Is This Not Real Magic?")	Nominated	
Cinema Audio Society Awards	March 4, 2023	Outstanding Achievement in Sound Mixing for Television Series – Half Hour	Marcus Petruska, Pete Horner, Karol Urban, Alvin Wee, Doc Kane, and Jason Butler (for "Whose Show Is This?")	Nominated	
Kids' Choice Awards	March 4, 2023	Favorite Family TV Show	She-Hulk: Attorney at Law	Nominated	
Critics' Choice Super Awards	March 16, 2023	Best Superhero Series, Limited Series or Made-For-TV Movie	She-Hulk: Attorney at Law	Nominated	
Critics' Choice Super Awards	March 16, 2023	Best Actress in a Superhero Series	Tatiana Maslany	Won	
MTV Movie & TV Awards	May 7, 2023	Best Musical Moment	"Body"	Nominated	
Dorian Awards	June 26, 2023	Campiest TV Show	She-Hulk: Attorney at Law	Nominated	
Golden Trailer Awards	June 29, 2023	Best Comedy / Drama TrailerByte for a TV / Streaming Series	Level Up AV (for digital "Split")	Nominated	
Golden Trailer Awards	June 29, 2023	Best Viral Campaign for a TV / Streaming Series	Tiny Hero (for She-Hulk: Attorney at Law Creative Content Campaign)	Nominated	
Astra TV Awards	January 8, 2024	Best Actress in a Streaming Comedy Series	Tatiana Maslany	Nominated	
Astra Creative Arts TV Awards	January 8, 2024	Best Stunts	She-Hulk: Attorney at Law	Nominated	
Saturn Awards	February 4, 2024	Best Superhero Television Series	She-Hulk: Attorney at Law	Nominated	
Saturn Awards	February 4, 2024	Best Actress in a Television Series	Tatiana Maslany	Nominated	

== Documentary special ==
In February 2021, the documentary series Marvel Studios: Assembled was announced. The specials go behind the scenes of the MCU films and television series with cast members and additional creatives. The special of this series, "The Making of She-Hulk: Attorney at Law", was released on Disney+ on November 3, 2022.

== Future ==
Feige stated in November 2019 that after She-Hulk was introduced in the series, the character would cross over to the MCU films. In February 2021, he said some of Marvel Studios' series, including She-Hulk and Moon Knight (2022), were being developed with the potential to have additional seasons made, in contrast to series like WandaVision (2021) which were developed as limited events that led into feature films. Coiro echoed this in August 2022, saying the series could get a second season or the character could appear in films. Gao had an idea for a second season but focused on telling a complete story with the first. She was hopeful that this as well as material cut from the first season would be able to be used in future projects.

In January 2024, Maslany said a second season was unlikely, stating, "I think we blew our budget, and Disney was like 'No thanks!'". io9 contextualized Maslany's comments noting how Disney CEO Bob Iger's return to the company in November 2022 brought a reevaluation to the company's content output, including Marvel Studios'. They stated: "while Marvel works everything out, it's not that a second season of She-Hulk has been completely abandoned. It just seems less likely than not at the moment", though agreed with Maslany that, because of its large budget, the series would need "major changes" with its visual effects to become more cost-effective. Winderbaum expressed interest in continuing the series in April 2026. The following month, Maslany called the character's future "open-ended" and felt Gao should be involved with any subsequent appearances because she believed Gao had a strong understanding of the tone and story of She-Hulk.
