= Man-Bull =

Fictional character

- Man-Bull as depicted in Howard the Duck (vol. 5) #3 (July 2015). Art by Jason Latour.

Publication information
- Publisher: Marvel Comics
- First appearance: Daredevil #78 (July 1971)
- Created by: Gerry Conway; Gene Colan

In-story information
- Alter ego: William "Bill" Taurens
- Species: Human mutate
- Team affiliations: Death Squad; Frightful Four; Menagerie; Vil-Anon
- Partnerships: Matador
- Notable aliases: Minotaur; Savage; Bull Taurus
- Abilities: Superhuman strength, speed and endurance Razor-sharp horns Bovine empathy

The Man-Bull (William Taurens) is a supervillain appearing in American comic books published by Marvel Comics.

Man-Bull made his live-action debut in the Marvel Cinematic Universe television series She-Hulk: Attorney at Law, portrayed by Nate Hurd.

== Publication history ==
The Man-Bull first appeared in Daredevil #78 (July 1971), and was created by writer Gerry Conway and artist Gene Colan. The character subsequently appeared in Daredevil #95-96 (January–February 1973), Claws of the Cat #4 (June 1973), Iron Man #72 (January 1975), Daredevil #129 (January 1976), and Daredevil #144 (April 1977). The character did not appear again for some time, until The Incredible Hulk #341 (March 1988), and he then appeared in Marvel Year-in-Review '92, The Amazing Spider-Man: Chaos in Calgary #4 (February 1993), Captain America #413 (March 1993), and New Warriors #36 (June 1993). He disappeared again for a time, before appearing in She-Hulk #10 (February 2005), Gravity #1 (August 2005), Wolverine (vol. 3) #30 (September 2005), Spider-Man Unlimited #12 (January 2006), Underworld #3 (June 2006), and Punisher War Journal (vol. 2) #13-15 (January–March 2008).

The Man-Bull received an entry in the original Official Handbook of the Marvel Universe #6, and in the All-New Official Handbook of the Marvel Universe A to Z: Update #1 (2007).

== Fictional character biography ==
William Taurens was born in Camden, New Jersey. He was hired by Mister Kline to round up people to test an experimental serum (taken from bulls) made out of mutated enzymes by his agent the Professor. Although assisted by Itch and Freak Face, his attempts were thwarted by Daredevil. As a result, he ended up being a guinea pig for the serum which turned him into a humanoid bull. Becoming the Man-Bull, he fought Daredevil, who defeated the Man-Bull by throwing him into a wall. Man-Bull reverted to his human form and was arrested by the police. When Itch snuck in the Man-Bull serum into Taurens' prison cell which permanently transformed him, Man-Bull attempted to take revenge on Daredevil and the two have clashed on several occasions. Man-Bull was later recruited by the Melter and Whiplash to join the Black Lama's Death Squad, where they encountered Iron Man at a comic book convention. Man-Bull eventually becomes more animalistic: he loses the ability to speak and gains fur and a tail. In this state, he is encountered by the Grey Hulk. As Man-Bull continued to deteriorate, he was recruited by Wizard to join his Frightful Four alongside Trapster and Dreadknight.

Man-Bull later regains his capability of speech and joins Armadillo, Equinox, Hypno-Hustler, Chip Martin, and Jackson Wheele at a Villains Anonymous meeting. Man-Bull joins Constrictor, Tombstone, Warhawk, and a number of S.H.I.E.L.D. agents in raiding an A.I.M. facility which was working on a Null android from technology stolen from Reed Richards.

In the "Hunted" storyline, Man-Bull is captured along with many other animal-themed superhumans and forced to participate in Kraven the Hunter's Great Hunt as a hunting target. During the hunt, Man-Bull is killed by Hunter-Bots. In Ruins of Ravencroft, Man-Bull appears alive, having been imprisoned at Ravencroft following its rebuilding.

During the King in Black storyline, Man-Bull is seen at the Bar with No Name when Mayor Wilson Fisk offers a job to everyone there. Man-Bull is later seen at Ravencroft during Knull's invasion. He, Figment, Foolkiller and Mister Hyde flee with the Thunderbolts in a van as they retrieve Sentry's corpse. Man-Bull and the Thunderbolts visit Fisk and blackmail him for money while planning to stay together as a team.

== Powers and abilities ==
Man-Bull possesses bull-like physiology that gives him superhuman physical abilities, powerful horns, and the ability to mentally control other bovines. However, he is prone to periods of feral violence caused by adrenaline and the side effects of the serum that gave him his powers.

== Other versions ==
Bull-Frog, an alternate universe funny animal version of Man-Bull from Earth-8311, appears in Peter Porker, The Spectacular Spider-Ham.

== In other media ==
Man-Bull appears in the She-Hulk: Attorney at Law episode "The Retreat", portrayed by Nathan Hurd. This version gained a cattle-like head and hair on parts of his body following an experiment gone wrong and is a member of Emil Blonsky's spiritual retreat, Summer Twilight.
