= El Águila =

Fictional mutant character appearing in Marvel Comics

Publication information
- Publisher: Marvel Comics
- First appearance: Power Man and Iron Fist #58 (August 1979)
- Created by: Mary Jo Duffy; Trevor Von Eeden; Dave Cockrum

In-story information
- Alter ego: Alejandro Montoya
- Species: Human mutant
- Team affiliations: Penance Corps
- Notable aliases: The Master; The Eagle
- Abilities: Electrostatic charge generation; Trained hand-to-hand combatant; Excellent acrobat; Skilled fencer

El Águila (Alejandro Montoya) is a character appearing in American comic books published by Marvel Comics. Created by Mary Jo Duffy, Trevor Von Eeden, and Dave Cockrum, the character first appeared in Power Man and Iron Fist #58 (August 1979). El Águila belongs to the subspecies of humans called mutants who are born with superhuman abilities. He is a swordsman vigilante with the power of bio-electricity. He was originally an adversary of the superheroes Luke Cage and Iron Fist, but became their ally over time.

The character made his live-action debut in the Marvel Cinematic Universe television series She-Hulk: Attorney at Law, portrayed by Joseph Castillo-Midyett.

== Development ==
=== Concept and creation ===
El Águila is patterned after the literary hero Zorro. His name is Spanish for "the Eagle." Writer Mary Jo Duffy recounted the creation of El Águila, "El Águila was designed by Dave Cockrum and he had this big Zorro thing, and Zorro was another one of these characters that I was just crazy about and Power Man and Iron Fist was tricky. These were not guys who could fly. Their superpowers were defensive and if they were offensive, it was going to be hands-on, and it's remarkably tricky inventing a villain for somebody like that ... It seemed to me that someone like Zorro but with one or two powers would be about the right level and since Iron Fist was a little bit easygoing and unworldly, and Power Man was just so cranky and completely grounded in the here and now, giving him somebody with this playful panache would be frustrating. Iron Fist wouldn’t even get it, Power Man would be infuriated by it, and it would give El Águila a certain amount of charm. So I wasn’t just thinking of the power problem, though it was a problem, but in terms of the characters—it had to interest me. And Power Man and Iron Fist were so well-realized as characters that if a villain wasn’t as equally well-realized, then what was the point in doing it?"

=== Publication history ===
==== 1970s ====
El Águila debuted in Power Man and Iron Fist #58 (August 1979), created by Mary Jo Duffy, Trevor Von Eeden, and Dave Cockrum. He later appeared in the 1982 Marvel Super Hero Contest of Champions series. He appeared in the 1982 Marvel Fanfare series. He appeared in the 1988 Marvel Comics Presents series.

==== 2000s ====
El Águila appeared in the 2005 G.L.A. series. He later appeared in the 2006 Marvel Westerns: Outlaw Files. He appeared in the 2006 New Avengers series and the 2011 Power Man and Iron Fist series.

== Fictional character biography ==
Alejandro Montoya was born in Madrid, Spain, and later moved to America. Upon discovering his mutant powers, Alejandro decided to use his unique abilities as a swashbuckler and costumed crime fighter, taking up the mantle of El Águila (Spanish for "The Eagle"), an identity passed down by his ancestors. As El Águila, he preys upon drug dealers and criminals that take advantage of the poor and needy. He is not a certified law authority and is wanted by authorities. Soon after launching his crime-fighting campaign against drug dealers, slumlords, brutal police, and other wrongdoers, Águila encountered Iron Fist, Power Man, and Misty Knight.

Águila aided Power Man and Iron Fist against female assassins out to kill Jeryn Hogarth. He also battled Hawkeye while investigating Cross Technological Enterprises when Hawkeye was serving as their head of security.

Águila teamed up with Power Man and Iron Fist to capture the Slasher, and fought the Constrictor. Alongside Colleen Wing and Misty Knight, he battled mercenaries working for Ward Meachum and fought Fera.

He aided Power Man, Iron Fist, Colleen Wing, Bob Diamond, and Rafael Scarfe in an attempt to rescue Misty Knight and D.W. Griffith from captivity by Ward Meachum's mercenaries.

Águila returned to Spain briefly on a request of his cousin Migdalia to save her village from the mutant Conquistador.

Águila is among the mutants who lost their powers to the Scarlet Witch during "M-Day". Despite this, he is considered for recruitment into the Initiative program because of his expertise in sword fighting and hand-to-hand combat.

== Powers and abilities ==
El Águila possesses the ability to generate electrostatic charges within his own body. He is able to discharge up to 100,000 volts of electricity. He often uses his double-edged steel sword for this purpose. Additionally, he is a skilled fencer with extraordinary swordsmanship skills, an excellent hand-to-hand combatant, and an acrobat.

== Reception ==
=== Critical response ===
Kevin Melrose of Comic Book Resources called El Águila "fun and flashy". Shawn S. Lealos of Screen Rant included El Águila in their "10 Best Cameos In She-Hulk" list.

== In other media ==
El Águila appears in the She-Hulk: Attorney at Law episode "The Retreat", portrayed by Joseph Castillo-Midyett. This version is a participant in Emil Blonsky's Summer Twilight spiritual retreat.
