= Patti Harrison =

American actress and comedian

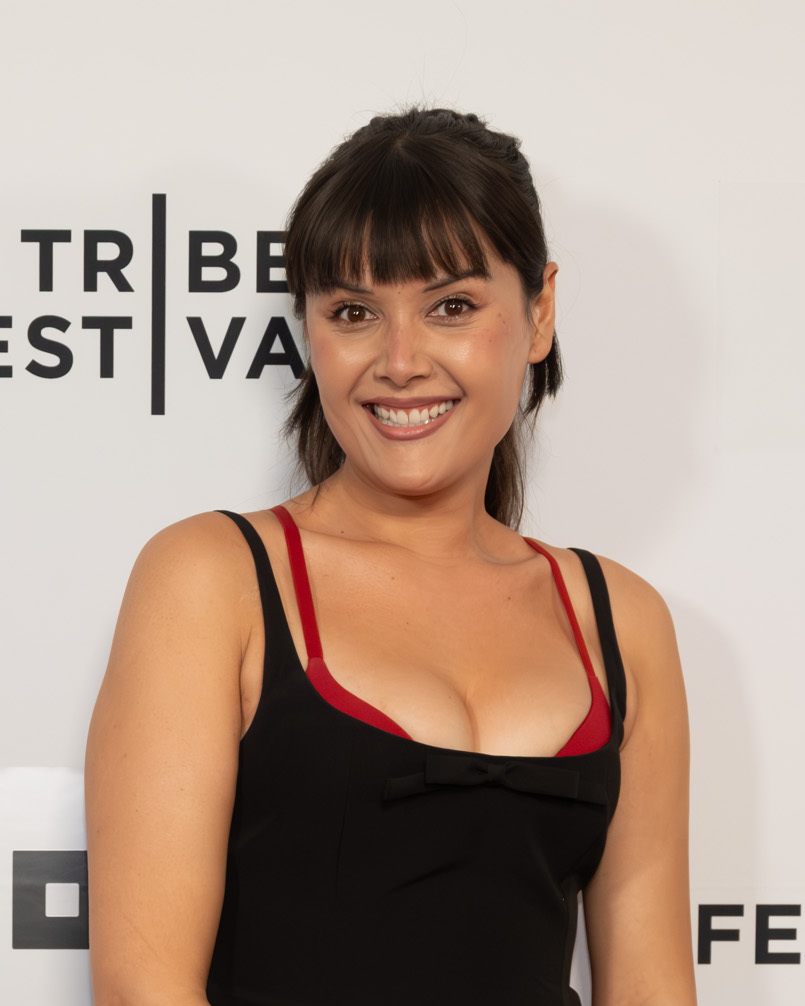
- Harrison in 2026
- Born: October 31, 1990 (age 36); Orient, Ohio, U.S.
- Occupations: Actress; comedian
- Years active: 2015–present

Patti Harrison (born October 31, 1990) is an American actress and comedian. She is best known for her roles in Shrill (2019–2021), I Think You Should Leave with Tim Robinson (2019–2023), and Together Together (2021). For her role in Together Together, she earned a nomination for the Independent Spirit Award for Best Female Lead.

== Early life ==
Patti Harrison was born in Orient, Ohio, on October 31, 1990, to a Vietnamese mother and a white American father. She has six older siblings. Her father, who was from Detroit, served in the U.S. Army during the Vietnam War and met Harrison's mother when she was a janitor in his barracks. He died of a heart attack when Harrison was six years old. Her first involvement in comedy came from her participation in an improv team during her time at Ohio University, from which she dropped out.

== Career ==
Harrison moved to New York City to pursue a comedy career in 2015, but later moved to Los Angeles. She has said that her stand-up comedy style has changed drastically since her early career, as she initially felt anxious about making sex and sexuality jokes due to internalized transphobia stemming from being a trans woman. In an interview with Vogue, she described her comedic persona: "I'm a nasty, stupid person. That's my voice. I'm an evil, shitty person on stage, in a very conscious way—the evil is punching up."

In 2017, Harrison gained wider prominence for her appearance on The Tonight Show Starring Jimmy Fallon, where she made jokes about U.S. President Donald Trump's transgender military service ban. She has appeared in comedy series such as High Maintenance, I Think You Should Leave with Tim Robinson, Broad City, and Search Party, as well as the film A Simple Favor. In 2019, she began playing Ruthie in the Hulu comedy series Shrill after the show's co-creator and star Aidy Bryant contacted her through Instagram and encouraged her to audition. She later joined the writing team of the animated comedy series Big Mouth for its fourth season.

Harrison was named one of Variety magazine's "10 Comics to Watch" in 2019. Later that year, she co-hosted Comedy Central's digital series Unsend with Joel Kim Booster. She also co-hosts the podcast A Woman's Smile with River L. Ramirez. She co-starred in Yearly Departed (2020) alongside other comedians such as Ziwe Fumudoh. That same year, she began hosting the monthly show Died & Gone to Heaven! at Largo.

In February 2021, Harrison was banned from Twitter after she impersonated the account of Nilla Wafers in a parody of corporate pinkwashing, particularly satirizing a tweet from Oreo. The controversy led to her appearing on Jimmy Kimmel Live! to discuss it. She became the first transgender actor to take part in a Disney animated film when she voiced Tail Chief in Raya and the Last Dragon (2021) and had her debut feature film leading role in Together Together (2021), for which she earned a nomination for the Independent Spirit Award for Best Female Lead. She serves as Miss Culturista at the annual Las Culturistas Culture Awards, hosted by Bowen Yang and Matt Rogers.

== Influences ==
Harrison has said one of her early comedic influences was Mad TV, which she enjoyed watching during her childhood; she admired the female comedians on the show, especially Mo Collins, Nicole Sullivan, and Debra Wilson. She has also said that Kristen Wiig and Lisa Kudrow are her idols and that the Scary Movie films were her favorites as a child.

== Personal life ==
Harrison came out as a trans woman shortly after dropping out of Ohio University, later describing her family as supportive. In 2020, she canvassed for the Democratic Socialists of America. In 2021, she was diagnosed with ADHD, telling The New Yorker that she delayed seeking a diagnosis until she had "reached a point where [she] was so frustrated with [her] inability to just stay on track". She frequently posts her artwork on Instagram.

== Filmography ==
=== Film ===
Patti Harrison film work
Year	Title	Role	Notes
2018	A Simple Favor	Kiko	
2021	Together Together	Anna Caper	
2021	Raya and the Last Dragon	Chief of Tail (voice)	
2022	The Lost City	Allison	
2022	Mack & Rita	Stephanie	
2023	Theater Camp	Caroline	
2023	Trolls Band Together	Brandy (voice)	
2023	Milennial Hunter	Claire (voice)	
2024	The Luckiest Man in America	Janie	
2026	Never Change!	Sandra	
2026	She Keeps Me Young †	TBA	Post-production
TBA	Close Personal Friends †	TBA	Post-production

=== Television ===
Patti Harrison television work
Year	Title	Role	Notes
2016–2017	The Special Without Brett Davis	Patti / Sharting Woman / Maygan Mason	6 episodes Writer (3 episodes)
2017	Broad City	Anthropologie Employee	Episode: "Bedbugs"
2017	The Chris Gethard Show	Sharon Herron	Episode: "Take a Chance"
2017	Search Party	Renee	3 episodes
2017–2018	The Tonight Show Starring Jimmy Fallon	Correspondent	3 episodes
2019	High Maintenance	Chrinty	Episode: "Breathwork"
2019	Full Frontal with Samantha Bee	Correspondent	Season 4, Episode 13
2019	BoJack Horseman	Barbara (voice)	Episode: "Feel-Good Story"
2019–2021	Shrill	Ruthie	16 episodes
2019–2023	I Think You Should Leave with Tim Robinson	Various Characters	4 episodes Writer (6 episodes)
2020	Magical Girl Friendship Squad	The Mushroominations (voice)	Episode: "Anti Fungal Spit Skanks"
2021	History of Swear Words	Herself	3 episodes
2021	Bob's Burgers	Patti / Pixie Princess Patricia (voice)	2 episodes
2021	Ziwe	Various Characters	3 episodes
2021	Tuca & Bertie	Martha (voice)	4 episodes
2021	Q-Force	Stat (voice)	10 episodes
2021	Jimmy Kimmel Live	Herself	1 episode
2021	Adventure Time: Distant Lands	Weapon Head (voice)	Episode: "Wizard City"
2021–2022	The Great North	Debbie, Momma Marita (voice)	9 episodes
2021–2022	Made for Love	Bangles de la Morga	3 episodes
2022	Three Busy Debras	London England	Episode: "Operation: Seal Team Debra"
2022	She-Hulk: Attorney at Law	Lulu	Episode: "Just Jen"
2022	American Dad!	Ali (voice)	Episode: "Smooshed: A Love Story"
2025	Poker Face	Alex	4 episodes
2025	Sausage Party: Foodtopia	Jill (voice)	Recurring role
2025	Adventure Time: Fionna and Cake	Witch Wizard (voice)	3 episodes
2026	Regular Show: The Lost Tapes	Valencia (voice)	Episode: "Coffee Shop Wars"
2026	Haunted Hotel	Rebecca (voice)	Episode: "The Witch"

=== Music videos ===
Year	Video	Artist(s)	Notes
2022	"Bicstan"	Hudson Mohawke	Starring, co-directed w/ Alan Resnick
