= The Morning After (web series) =

2010s Hulu-original web series

- Written by: Jeff Meurer; Joe Dobbyn; Patrick Kelly; Casey Gullickson; Colleen Cunha
- Directed by: Matt Vascellaro; Jeff Meurer; Casey Gullickson
- Starring: Damien Fahey; Ginger Gonzaga; Alison Haislip; Bradley Hasemeyer; Dave Holmes; Brian Kimmet; Haley Mancini; Paul Nyhart; Rachel Perry
- Country of origin: United States
- Original language: English
- No. of seasons: 3
- No. of episodes: 800

Production
- Executive producers: Jace Hall; Matt Vascellaro
- Editors: Stephanie Diane; John Holland; Chris Garcia; Jason Alexander
- Running time: around 5 minutes
- Production company: HDFilms

Original release
- Network: Hulu
- Release: January 17, 2011 – April 24, 2014

The Morning After is a Hulu original web series that premiered on January 17, 2011, and ended April 24, 2014. It was produced by Hulu and Jace Hall's HDFilms, streaming Monday through Friday. The show originally featured Brian Kimmet and Ginger Gonzaga as hosts. Later shows used a rotation of hosts including Alison Haislip, Dave Holmes, Damien Fahey, Bradley Hasemeyer, Haley Mancini, Paul Nyhart, and Rachel Perry.

The series advertises itself as "a smart, daily shot of pop culture to help Hulu users stay up to date" and typically highlights notable moments from television shows and current news in an entertaining fashion. In keeping with its focus on pop culture, The Morning After will sometimes stream an episode featuring past pop culture titled "From the Archives," such as its April Fools' Day episode.

== History ==
While not the first original series to appear exclusively on Hulu, The Morning After is the company's first self-branded production. It was preceded by If I Can Dream, a reality series co-produced with 19 Entertainment and created by Simon Fuller. Hulu originated the idea in house, based on user feedback and observations from discussion boards hosted by the website. The concept was modeled after The Big Show with Olbermann and Patrick. The company sought out a production partner and ultimately chose Jace Hall and his team at HDFilms to executive produce. Initial stream of the series was held on January 17, 2011, and featured coverage of Piers Morgan, the Golden Globes, and The Bachelor. Senior VP of Content and Distribution Andy Forssell made the announcement for the show the same day. The show aired its last episode April 24, 2014.

== Format ==
A typical episode usually begins with a cold open shared by the varying hosts listing the highlights to be covered. The topics focus on TV and Pop Culture Highlights from the previous night, with the intention of helping Hulu users digest hours of content in a matter of moments. The show has the hosts trade humorous remarks regarding the news and each other, taking turns reviewing the night's TV and injecting their own personality. The Morning After was named as an honoree by the Webbys on April 10, 2012, in the variety section of its online video category.
