= Saracen (comics) =

Saracen is the name of two fictional characters appearing in American comic books published by Marvel Comics. The first Saracen named Muzzafar Lambert is an enemy of the Punisher. The second Saracen is a member of a vampire sect called the Ancients.

The vampire version of Saracen appears in the 2022 Disney+ series She-Hulk: Attorney at Law, portrayed by Terrence Clowe.

== Publication history ==
The character made its first appearance in The Punisher #22 (August 1989), created by Mike Baron and Erik Larsen, and reappeared in The Punisher War Journal #25-27, as well as The Punisher #47-48 and The Punisher War Journal #33. The character was then killed off in the one-shot comic book The Punisher: Empty Quarter, though a version of him from an alternate universe was later featured in Exiles #99.

The vampire version of Saracen first appeared in Blade #1 (December 1999) and was created by writer-artist Bart Sears.

== Fictional character biography ==
=== Muzzafar Lambert ===
Saracen
- Saracen's Marvel Universe Card (#77 of Series II, 1991). Art by Mark Bagley.

Publication information
- Publisher: Marvel Comics
- First appearance: The Punisher #22 (August 1989)
- Created by: Mike Baron; Erik Larsen

In-story information
- Alter ego: Muzzafar Lambert
- Species: Human
- Notable aliases: Colonel Hawk

A globe-trotting mercenary and assassin whose actions, such as plundering cruise ships and blowing up airliners, have resulted in him being branded a terrorist, Saracen hails from an undisclosed Arabian country, and is said to be happily married.

Saracen first encountered the Punisher when the two infiltrated the same "ninja training camp" being run by con artists in Kansas. When the camp employees begin murdering the students, having realized that there are saboteurs among them, Saracen and the Punisher work together to survive, with Saracen explaining that he had enrolled in the camp in order to discern who among its former students was responsible for poisoning of one of the leaders of the Free Armenian Army. After the camp's instructors are killed, the Punisher saves Saracen from an explosion that immolates the establishment's owner, Chester Scully.

Saracen goes on to work for a corrupt Florida senator, who sends him to Palermo to assist the Bessucho crime family (which is led by the senator's cousin) with eliminating the Punisher. Saracen confronts the Punisher at a weapons cache owned by the Punisher's estranged relatives, Rocco and Esmerelda Castiglione. The two engage in a battle that ends with the Punisher blowing the area up, though Saracen survives, and murders Rocco and Esmerelda. Afterward, the Punisher frames Saracen for his own slaying of the corrupt senator, who was sponsoring Saracen for American citizenship.

Saracen, operating under the name Colonel Hawk, subsequently allies with a Middle Eastern country called Trafia. When the Punisher is captured by the Trafian military, Saracen orders that he be executed in a way that will send a message to Trafia's enemies, such as the nation of Zukistan. The Punisher escapes and tries to kill Saracen, but he is forced to spare him by Microchip, who reveals that Saracen is actually working for and under the protection of the governments Zukistan and Israel.

Saracen proceeds to travel to Siberia at the behest of a renegade Russian general who has taken over an oil refinery, and is seeking to secede from the Soviet Union. Hired to advise the general and supply him with wares, Saracen flees when the refinery is attacked by the Punisher.

While dismantling a narcotics ring, the Punisher finds Saracen working for drug lords in Peru, and among his possessions discovers an invitation to a "terrorist convention" being held in Rub' al Khali. With the help of the Bolivian authorities, the Punisher is able to capture Saracen, and assume his identity to infiltrate Rub' al Khali. Saracen is broken out of imprisonment by his Peruvian associates, and travels to Rub' al Khali, arriving just as the Punisher and his ally, Rose Kugel, blow up the First World International Terrorist Convention. Saracen ambushes the two, and forces the Punisher into a sword fight; the duel concludes with the Punisher dismembering and impaling Saracen.

=== Vampire ===
Saracen is a member of the Ancient, a group of vampires who are considered some of the oldest known blood suckers in existence. He hid underneath the Vatican for many years before he was awoken to summon the Reaper demon.

== Other versions ==
Saracen's counterpart on Earth-1009 is a superhero and a member of the Royal Avengers. He and his teammates, Iron Lord and American Boy, attempt to arrest Rogue, but she is saved by the Exiles member Morph.

== In other media ==
The vampiric Saracen appears in the She-Hulk: Attorney at Law episode "The Retreat", portrayed by Terrence Clowe. This version is a self-proclaimed vampire and member of Emil Blonsky's spiritual retreat, Summer Twilight.
