= Ginger Gonzaga =

American actress (born 1983)

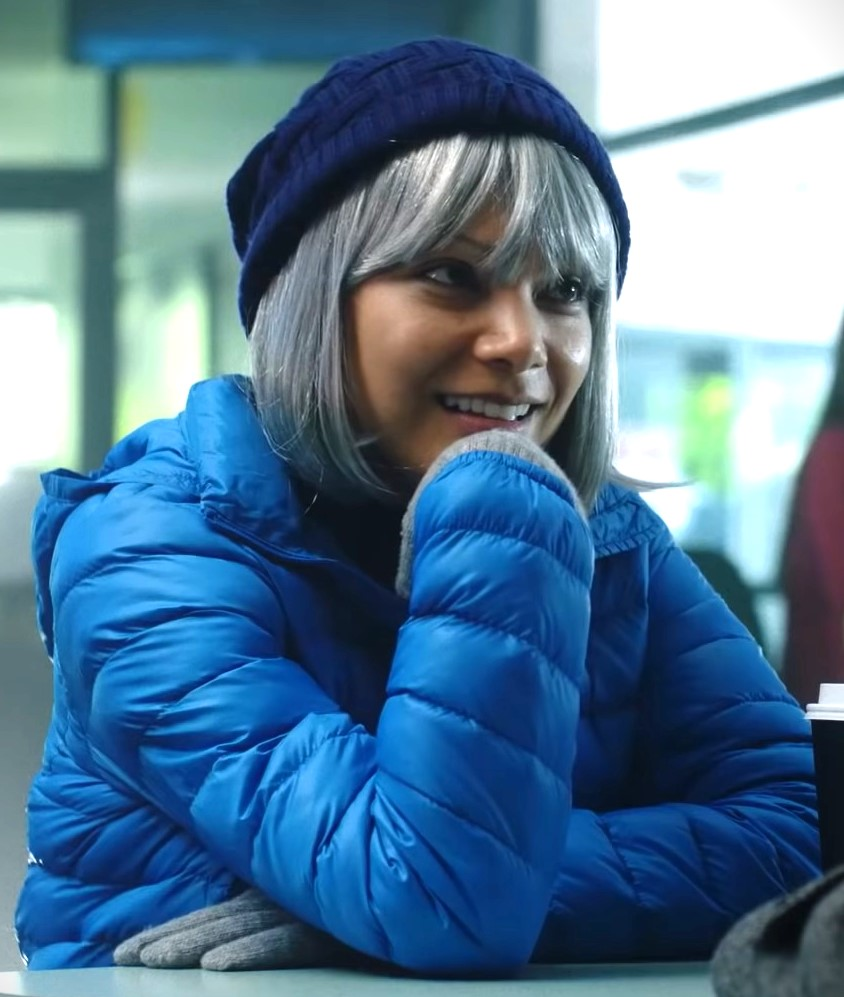
- Gonzaga in 2018
- Born: May 17, 1983 (age 42); Modesto, California, U.S.
- Occupations: Actress; comedian
- Years active: 2010–present
- Known for: The Morning After; She-Hulk: Attorney at Law; True Lies

Ginger Gonzaga (born May 17, 1983) is an American comedian and actress. Since coming to attention hosting Hulu's daily pop culture show The Morning After (2011–12), she has had numerous guest and recurring roles on television and has been in the main cast of such series as Mixology, Wrecked, and She-Hulk: Attorney at Law. She was a co-lead in the 2023 series True Lies, playing Helen Tasker.

== Early life ==
Gonzaga grew up in Modesto, California, where she attended Beyer High School. Her mother is Dutch and her father Filipino. She went to the University of California, Berkeley and University of California, Santa Barbara, where she majored in political science. Gonzaga graduated a year early to train at The Groundlings school, and went on to study improv at Second City and Upright Citizens Brigade.

== Career ==
Gonzaga hosted Hulu's comedic daily pop culture recap show The Morning After. She was a regular on ABC's Mixology, which ran for thirteen episodes. She has also appeared in numerous other television shows, including Togetherness, I'm Dying Up Here, Wrecked, Kidding, and Room 104.

In 2019, she had a role in Paul Rudd's series Living with Yourself. She portrays "the Angry Young Congresswoman" Anabela Ysidro-Campos, also known as simply AYC, a character based on Congresswoman Alexandria Ocasio-Cortez, in the 2020 satirical space comedy Space Force. In January 2021, she was cast in the Disney+ streaming series She-Hulk: Attorney at Law for Marvel Studios, playing Jennifer Walters / She-Hulk's best friend, Nikki.

Gonzaga portrayed Helen Tasker in the 2023 CBS series adaptation of the 1994 film True Lies.

== Personal life ==
Gonzaga was in a relationship with actor Jim Carrey from 2018 to 2019. Gonzaga is bisexual.

== Selected filmography ==
=== Film ===
List of film appearances, with year, title, and role shown
Year	Title	Role	Notes
2012	Ted	Gina	
2014	Someone Marry Barry	Juanita	
2016	Punching Henry	Erica	
2016	Dean	Jill	
2017	Literally, Right Before Aaron	Helen	
2020	Bad Therapy	Miranda	

=== Television ===
List of television appearances, with year, title, and role shown
Year	Title	Role	Notes
2009–2011	In Gayle We Trust	Kim Kaminski	9 episodes
2011–2012	The Morning After	Herself (co-host)	Season 1
2012–2020	Family Guy	Various voices	4 episodes
2013–2014	Legit	Peggy	Recurring role
2014	Mixology	Maya	Main cast
2014	Anger Management	Vanessa / Maureen	3 episodes
2016	Togetherness	Christy	Recurring role (season 2)
2016	Angel from Hell	Kelly	4 episodes
2016–2017	Wrecked	Emma	Main cast (season 1); guest (seasons 2–3)
2016–2019	Those Who Can't	Gloria Guzman	3 episodes
2017	Chance	Lorena	Recurring role (season 2)
2017–2018	I'm Dying Up Here	Maggie	Recurring role
2017–2022	Robot Chicken	Various voices	3 episodes
2018	Champions	Dana	9 episodes
2018	Alone Together	Alia	3 episodes
2018	Kidding	Vivian	5 episodes
2018	Room 104	Vicki	1 episode
2019	Grace and Frankie	Erin	2 episodes
2019	Bajillion Dollar Propertie$	Julianka	2 episodes
2020	Space Force	Anabela Ysidro-Campos (AYC)	2 episodes
2022	Kenan	Carrie	2 episodes
2022	Tuca & Bertie	(voice)	2 episodes
2022	She-Hulk: Attorney at Law	Nikki Ramos	Main cast
2023	True Lies	Helen Tasker	Main cast
2025	Grosse Pointe Garden Society	Cricket	3 episodes
