= Anu Valia =

American filmmaker

- Born: Indiana
- Education: New York University
- Occupations: director, producer, writer, actor
- Years active: 2011–present
- Notable work: Lucia, Before and After, She-Hulk: Attorney at Law

Anu Valia is an American television and film director, writer, actress, and producer best known for writing and directing the short film Lucia, Before and After, which won the 2017 Sundance Film Festival Short Film Jury Award.

== Early life and education ==
Anu Valia was born to a Sikh family in Indiana and grew up in the Greater Chicago area, specifically in the town of Schererville, Indiana. Valia studied dance from age 5, and in high school organized a charity dance performance to support people with HIV/AIDS. After graduating from Morgan Park Academy in 2006, Valia went to school at New York University's Tisch School of the Arts.

== Career ==
From 2011 to 2013, Valia served as a producer at CollegeHumor, appearing as herself in several videos and earning a nomination for a Webby Award.

Valia wrote and directed the short film Lucia, Before and After, about a young woman waiting to have an abortion in Texas. The film won the 2017 Sundance Film Festival Short Film Jury Award. In 2018, Valia joined the Los Angeles production company Majority, which works to create opportunities for female directors.

She has directed episodes of shows including Never Have I Ever, Mixed-ish, Awkwafina Is Nora from Queens, Love Life, A.P. Bio, And Just Like That..., The Big Door Prize and The Afterparty. Additionally, Valia served as a story producer for the television adaptation of My Brother, My Brother and Me.

In July 2020, Valia, who is of Indian descent, was announced as a mentor in the inaugural year of a mentorship program connecting aspiring talent of South Asian descent in the television and film industry with actors, writers, and leaders who could mentor them in Hollywood.

In December 2020, Marvel Studios announced that Valia will be directing episodes of the Disney+ streaming series She-Hulk: Attorney at Law set in the Marvel Cinematic Universe for a 2022 release.

In July 2021, it was announced Anu Valia would direct the film from a screenplay she wrote, with Olivia Wingate set to serve as producer.The film has received support from Cinereach, Hamptons International Film Festival, Tribeca Film Institute.
