= Trixter (company) =

German visual effects studio

- Type: Subsidiary
- Industry: Visual effects
- Founded: 1999; 27 years ago
- Founder: Simone Kraus Townsend; Michael Coldewey
- Headquarters: Germany
- Number of locations: Munich, Berlin and Los Angeles
- Parent: Cinesite (2018–present)
- Website: Official website

Trixter is a German visual effects and computer animation studio with divisions in Munich and Berlin, as well as in Los Angeles. Founded in 1999 by Simone Kraus Townsend and Michael Coldewey, the company was acquired in August 2018 by Cinesite. As of 2025, Trixter's managing directors are Christina Caspers and Holger Voss.

Among the company's credits include Predator: Badlands (2025) The Marvels (2023) Shang-Chi and the Legend of the Ten Rings (2021) Captain Marvel (2019), Black Panther (2018), Spider-Man: Homecoming (2017), Thor: Ragnarok (2017) and Guardians of the Galaxy Vol. 2 (2017).

== Selected credits ==
- Varanasi
- Avengers: Doomsday (2026)
- Predator: Badlands (2025)
- The Sandman (season 2) (2025)
- Caught Stealing (2025)
- Honey Don't! (2025)
- The Family Plan (2023)
- The Marvels (2023)
- I Am Groot (season 2) (2023)
- Foundation (season 2) (2023)
- She-Hulk: Attorney at Law (2022)
- Ms. Marvel (2022)
- The Kangaroo Conspiracy (2022)
- Doctor Strange in the Multiverse of Madness (2022)
- Shang-Chi and the Legend of the Ten Rings (2021)
- Loki (2021–2023)
- Black Widow (2021)
- The Falcon and the Winter Soldier (2021)
- The Kangaroo Chronicles (2020)
- Captain Marvel (2019)
- Black Panther (2018)
- Spider-Man: Homecoming (2017)
- Thor: Ragnarok (2017)
- The Fate of the Furious (2017)
- Guardians of the Galaxy Vol. 2 (2017)
- Independence Day: Resurgence (2016)
- Captain America: Civil War (2016)
- Ant-Man (2015)
- Pixels (2015)
- Avengers: Age of Ultron (2015)
- Captain America: The Winter Soldier (2014)
- Seventh Son (2014)
- White House Down (2013)
- Iron Man 3 (2013)
- The Avengers (2012)
- Cloud Atlas (2012)
- Journey 2: The Mysterious Island (2012)
- Captain America: The First Avenger (2011)
- X-Men: First Class (2011)
- Green Lantern (2011)
- Lilly the Witch: The Journey to Mandolan (2011)
- Iron Man 2 (2010)
- Percy Jackson & the Olympians: The Lightning Thief (2010)
- Lilly the Witch: The Dragon and the Magic Book (2009)
