= Jessica Gao =

American television writer and producer (born 1984)

- Occupations: Television writer, producer
- Years active: 2008–present
- Notable work: The Mighty B! Rick and Morty; Silicon Valley; Back at the Barnyard; She-Hulk: Attorney at Law

Jessica Gao is an American television writer and producer who was creator and head writer of the TV series She-Hulk: Attorney at Law. She also worked on the third season of Rick and Morty, writing the episode "Pickle Rick" and co-creating the reoccurring character of Dr. Wong, and wrote for Silicon Valley, Robot Chicken, The Mighty B!, Back at the Barnyard, Star Wars: Detours, and Kung Fu Panda: Legends of Awesomeness.

== Career ==
After winning the Nickelodeon Writers Fellowship in 2006, Gao began her career writing for the network's shows like The Mighty B!, Back at the Barnyard, Big Time Rush and Kung Fu Panda: Legends of Awesomeness, before leaving to freelance on other shows such as Adult Swim's Robot Chicken, Cartoon Network's The High Fructose Adventures of Annoying Orange, and Disney XD's Lab Rats. Gao has also written for HBO's Silicon Valley, the French series Zip Zip, Seeso/Pluto TV's Bajillion Dollar Propertie$, and Comedy Central's Corporate.

She joined the writing room for the third season of Rick and Morty, acting as story editor on six episodes and writing the episode "Pickle Rick". For writing "Pickle Rick", Gao won the Primetime Emmy for Outstanding Animated Program at the 2018 Primetime Creative Arts Emmy Awards. While working on the show, Gao and the other female writers claimed they were subject to sexual harassment by members of the fanbase that were upset about the show hiring women in the writing room. Gao and Rick and Morty co-creator, Dan Harmon, collaborated on a podcast series entitled "Whiting Wongs" that discussed race and privilege in Hollywood. Gao also wrote and co-executive produced the second season of the show Take My Wife.

Gao left Rick and Morty after the third season to develop a sitcom for ABC, which landed a pilot episode order in 2019, directed by Jude Weng. The show revolved around a Chinese-American woman's relationship with her family. ABC passed on the sitcom, but the series was being shopped to other networks. In July 2019, she was chosen to write the script for the upcoming movie based on Sweet Valley High. In November 2019, she was hired as the lead writer for the Disney+ show She-Hulk: Attorney at Law.

== Personal life ==
Gao is engaged to Truck Torrence, who is known for creating emojis of Marvel characters under the name 100 Soft.

== Filmography ==
Year	Title	Credited as		Notes
Year	Title	Writer	Producer	Notes
2008–09	Back at the Barnyard	Yes	No	Episodes: "War of the Pranks" and "The Sun Cow"
2008–11	The Mighty B!	Yes	No	35 episodes
2010–11	Big Time Rush	Yes	No	6 episodes
2011	Kung Fu Panda: Legends of Awesomeness	Yes	No	Episode: "Fluttering Finger Mindslip"
2012–13	Robot Chicken	Yes	No	9 episodes
2012–13	The High Fructose Adventures of Annoying Orange	Yes	No	4 episodes
2014	Lab Rats	Yes	No	Episode: "Trent Gets Schooled"
2014	Silicon Valley	Yes	No	Episode: "Signaling Risk"
2015	Zip Zip	Yes	No	Episode: "Rained In"
2016	Bajillion Dollar Propertie$	Yes	No	Episodes: "Roger Me Rightly" and "Baxter's Confession"
2017	Rick and Morty	Yes	No	Episode: "Pickle Rick", also executive story editor
2017	The Memestar Chronicles	Yes	No	Episode: "Look Mom, I'm on TV"
2018	Take My Wife	Yes	Yes	Co-executive producer, wrote 2 episodes
2018	Corporate	Yes	Yes	Supervising producer, wrote 2 episodes
2022	Easter Sunday	No	Executive	
2022	She-Hulk: Attorney at Law	Yes	Executive	Creator and head writer, wrote 3 episodes, also actor in "Whose Show Is This?"
TBA	Stepdude	Yes	No	Co-wrote with Scot Armstrong, Tracy Oliver, Rodney Rothman, and Eric Appel
TBA	The Undesirables	TBA	Executive	

== Awards and nominations ==
Year	Award	Category	Work	Result	Ref.
2015	Writers Guild of America Awards	Comedy Series	Silicon Valley	Nominated	
2015	Writers Guild of America Awards	New Series	Silicon Valley	Nominated	
2018	Primetime Emmy Awards	Outstanding Animated Program	Rick and Morty (for "Pickle Rick")	Won	
