= London Film Critics Circle Awards 2010 =

British film awards ceremony

31st London Film Critics Circle Awards

11 February 2011

Film of the Year:
The Social Network

British Film of the Year:
The King's Speech

The 31st London Film Critics Circle Awards, honouring the best in film for 2010, were announced by the London Film Critics Circle on 11 February 2011.

== Winners and nominees ==
=== Film of the Year ===
The Social Network

- Black Swan
- The Kids Are All Right
- The King's Speech
- Toy Story 3

=== British Film of the Year ===
The King's Speech

- 127 Hours
- Another Year
- The Arbor
- Monsters

=== Foreign Language Film of the Year ===
Of Gods and Men • France

- Dogtooth • Greece
- I Am Love • Italy
- The Secret in Their Eyes • Argentina
- Uncle Boonmee Who Can Recall His Past Lives • Thailand

=== Director of the Year ===
David Fincher – The Social Network

- Darren Aronofsky – Black Swan
- Joel and Ethan Coen – True Grit
- Christopher Nolan – Inception
- Apichatpong Weerasethakul – Uncle Boonmee Who Can Recall His Past Lives

=== British Director of the Year ===
Tom Hooper – The King's Speech

- Clio Barnard – The Arbor
- Danny Boyle – 127 Hours
- Mike Leigh – Another Year
- Christopher Nolan – Inception

=== Screenwriter of the Year ===
Aaron Sorkin – The Social Network

- Chris Morris, Jesse Armstrong and Sam Bain – Four Lions
- Lisa Cholodenko and Stuart Blumberg – The Kids Are All Right
- David Seidler – The King's Speech
- Joel and Ethan Coen – True Grit

=== Breakthrough British Filmmaker ===
Gareth Edwards – Monsters

- Banksy – Exit Through the Gift Shop
- Clio Barnard – The Arbor
- J Blakeson – The Disappearance of Alice Creed
- Chris Morris – Four Lions

=== Actor of the Year ===
Colin Firth – The King's Speech

- Jeff Bridges – True Grit
- Jesse Eisenberg – The Social Network
- Ryan Gosling – Blue Valentine
- Édgar Ramírez – Carlos

=== Actress of the Year ===
Annette Bening – The Kids Are All Right

- Jennifer Lawrence – Winter's Bone
- Natalie Portman – Black Swan
- Noomi Rapace – The Girl with the Dragon Tattoo
- Hailee Steinfeld – True Grit

=== British Actor of the Year ===
Christian Bale – The Fighter

- Riz Ahmed – Four Lions
- Jim Broadbent – Another Year
- Colin Firth – The King's Speech
- Andrew Garfield – Never Let Me Go

=== British Actress of the Year ===
Lesley Manville – Another Year

- Helena Bonham Carter – The King's Speech
- Rosamund Pike – Barney's Version
- Ruth Sheen – Another Year
- Tilda Swinton – I Am Love

=== British Supporting Actor of the Year ===
Andrew Garfield – The Social Network

- David Bradley – Another Year
- Pierce Brosnan – The Ghost Writer
- Tom Hardy – Inception
- Peter Wight – Another Year

=== British Supporting Actress of the Year ===
Olivia Williams – The Ghost Writer

- Helena Bonham Carter – Alice in Wonderland
- Christine Bottomley – The Arbor
- Minnie Driver – Barney's Version
- Rosamund Pike – Made in Dagenham

=== Young British Performer of the Year ===
Conor McCarron – Neds

- Jessica Barden – Tamara Drewe
- Will Poulter – The Chronicles of Narnia: The Voyage of the Dawn Treader
- Saoirse Ronan – The Way Back
- Thomas Turgoose – The Scouting Book for Boys

=== Dilys Powell Award ===
- Kristin Scott Thomas
