= Natalie Gavin =

British actress

- Born: 27 July 1988 (age 38); Bradford, West Yorkshire, England
- Occupation: Actress
- Years active: 2006–present
- Known for: Prisoners' Wives; The Syndicate; Jericho; Shameless

Natalie Gavin (born 27 July 1988) is an English actress. On television, she is known for her roles in the BBC dramas Prisoners' Wives (2012) and The Syndicate (2013), and the ITV drama Jericho (2016).

== Early life and education ==
Gavin was born in Bradford. She grew up in the Bradford neighbourhoods of West Bowling and Buttershaw, before moving to the Bradford neighbourhood and town of Denholme as a teenager. Gavin has a mum named Susan, a dad named John and brother named Shaun. John knew Andrea Dunbar as he worked and associated with her father. Gavin and her family lived on the same street that Andrea and her family did, which is named Brafferton Arbor, in Buttershaw. Gavin would later go on to play Andrea in the 2010 film The Arbor, which was filmed on the same street.

Gavin was educated at Buttershaw High School. She has a degree in drama from the University of Huddersfield in Huddersfield, West Yorkshire. She had to put her degree on hold for a few years, after being cast in Shameless during her second year of the course.

== Career ==
Gavin made her professional acting debut in two episodes of the Channel 4 comedy series Shameless, as Anna Sampson.

Gavin's first main film role was as The Girl in the 2010 film The Arbor, which dramatised the early life of Andrea Dunbar. Her first main TV role was as Lou in the BBC drama Prisoners' Wives, which she portrayed for six episodes. Later that year, she began appearing in the BBC medical drama Casualty, in the recurring role of Faith Portman.

In 2013, Gavin appeared in the second series of The Syndicate, a BBC drama, as Becky. In 2014, she starred in the British drama film The Knife That Killed Me. In 2016, Gavin appeared as Alma Capstick in the ITV drama Jericho.

In 2019, Gavin appeared in two BBC dramas; Gentleman Jack and Line of Duty, and portrayed the role of Nadine Murgatroyd in the Channel 4 school drama Ackley Bridge.

== Personal life ==
Gavin lives in the Bradford neighbourhood and town of Denholme, and previously lived in the Bradford neighbourhood of Clayton. Her favourite place is the Bradford village of Haworth.

== Filmography ==
=== Film ===
Year	Title	Role
2010	The Arbor	The Girl
2011	Jasmine	Hayley
2014	The Knife That Killed Me	Marlene
2014	The crucible	Mary Warren
2015	Hector	Hazel
2015	Radical Hardcore	Woman
2021	Ali & Ava	Dawn
2023	Sky Peals	Tara

=== Television ===
Year	Title	Role	Notes
2006–2007	Shameless	Anna Sampson	2 episodes
2007	The Chase	Chelsie	1 episode
2012	Prisoners' Wives	Lou	Main role; 6 episodes
2012–2013	Casualty	Faith Portman	Recurring role; 4 episodes
2013	The Syndicate	Becky	Main role; 6 episodes
2016	Jericho	Alma Capstick	Main role; 8 episodes
2019-2022	Gentleman Jack	Alice Hardcastle	4 episodes
2019	Line of Duty	PS Tina Tranter	2 episodes
2019	Ackley Bridge	Nadine Murgatroyd	Recurring role; 4 episodes
2020	The English Game	Anne Stokes	1 episode
2020	Yorkshire Firefighters	Narrator	
2021	Time	Officer Jardine	3 Episodes
2021	You Don't Know Me	Angel (Trap Mother)	1 episode
2022	Red Rose	Rachel Davies	Main role; 8 episodes
2023	Bodies	Sarah Mannix	Recurring role; 3 episodes
2023	The Long Shadow	Georgie Showalter	1 episode
2024	Passenger	Joanne Wells	Recurring role (6 episodes)
2025	The Hack	DC Susan Gangridge	2 episodes
