= Alex Corina =

English artist

Alexander John Corina, known as Alex Corina (born 10 October 1950 in Bradford), is an artist and community worker based in Garston, Liverpool.

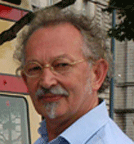
Alex Corina

Alex Corina was born in Bradford, where he attended Buttershaw Comprehensive School and Bradford College of Art. He moved in 1986 to Liverpool, where he worked as a civil servant for the Drugs Prevention and Community Safety Unit. Corina is known in Liverpool for his picture the Mona Lennon which features the Mona Lisa, John Lennon and the Liverpool waterfront in the background. It is a work that aims to represent Liverpool's past, present and future.

Corina became a full-time artist following the success of Mona Lennon in 2003. He has exhibited work in Liverpool, Bradford, Leeds and Keele, particularly in the period leading up to Liverpool’s European Capital of Culture year in 2008.

In 2007, Corina was named as one of Bradford College's 175 heroes as a celebration of 175 years providing education and training in Bradford.

Corina is one of the leaders behind the idea of Garston Cultural Village, which is a campaign to encourage redevelopment in Garston. On 31 May 2008, Garston declared 'Cultural Independence' at the Garston Embassy, formerly The Wellington School.

His work is described as expressionist in style, often combining pastel and acrylic techniques to depict scenes from Liverpool’s cultural and urban environment. Corina has continued to produce work associated with Liverpool’s cultural identity, including new versions of Mona Lennon and projects linked to community and cultural initiatives in the city.

In 2022, Corina recreated his Mona Lennon artwork as part of a project linked to Liverpool’s Eurovision events, with proceeds supporting local initiatives assisting Ukrainian refugees. He also exhibited a series of paintings depicting Sefton Park to mark the park’s 150th anniversary.

== Politics ==
Corina's father Joe Corina, described by Bob Cryer MP as 'a well-known orator in Bradford', fostered his interest in Politics. When Between 1980 and 1983 Alex was elected to Bradford City Council as a Labour Councillor for Wibsey Ward.

On 5 August 1983, after leading the National Union of Public Employees' Bradford Health Service Branch during the health workers' dispute of 1981–82, Corina led the Thornton View Hospital Occupation campaigning against the closure of the 82 bed long-stay geriatric hospital as branch secretary. The occupation lasted for over 2 years and was one of the longest ever hospital occupations.

On 3 May 2007, Corina stood for election as a City Councillor for the ward of Cressington, as an Independent, in the Liverpool Council election, 2007. He gained 316 votes.
