= Kamal Kaan =

English writer and actor

- Born: Bradford, West Yorkshire
- Education: University of Cambridge; Glasgow Caledonian University
- Writing career
- Genres: Drama, Comedy, Poetry

Kamal Kaan is a British playwright, screenwriter and actor. He was listed in Prolific North's top scriptwriters of 2017. He also served as Script Consultant for Clio Barnard on the BAFTA nominated Outstanding British film Ali & Ava.

== Biography ==
Kaan was born and raised in Bradford, West Yorkshire. He was educated at Dixon's City Academy and then received a scholarship to attend the University of Cambridge, where he read Architecture. He was then awarded a scholarship from Shed productions to complete a Masters in TV Fiction Writing at Glasgow Caledonian University. Kaan is from a working-class background and his father was textile mill worker. He is one of ten siblings and was the first from his family to go away to university.

== Career ==
=== Theatre ===
Kaan was selected for The Emerging Writers Group 2016 at The Bush Theatre, London and for the BBC Writersroom Drama Room in 2017. His first professional commission was in collaboration with artist David Shearing: and it all comes down to this...

In 2020, Kaan wrote Us (Post 23/3). The play detailed the disproportionate impact of COVID-19 on British Asian communities and was described by Emma Clayton in Telegraph and Argus as "darkly humorous".

Kaan wrote a modern adaptation of Antigone, Aaliyah: After Antigone, for Bradford-based theatre company Freedom Studios in 2021. It was described as 'the most radical rewrite' by Michael Billington in The Guardian and was performed to a live audience and streamed online to a remote audience simultaneously. Writing in The Times Literary Supplement, Marchella Ward described it as 'an ancient play of the moment' and 'strikingly modern'. The show gained four stars in The Stage as a work of 'a necessary rage, and one that we should see more of in the stories that theatre tells'.

In 2022, Kaan wrote Amma, a virtual reality play about Bangladeshi women's experiences of the War of Independence.

=== Radio ===
Kaan won the BBC Radio 3 Verb New Voices 2015 with his audio drama as the cloud takes its last breath.

Since then he has written a number of radio dramas for BBC Radio 4, including:

- Breaking Up With Bradford, starring Luke Newberry and described as a 'love letter' to Bradford. The Spectator called the drama 'refreshingly different'.
- The Headline Ballads: Whilst the Water Weeps Next to the Water, a drama-documentary about the Boxing day floods in 2015, paralleled with the flooding in Bangladesh.
- Father's Land in Mother Tongue, starring Bhavna Limbachia. The story reflects on the 1971 Bangladesh Liberation War and was inspired by the poetry of Rabindranath Tagore.
- Bangla Bantams, starring Nina Wadia and Sudha Bhuchar. The story is based on the real life story of The Bangla Bantams, a British-Bangladeshi football fan group of Bradford City AFC

In 2022, Kaan wrote 'The Greatest Story Ever Told' for the Northern Broadsides Winter Tales podcast series.

=== Screen ===
Kaan worked as Script Consultant with writer and director Clio Barnard on the BAFTA nominated Outstanding British film Ali & Ava. He helped to shape the story, giving feedback on treatments, scripts, locations and character research. In The Observer, Mark Kermode described the film as a 'pitch perfect Bradford love story'.

=== Acting ===
Kaan's work for screen includes Five Days (series 2), The Syndicate, Doctors, Ali & Ava.

On stage, Kaan has appeared in: The Chef Show, directed by Stefan Escreet, winner of the Rural Touring Show Awards 2018. In 2021 he appeared in Full English (2021) by Bent Architect, winner of the Best Stage Production, 2021 at the Asian Media Awards.

Other credits include: Cymbeline (2008) directed by Sir Trevor Nunn, starring James Norton. Peter Pan (2008) and the Pembroke Players Japan Tour of A Midsummer Night's Dream (2008). Boy With a Suitcase (2010) by Mike Kenny at the Arcola Theatre. Plan D by Hannah Khalil (2010). Brief Encounters Freedom Studios (2015). North Country Directed by Alex Chisholm (2016). Wanted (2016) Leeds Playhouse. This Space Is Occupied (2018) Bent Architect.

== Works ==
- Bangla Bantams (2022) – Afternoon Drama, BBC Radio 4. Co-written with Mary Cooper.
- Ali & Ava (2021) – Feature Film, Script Consultant.
- Aaliyah: After Antigone (2021) Stage play with Freedom Studios. Premiered at Impact Hub Bradford and livestreamed.
- A Love Story on Leeds Road (2021) An Audio-Documentary for Bradford Producing Hub.
- Decades: and after we sailed a thousand skies (2021) - Stage and Screen play. Premiered at The Leeds Playhouse for the 50th Anniversary.
- Lockdown Diaries (2020) – Stage and screen play. Premiered online for Skipton Camerata.
- Us (Post 23/3) (2020) – Screenplay. Premiered online for Naïve Theatre and supported by Camden People's Theatre.
- Father's Land in Mother Tongue (2019) – Premiered on BBC Radio 4, Afternoon Drama.
- On Hearing the First Cuckoo in Spring (2018) – Stage and Radio play. Premiered at The Leeds Playhouse and BBC Radio Leeds.
- Breaking Up With Bradford (2017) – Premiered on BBC Radio 4, Afternoon Drama.
- The Headline Ballads: Whilst the Water Weeps Next to the Water (2016 & 2017) – Premiered on BBC Radio 4.
- as the cloud takes its last breath (2016) – Audio Installation. Premiered at St. Chad's Chapel, recommissioned for the Durham Book Festival.
- The Rose and Bulbul (2016 & 2017) – Site Specific play. Premiered at Stockwood Gardens and UK tour.
- as the cloud takes its last breath (2015) – Audio Monologue. Premiered on BBC Radio 3.
- The Weather Machine (2015) – Stage play and Installation. Premiered at Stage@Leeds.
- and it all comes down to this... (2012) – Stage play and Installation. Premiered at Stage@Leeds.
- if anyone wonders why rocks breakdown (2011) – Audio Installation. Premiered at part of Light Night Leeds.
