= Buttershaw =

Area of Bradford in West Yorkshire, England

Coordinates: 53.7603°N 1.7964°W

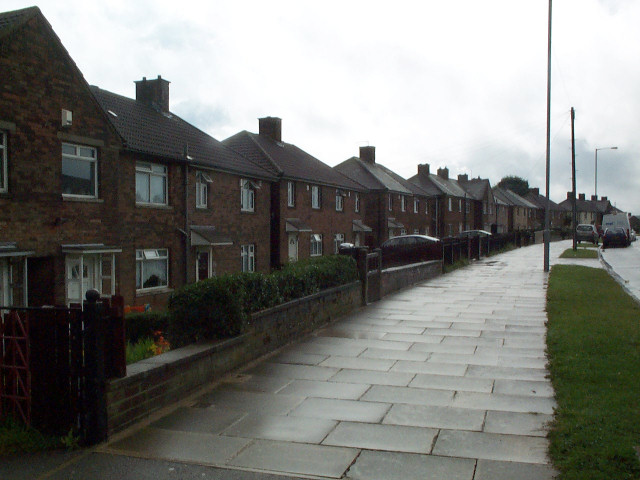
- Houses on Reevy Road West in Buttershaw

- Location within West Yorkshire
- Civil parish: Buttershaw
- Metropolitan borough: City of Bradford
- Metropolitan county: West Yorkshire
- Region: Yorkshire and the Humber
- Country: England
- Sovereign state: United Kingdom
- Post town: BRADFORD
- Postcode district: BD6
- Police: West Yorkshire
- Fire: West Yorkshire
- Ambulance: Yorkshire

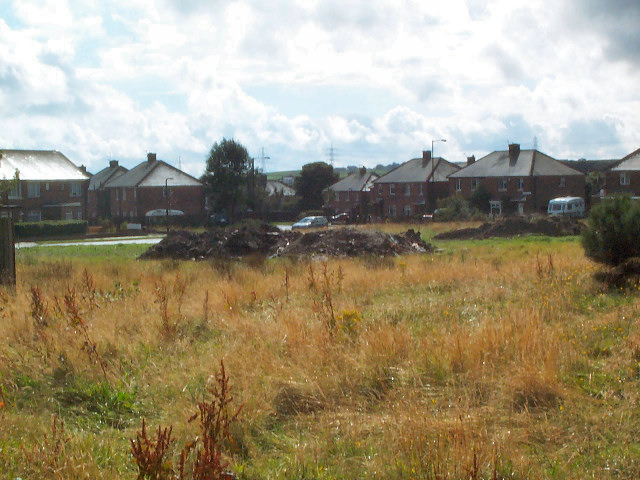
Wasteland and housing in Buttershaw.

Buttershaw is a residential area of Bradford, West Yorkshire, England. It is bounded by Horton Bank Top to the north, Wibsey to the east, Woodside to the south and Shelf to the west.

Buttershaw consists mostly of 1940s council housing with the building starting in 1947 and continuing until the 1960s. Since the 1980s, many of the older homes around Buttershaw (including some of the blocks of flats that appeared in several of the film Rita, Sue and Bob Too's scenes) have been demolished to be replaced by new homes.

== History ==
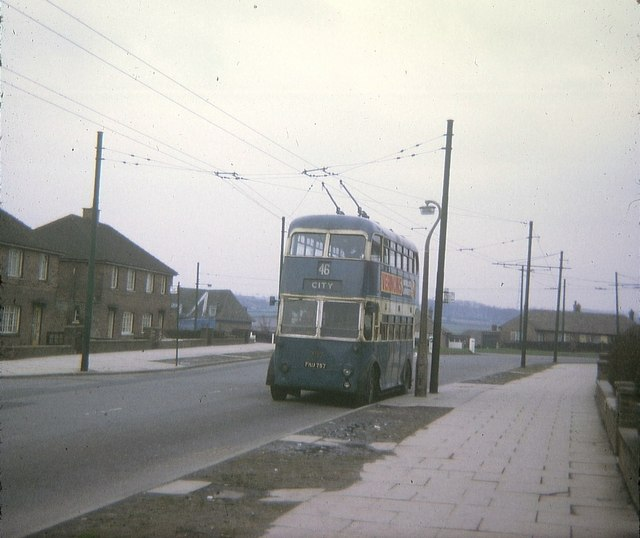
The Bradford trolleybus terminus in Buttershaw.

The original settlement of Buttershaw was about 1 mile (1.6 km) to the east, which is why Buttershaw's church of St Paul's is in Wibsey. The settlement moved west in the 19th century with the building of Bottomley's Mill on Halifax Road and the construction of workers' cottages (such as Bottomley Street) adjacent to the existing settlement of Beck Hill.

The construction of the council estate moved the centre of the district northward on to what was then farm land, which prior to the 20th century had been extensively mined. The Ordnance Survey map of 1852 shows the density of mines across the area, and that for 1910 shows the conversion to farm land.

== Education ==
Primary schools in the area include Farfield Primary & Nursery School, Reevy Hill Primary School and St Paul's Church of England Primary School. The rugby union player Frank Whitcombe Jr attended Buttershaw St Paul's Church School

Buttershaw Business and Enterprise College is the main secondary school serving the area. It opened in 1956 as Buttershaw Secondary School on Reevy Road. It has since been renamed Buttershaw Comprehensive School, and over the years it has evolved into an Upper, then High School. 2008 saw the opening of a new building at the school. As the new building was opened the school was renamed Buttershaw Business and Enterprise College.

== Appearances in popular culture ==
Buttershaw's council estates gained notoriety in 1986 when they were featured as the setting for most of the scenes in the film Rita, Sue and Bob Too, based on plays by local resident Andrea Dunbar. The estate gained something of a cult status thanks to the film, although at first there was much discontent among local people who complained that it further tarnished the estate's already undesirable reputation.

Clio Barnard's film The Arbor was partly shot in Buttershaw, and in 2013, Buttershaw was the setting for her film The Selfish Giant, which had a limited release but was generally well-received by critics.

== See also ==
- Listed buildings in Bradford (Royds Ward)
