= Listed buildings in Clayton, West Yorkshire =

Clayton, West Yorkshire contains the civil parish of Clayton and the ward of Clayton and Fairweather Green in the metropolitan borough of the City of Bradford, West Yorkshire, England. The parish and ward contain 68 listed buildings that are recorded in the National Heritage List for England. All the listed buildings are designated at Grade II, the lowest of the three grades, which is applied to "buildings of national importance and special interest". The parish and ward contain the village of Clayton and the surrounding area. It is largely residential, and the area to the west of the village is rural. Most of the listed buildings are houses, cottages and associated structures, farmhouses and farm buildings. The other listed buildings include two churches, a public house, a former workhouse, two schools, a village hall, and the chimney of a former factory.

== Buildings ==
Name and location	Photograph	Date	Notes
Langberries Farmhouse; 53.77710°N 1.82674°W	—	16th century (probable)	The farmhouse has a timber framed core, and was encased in sandstone in the 18th century. It has a stone slate roof, two storeys and a cellar. The windows are mullioned, and some have been altered.
Town Bottom Farmhouse and barn 53.78525°N 1.81967°W	—	16th century	The farmhouse has a timber framed core, it was encased in gritstone in the 17th century, and altered and partly refaced in sandstone in about 1800. The roof is in stone slate with saddlestones, and there are two storeys. The barn at the east end projects to the south. The windows are mullioned, some have hood moulds, and some also have quoined surrounds.
1, 3 and 5 Broadfolds; 53.78324°N 1.81824°W		1649	A farmhouse that was rebuilt in about 1709 and later altered, dividing it into three cottages. The cottages are in sandstone, with a stone slate roof and two storeys. The doorway has a dated and initialled frieze incorporating an earlier dated and initialled panel. The windows are mullioned, and at the rear is a double-transomed stair window.
The Syke Farmhouse and Reva Syke; 53.77878°N 1.82134°W	—	17th century (probable)	A farmhouse and cottage, the farmhouse the earlier and largely rebuilt in the 18th century, and the cottage added in the 19th century. They are in sandstone, partly rendered, with quoins, and stone slate roofs with saddlestones and shaped kneelers. The doorways have squared jambs, the windows are mullioned, and there is a 19th-century canted bay window.
8 and 10 Grange Fold; 53.79984°N 1.81839°W	—	Mid to late 17th century	The main range of a former farmhouse, it is in gritstone, with a string course, and a stone slate roof with a saddlestone. There are two storeys, and the doorways have chamfered jambs. The windows in the upper floor have single lights, and in the ground floor they have two lights and mullions.
12 Grange Fold; 53.79983°N 1.81825°W	—	Mid to late 17th century	The cross-wing of a former farmhouse, it is in gritstone, and has a stone slate roof with a saddlestone and kneelers to the front gable end. There are two storeys, the doorway has a chamfered lintel, and the windows are mullioned, with some mullions removed. The windows in the ground floor have round-headed lights and hood moulds.
181, 183, 189, 193 and 195 Thornton Old Road, barn and outbuilding 53.79544°N 1.80324°W	—	Late 17th century	An irregular group of cottages formed out of the former Crossley Hall between the late 18th and the early 19th centuries, and associated outbuildings. The cottages are in sandstone and gritstone, with quoins, a string course, and stone slate roofs with saddlestones and shaped kneelers. Most of the windows are mullioned, with some mullions removed, and there is a mullioned and transomed stair window. Some doorways have squared jambs, and one has a chamfered lintel. Within the group is a garden wall containing a doorway with a moulded architrave. Extending from the northwest corner is a range of outbuildings linking with a barn.
2 and 4 Ramsden Place; 53.78554°N 1.82045°W	—	Late 17th or 18th century	A farmhouse divided into two cottages in about 1800. The building is in rendered gritstone with a stone slate roof and two storeys. The doorway has a quoined surround, and a lintel with an ogee chamfered surround rising to a star point. Some of the windows are mullioned and others have had the mullions removed.
Maltkiln; 53.78152°N 1.82093°W	—	18th century	A farmhouse converted in about 1820 to a row of back to back houses. They are in stone with quoins, and stone slate roofs of varying heights with saddlestones and shaped kneelers. The houses have two storeys, doorways with squared jambs, one with a pediment, and windows, some with single lights, and the others mullioned.
2 Town End Road; 53.78552°N 1.82000°W		1752	A sandstone house at the end of a row, with quoins, and a stone slate roof with saddlestones and kneelers. There are two storeys, the doorway has squared jambs, and the mullions have been removed from the windows. In the gable end is a date plaque.
72, 74 and 76 Clayton Lane; 53.78020°N 1.82584°W	—	1770	A house divided into three in the 19th century, it is in sandstone with a stone slate roof. There are two storeys, the doorways have squared jambs, and the windows are mullioned with some mullions removed.
8–16 Holts Lane; 53.78616°N 1.82137°W	—	1770	A row of five sandstone cottages in a terrace, with a stone slate roof and a saddlestone and kneeler to No. 16. There are two storeys, the doorways have squared jambs, the windows are mullioned with some mullions removed, and on No. 12 is an initialled and dated plaque.
Upper Penny Hill Farmhouse, barn and stables 53.77784°N 1.81911°W	—	1772	A farmhouse and barn in one range and stables at right angles, they are in sandstone with quoins, and a stone slate roof with saddlestones and prominent kneelers. There are two storeys, the house has three bays, and contains a doorway with squared jambs and a dated lintel, three-light mullioned windows and, at the rear, a mullioned and double-transomed stair window.
12 and 14 Back Fold; 53.78558°N 1.82004°W	—	Late 18th century	A pair of sandstone cottages with console brackets to the eaves, and a stone slate roof with a saddlestone to the gable end and kneelers. There are two storeys, the doorways have squared jambs, and the windows are mullioned with two lights.
237–245 Bradford Road; 53.78468°N 1.81895°W	—	Late 18th century	A row of five sandstone cottages with stone slate roofs and two storeys that were converted in about 1820. Nos. 237 and 239 were originally one house, later divided. The doorways are paired in the centre, above them are single-light windows, and outside these are two-light mullioned windows. Nos. 241 and 243 have two-light mullioned windows, and No. 245 has single-light windows on the front and two-light mullioned windows in the gable end.
19 and 21 Clayton Road; 53.78256°N 1.80071°W	—	Late 18th century	Probably a single house, later divided into two, it is in sandstone, with quoins and a stone slate roof. There are two storeys, the doorway has squared jambs, and the windows are mullioned with some mullions removed.
18 and 20 Holts Lane; 53.78613°N 1.82153°W	—	Late 18th century	No 20 is the earlier, No. 18 being an infill in the early 19th century. They are two cottages in a terrace in sandstone with stone slate roofs. There are two storeys, the doorway has squared jambs, there is one single-light window, and the other windows are mullioned. In No. 20 is a blind three-light mullioned window, the outer lights being round-headed.
6 and 8 Town End Road; 53.78559°N 1.82024°W	—	Late 18th century	A pair of sandstone cottages with a stone slate roof. There are two storeys, the doorways have squared jambs, and the windows are mullioned with some mullions removed.
10 Town End Road and 2 Beck Fold; 53.78564°N 1.82029°W	—	Late 18th century	A pair of sandstone cottages with quoins, and a stone slate roof. There are two storeys, the doorways have squared jambs, some windows have single lights, and others were mullioned and the mullions have been removed.
Cockin Lane Farmhouse; 53.78188°N 1.84206°W	—	Late 18th century	The farmhouse is in sandstone with quoins, and a stone slate roof with prominent kneelers. There are two storeys and three bays. The doorway has a plain surround, above it is a small round-headed window, and the other windows are mullioned.
Lower Lidget Farmhouse and barn 53.78433°N 1.80277°W	—	Late 18th century	The farmhouse and barn are in sandstone, with quoins, bracketed eaves, stone slate roofs, and two storeys. The house has three bays, the outer windows are mullioned with two lights, and the central window has a single light. The barn projects to the right, and contains blocked lunettes, and a central recessed portal under a large lintel.
Lower Penny Hill Farmhouse, stable and barn 53.77846°N 1.81778°W	—	Late 18th century	The stable and barn were added to the farmhouse in 1840 as a south wing. The buildings are in sandstone with stone slate roofs. The farmhouse has two storeys and three bays, and contains quoins, and a doorway with squared jambs. Above the doorway is a single-light window, and the other windows are mullioned with three lights.
Barn, Town Bottom Farm; 53.78541°N 1.81978°W	—	Late 18th century	The barn is in sandstone, with block brackets to the eaves, and a stone slate roof. It contains a partly blocked portal, with a dovecote above, and a round-headed window. The openings have squared surrounds.
2, 12 and 14 Beck Fold; 53.78576°N 1.82033°W	—	c. 1800	A row of sandstone cottages with block brackets to the eaves, stone slate roofs, and two storeys. The doorways have squared jambs, and the windows are mullioned with two lights.
2–6 and 10 Broadfolds; 53.78308°N 1.81795°W		c. 1800	A block of sandstone cottages with a stone slate roof and two storeys. Some windows are mullioned and the others have single lights.
22 and 24 Holts Lane; 53.78610°N 1.82171°W	—	c. 1800	A pair of sandstone cottages at the end of a terrace, they have a sill band, block brackets to the eaves, a stone slate roof, and two storeys. No. 22 has plain windows, in the centre of the upper floor is a blind round-headed panel, and the doorway has squared jambs and a shallow flat hood. In No. 24 the windows are mullioned with two lights, and the doorway has squared jambs and a cornice hood on consoles.
1, 3 and 5 Ramsden Place; 53.78543°N 1.82037°W	—	c. 1800	A row of three sandstone cottages with a stone slate roof. There are two storeys and the cottages contain doorways with squared jambs and two-light mullioned windows.
Cresswell Farmhouse and barn 53.78541°N 1.83721°W	—	c. 1800	A sandstone farmhouse and barn in one range, with a stone slate roof and saddlestones. There are two storeys, and in the house are mullioned windows and a doorway with squared jambs. The barn contains a segmental-arched cart entry and flanking lunettes.
Maltkiln House; 53.78624°N 1.82041°W	—	c. 1800	A house and a later row of cottages in sandstone with stone slate roofs and two storeys. The house has a sill band, console brackets to the eaves, an external staircase to the upper floor, and a rendered front. The windows are mullioned, and at the rear is a mullioned and transomed stair window. The cottages date from about 1820 and have block brackets to the eaves, stone porches, and windows, initially mullioned and with many mullions removed.
Barn, Mavis Farm; 53.78189°N 1.84162°W	—	c. 1800	The barn is in stone and has kneelers to the gable ends. It contains a segmental archway, above which is a round-headed window flanked by dovecote openings.
Sun Wood Farmhouse and barn 53.78126°N 1.83771°W	—	c. 1800	Originally three cottages and a barn to the north. They are in sandstone and have stone slate roofs with kneelers on the gable ends of the barn. There are two storeys, three doorways with squared jambs, and mullioned windows.
9–13 Back Lane; 53.77255°N 1.81983°W	—	Late 18th to early 19th century	A row of sandstone cottages with quoins, and stone slate roofs. There are two storeys, the doorways have plain squared surrounds, and the windows are mullioned with two lights.
Paradise Farmhouse Restaurant; 53.78265°N 1.80090°W		Late 18th to early 19th century	A pair of cottages and a barn in sandstone with stone slate roofs, the barn was rebuilt in 1857, and the parts were later combined. The house has a band, and dentilled eaves, and contains single-light and mullioned windows. In the barn are quoins, and it contains a large segmental archway with voussoirs and a keystone, and other segmental-arched openings.
7–13 Beck Fold; 53.78582°N 1.82004°W	—	c. 1800–20	A row of sandstone cottages with block brackets to the eaves, stone slate roofs, and two storeys. The doorways have squared jambs, and the windows were mullioned and the mullions have been removed.
6–12 Brook Lane; 53.77855°N 1.82846°W	—	c. 1800–20	A row of four sandstone cottages with a sill band, moulded eaves, and stone slate roofs. There are two storeys, and each cottage has a three-light mullioned window in both floors, and a single-light window above the doorway.
1–5 Green End; 53.78461°N 1.81905°W	—	c. 1800–20	A block of sandstone cottages at right angles to the road, back to back with cottages on Bradford Road. They have stone slate roofs, two storeys, doorways with squared jambs, and mullioned windows with two lights.
6–14 Ramsden Place; 53.78548°N 1.82068°W	—	c. 1800–20	A row of sandstone cottages with stone slate roofs, partly stepped. They have two storeys and contain doorways with squared jambs, single-light and mullioned windows.
Carter House and barn 53.77441°N 1.85178°W	—	c. 1800–20	The farmhouse and a later attached barn are in sandstone with a stone slate roof and two storeys. The house has a doorway with squared jambs, and the windows are mullioned. The barn is taller and has arched openings and iron ventilators on the roof.
Low Fold Farmhouse and barn 53.77313°N 1.84840°W	—	c. 1800–20	The farmhouse and barn are in sandstone, and have stone slate roofs with saddlestones and kneelers. The house has two storeys, doorways with squared jambs, and mullioned windows, some of which have been altered. The barn was added later, it is taller and has prominent ventilators.
Old Farmhouse and barn 53.78243°N 1.83675°W	—	c. 1800–20	The barn and farmhouse are in sandstone, with stone slate roofs and two storeys. The house has a doorway with squared jambs, and the windows are mullioned. The barn is taller and projects, and contains a segmental archway with voussoirs flanked by lunettes.
The Black Bull Public House; 53.78450°N 1.81911°W		c. 1800–30	This consists of a two-bay public house, and a single-bay cottage slightly recessed on the left. They are in sandstone with stone slate roofs, two storeys, and mullioned windows with two lights. The public house has a band, and a doorway with pilaster strips and a shallow cornice on consoles.
224–230 Bradford Road; 53.78450°N 1.81811°W	—	1815	A row of sandstone cottages in a terrace, with a sill band, block brackets to the eaves, and a stone slate roof. There are two storeys, the windows have flush frames, some are mullioned, and some mullions have been removed.
232–240 Bradford Road; 53.78490°N 1.81832°W	—	c. 1815	A row of sandstone cottages in a terrace, with a sill band, block brackets to the eaves, and a stone slate roof. Nos. 238 and 240 are stepped slightly higher. There are two storeys, the doorways have plain surrounds, the windows have flush frames, some have single lights, and the others are mullioned.
1–7 Back Lane; 53.78480°N 1.81682°W	—	c. 1820	A row of sandstone cottages at right angles to Bradford Road with stepped stone slate roofs, hipped at the Bradford Road end. There are two storeys, the doorways have plain surrounds, and the windows have single lights or are mullioned with two lights.
154–158 Bradford Road and former Quarry Arms Public House; 53.78502°N 1.81489°W	—	c. 1820	A row of cottages and a former public house, they are in sandstone with block brackets to the eaves, and stone slate roofs with coped gables. There are two storeys, some windows have a single light, others are mullioned with two lights, and some mullions have been removed. The former public house has a gabled porch.
160–164 Bradford Road; 53.78506°N 1.81531°W	—	c. 1820	A row of sandstone cottages with a sill band, and stone slate roofs with coped gables. The doorways have flush frames, some windows are mullioned, and some mullions have been removed.
15–19 Green End; 53.78412°N 1.81925°W	—	c. 1820	A row of three sandstone cottages with stone slate roofs, two storeys, doorways with squared jambs, and mullioned windows, some of which have been altered. No. 15 projects slightly and has a sill band, and No. 19 has a built-out shop front.
21–39 Green End; 53.78383°N 1.81926°W	—	c. 1820	Two rows of terraced cottages, at an angle following the curve the road. They are in sandstone with stone slate roofs and two storeys. The doorways have squared jambs, some of the windows have single lights, some are mullioned, and some mullions have been removed. No. 21 has a shop front in the ground floor, and in the other row is a passageway.
160–168 Thornton Old Road; 53.79568°N 1.80412°W	—	c. 1820	A row of sandstone cottages, with dentilled brackets to the eaves and stone slate roofs. There are two storeys, the doorways have squared jambs, and the windows are mullioned.
176–182 Bradford Road; 53.78498°N 1.81644°W	—	c. 1820–30	A row of four sandstone cottages with a sill band, block brackets to the eaves, and stone slate roofs. There are two storeys, some windows have single lights, others are mullioned, and some mullions have been removed.
185 and 187 Thornton Old Road; 53.79534°N 1.80303°W	—	c. 1820–30	A pair of sandstone cottages with a stone slate roof. There are two storeys, the doorways have squared jambs, some windows have single lights, and the others are mullioned with three lights.
Green Head House and Barn; 53.77901°N 1.84710°W	—	1825	The farmhouse, which was extended in about 1840, and the barn to the right, are in sandstone with stone slate roofs. The house has saddlestones and prominent kneelers, a sill band, two storeys, a front of two bays, and the extension is recessed on the left. There is a doorway with squared jambs, the windows in the main range have been reglazed, and in the extension are two two-light mullioned windows, and a single-light window over the porch. The barn has a segmental archway with voussoirs, and four lunettes with keystones.
Thorntree Farmhouse and barn 53.78687°N 1.83543°W	—	Early 19th century	A farmhouse and barn in one range, they are in sandstone and have stone slate roofs with kneelers. There are two storeys, most of the windows are mullioned with two lights, there is a single-light window over the doorway, and in the west gable end is a Venetian window. The barn contains a segmental-arched entrance.
80–84 Clayton Lane; 53.77955°N 1.82690°W	—	c. 1830	A row of three stone cottages, with block brackets to the eaves, and stone slate roofs with sawn kneelers. There are two storeys, the doorways have squared jambs, some windows are mullioned with two lights, and the others have single lights.
173–179 Thornton Old Road; 53.79557°N 1.80289°W	—	c. 1830–40	A row of sandstone cottages, with a band and a stone slate roof. There are two storeys, the doorways have squared jambs, the windows in the upper floor have single lights, and in the ground floor are two-light mullioned windows.
Barn east of Crossley Hall; 53.79563°N 1.80338°W	—	Early to mid 19th century	The barn on the east side of the yard is in sandstone with a stone slate roof. The north gable end is splayed.
56–62 Baldwin Lane; 53.77850°N 1.82813°W	—	c. 1840	A row of four sandstone cottages with a sill band, dentilled eaves brackets, and a stone slate roof. The doorways have plain surrounds, in the upper floor are single-light windows, and the lower floor contains two-light mullioned windows.
St John's Church; 53.78385°N 1.82138°W		1849–50	The church is built in stone, and was designed by Mallinson and Healey in Decorated style. It consists of a nave with a clerestory, north and south aisles, north and south transepts, a chancel, and a west tower. The tower has clasping buttresses and an embattled parapet. The windows in the clerestory have trefoil head, and there are large windows at the west ends of the aisles.
Original blocks and chimney, Thornton View Hospital; 53.77650°N 1.81200°W		1858	Built as a workhouse and designed by Mallinson and Healey, it was later used as a hospital and then a school. The building is in sandstone with slate roofs. Highgate House is the main block, and has three storeys and a long front with a gabled centre and is flanked by towers with parapets. To the rear is a parallel two-storey range with 18 bays. Detached to the east is the entrance block with two storeys, three bays and lower wings. The middle bay projects, and contains an archway, and on the ridge is a cupola. To the northwest of the main blocks is a tapering octagonal chimney with a corniced crown.
Primary School; 53.78300°N 1.82042°W		1859	The school was designed by Mallinson and Healey in Decorated style and later extended. It is in stone on a plinth, with a sill band and a slate roof with coped gables. There is a single storey, and a symmetrical front, with a central range of four bays flanked by projecting gabled wings. In the angles are gabled porches containing doorways with pointed heads, and in the centre is a gabled buttress rising to a bellcote with a cross finial. The windows in the central range have three lights under a four-centred arch, and in the wings they have two lights under a pointed arch. To the right is the school house, and at the rear is a single-storey range.
39 and 41 Oakes Lane and stables 53.79852°N 1.81366°W		c. 1860–70	A house, Ellercroft, with adjoining stables at the roadside. They are in sandstone, and have slate roofs, and gables with bargeboards and pendant finials. The house has two storeys and attics, and it contains bay windows, some canted, and the others smaller and rectangular with cast iron cresting. The other windows have round heads, some with single lights, and the others with two lights and colonnettes. The trellised porch is in cast iron with cresting.
Upper Syke; 53.77908°N 1.82648°W	—	1862	A large house in gritstone on a moulded plinth, with quoins, and a Welsh slate roof with ornate iron finials. There are two storeys and attics, the southeast front has a recessed centre flanked by gabled wings, each containing a two-storey canted bay window with an iron balustrade. The northeast front has a porch with a four-centred arched doorway, a dentilled eaves cornice and a parapet with an ornate iron railing. Behind the porch is a staircase tower with a dentilled cornice and a balustrade, and to the right a cross-wing projects and contains a canted oriel window.
Village Hall; 53.78183°N 1.82044°W		c. 1870	Originally the mechanics' institute and later used for other purposes, the building is in sandstone, with rusticated quoin pilasters, an impost band, a moulded sill band, a moulded eaves cornice and a parapet with sections of balustrading and spiked ball finials. There are two storeys and five bays, the middle bay projecting under a pediment. The central doorway has pilasters, and the doorway and the window above it each has a pulvinated frieze and a moulded cornice.
Ceramic House; 53.77683°N 1.83711°W		c. 1880–90	The lodge to The Towers, with the front decorated to advertise the products of Clayton Fireclay Works. It is built in red glazed fireclay bricks, with enamel motifs in white and blue brick in the upper floor, and the roof is tiled. There are two storeys and four bays, the left two bays recessed. On the front are decorated bands between the floors and in the eaves. The windows are sashes with decorated lintels and circular decorated plaques at the upper corners. There are similar plaques on the doorway, which has a fanlight. In front of the lodge is an elaborate cast iron balustrade.
The Towers; 53.77781°N 1.83731°W		c. 1880–90	The house is built in red glazed fireclay bricks, with a decorated band and frieze, and a balustraded parapet with embattled turrets on the corners and at two mid-points. There are two storeys, a rectangular plan, and sides of three and four bays. The windows and doorways have decorated lintels and circular decorated plaques at the upper corners.
Glenholme; 53.77953°N 1.81502°W		1886	A large stone house on a chamfered plinth, with a double band, and a slate roof. There are two storeys and attics, and a single-storey billiard room to the left. The central doorway has a fanlight, and to the right is a two-storey canted bay window. The east front has a conservatory to the left, and a two-storey canted bay window with a gable. In the north front are two two-storey rounded bay windows surmounted by a gable. The windows are a mix; most are casement cross windows, some are sashes, and there is a two-light mullioned window.
Chimney stack, Clayton Fireclay Works; 53.77756°N 1.83818°W		c. 1890	The chimney of the former works is in dark red brick, it is tall and tapering, and has a square section. On the chimney are three bands of enamelled bricks with white and green brick diamond pattern panels, the top band also with urns. At the top of the chimney is a white and blue block frieze under a cornice cap.
St Saviour's Church; 53.79846°N 1.79913°W		1966	The church was designed by George Pace, and the church hall was added to the west in 1971. The church has a frame of steel and shuttered concrete, walls of dark red brick, and slate roofs. The plan is of a broad rectangle, with vestries to the northwest, a chapel to the west, a bell tower to the east, and a porch and a transept on the north side. The windows are rectangular and of varying sizes. On the bell tower is a large Latin cross with doubled arms, and below is the name of the church, both in grey metal. To the right of the cross is a louvred opening with a segmental head.
