= Bradford College =

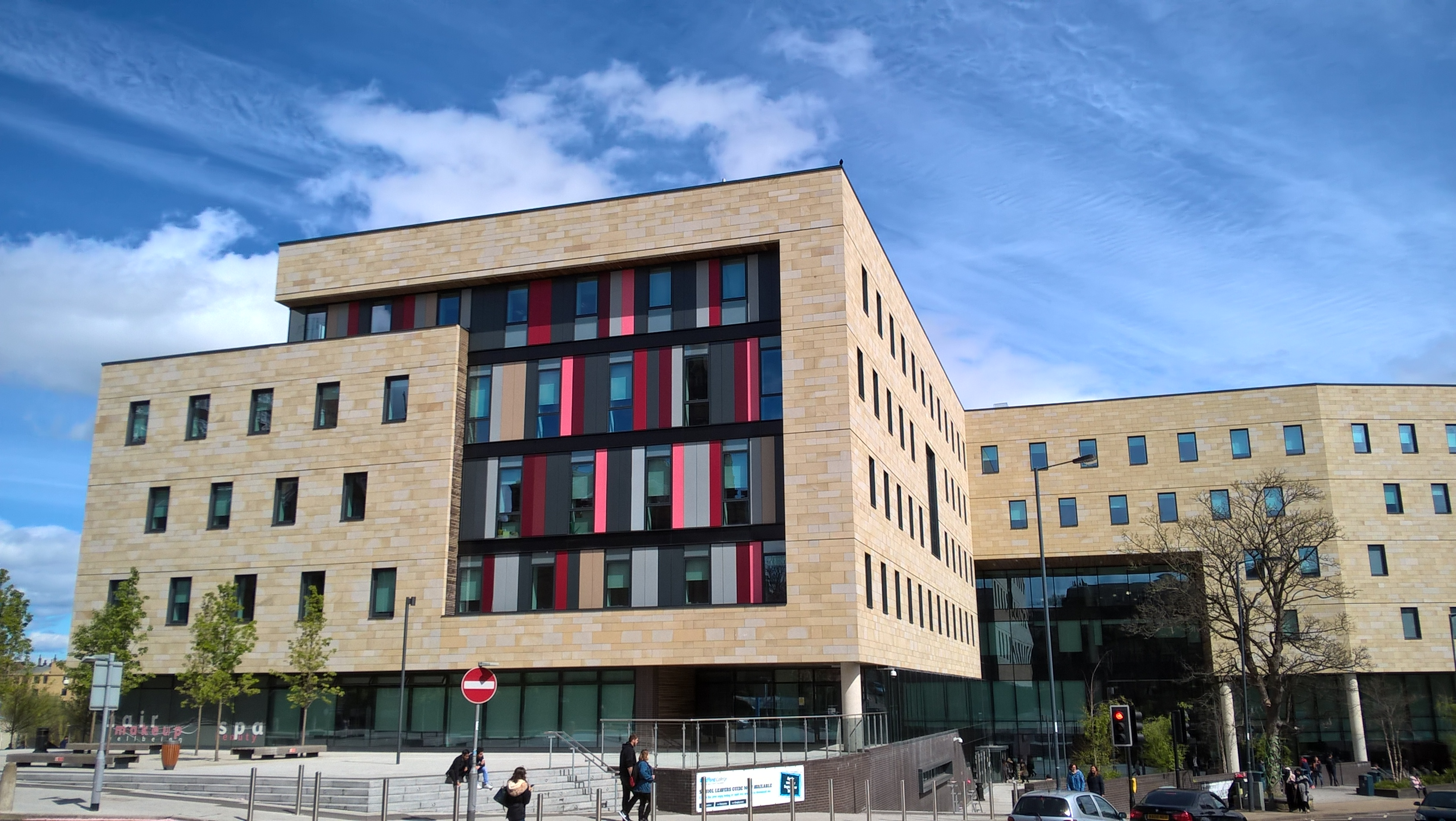
- David Hockney Building, main campus

Location
- Bradford, West Yorkshire, BD7 1AY; England; 53.7912°N 1.7614°W

Information
- Former names: Bradford Technical School, Bradford and Ilkley Community College
- Type: Further and higher education college
- Established: 1832; 194 years ago as Bradford Technical School
- Department for Education URN: 130532 Tables
- Ofsted: Reports
- Principal: Chris Webb
- Gender: mixed
- Age: 14+
- Enrollment: c.25,000
- Colour: Green (formerly blue)
- Affiliations: University of Bolton, Teesside University, Leeds Beckett University, University of Bradford (formerly)
- Website: www.bradfordcollege.ac.uk

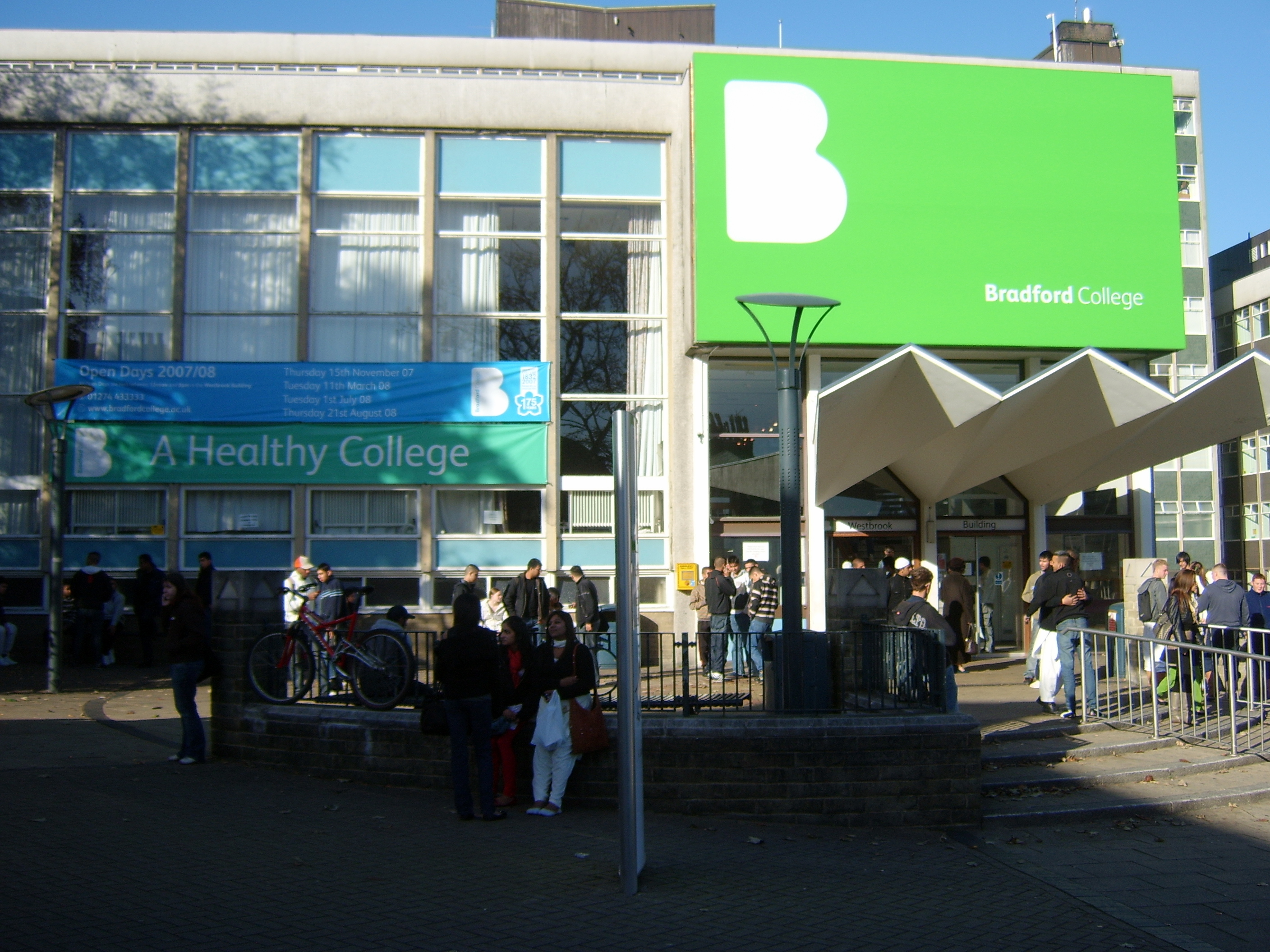
The Westbrook Building at Bradford College in November 2007. This entrance was demolished in 2012.

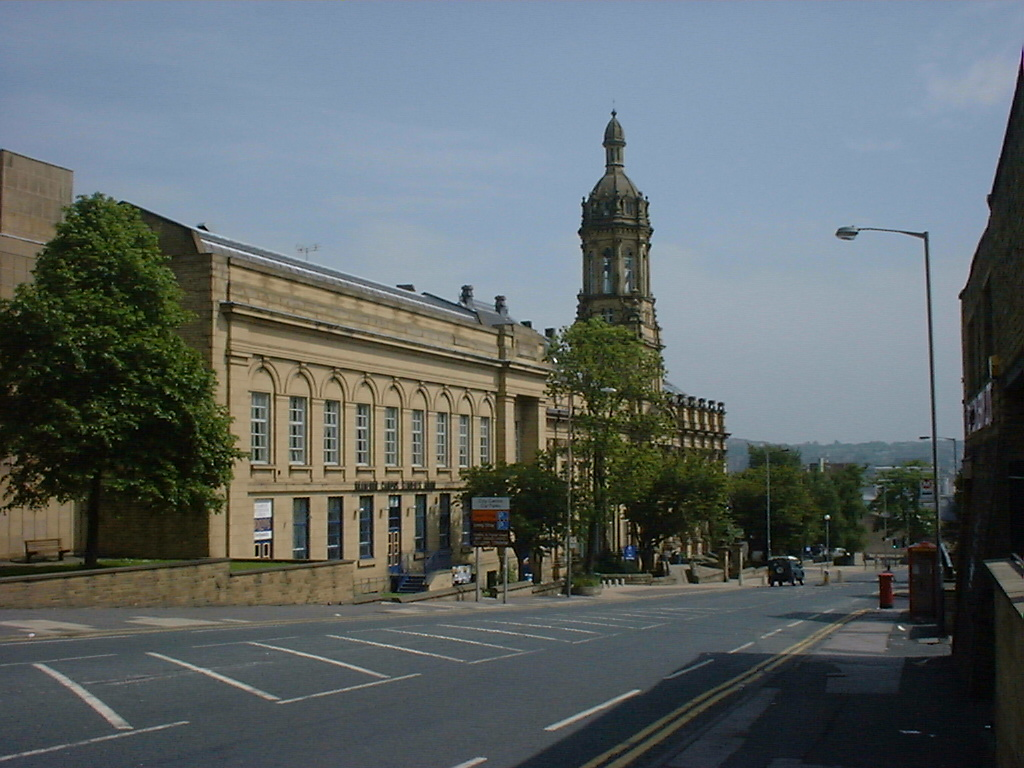
The Old Building at Bradford College

Bradford College is a further and higher education college in Bradford, West Yorkshire, England, with approximately 25,000 students. The college offers a range of full and part-time courses from introductory level through to postgraduate level and caters for a variety of students, including school leavers, adults wanting to return to education, degree-level students and those seeking professional qualifications.

== HE provision ==
Bradford College is one of the FE Colleges with the largest HE provision in England, with approximately 170 full and part-time HE courses.

The College's HE provision is currently validated by University of Bolton, having previously been validated by Teesside University.

The move to Teesside University was a result of Leeds Metropolitan University's withdrawal from its partnerships with colleges except for foundation degrees.

== History ==
In 1832, the Bradford Mechanics Institute was founded. In 1863, the institute had grown to accommodate full-time staff and had its own School of Industrial Design and Art. In 1872 the Bradford MP William Edward Forster opened new buildings in Bridge Street.

On 23 June 1882, the then Prince and Princess of Wales (later King Edward VII and Queen Alexandra) came to open the new School. They were given a very warm welcome: "From Saltaire Station to the Technical School, a distance of four miles, was one continuous avenue of Venetian masts, streamers, and many coloured banners, while at appropriate points triumphal arches of great magnificence were erected."

In 1982, the institution was named Bradford and Ilkley Community College, after a merger with Ilkley College, giving the combined college a small satellite campus in the nearby town of Ilkley, north-east of Bradford. This was closed in 1999 and soon after the institution became Bradford College.

In 2002, a merger between the college and the University of Bradford was proposed; this was pursued until the summer of 2003, when the two institutions issued a joint statement calling off the merger. Beginning in 2006 the college underwent a re-brand and unveiled its current logo. A community learning centre, named The Three Valleys Centre, was opened in nearby Keighley in 2007 which hosts a hairdressing and beauty salon (also operating on a commercial basis), as well as I.T and a range of language courses.

As part of the college's 175-year celebration, it published a list of 175 famous alumni of the college. This list includes ex-students such as Edward Appleton, Tasmin Archer, David Berglas, Alex Corina, Bob Hardy, David Hockney and Joyce Gould.

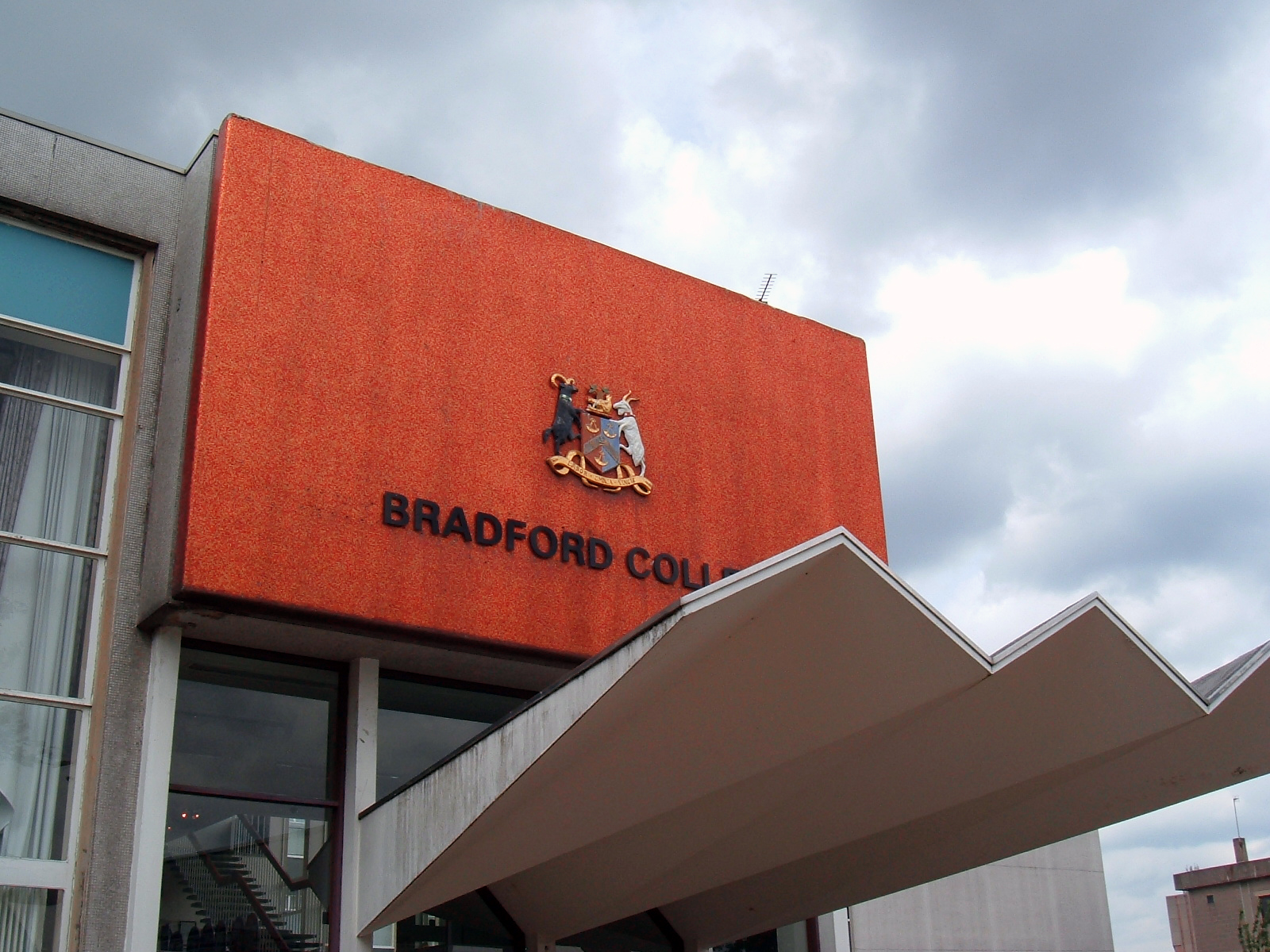
Bradford College in June 2006

Trinity Green, which houses a new sports centre and teaching facilities for construction and engineering students, opened in September 2008, housed in a new purpose-built building on the site of MacMillan Halls of Residence which were demolished in 2007. A second phase of building replaced the Westbrook and Randall Well buildings with a more modern structure. Government funding was put on hold for this project in March 2009 and was not expected to be available again until 2011. The new building, named the David Hockney Building after one its most famous alumni, opened in September 2014 after two years of construction. A new Advanced Technology Centre was scheduled to open in September 2015 on a nearby former car park.

The College received the go-ahead by the Skills Funding Agency for a £50 million building. The project is the second phase of the College's Accommodation Strategy started with the opening of the Trinity Green Campus:

Bradford College's Appleton Building was named after the Bradford scientist Edward Victor Appleton, and the College's Lister Building was named after Samuel Lister.

== Quality assurance ==
As an institution in receipt of government funding Bradford College is regularly inspected by Ofsted and the QAA. The last reports from 2008 (Ofsted) and 2010 (QAA) confirmed the high quality of the provision and identified a number of good practices across the institution.

Ofsted inspection in 2017 gave the college a 'Requires Improvement' grading in most areas. The Initial Teacher Education inspected by Ofsted in 2010 also resulted in good and outstanding grades.

The latest Ofsted inspection was done on 9 November 2021 and found that the College was Good.

== Campuses ==
The main campus is situated on Great Horton Road close to Bradford city centre. However, some courses are delivered elsewhere. The Academy is located in the Three Valleys Centre in Keighley. There are several other campuses in Bradford, such as Bolton Royd on Manningham Lane or Appleton Academy in Wyke. Part-time leisure, community and some of the ESOL courses are offered in over 20 different locations across Bradford.

== Bradford College Education Trust ==
Bradford College is the sponsor of three secondary schools as part of the Bradford College Education Trust. the three schools are Appleton Academy, Bradford Studio School and Samuel Lister Academy.

== Student Life ==
=== Students' Union ===
Bradford college have a Students' union that is part of the National union of students

Bradford College Students' Union represents and supports 25,000 students

=== Vision, Mission and Ethos ===
Vision	To be the most valued provider in the region of enrichment and personal development programs and services
Mission	To Transform lives by promising to provide unrivaled development and support services
Ethos	Always aligning with the humanistic approach putting our scholars at the center of everything we do - Creative, Challenging, Empowering

=== History ===
Bradford College Students' Union was formed in 1901 by students and was founded permanently in 1903.

in 1957 Bradford college Students' Union and what would become University of Bradford Students' Union split. But they shared the first 60 years of there history.

=== Lead officers of the Union ===
1st Officer is the president

2nd Office is the Education and Welfare Vice or Deputy President

3rd Officer is the Secretary, Facilities or F.E. officer.

4th Officer is the Treasure, H.E. officer or another Deputy President

Officers by year
Year	1st Officer	2nd Officer	3rd Officer	4th Officer
2026				
2025	Maqadas Bashir	Maryum Ishtiaq	Muhammad Saad	Shazia Ditta
2024	Maqadas Bashir	Salah Uddin	Adam Faizal	Mohammed Awais
2023	Taqi Ali	Wafa Ahmed	Adam Faizal	Noman Farooq
2022	Taqi Ali	Aishah Khatun		
2021	Habiba Shiraz	Michael Steele	Jevgenija Mironova	Zaynab Rauf Gerard Segovia
2020	Marvina Newton	Michael Steele	Sura Al-Ani	Suliman Rashad Amy Alinson
2019				
2018				
2017	Waseem Siddique	Ismaha Farooq	Sohaib Ashraf	Matt Peel
2016	Muzzamil Khan	Mazn Amhamed		
2015	Muzzamil Khan	Mazn Amhamed		
2014	Fatima Sohail	Umar Rafique		
2013	Piers Telemacque	Umar Rafique		
2012	Nabeel Hussain	Mobeen Hussain		
2011	Nabeel Hussain	Mobeen Hussain		
2010	Nabeel Hussain	Mohammed Munawar		
2009	Soheib Shabir	Mohammed Munawar		
2008	Usman Amir	Sanaa Iqbal Sidrah Yasmin		
2007	Sanaa Iqbal	Sadiya Ahmed		
2006		Sadiya Ahmed		
1995	Emma Smith			
1994	Emma Smith			
1991	Gloria de Piero			
1981	Tony Tudor	Terry Rooney		
1976	Bob Darbourne	Jackie Malone	Graham Law	Dave Burke
1953		Peter Bell		
1903	Mr. Charnock	Mr. J.H. Hartley		
1901	Mr. W. Bailey			

== Notable people ==
=== Alumni ===
- Tasmin Archer, singer-songwriter
- Alex Corina, artist and community activist
- Gloria de Piero, Labour MP for Ashfield
- Stanley Ellis, linguist
- Sir Edmund Elton, 8th Baronet, ceramics artist and inventor
- Richard Eurich, artist and landscape painter
- Graham Fransella, painter
- Andy Goldsworthy, artist
- David Hockney, artist
- Yvonne McGregor, racing cyclist
- Mick Manning, illustrator and children's author
- Donald Rooum, cartoonist
- Paul Sample, cartoonist
- Robert E. Swindells, author

=== Lecturers ===
- Kim Leadbeater, Labour Co-op politician
- Alice Mahon, trade unionist and Labour Party politician

=== Unclear ===
- Trevor Bell, artist
- Major General Dudley Graham Johnson (13 February 1884 – 21 December 1975), British Army officer and recipient of the Victoria Cross

== See also ==
- Listed buildings in Bradford (City Ward)
- List of UCAS institutions
- List of universities in the United Kingdom
