= Clayton A.R.L.F.C. =

English rugby team

(England) Clayton A.R.L.F.C.
- Full name: Clayton Rugby League Football Club
- Location: Clayton, Bradford, West Yorkshire, England

Clayton Rugby League Football Club is an amateur rugby league club in Clayton, West Yorkshire, currently competing in the Pennine League. Clayton play at Lidget Green Cricket Club's ground in a home kit of striped burgundy and amber; their away kit is blue. The club has several teams including those for under-16s.

== History ==
=== 1947 to December 1950 ===
In 1947, the Bradford Amateur Rugby League placed an advert in the Telegraph and Argus announcing a meeting to be held in the evening at the Central Hall, Clayton, with a view to starting an amateur rugby league club in Clayton. From this meeting the club was eventually formed.

To raise cash to start the club selected people were offered a Vice Presidency in return for a donation of ten pounds. The first approach was to Mr Charles Vosper, who agreed. The next approach was to John Hainsworth, a local joiner, who also agreed. The last approach was to Mr Harry Shepherd, the local builder, who agreed but said he would give six scaffold poles for the goal posts instead of ten pounds. A loan of thirty pounds from the founder of the club, Gordon Wright, set the club on its way.

An approach was made to Bradford City Corporation Parks Committee to see if the Delph Recreation ground was available. The reply was “no”.

An approach was then made to Mr Metcalfe, farmer, Town End, to see if his paddock, which was below and next to the Delph recreation ground, was available. He advised that the Seed brothers, maltsters, owned the paddock. Mr Michael Seed subsequently approved and offered financial support. Both were withdrawn when Mr Seed learned the club was going to be called “The Clayton Amateur Rugby League Club”. Having been an amateur rugby player himself, he said he could not be associated with the professional code.

Next approach was to the Parks Committee to ask if the field in Green End opposite the Baptist graveyard could be used; permission was refused.

Mr George Rhodes who lived in Bradford Road owned a paddock just below the Broadfolds Allotments and he offered free use of the paddock. The paddock was anything but level but the offer was accepted.

The original jerseys had horizontal orange and black stripes and so the team was named “The Clayton Tigers”.

The Amateur Rugby League Secretary was informed of progress and lack of sufficient numbers to make a team. Prospective players in surrounding areas were advised and eventually the necessary numbers were enlisted. Quite a few came from the North Bierley area.

The original team members from Clayton were: Eric Holland (captain), Peter Holland, Bruce Nottage, Bobby Barker, Arthur Hainsworth, and Gordon Wright. All other players were not from Clayton. Eric Holland resigned and was replaced as captain by Ernest Pearson.

Mr Jack Bolton who lived in Aberdeen Terrace was an ex-league player; having played for the Huddersfield Professional League Team. He accepted the job of team coach.

Bradford Education Department arranged for an instructor-run PT sessions on Friday nights at the local Board School.

Mr Adamson, caretaker at the Board School, offered the use of the students cloak room and both teams changed there. Referees used a private house.

A 'B team' was organized with an all black strip.

Insurance cover was arranged at the cost of 2/6d per player. First player to receive an injury was Jack Haigh, who lived in Lime Cottage, Clayton Lane. In an away game on a very hard ground Jack was tackled and broke his jaw.

Some time later the Parks Committee offered the use of the recreation ground at the top of Beaconsfield Road. It was at this time a man called Jack Smith joined the club. He was a 100 yards sprint champion and no opposition player could catch him.

Mr Willie Watson, Reva Syke Road, Clayton, took on the position of club president. Gordon Wright continued as treasurer. A Mr Crowther became club secretary.

Mr Jack Wilman, landlord of the Albion Hotel, offered the use of the pub's front lounge for club meetings, and from that point onwards all club meetings were held there.

Frank Sugden, who lived in Aberdeen Terrace, Clayton, played rugby union for the Otley Club. He agreed to play for the CARLC

Some others who played in the team during this time were: Jack Haigh, Tony Haigh, Harry Dalby, Derek Greenwood, Crowther

Some time later, outside this time period the team won the Bradford ARL championship. Ernest Pearson was captain of the winning team.

=== CLAYTON 1980s to 2000s. ===
Clayton RLFCs more recent success was mainly gained in the period between the mid-1980s and 2000, prior to the move from the Delph, Clayton Prior to the adventurous and forward thinking move, Clayton continued to play on 'The Delph', Clayton until the 2000/2001 season ending their time there with an excellent win v Elland to reach the semi-finals of the Pennine Presidents Cup.

In the late 1980s and early 1990s Clayton had much success on the Delph with coach Glen Marriot bringing together a tightly knit group of players mainly from Clayton, but other notable players from the Queensbury and West Bowling areas of Bradford. Success came, seeing Clayton as one of the region's best clubs.

Under the guidance of stalwarts Tommy McCarthy, Dave Atkinson and Keith Bateman, Marriot brought together a group of Clayton products such as the Flannagan brothers, Ian, Kevin and Steven, Robert 'Bob" Keeble, Mark Anderson I,

Alan Dodsley, Richard Tempest-Mitchell, The Hobson twins who were supplemented by the likes of Martin Potts

Timmy Southgate, Neil Marriott, Dean Raistrick and many more. Several professionals came through the ranks such as Andy and Phil Stevenson, Scotts Pendlebury, and later Steve Crossley.

Due to the contributions from MacCarthey and Bateman in the mid-1970s, the squad had many young players to call on who brought all their skills and experience together in a golden era that paved the way for a subsequent future at Lidget Green.

The squad reached numerous finals and semi-finals, including topping the Pennine Premier on multiple occasions.The club also produced talents who reached county and national squads, such as Scott Pendlebury, Paul Cornforth and Craig Pickthall along with other successes in Dave Todd, Chris Parr, Darren Swales and Darren Collins. Many more have followed.

=== CLAYTON 2000 to 2018 ===
Once the move to Lidget Green Cricket Club, Clayton were guided by Dave & Carole Pickthall, Tommy McCarthy, Paul Gill, stalwart Scott Pendlebury many more. The move brought about by a need for a club house, a fenced off pitch and better facilities generally, to allow the club to move up the ranks in the national conference league. This, a controversial but necessary move for many, the 'Villagers', moved 2 km down the Clayton Road, to nearby Lidget Green in order to take the club forward. In more recent years the move has proven to an excellent development for rugby league not only in west Bradford, but also for the city of Bradford and the Pennine League.
