= Prisoners' Wives =

British television series

- Genre: Drama
- Created by: Julie Gearey
- Written by: Julie Gearey; James Graham; Chloe Moss
- Starring: Polly Walker; Pippa Haywood; Sally Carman; Karla Crome; Emma Rigby; Natalie Gavin
- Composer: Daniel Pemberton
- Country of origin: United Kingdom
- Original language: English
- No. of series: 2
- No. of episodes: 10

Production
- Executive producers: Roanna Benn; Rebecca de Souza; Julie Gearey
- Producer: Anna Ferguson
- Production locations: Sheffield, South Yorkshire, England
- Running time: 60 minutes
- Production company: Tiger Aspect Productions

Original release
- Network: BBC One
- Release: 31 January 2012 – 4 April 2013

Prisoners' Wives is a BBC drama series, created and written by Julie Gearey and starring Polly Walker, Pippa Haywood, Emma Rigby, Natalie Gavin, Sally Carman and Karla Crome, with supporting cast including Iain Glen, Adam Gillen, Jonas Armstrong, Reuben Johnson, Enzo Cilenti and Owen Roe. The series centres on four very different women, each struggling to cope with a significant man in her life serving time in prison. The series is set in Sheffield, South Yorkshire. Series 1 was six episodes long, and premiered on Tuesday 31 January 2012. Series 2 was a shorter run of four episodes, and began on Thursday 14 March 2013 on BBC One.

== Main cast ==
=== Series 1 ===
- Emma Rigby as Gemma Roscoe
- Polly Walker as Francesca Miller
- Pippa Haywood as Harriet Allison
- Natalie Gavin as Lou Bell

=== Series 2 ===
- Polly Walker as Francesca Miller
- Pippa Haywood as Harriet Allison
- Sally Carman as Kim Haines
- Karla Crome as Aisling O'Connor

== Supporting cast ==
=== Series 1 ===
- Jonas Armstrong as Steve Roscoe
- Iain Glen as Paul Miller
- Adam Gillen as Gavin Allison
- Reuben Johnson as Sean Lowe
- Andrew Tiernan as DS David Hunter
- David Bradley as Frank
- Harry McEntire as Matt Miller
- Phoebe Dynevor as Lauren Miller
- Adrian Rawlins as Ian, the Prison Chaplain

=== Series 2 ===
- Iain Glen as Paul Miller
- Adam Gillen as Gavin Allison
- Enzo Cilenti as Mick Haines
- Owen Roe as Brendan O'Connor
- Nicola Walker as DCI Jo Fontaine
- David Bradley as Frank
- Harry McEntire as Matt Miller
- Phoebe Dynevor as Lauren Miller
- Anne Reid as Margaret
- Adrian Rawlins as Ian, the Prison Chaplain

== Episodes ==
=== Series 1 (2012) ===
No.	Title	Directed by	Written by	Original release date	UK viewers (millions)
1	"Episode 1"	Damon Thomas	Julie Gearey	31 January 2012	5.62
2	"Episode 2"	Damon Thomas	Julie Gearey	7 February 2012	5.96
3	"Episode 3"	Damon Thomas	James Graham	14 February 2012	5.18
4	"Episode 4"	Harry Bradbeer	Chloe Moss	21 February 2012	4.69
5	"Episode 5"	Harry Bradbeer	Julie Gearey	28 February 2012	4.98
6	"Episode 6"	Harry Bradbeer	Julie Gearey	6 March 2012	5.16

=== Series 2 (2013) ===
No.	Title	Directed by	Written by	Original release date	UK viewers (millions)
7	"Episode 1"	Harry Bradbeer	Julie Gearey	14 March 2013	4.94
8	"Episode 2"	Harry Bradbeer	Julie Gearey	21 March 2013	4.96
9	"Episode 3"	Harry Bradbeer	Julie Gearey	28 March 2013	4.74
10	"Episode 4"	Harry Bradbeer	Julie Gearey	4 April 2013	4.79

== Production ==
Prisoners’ Wives is executive produced for Tiger Aspect by Roanna Benn, Rebecca de Souza and Greg Brenman (Tiger's Head of Drama) and for the BBC by Christopher Aird. Damon Thomas and Harry Bradbeer direct with Anna Ferguson as producer and Abi Bach as co-producer. The series was commissioned for BBC One by Ben Stephenson and Danny Cohen for airing in early 2012.

== Ratings ==
The first series attracted an average consolidated audience of 5.26 million. The average consolidated audience for the second series was 4.86 million.
