= The Arbor (film) =

2010 British film

- British release poster
- Directed by: Clio Barnard
- Produced by: Tracy O'Riordan
- Starring: Christine Bottomley; Robert Emms; Natalie Gavin; Jimi Mistry; Kathryn Pogson; Kate Rutter; Manjinder Virk; Danny Webb
- Cinematography: Ole Birkeland
- Edited by: Harry Escott; Molly Nyman
- Music by: Nick Fenton; Daniel Goddard
- Production companies: Artangel; UK Film Council
- Distributed by: Verve Pictures
- Release dates: April 25, 2010 (Tribeca); October 22, 2010 (United Kingdom)
- Running time: 94 minutes
- Country: United Kingdom
- Language: English
- Box office: $126,182

The Arbor is a 2010 British film about Andrea Dunbar, directed by Clio Barnard. The film uses actors lip-synching to interviews with Dunbar and her family, and concentrates on the strained relationship between Dunbar and her daughter Lorraine.

== Cast ==
- Christine Bottomley as Lisa Thompson
- Robert Emms as Young David
- Natalie Gavin as The Girl
- Jimi Mistry as Yousaf
- Kathryn Pogson as Pamela Dunbar
- Kate Rutter as The Mother
- Manjinder Virk as Lorraine Dunbar
- Danny Webb as Max Stafford-Clark / The Father

== Production ==
The film was shot in and around Brafferton Arbor, a street on the Buttershaw Estate in Bradford, West Yorkshire, where Andrea Dunbar lived and worked.

The film was inspired by so-called verbatim theatre, with audio recordings of Lorraine Dunbar and other family members, lip-synched by professional actors in set-designed environments. Barnard had used a similar technique for her 1998 short film Random Acts of Intimacy. The film also includes scenes from Dunbar’s autobiographical play The Arbor performed outdoors by a mix of actors and estate residents, the 1986 film Rita, Sue and Bob Too written by Dunbar, Robin Soans' 2000 play A State Affair, as well as archive footage.

Barnard's original intention for this film was not to make it about Andrea Dunbar, but after speaking with her eldest daughter, Lorraine, that is what emerged. The film was intended to be about the changes that had come to the Brafferton Arbor.

== Reception ==
On review aggregator Rotten Tomatoes, the film holds an approval rating of 96% based on 46 reviews. The website's critical consensus reads, "Smart and inventive, The Arbor offers some intensely memorable twists on tired documentary tropes." Metacritic, which uses a weighted average, assigned the film a score of 88 out of 100, based on 10 critics, indicating "universal acclaim".

=== Accolades ===
- 2010: Nominated, BAFTA Award for Outstanding Debut by a British Director
- 2010: Winner, Sutherland Trophy at the BFI London Film Festival
- 2010: Winner, Sheffield Innovation Award at the Sheffield Doc/Fest
- 2010: Winner, British Independent Film Award, The Douglas Hickox Award
- 2011: Winner, Best New Documentary Filmmaker, Tribeca Film Festival
