= Thornton View Hospital =

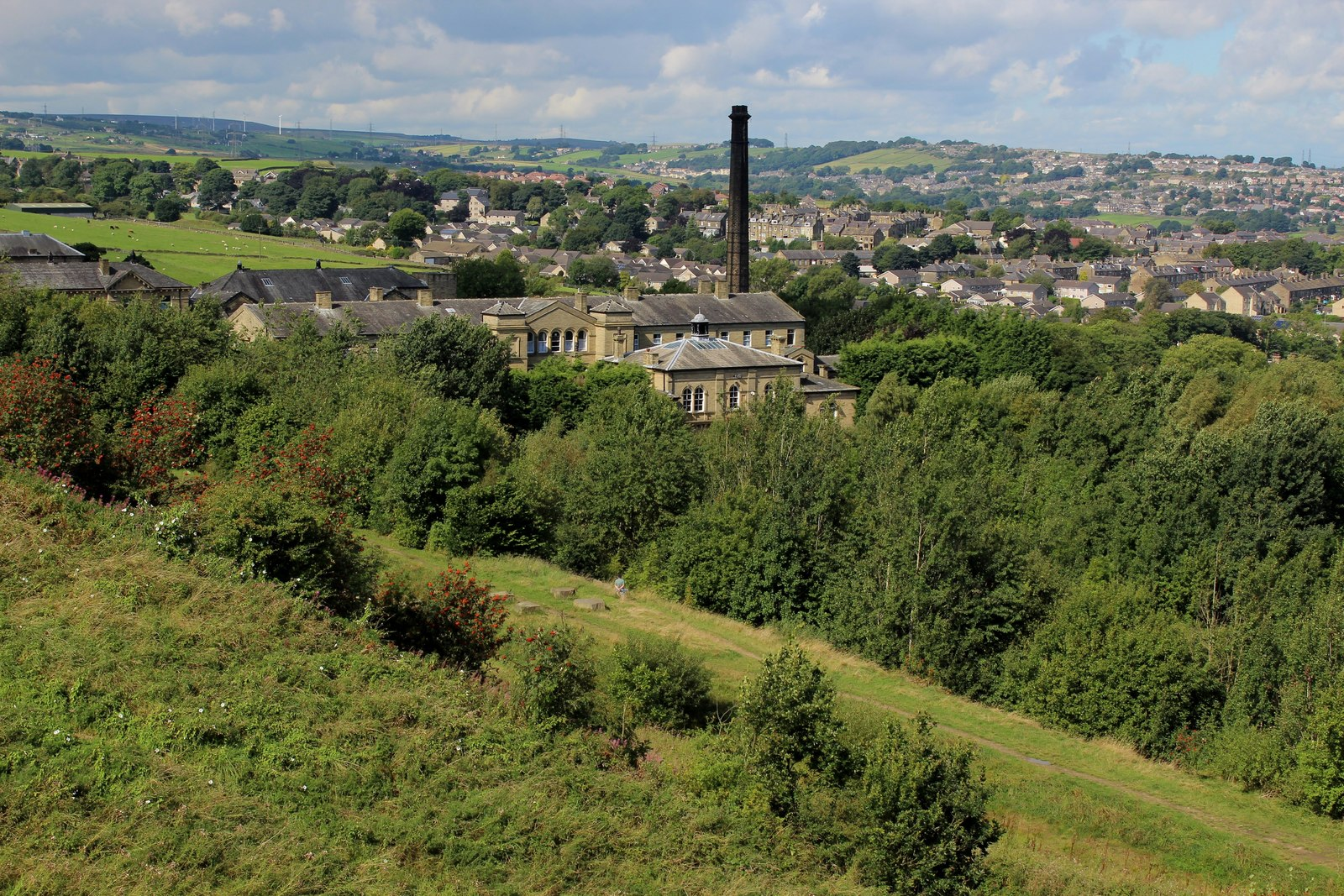
- Thornton View Hospital

- Shown in West Yorkshire

Geography
- Location: Clayton, West Yorkshire, England, United Kingdom
- Coordinates: 53°46′35″N 1°48′44″W

Organisation
- Care system: Public NHS
- Type: Specialist

Services
- Speciality: Geriatric

History
- Founded: 1858
- Closed: 1985

Links
- Lists: Hospitals in England

Thornton View hospital was an 82-bed geriatric hospital near Clayton, West Yorkshire, on the site of the North Bierley Union workhouse.

== History ==
The hospital has its origins in the North Bierly Union Workhouse which opened in 1858. The workhouse established its own infirmary from an early stage but benefited from a dedicated male infirmary block from 1872. The hospital joined the National Health Service in 1948.

The hospital was slated for closure in 1983 to cut expenditure, which led to bitter resentment by the residents of the city of Bradford. The hospital had 82 beds with 70 patients and housed primarily long term elderly patients with no living family members. The impending closure threatened to distribute the long term patients to similar facilities nearby. The closure was discussed in Parliament in January 1983 and again in June 1984.

The hospital was occupied by staff led by Alex Corina who resisted closure from August 1983 until April 1985, in an effort to get the facility re-designated as a geriatric hospital. A petition was circulated which resulted in 30,000 signatures and the support of local area residents, the Bradford Community Health Council and Bradford City Council as well as the families of the hospital patients. After the hospital closed, the buildings were converted for academic use by a girls' boarding school in 1992.
