= Ali & Ava =

2021 British drama film

- Theatrical release poster
- Directed by: Clio Barnard
- Written by: Clio Barnard
- Produced by: Tracy O'Riordan
- Starring: Adeel Akhtar; Claire Rushbrook
- Cinematography: Ole Bratt Birkeland
- Edited by: Maya Maffioli
- Music by: Harry Escott
- Production companies: BBC Film; British Film Institute; Screen Yorkshire; Moonspun Films; Altitude Film Entertainment; UK Global Screen Fund
- Distributed by: Altitude (UK)
- Release dates: 11 July 2021 (Cannes); 4 March 2022 (UK)
- Running time: 95 minutes
- Country: United Kingdom
- Language: English
- Box office: $887,785

Ali & Ava is a 2021 British drama film written and directed by Clio Barnard. The film stars Adeel Akhtar and Claire Rushbrook in the lead roles. It had its world premiere at the 74th Cannes Film Festival in the Directors Fortnight section on 11 July 2021 and was released in the United Kingdom on 4 March 2022.

== Synopsis ==
The film is set in Bradford, on the working-class, predominantly white housing estate of Holme Wood, noted in both reality around 2016 and in the film for racist anti-social behaviour towards taxi drivers.

Ali, a man of Pakistani descent, lives with his soon-to-be ex-wife, Runa, who still mourns the loss of their unborn child. Ava lives in Holme Wood near her adult children, some of whom have children of their own.

Ali and Ava meet one day at the school where Ava works when Ali drops off his tenant's daughter. A friendship, built on a mutual love of music, gradually develops between the two, and deepens into something more as the couple struggles to overcome their respective familial entanglements and prejudices.

== Cast ==
- Adeel Akhtar as Ali
- Claire Rushbrook as Ava
- Ellora Torchia as Ali's separated wife, Runa
- Shaun Thomas as Ava's son, Callum
- Natalie Gavin as Dawn
- Mona Goodwin as Ava's daughter, Michelle
- Kamal Kaan as Ashraf
- Sienna Afsar as Ali's niece
- Siraj Hussain as Hashim

== Production ==
In January 2020, it was announced that Adeel Akhtar and Claire Rushbrook had joined the cast of the film, with Clio Barnard directing from a screenplay she wrote. BBC Film would produce, and Altitude Film Distribution was set to distribute in the United Kingdom.

== Release ==
The film had its world premiere at the 74th Cannes Film Festival in the Directors Fortnight section on 11 July 2021. It was theatrically released in the United Kingdom on 4 March 2022 and came out on VOD on 23 August 2022.

== Reception ==
=== Box office ===
Ali & Ava grossed $44,072 in the United States and Canada and $843,713 in other territories, for a worldwide total of $887,785.

=== Critical response ===
On review aggregator Rotten Tomatoes, the film holds an approval rating of 94% based on 88 reviews, with an average rating of 7.6/10. The website's critical consensus reads, "Ali & Ava's tender, naturalistic love story adds another powerful chapter to writer–director Clio Barnard's filmography." On Metacritic, the film holds a weighted average score of 75 out of 100 based on 19 critics, indicating "generally favorable reviews".
