= Reuben Johnson =

English actor and writer

Reuben Johnson is an English actor and writer. He is known for portraying Sean in the BBC series Prisoners' Wives, Wee Man in the feature film Weekender and Ashley in the feature film Territory, which he also wrote and directed. He grew up in Salford, Greater Manchester.

== Career ==
Johnson's theatre credits include Voxpop (Nabokov/Soho Theatre), Territory (Pleasance Theatre, UK Tour) and The Meeting (Pleasance Theatre, UK Tour). His film credits include Territory (Fiddy West Productions) and Weekender, (Momentum Pictures). He is soon to shoot British independent feature films 'Halcyon Heights' and 'Wrecked'. Television credits include Prisoners' Wives, Tiger Aspect/BBC, Casualty and Doctor Who

== Writing ==
Reuben Johnson was shortlisted for the Alfred Fagon Award in 2009 for his play Territory. Territory went on to win the National Student Drama Festival and Methuen Drama Award for Emerging Artists, Best Ensemble and Best Producer for Victoria Brittain. In 2010 Reuben Johnson returned to the Edinburgh Fringe Festival with his second play The Meeting and Territory running in rep. Territory was favorably reviewed and later transferred to the Lowry Studio Salford Quays. In 2011 Reuben was commissioned by Paines Plough to write a 15-minute response to Mike Bartlett's Love Love Love at the Royal Exchange, Manchester. This resulted in Johnson's third play The Proposal which opened as a full-length play at the Lowry Studio before transferring to Theatre503 in London. Johnson also developed a screenplay for a feature film of Territory which filmed in 2012 and was released on Vimeo On Demand on 8 October 2014. In 2012 Johnson was chosen to be part of The Big Room project with Paines Plough. His 4th play Wrecked was a co-production between Fiddy West Productions and the Lowry Studio. The play opened at the Edinburgh Festival 2012 before transferring to the Lowry Studio where it enjoyed a sell out run and Johnson received a nomination for Best Studio Performance from the Manchester Theatre Awards 2012 Johnson has recently written a series of comedy sketches alongside Victoria Brittain which are released weekly on Fiddy West Productions YouTube Channel, Fiddy Sketch.
