= Clayton, West Yorkshire =

Civil parish in West Yorkshire, England

Coordinates: 53.782000°N 1.813450°W

Clayton
- Location within West Yorkshire
- Population: 34,452 (2011 census)
- OS grid reference: SE123317
- Civil parish: Clayton
- Metropolitan borough: City of Bradford
- Metropolitan county: West Yorkshire
- Region: Yorkshire and the Humber
- Country: England
- Sovereign state: United Kingdom
- Post town: BRADFORD
- Postcode district: BD14
- Dialling code: 01274
- Police: West Yorkshire
- Fire: West Yorkshire
- Ambulance: Yorkshire
- UK Parliament: Bradford West
- Councillors: Sinead Engel (Lab); Carol Thirkill (Lab); Michelle Swallow (Lab Co-op)
- Website: www.clayton-village.co.uk

Clayton, or Clayton Village, is a civil parish in the City of Bradford metropolitan borough in West Yorkshire, England, situated 3 miles (4.8 km) to the west of Bradford city centre. It is listed in the Domesday Book, meaning that it dates back to at least the 11th century. It was privately owned from 1160 to 1866. It was noted for its clay. More recently, Clayton was a key location in the British and international wool trade, being the home of the British Wool Marketing Board headquarters. The old building was demolished and converted into housing in the late 1990s. The village re-acquired civil parish status with a parish council in 2004.

The main street of the village – Clayton Lane and pasture lane – which runs alongside the park, includes several traditional pubs, a popular crawl route for many residents. Starting at the top of the lane is the Fleece, moving down past the Royal Hotel to the Albion and the Black Bull – the oldest pub in the area.The Fiddlers Three and the Quarry Arms have now shut down. There are also several shops, churches and a golf club and reservoir at Clayton Heights (now designated as a Country Park) with views of the city of Bradford and the village of Thornton across the valley.

== History ==
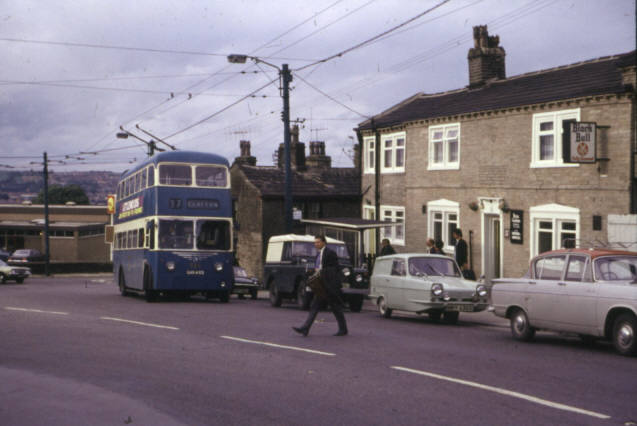
The Bradford Trolleybus and Black Bull pub at Clayton in 1972.

Evidence of presence of prehistoric people in Clayton was found in 1951 when a Neolithic stone axe was found in Thornlea Grove, the axe is now in the Cartwright Hall Museum. Clayton was established prior to the Norman Conquest in 1066 as it is listed in the Domesday Book in 1086 as the Manor Claitone when William the Conqueror granted it to Ilbert de Lacy. Claitone probably derives from claeg meaning clay and tun, meaning farmstead, and so meant farmstead on clay. The village was privately owned from 1160 to 1866, when a local board was formed to manage the village. During the 1870s "the wells", on the central village roundabout, was used as a site for open air preaching.

Clayton was a township in the ancient parish of Bradford. It became a separate civil parish in 1866. Under the Local Government Act 1894 the parish became Clayton Urban District. The civil parish and urban district were abolished in 1930, when Clayton was absorbed into the County Borough of Bradford. It became part of the City of Bradford Metropolitan District in 1974. The village re-acquired civil parish status with a parish council in 2004.

== Governance ==
Clayton, part of Clayton and Fairweather Green electoral ward, is situated within the City of Bradford Metropolitan District Council area having been incorporated into Bradford in 1930.

Civil parish

The village re-acquired civil parish status including a parish council in 2004 and the council designated the area an urban village in February 2007. The village was privately owned from 1160 to 1866 when a local board was formed to manage the village. The board managed Clayton's roads, sewers, lighting and refuse collection. The board also laid gas and water pipes in the village. In the Local Government Act 1894 the Board was replaced by Clayton District Council. The council created a crew of local fire fighters for the village until Clayton grew too large for these to be able to cope at which point Bradford Corporation was paid to cover the village with their fire brigade and ambulance service.

Clayton Parish Council was formed in 2004 following the approval of the Bradford (Parishes) Order 2004 and is a tier of local government below the level of district, borough or unitary council.

Specifically, Clayton Parish Council:

- deals with issues and matters raised by local residents;
- works closely with (and lobbies where necessary) Bradford Metropolitan Council on matters relating to the Parish to ensure the effective delivery of services and response to concerns of the local community;
- comments on local planning applications;
- manages Clayton's allotment belt, Glenholme allotments;
- provides grant aid opportunities for local community organisations through a Grant Aid allocation scheme.

Clayton Parish Council is governed by 13 Councillors led by a chairman and supported by a vice-chairman. Elections for the office of chairman and vice-chairman take place each year in May. The present chairman is Cllr Ruthie Houldsworth.

City Council

Clayton and Fairweather Green electoral ward is represented on Bradford Metropolitan District Council by three Labour Party councillors, Sinead Engel, Carol Thirkill and Michelle Swallow.

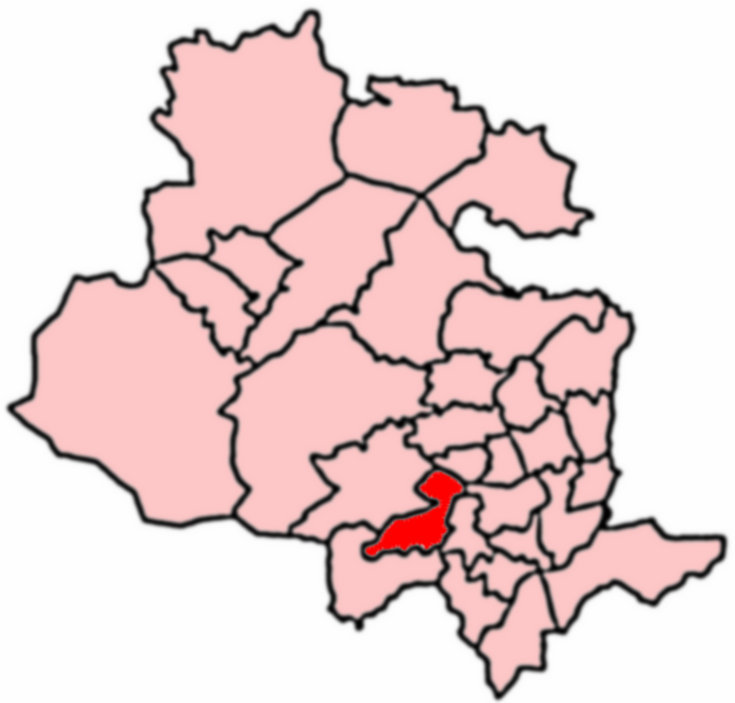
2004 Boundaries of Clayton and Fairweather Ward.

| Election | Councillor | Councillor | Councillor |
|---|---|---|---|
| 2004 | David John Servant (Con) | Charles Malcolm Sykes (Con) | Elaine Byrom (Con) |
| 2006 | David Servant (Con) | Charles Sykes (Con) | Elaine Byrom (Con) |
| 2007 | David Servant (Con) | Peter Longthorn (Lab) | Elaine Byrom (Con) |
| 2008 | David Servant (Con) | Peter Longthorn (Lab) | Elaine Byrom (Con) |
| 2010 | Sinead Engel (Lab) | Peter Longthorn (Lab) | Elaine Byrom (Con) |
| 2011 | Sinead Engel (Lab) | Carol Ann Thirkill (Lab) | Elaine Byrom (Con) |
| 2012 | Sinead Engel (Lab) | Carol Thirkill (Lab) | Anjali Michelle Swallow (Lab Co-op) |
| 2014 | Sinead Engel (Lab) | Carol Thirkill (Lab) | Michelle Swallow (Lab Co-op) |
| 2015 | Sinead Engel (Lab) | Carol Thirkill (Lab) | Michelle Swallow (Lab Co-op) |
| 2016 | Sinead Engel (Lab) | Carol Thirkill (Lab) | Michelle Swallow (Lab Co-op) |
| 2018 | Sinead Engel (Lab) | Carol Thirkill (Lab) | Michelle Swallow (Lab Co-op) |

indicates seat up for re-election.

== Geography ==
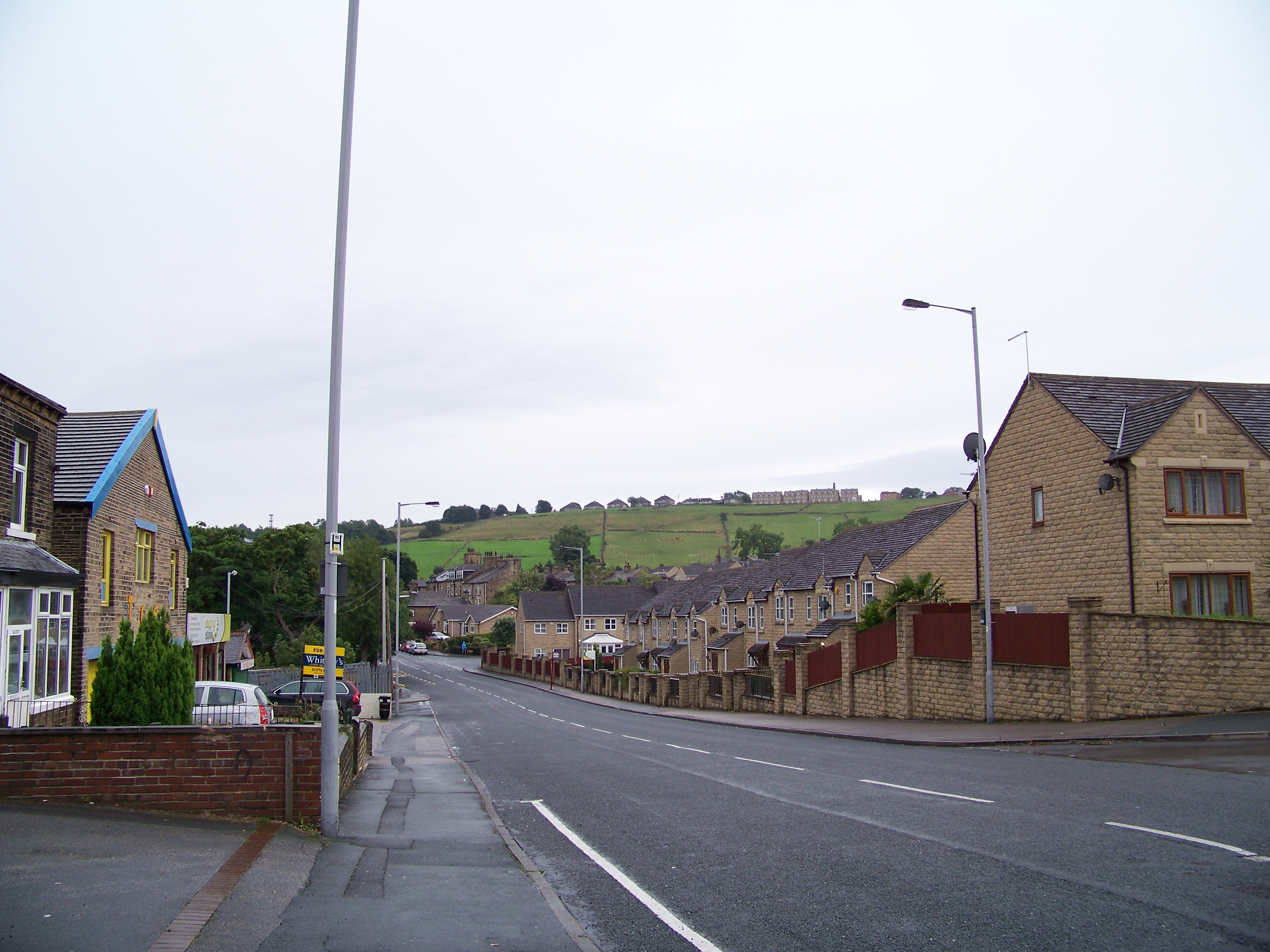
Station Road, Clayton showing the steep valley sides with Clayton Heights at the top of hill.

Clayton is located at about 720 feet (220 m) above sea level at the south end of a relatively flat ridge of land on the south side of Clayton Beck valley. The valley drops steeply below this shoulder of land and rises steeply to the south, south-east and south-west. The soil is mainly of a clay character but there are deposits of sandstone and gritstone.

The village is three miles from Bradford city centre, with the village of Thornton located on the other side of the valley and the village of Queensbury further up the hill that Clayton is situated on. Clayton Beck runs through the bottom of the valley below Clayton and tributaries for this stream, including Bull Grieve Beck, run through the village.

The centre of the village is designated as a conservation area in 1977. The main street of the village – Clayton Lane – which runs alongside the park, includes several traditional pubs, a popular crawl route for many residents. Starting at the top of the lane is the Fleece, moving down past the Royal Hotel to the Albion and the Black Bull – the oldest pub in the area. The now-defunct Clayton Tide newspaper described the central role of the pubs in Clayton village life in a 15 August 1861 account of a visit to the village by Pablo Fanque, the popular Victorian circus owner who The Beatles later immortalised in the song Being for the Benefit of Mr. Kite! The Clayton Tide reported, "On Sunday, a great number of persons visited the village, but ignoring the "Teetotal Lectures" which were given at Town Bottom, the public houses were well attended. Mr Pablo Fanque, always welcome on such occasions, was present and a damsel in his company, who emulated Blondin's feats, drew a large crowd."

Clayton boasts several shops, churches and a nearby golf club and country park at Thornton View with views of the city of Bradford and the village of Thornton across the valley.

== Demographics ==
The 2001 census recorded 14,491 people living in the Clayton and Fairweather Green ward in 5,691 households, increasing to 16,982 at the 2011 Census.

Clayton population 1831-1971
| Year | Population |
|---|---|
| 1831 | 3,609 |
| 1891 | 7,484 |
| 1901 | 5,119 |
| 1911 | 4,863 |
| 1921 | 5,043 |
| 1931 | 5,491 |
| 1951 | 7,103 |
| 1971 | 14,332 |
Data for Clayton parish from UK Census results

== Transport ==
Clayton is lies within the West Yorkshire Metro area. It no longer has a rail service but the terminus for two regular bus routes. Buses to the village are run by First West Yorkshire and are designated the orange route within Bradford district. The two bus services are the 636 and the 637 both of which follow the same route out of Bradford until the junction of Bradford Road and Pasture Lane at the end of Clayton Road and the start of the village. The 636 service terminates at the end of the Avenue in Clayton as do some of the buses in the 637 services with the rest terminating at Town End. Both services terminate, after passing through Bradford city centre at Bradford Lane, Gain Lane and Thornbury Leisure Complex. As of 2008 buses run from the village from around 5am on weekdays and Saturday, then every 20 minutes from 9am to around 6pm and the last bus just before 11 pm, the last bus for the village leaves Bradford city centre at around 11pm. On Sunday the services are less regular and start around 8am.

== Education ==
The village has four schools, three of which are state primary schools, Clayton St. John's Church of England Primary School, Bradford Road, Clayton Village Primary School, John Street and St. Anthony's Roman Catholic Primary School, Bradford Road. The first school in the village was built from public subscription in 1819, and was located on donated by the Lord of the manor, Richard Hodgson. In 1859 the original school was replaced by 1859 Clayton Village Primary School and this was joined by in 1897 by Methodist board school at Chrisharben Park. St. Anthony's Primary School was opened on 27 April 1954 and was named after the local Catholic Church. A school for Muslim girls, Jaamiatul Imaam Muhammad Zakaria School, was recently opened in the old Thornton View Hospital buildings on Thornton View Road.

== Religious sites ==
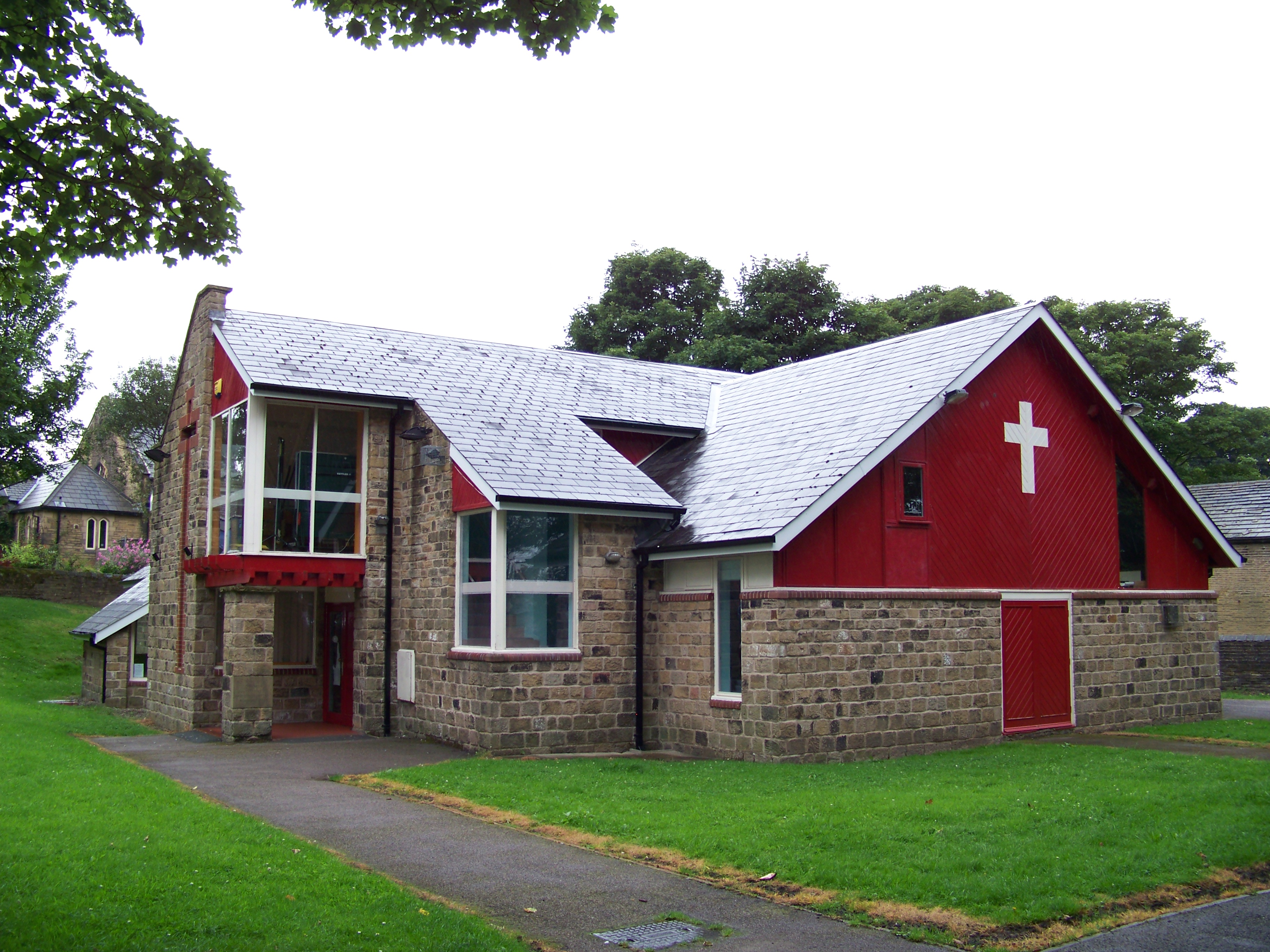
Clayton Baptist Church

The village has several Christian places of worship representing different denominations of Christianity as well as an active 'Churches Together' committee, which organises events such as monthly visits to Holly Park Nursing Home, a 'walk of witness' on Good Friday and carol singing at Christmas. Between them, the five churches are home to a whole range of activities; including parent & toddler sessions, youth clubs, life groups and senior citizen meals.

The Anglican parish church was opened on 19 January 1851 and is dedicated to St John the Baptist. A new 'Community Rooms' extension was opened in 2011 to provide additional space for church activities, art classes, community choir, Scouts and more.

The independent Clayton Gospel Hall is on Bradford Road, by the edge of the estate, and was opened by Mr. Richard Stammers on Saturday 10 March 1928. In 1978, the Gospel Hall was bolstered by a formerly Brethren congregation that began in Girlington but had lost tenancy of Kensington Hall. On Thursday evenings, the hall is home to 'Clan-aulder': West Yorkshire's only highland dance / piping group.

Clayton Baptist Church is located on School Street and was opened for worship on 1 September 1984 replacing the previous Baptist Church building that dated from 1891 but had to be demolished due to dry rot.

The village also has a Methodist church on Clayton Lane, known for its monthly coffee mornings, and St Anthony's Roman Catholic church is situated in the dip on Bradford Road, where it is linked to the Catholic primary school.

== Sports ==
Clayton has amateur sports teams in football, rugby, cricket and bowls. The local football team is Clayton Albion F.C. who run from the Black Bull Inn. They formed in 2018 and in their first season won Division Three of the Bradford Sunday Alliance as well as the Amateur Cup.

Clayton Rugby League Club play on Lidget Green Cricket Club their home kit is striped Burgundy Amber and their away kit is Blue. Between 1973 and 2003 the club was coached by Paul Gill and during this time won two Pennine Premier Division Championships and were in finals including nine Bradford Cup and a Yorkshire County Cup. The club has several teams including those for those under sixteen years old.

The club continues to thrive winning the Jack Senior Bradford Cup in March 2016 in a 'giant killing 26 6 win over neighbours Queensbury at Odsal Stadium. This followed up by another win in the Hudson Foster Bradford Supplementary Cup again at Odsal in May 2018 with a last minute win, again over their closest rivals Queensbury.

Clayton RLFC is thriving through the hard work of club coach Scotts Pendlebury at manager Dave Pickthall, both of whom have been with the club for over 25 years.

Clayton Cricket Club have 2 senior teams (1st & 2nd Team) that play in the Halifax Cricket League. While the Junior set up has 4 teams (Under 9s, Under 13s, Under 15s & Under 17s).

Mayfield Cricket Club have 2 senior teams (1st & 2nd Team) and are currently work towards establishing a junior cricket team. Mayfield Cricket Club are located on Mayfield Terrace, just off Pasture Lane. The club play in the Bradford Mutual Sunday School Cricket League on Saturday afternoons and Bradford Evening League on Wednesday Evenings.

A nine-hole parkland golf course with a par of 65, managed by Clayton Golf Club, is located at Thornton View Road. The club, founded in 1906, is members only and their facilities include a club house at the course.

== Community facilities ==
Clayton Library occupies the original village school building on Clayton Lane and its services include free computer and Internet access.

The village hall, on Reva Syke Road, serves tea and coffee every weekday morning and is available for function hire. A range of weekly groups use the village hall on a regular basis.

The Thornaby Hub on Thornaby Drive is home to Clayton Estate Community Action Group and 'Grub at The Hub' Foodbank.

Green End

There are a few established businesses in this area of Clayton Village, notably, Nail and Bodyworx, the Chiropodist, the Albion and Black Horse public house (or Black Bull, as most people call it) and the Tote betting shop.

Also, there is one butcher in Clayton (Taplin's).

== Noted Clayton people ==
Clayton was the birthplace and home of Albert Pierrepoint, Great Britain's last state executioner, he held the position until 1956. His father Henry Albert Pierrepoint, born in Clayton in 1876, was also a state executioner. Abe Waddington was born in Clayton on 4 February 1893 and was a bowler in the English cricket team from 1920 to 1921. Albert Pierrepoint was not Britain's last hangman. He retired from this position in 1956, while capital punishment continued until 1965. There was no single "Last Hangman", as the last two executions were carried out simultaneously, at 0800hrs, on 13 August 1964. The executioners were Harry Allen and Robert Leslie Stewart.

== See also ==
- Listed buildings in Clayton, West Yorkshire
