= Andrea Dunbar =

English playwright (1961–1990)

- Born: 22 May 1961; Bradford, West Riding of Yorkshire, England
- Died: 20 December 1990 (aged 29); Bradford, West Yorkshire, England
- Education: Buttershaw Comprehensive School
- Occupation: Playwright
- Writing career
- Literary movement: Realism

Andrea Dunbar (22 May 1961 – 20 December 1990) was an English playwright. She wrote The Arbor (1980) and Rita, Sue and Bob Too (1982), an autobiographical drama about the sexual adventures of teenage girls living in a run-down part of Bradford, West Yorkshire. She wrote most of the adaptation for the film Rita, Sue and Bob Too (1987).

Media

Images
- from Telegraph & Argus , color
- from Telegraph & Argus , monochrome
- Dunbar, on the Buttershaw public housing estate, in the early 1980
- Andrea Dunbar, facial scars from going through a glass window

Video
- Lisa Holdsworth: bringing Andrea Dunbar's story back to Bradford British Theatre Guide via YouTube

== Early life ==
Born on 22 May 1961, Dunbar was raised on Brafferton Arbor on the Buttershaw council estate in Bradford, England, with seven brothers and sisters. Both her parents had worked in the textile industry. Dunbar attended Buttershaw Comprehensive School.

"When 15-year-old Andrea Dunbar failed to bring in the ingredients for a domestic science lesson, her punishment was to spend her lunchtime writing the words ‘Why I Don’t Like Cookery’. What Andrea wrote instead was a witty essay on how baking buns was a middle-class pursuit and joints of meat were more practical for big families on Buttershaw estate. 'When the essay was passed around the staffroom, to howls of laughter, head of drama Tony Priestley was astonished at what he saw,' wrote Adelle Stripe in her acclaimed novel Black Teeth And A Brilliant Smile. 'It was obvious to him that she had a gift for saying the right thing. And she was funny. He asked if she’d like to join his class. What happened over coming months would change Andrea’s life forever.'"

== Career ==
Dunbar began her first play, The Arbor, in 1977 at the age of 15, writing it as a classroom assignment for CSE English, "in green biro on pages torn from a school exercise book". It is the story of "a Bradford schoolgirl who falls pregnant to her Pakistani boyfriend on a racist estate," and has an abusive drunken father. Encouraged by her teacher, she was helped to develop the play to performance standard. It received its première in 1980 at London's Royal Court Theatre, directed by Max Stafford-Clark. At the age of 18, Dunbar was the youngest playwright to have her work performed there. Alongside a play entered by Lucy Anderson Jones, The Arbor jointly won at the Young Writers' Festival, and was later augmented and performed in New York City. On 26 March 1980, she was featured in the BBC's Arena arts documentary series.

Dunbar was quickly commissioned to write a follow-up play, Rita, Sue and Bob Too, first performed in 1982, with Tracey Ullman. This explores similar themes to The Arbor through the lives of two teenage girls who are having affairs with the same married man. Dunbar's third and final play, Shirley (1986), places greater emphasis on a central character. It depicts a girl's "tumultuous relationship" with her mother. As she explained, she meant to write "about Shirley and John but, you know, I wrote the mother in and she bloody took over the whole play."

The film version of Rita, Sue and Bob Too (1987) was adapted for the cinema by Dunbar, directed by Alan Clarke and filmed on the Buttershaw estate. Dunbar disowned the film when more writers were brought in to give it a happier ending. However, it created considerable controversy on the estate because of its negative portrayal of the area. Dunbar was threatened by several residents, but nevertheless continued to live there.

In 2010 a commemorative blue plaque on Dunbar's former home on Brafferton Arbor was unveiled in the presence of her relatives.

== Personal life ==
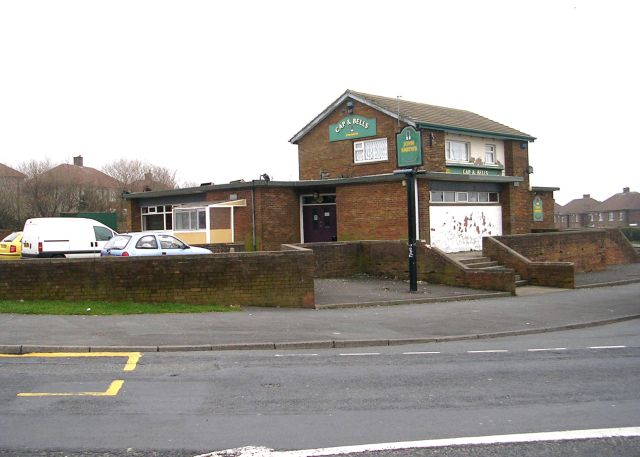
Cap and Bells pub, Cooper Lane, Buttershaw, March 2008. It was demolished in 2013.

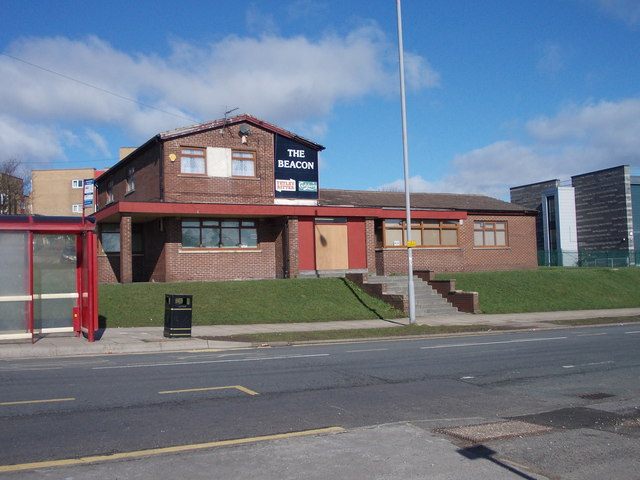
The Beacon pub, Reevy Road West, Buttershaw, March 2012

Dunbar first became pregnant at the age of 15; the baby was stillborn at six months. She later had three children by three different fathers. The first, Lorraine Dunbar, was born in 1979, and had a Pakistani father. A year later, in 1980, Lisa was born, again while Dunbar was still a teenager. About three years later, she had a son, Andrew, with Jim Wheeler.

As a single mother, Dunbar, spent 18 months in a refuge for battered women, living in a Women's Aid refuge in Keighley and became an increasingly heavy drinker.

"One day she was sat on a bar stool in the Cap n' Bells pub when someone she knew dragged her off the stool by her hair and threw her to the floor and then walked out."

"Having complained of headaches for weeks, she collapsed in her local pub and could not be revived."

In 1990, she died of a brain haemorrhage in Bradford Royal Infirmary at the age of 29, after falling ill in The Beacon, a pub on the Buttershaw Estate, at the junction of Reevy Road West and The Crescent. It was closed in 2016 and demolished in 2019, but appears in the opening shot of Rita, Sue and Bob Too. Her cremated remains were buried at Scholemoor Cemetery and Crematorium (Section N, Grave 1219) in Bradford. Her headstone is a small black granite cross.

In 2007, her eldest daughter Lorraine Dunbar, a heroin addict at the time, was convicted of manslaughter and jailed for three years, for causing the death of her child by gross neglect after the child ingested a lethal dose of methadone.

In January 2018, her daughter Lisa Pearce died of stomach cancer after having been diagnosed in December 2016.

"I grew up in Bradford in the 1980s, not much younger than Rita and Sue when the film came out and with pretty much the same dress sense. The three settings - manicured suburbia, the all-white Buttershaw estate, and the Victorian backstreets populated by Pakistani families - are familiar. (Bob’s street is very familiar: my schoolfriend Lucy lived on it, and if you look in the background of the scene where Fat Fucking Mavis pulls up in her Austin Metro, you can see her on her bike. God, I was jealous). I’ve watched it more times than I can count." — Anita Singh, The Telegraph

== Depictions ==
In 2000, Dunbar's life and her surroundings were revisited in the play A State Affair by Robin Soans.

A film about her life, The Arbor, directed by Clio Barnard, was released in 2010. The film uses actors lip-synching to interviews with Dunbar and her family, and concentrates on the strained relationship between Dunbar and her daughter Lorraine.

A novel inspired by Dunbar's life and work, Black Teeth and a Brilliant Smile by Adelle Stripe, was published in 2017 by Wrecking Ball Press. It was shortlisted for the Portico Prize for Literature and the Gordon Burn Prize. A second edition came from Fleet Publishing in the same year. In 2019, a stage adaptation by Freedom Studios and screenwriter Lisa Holdsworth was announced in The Guardian. Dramatisation of Stripe's novel focused on women's relationships, with a cast of five sharing the roles. It portrayed a teenage Dunbar rising to national note with her autobiographical works The Arbor and Rita, Sue and Bob Too, and the challenges of life on the Buttershaw estate in Bradford.

A 2019, Woolyback production for BBC Radio 4 written and directed by Sean Grundy – Rita, Sue and Andrea Too – dramatized the life and career of Dunbar, played by Natalie Gavin.

In April 2024, Bristol-based artist Stewy created a spray-painted stencil artwork of Andrea Dunbar, on the side of The Queen pub, on Bridge Street, in Bradford.

== Works ==
- The Arbor (1977)
- Rita, Sue and Bob Too (1982)
- Shirley (1986)
- Dunbar, Andrea; Soans, Robin (2000). Rita, Sue and Bob Too; A State Affair. Bloomsbury Academic. ISBN 978-0-413-75700-5.
