= Buttershaw Business and Enterprise College =

Buttershaw Business and Enterprise College Academy
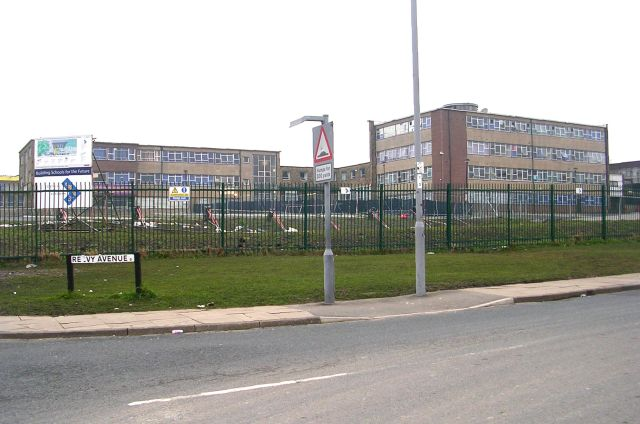
- The school, pictured from Reevy Avenue

Location
- Reevy Road West; Buttershaw; Bradford, West Yorkshire, BD6 3PX; England; 53.7652°N 1.7942°W

Information
- Type: Academy
- Religious affiliation: Church of England academy trust (BDAT)
- Established: 3 September 1956
- Local authority: Bradford
- Trust: Bradford Diocesan Academies Trust
- Specialist: Business and Enterprise
- Department for Education URN: 142825 Tables
- Ofsted: Reports
- Head of School: Andrew Taylor
- Gender: Co-educational
- Age: 11 to 16
- Enrolment: 1,461
- Capacity: 1610
- Language: English
- Publication: BBEC Buzz
- Website: https://www.buttershaw.net/

Buttershaw Business and Enterprise College is a co-educational secondary school located in the Buttershaw area of Bradford, West Yorkshire, England.

== History ==
It opened on 3 September 1956 as Buttershaw Secondary School, with only one three storey teaching block as it was only half built. The initial intake was 300 children and 12 staff. Mr H E Cooke was the first headmaster. Over the next seven years a house block, theatre and swimming pool were added with an official opening in 1964. The school was built to accommodate the baby boom caused by the large number of children born after the end of the Second World War.

It was renamed Buttershaw Comprehensive School, and over the years it evolved into an Upper, then High School, removing its pool for an AstroTurf field. On 23 September 2006 over 100 pupils from the first intake of 1956 met at the Cedar Court Hotel, Bradford to celebrate the school's Golden Anniversary. In the 2007 Queens Birthday Honours list David Kershaw, the school's first head boy (1956), was made a CBE for his services to education. 2008 saw the opening of the new building. As the new building was opened the school was renamed Buttershaw Business and Enterprise College because of its new specialist status.

Buttershaw Business and Enterprise College became a foundation school administered by the Buttershaw Learning and Achievement Trust and Bradford City Council. However, in September 2016 the school converted to academy status and is now sponsored by the Bradford Diocesan Academies Trust.

== Academics ==
'There is variability in the experience of pupils at the school'.

Unfortunately, Buttershaw routinely underperforms in national examinations, with a progress 8 score of -0.83 (well below average) and a grade 5 GCSE pass rate of 21.4%, just over half of the national average. Buttershaw offers GCSEs and BTECs as programmes of study for pupils, however the sixth form is now closed.

Under the latest Ofsted inspection, the school was rated 'Requires Improvement', with the report citing 'some changes to improve the learning and behaviour', 'pupils with SEND do not achieve as well as they could', 'pupils do not show respect for each other or other diverse groups', however safeguarding was reported to be effective. This is an improvement from the previous inspection grade of 'Inadequate'.

== Notable former pupils ==
- Susanna Clarke, Author
- Alex Corina, Artist
- Andrea Dunbar, Playwright
- John Duttine, Actor
- Paul Reas, Photographer
- Terry Rooney, Labour Party politician
- Cameron Scott, Rugby League Player
