= Wellington School, Bebington =

Former private school in Wirral, England

Coordinates: 53.3554°N 3.0056°W

Location
- Wellington Road; Bebington; England

Information
- Funding type: Private school
- Motto: Honor Praemium Virtutis (Honour is the Reward Of Virtue)
- Established: 1953
- Founder: John Philip Fogg
- Closed: 1995
- Gender: Boys (1953-1986); Mixed (1986-1995)
- Houses: School; Frobisher; Grenville; Marlborough

Wellington School was a small private day school in Wellington Road, Bebington, Metropolitan Borough of Wirral, England, active between 1953 and 1995.

== History ==
Founded by John Philip Fogg (born 1917) in 1953, the main school building (Mount Allars) was bought with the accrued 'war pay' owed to Fogg, who was an officer in the mercantile marine, captured in 1941 by the Japanese and held as a POW for four years. A visionary and an idealist, Fogg was deeply influenced by the educational reforms which were realised by a series of Christian school masters in the nineteenth century. His interests included: playing the organ; the Middle Ages; mediaeval art, literature and architecture; chivalry; the Romantic poets; the Lake District and motoring in his vintage pre-war motor car. His churchmanship was "low" with a strong affiliation to nonconformity.

The school was run for many decades by the owner, Fogg (who was known as "The Gaffer"), and who served as the headmaster and a teacher of languages (Latin, German and French,) and by deputy headmaster Brian E. Bristow (who taught geography, geology, commerce, and 'current affairs'). Fogg's wife, Enid, assisted in the running of the domestic side of the school.

Until 1968–1969, the school's official uniform, supplied by Messrs Watson Prickard of North John Street, Liverpool, consisted of both a winter and spring blazer in a deep bottle green, and a summer blazer, which was striped in the school colours: green, yellow, black and red. Both had matching caps.

The school had four houses, each with its own colour: School (red), Frobisher (blue), Grenville (black) and Marlborough (green).

The school's "Notes for Boys" were issued to every boy in the 1960s and were contained in a small green card-covered booklet with the school's coat of arms and motto on the front, the contents of which the prefects expected each boy to learn by heart. They were known as "The Ten Commandments", and covered aspects of a boy's conduct and appearance: for example, " long hair among boys is effeminate, grotesque and unhygienic". New boys were also expected to learn the words of the school song, which was sung at the annual Prize Giving, held at Hulme Hall, Port Sunlight, and the school hymn, "Now thank we all our God".

School fees in 1968–1969 were 48 guineas per term without extras, and luncheon was half a crown per day. By the late 1960s, pupils numbered around 240.

Fogg's political views were evident in the granting to the whole school a half holiday in 1970, following the fall of the Wilson government.

The school consciously attempted to ensure that the ethos and conduct of its pupils and its assistant masters (who taught in gowns) maintained a standard that would have been expected before the Second World War. Its values ran firmly against the prevailing counterculture of the 1960s and 1970s. During this time, the academic staff and the prefects both administered corporal punishment.

The Army Cadet Force, under the command of Captain Hartley in the 1960s and early 1970s, was active and held an annual summer camp. Training and 'square bashing' took place on Fridays after hours; some indication of the ACF's intended status is that members were permitted to wear their military uniforms when travelling to and from school and throughout the day's classes. On the school's Open Evening of 1975, visitors were treated to the sight -- and sound -- of a mock storming of an 'enemy position' on the school lawn, complete with blank rifle cartridges and 'thunderflash' grenades. Complaints from the surrounding residents ensured that the spectacle was not repeated in subsequent years.

There was an annual school literary magazine and a choir, which had an annual outing to Trentham Gardens in Staffordshire. It sung at the annual service of nine lessons and carols, which was held alternately at Christ Church, Higher Bebington, or at Christ Church, Port Sunlight.

School chaplains included Revd Bowers in 1968 and Revd J P Macmillan, vicar of Emmanuel Church, New Brighton, in the early to mid-1970s.

In the late 1970s, an occasional visitor to school classes was a 'Professor Mays', apparently an educationalist with a research interest in adolescence and permission to sit with and interview boys unsupervised. (This is likely to have been the Liverpool University social scientist John Barron Mays [1914-1987].)

The school's playing fields were situated on the Clatterbridge Road, equidistant between the village of Willaston, Wirral, and Clatterbridge Hospital.

Fogg's educational philosophy can be summarised by his own words: "It is the headmaster's firm conviction that, given the right environment, a boy will seek to emulate the good example of those who strive to guide him".

Distinguished old boys from this period include:

- Sir Robert Stephen John Sparks, born 1949, the Channing Wills Professor of Geology in the Department of Earth Sciences at the University of Bristol, is one of the world's leading volcanologists and has been widely recognised for his work in this field. Professor Sparks was President of the Geological Society of London from 1994–1996 and has been hugely influential in the fields of both volcanology and igneous petrology. He has published over 300 papers, which have been cited more than 10,000 times.
- Michael John Storey, Baron Storey of Childwall, born 1949, the Liberal Democrat politician and spokesman on Education in the House of Lords, who was the former Leader of Liverpool City Council and Lord Mayor of Liverpool between 2009 and 2010.
- Warwick Roy Stafford (1951–2009), regarded by his masters at Wellington, the teachers at Wallasey Art College and Newcastle Polytechnic and elsewhere, as a talented painter of still lives and portraits, many of whose works are now held in the Williamson Art Gallery in Birkenhead, and also hang in the public collections held at the Universities of Northumbria and Bristol, studied at Wellington between 1965 and 1968. There is an annual research fellowship named in his honour at the University of Northumbria. The Warwick Stafford Fellowship is an annual prize aimed at early-career artists and has been awarded since 2012.

Wellington started as a preparatory school, but soon began admitting older boys, becoming a prominent local institution in the 1960s, '70s and '80s, with an academic and sporting record that created a wide catchment area. Oxford and Cambridge, Bristol, Durham and Liverpool were amongst the many universities to which its pupils progressed.

Following Fogg's retirement the school's academic record was not maintained. On 29 August 1992, the Independent wrote: "With an average of only 1.4 A-level passes per pupil, judged solely on its exam results, Wellington School in the Wirral could be the worst fee-paying school in the country." Basing their comments on a table published in the Financial Times, the newspaper's educational reporters opined: "Wellington, which says in The Equitable Schools Book 1992 that art and music are its strongest departments, scored an average of 6.1 UCCA points per pupil, based on a score of 10 points for an A grade, eight for a B, six for a C and so on. Many state schools are way ahead".

Wellington became co-educational in September 1986 after being sold to Christopher Kirch, the headmaster and owner of Avalon School, West Kirby, who then became Wellington's second headmaster. Although Kirch sold Wellington in 1987 to Nord Anglia Education PLC, he held the post of headmaster until December 1990.

In January 1991, Wellington's third headmaster was appointed, Terrence Capper, the long-serving art and pottery master, who had succeeded Bristow as deputy headmaster. Capper's tenure was short, and he retired during the 1992–1993 academic year due to ill health. During much of this academic year, the school was run by Dr. Brian Scott, his deputy headmaster, who subsequently became Wellington's fourth and final headmaster, serving from September 1993 until the school's closure on 12 July 1995. Scott subsequently became headmaster of Avalon School, West Kirby, where he served until his retirement in the summer of 2009.

The school's motto was Honor Praemium Virtutis (Honour is the Reward of Virtue) taken from a passage in the works of Cicero.

Despite a campaign by teaching staff and parents to keep the school open, Wellington was closed in summer 1995. The site was sold to developers, its Victorian buildings were torn down, and they were replaced by a housing estate, despite the concerted, but ultimately unsuccessful, efforts of several Old Wellingtonians to have the original buildings listed. It is still surrounded by the school's original stone walls and trees.
