= Rita, Sue and Bob Too =

1987 British film by Alan Clarke

- Theatrical release poster
- Directed by: Alan Clarke
- Screenplay by: Andrea Dunbar
- Based on: Rita, Sue and Bob Too and The Arbor by Andrea Dunbar
- Produced by: Oscar Lewenstein; Sanford Lieberson
- Starring: Michelle Holmes; Siobhan Finneran; George Costigan; Lesley Sharp
- Cinematography: Ivan Strasburg
- Edited by: Steve Singleton
- Music by: Michael Kamen
- Production companies: British Screen; Umbrella Entertainment
- Distributed by: Mainline Pictures; Film Four International
- Release date: 29 May 1987
- Running time: 93 minutess
- Country: United Kingdom
- Language: English
- Budget: £993,000

Rita, Sue and Bob Too (stylised as Rita, Sue and Bob too!) is a 1987 British comedy-drama film directed by Alan Clarke and starring Michelle Holmes, Siobhan Finneran, George Costigan, and Lesley Sharp. Set in Bradford, West Yorkshire, it follows two teenage schoolgirls who end up having a sexual affair with a married man. It was written by Andrea Dunbar, who adapted the film from two of her stage plays: Rita Sue and Bob Too (1982) and The Arbor (1980), which were first performed at the Royal Court Theatre in London. The plays were loosely based on Dunbar's experiences growing up in council housing in Buttershaw.

The strapline of the film was "Thatcher's Britain with her knickers down." It met with polarised reactions at the time of its release, but has since become a cult hit for its depiction of working-class life in Britain during the 1980s. In 2017, it was given a digital restoration by the British Film Institute.

== Plot ==
Rita and Sue are two teenage girls in their final year of school who live on a run-down council estate in Bradford. They babysit for Bob and Michelle, a middle-class couple who live in a better part of town. While driving the girls home, Bob stops on the Yorkshire moors and complains about his wife's lack of interest in sex. He proposes sex with both girls. They happily agree, and an affair between the three of them begins.

Michelle suspects his infidelity, due to a past affair and finding his packet of condoms. Bob denies having relations with either Sue or Rita, and the girls also try to assuage her suspicions. Later, Rita and Sue meet Bob again, but he cannot get an erection, embarrassing himself and leaving them unsatisfied. He takes them to a club where Michelle's friend, Mavis, sees them together. Bob warns the girls that Mavis will surely tell Michelle.

The next day, Mavis does so, and Michelle gets Mavis to drive her to Rita's house. Michelle drags Rita out of her house and takes her to confront Sue at her home. Bob also arrives, and an argument erupts which also involves Sue's parents, causing a scene in front of all the neighbours. After Bob and Sue's drunken father almost come to blows, Rita's brothers come to rescue her on their motorbikes. Michelle goes home, angrily ransacks the house, and then leaves Bob for good, taking the children with her.

The next day, Rita informs Sue that, although they only have two remaining weeks of school, she is dropping out because she is pregnant with Bob's child. She admits to having seen Bob a few times without Sue, and says she is moving in with him now that Michelle has left him. When Bob arrives to collect Rita, Sue is enraged and tells them both to get lost.

To get over Bob, Sue starts dating Aslam, a young Pakistani man who is a driver for the taxi firm she works at. Sue's father, while drunk, shouts racist abuse at Aslam. After this, Sue moves in with Aslam and his sister.

Sue finds out that Rita has suffered a miscarriage and goes to visit her in hospital. On the way out, Bob invites Sue for another sexual escapade, but she rebuffs him. He still gives Sue a lift home, but Aslam sees her getting out of Bob's car and threatens her, as he thinks that she was out having sex with Bob.

Later, while Bob and Rita are having sex at home, he accidentally calls out Sue's name. She assumes Bob is seeing Sue behind her back, storms out of the house and goes to confront Sue. When Rita tells Aslam of her suspicions, Aslam violently attacks Sue. Despite everything, Rita comes to Sue's defence and kicks Aslam in the knee. Sue then kicks him in his groin, and they make a hasty escape. They go to Bob's house, where Rita tends to Sue's wounds, but Aslam arrives and tries to break in, while trying to convince Sue to forgive him. The police arrive, having been called by a neighbour. Aslam runs off, with the police in pursuit.

When Bob returns home, Rita tells him that she has invited Sue to move in with them. The girls go upstairs, leaving Bob feeling unwanted. However, when Bob goes into the bedroom, he finds both girls in bed waiting for him, and he joins them.

== Cast ==
- Siobhan Finneran as Rita
- Michelle Holmes as Sue
- George Costigan as Bob
- Lesley Sharp as Michelle
- Kulvinder Ghir as Aslam
- Willie Ross as Sue's father
- Patti Nichols as Sue's mother
- Danny O'Dea as Paddy
- Maureen Long as Rita's mother
- David Britton, Mark Crampton, Stuart Googwin, Max Jackman, Andrew Krauz and Simon Waring as Rita's brothers
- Joyce Pembroke as Lawnmower Lil
- Jane Atkinson as Helen
- Bryan Heeley as Michael
- Paul Oldham as Lee
- Bernard Wrigley as Teacher
- Dennis Conlon as Taxi Driver
- Black Lace (Alan Barton and Dene Michael) as themselves
- Nancy Pute as Mavis
- Paul Hedges as Hosepipe Harry
- Kailash Patel as Aslam's Sister

== Production ==
=== Background ===
Playwright and screenwriter Andrea Dunbar based the story partly on her own life and on "two raucous girls she overheard in the ladies' toilet at Keighley Market".

=== Filming locations ===
Film locations in West Yorkshire included Buttershaw, where scenes of Rita's house, Sue's flat, the girls' school, and The Beacon pub on Reevy Road West from the very first scene were all shot. All of these buildings have now been demolished.

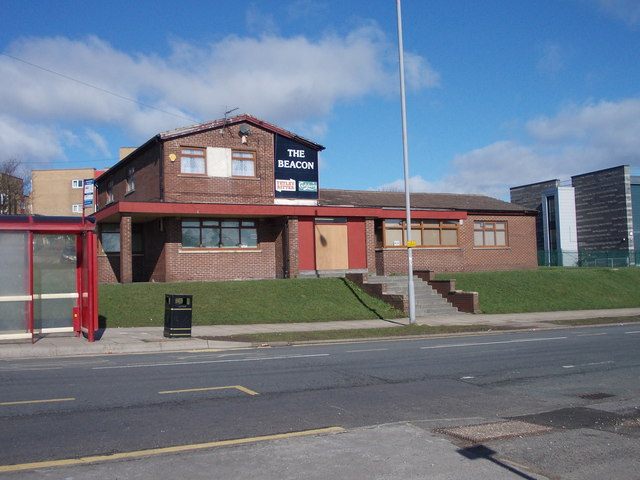
The Beacon pub, Reevy Road West, Buttershaw, March 2012

Other locations included Baildon Moor (Moorland scenes) and 5 Bramham Drive in Baildon (Bob's house); Alexandra Street (Aslam's house) and Leeds Road in Bradford (Sue's workplace Luna Radio Kars); Haworth (the school trip to the Brontë Parsonage); Woodhead Road in Bradford; and the Staveley Garages in Shipley.

== Critical reception ==
Rita, Sue and Bob Too premiered to a divided response and controversy in Britain. Some Bradford residents felt offended by the film and thought it portrayed the area in a negative light. Writing in The Guardian, film critic Derek Malcolm gave the film a mostly positive review, stating that "Siobhan Finneran and Michelle Holmes play the girls with the kind of authenticity that precludes glamour in favour of guts and garters...". He also praised director Alan Clarke's ability to "energise the whole thing with ace professionalism, just occasionally seeing the funny side of what is essentially a sad story...". He goes on to say that the film avoids sentimentality but lacks something; "[the film] wipes the comfort from the face of a lot of dimly perceived and sloppy notions, but it replaces those notions with nothing."

American media was largely positive. Roger Ebert of the Chicago Sun-Times gave it 3 out of 4 stars, and having watched it twice noted that some audiences were uneasy at its mixed tone, which he described as "angry", "sometimes depressing", and "more interested in human nature than in selling lots of tickets with lots of sex." He wrote, "The movie challenges us to disapprove of the conditions that produced Rita and Sue, rather than to take a safe, superficial stand against that rascal Bob, but here I am lecturing, and the curious thing about Rita, Sue and Bob Too is that it does not lecture and contains no speeches". Variety called the film "a sad-funny comedy about sex and life in the Yorkshire city of Bradford". The Washington Post's Hal Hinson, however, expressed that the film needed to further examine the predatory nature of Bob's actions.

Screenwriter Andrea Dunbar disliked Alan Clarke's film adaptation, which changed the original ending in her play to be more upbeat, criticising: "You'd never go back with somebody who had betrayed you".

"In the play, Rita winds up having a baby and marrying Bob. Her friendship with Sue falls apart, though she names her daughter after her. At the very end, Sue’s mother and Bob’s ex wife come together in solidarity, the former declaring: “All fellas do the dirty on you sometime or other. Only let them come on your conditions and stick to them. Don’t let them mess you around.” But the film ends differently – with a kind of punch line, though it is unclear whom the joke’s on. In the final scene, Bob literally jumps back into bed with both Rita and Sue."

Nonetheless, the success of the film revived Dunbar's plays. The film has also amassed a cult following for its unblinking look at the working class in northern England, as well as for its 1980s style and fashions. Film Inquiry said "it contains no real plot, to speak of, essentially riding the beats of any story that deals with extra-marital affairs. But it is in the treatment of the people it follows that the film scores a hat trick." Starburst Magazine said that "At it's [sic] heart, though, there is a refreshingly frank and honest, not to mention amusingly real representation of how awkward and believable the reality of sexual experiences can be..."

On the review aggregator website Rotten Tomatoes, 80% of 5 critics' reviews are positive. Metacritic, which uses a weighted average, assigned the film a score of 71 out of 100, based on 12 critics, indicating "generally favorable" reviews.

In 2024, Kate Muir of The Times called the film "a high-octane hit of comic teenage energy...[with a] mostly unspoken layer of social commentary".

== Rita, Sue and Andrea Too ==
In June 2019, BBC Radio 4 broadcast the play Rita, Sue and Andrea Too. The play dramatises the life and career of writer Andrea Dunbar, whose own experiences were partly the basis for her original plays The Arbor (1980) and Rita, Sue and Bob Too (1982), both of which were the basis for the 1987 film.
