= Clio Barnard =

British film director

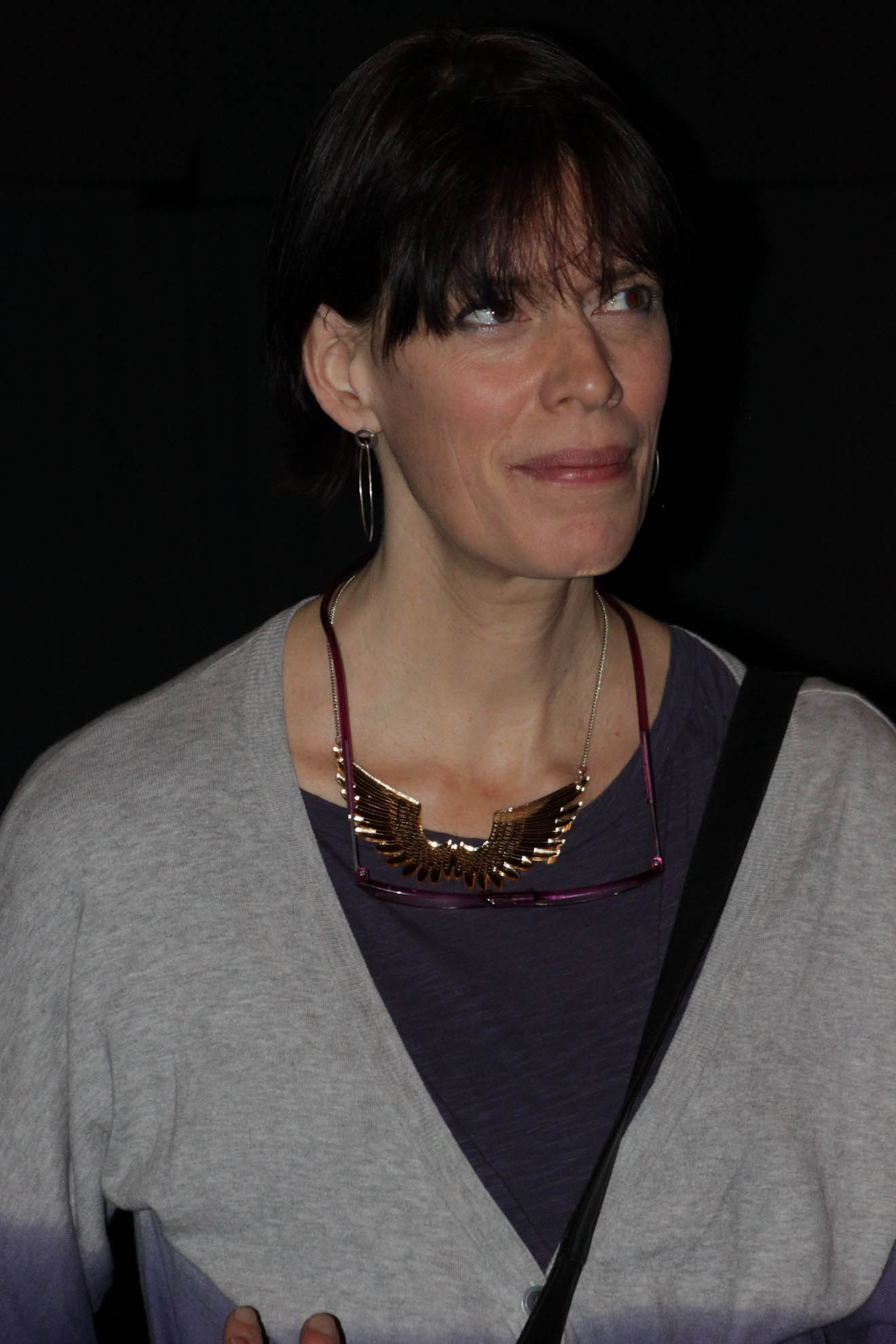
- Clio Barnard in Mexico City, Mexico in 2012
- Born: 1 January 1965 (age 61)
- Occupation: Film director
- Years active: 2000–present

Clio Barnard (born 1 January 1965) is a British director of documentary and feature films. She won widespread critical acclaim and multiple awards for her debut, The Arbor, an experimental documentary about Bradford playwright Andrea Dunbar. In 2013 she was hailed as a significant new voice in British cinema for her film The Selfish Giant, which premiered in the Director's Fortnight section of the Cannes Film Festival.

== Early life and education ==
Barnard grew up in the town of Otley in Yorkshire. Her father was a university lecturer and her mother was an artist who later became a jazz singer. She graduated from Newcastle Polytechnic (now Northumbria University), with a First Class B.A. (Hons) with distinction in fine art and received a Postgraduate Diploma in Electronic Imaging at the Duncan of Jordanstone College of Art and Design (University of Dundee). In 1988, her postgrad video work Dirt and Science featured Jane and Louise Wilson and toured internationally as part of the ICA Biennial of Independent Film & Video, curated by Tilda Swinton.

== Reception and awards ==
Critics have likened Barnard's realist yet lyrical work to that of Ken Loach. Time Out said of The Selfish Giant, "this is Kes revisited in a post-Thatcher northern England."

Her debut feature The Arbor (2010) produced by Artangel, won several awards, including Best New Documentary Filmmaker at Tribeca Film Festival New York, Best Newcomer and Sutherland Awards at The London Film Festival, Douglas Hickox Award at British Independent Film Awards, The Guardian First Film Award, Best Screenplay at the London Evening Standard Film Awards, the Sheffield Documentary Film Festival Innovation Award and the Jean Vigo Award for Best Direction at Punto de Vista International Documentary Film Festival. She was nominated for the BAFTA Outstanding Debut Award in February 2011.

In October 2026, Clio Barnard won the Golden Hitchcock (Best Film) at the Dinard British & Irish Film Festival for I See Buildings Fall Like Lightning.

== Musical collaborations ==
"An Acre of Land" is a collaboration between British composer Harry Escott and PJ Harvey and is the theme Barnard's film Dark River. Escott says: ‘recording PJ Harvey’s vocal on “An Acre of Land”, a song we arranged together for Dark River, was a spine-tingling experience.’ The film premiered at the 2017 London Film Festival and was released in 2018.

== Influences ==
Barnard participated in the 2022 edition of the Sight & Sound film polls, which are held every ten years to commemorate the greatest films of all time and rank them in order. Directors and critics both give their ten favourite films of all time for the poll, and Barnard picked The Gospel According to St. Matthew (1964), Rashomon (1950), Fear Eats the Soul (1974), Andrei Rublev (1966), L'Atalante (1934), Road (1987), Chronicle of a Summer (1961), Vagabond (1985), Hunger (2008) and La strada (1954).

== Filmography ==
Short film

Year	Title	Director	Writer	Producer
1995	Hermaphrodite Bikini	Yes	No	No
2000	Lambeth Marsh	Yes	No	No
2002	Random Acts of Intimacy	Yes	No	No
2003	Flood	Yes	Yes	Yes
2006	Dark Glass	Yes	No	No
2023	All the Lights Still Burning	No	No	Executive

Feature film

Year	Title	Director	Writer	Executive producer
2010	The Arbor	Yes	No	No
2013	The Selfish Giant	Yes	Yes	No
2017	Dark River	Yes	Yes	No
2021	Ali & Ava	Yes	Yes	No
2026	I See Buildings Fall Like Lightning	Yes	No	Yes

Television

Year	Title	Director	Executive producer	Writer	Notes
2022	The Essex Serpent	Yes	Yes	Yes	Miniseries
2024	Sherwood	Yes	Yes	No	Directed 3 episodes (series 2)
