= Seeing Red (Ms. Marvel) =

- Ms. Marvel episode
- Promotional poster
- Episode no.: Episode 4
- Directed by: Sharmeen Obaid-Chinoy
- Story by: Sabir Pirzada
- Teleplay by: Sabir Pirzada; A. C. Bradley; Matthew Chauncey
- Cinematography by: Jules O'Loughlin
- Editing by: Nona Khodai
- Original release date: June 29, 2022
- Running time: 48 minutes

Cast
- Ali Alsaleh as Aadam; Dan Carter as Saleem; Vardah Aziz as Zainab; Asfandyar Khan as Owais; Anjana Ghogar as Rukhsana Auntie; Zawar Jafri as Muadhin; Zion Usman as Young Sana

Episode chronology
| ← Previous "Destined" | Next → "Time and Again" |

"Seeing Red" is the fourth episode of the American television miniseries Ms. Marvel, based on Marvel Comics featuring the character Ms. Marvel. It follows Kamala Khan as she travels to Karachi, Pakistan to learn more about her mysterious bangle. The episode is set in the Marvel Cinematic Universe (MCU), sharing continuity with the films of the franchise. It was written by Sabir Pirzada, A. C. Bradley, and Matthew Chauncey, with a story by Pirzada. The episode was directed by Sharmeen Obaid-Chinoy.

Iman Vellani stars as Kamala Khan, alongside Zenobia Shroff, Rish Shah, Samina Ahmad, Fawad Khan, Nimra Bucha, Mehwish Hayat, Adaku Ononogbo, Farhan Akhtar, and Aramis Knight. Obaid-Chinoy joined the series by September 2020 to direct two episodes.

"Seeing Red" was released on Disney+ on June 29, 2022.

== Plot ==
Kamala Khan and her mother Muneeba travel to Karachi, Pakistan, and reunite with her grandmother Sana, who later reveals to Khan that the bangle is trying to convey a message through the vision of the train. The next day, a masked Khan goes to the train station to investigate, but is attacked by Kareem, a member of the Red Daggers vigilante group, who initially mistakes her for one of the Clandestines. Kareem takes Khan to the Red Daggers' hideout, where Kamala learns from their leader Waleed that the Clandestines are trying to break the Veil of the Noor dimension, which separates the Djinns' dimension from the human world, in order to expand and take over.

The Clandestines escape the Department of Damage Control's supermax prison, but their leader Najma abandons her son Kamran for helping Khan. Khan begins training with the Red Daggers to master her powers, but they are interrupted by the Clandestines. A chase ensues, during which Waleed kills one of the Clandestines but is fatally stabbed by Najma. As Khan and Kareem fend off the Clandestines, Kareem kills one of them and Najma accidentally stabs the bangle, sending Khan into a vision of the partition of India.

== Production ==
=== Development ===
By August 2019, Marvel Studios had begun development on a Ms. Marvel television series for the streaming service Disney+. In September 2020, Sharmeen Obaid-Chinoy was hired to direct three episodes, ultimately directing two episodes, including the fourth. Executive producers include Marvel Studios' Kevin Feige, Louis D'Esposito, Victoria Alonso, and Brad Winderbaum, in addition to Kamala Khan co-creator Sana Amanat, lead directors Adil El Arbi and Bilall Fallah, and head writer Bisha K. Ali. The fourth episode, titled "Seeing Red", was written by Sabir Pirzada, A. C. Bradley, and Matthew Chauncey, from a story by Pirzada.

=== Writing ===
Amanat enjoyed the boldness of the series visiting Pakistan in this episode, initially believing going to the country would have been something that would have occurred in a hypothetical second season. Part of bringing the story and Kamala to Pakistan was for her to meet the members of the Order of the Red Daggers, who are heroes who look like her, unlike the Western heroes she has been idolizing, and to instill in her that it does not "really matter about code names or armor or what kinds of clothes that you're wearing as long as you're linked to something much greater". She also liked changing the solo hero Red Dagger from the comics into an entire order, wishing the episode provided more of their backstory because the creatives had more ideas for them than they were able to shoot.

Regarding Kareem being introduced as another romantic interest for Kamala, Amanat said it was not one "right now" and the creatives "intentionally pulled back on that". Aramis Knight, who plays Kareem, agreed that his relationship with Kamala could turn romantic in the future, but felt at the moment, Kamala has become a great friend and a trusted ally to him.

=== Casting ===
The episode stars Iman Vellani as Kamala Khan, Zenobia Shroff as Muneeba Khan, Rish Shah as Kamran, Samina Ahmad as Sana, Fawad Khan in photographs as Hasan, Nimra Bucha as Najma, Mehwish Hayat as Aisha, Adaku Ononogbo as Fariha, Farhan Akhtar as Waleed, and Aramis Knight as Kareem / Red Dagger. Also appearing are Ali Alsaleh as Aadam, Dan Carter as Saleem, Vardah Aziz as Zainab, Asfandyar Khan as Owais, Anjana Ghogar as Rukhsana Auntie, Zawar Jafri as Muadhin, and Zion Usman as young Sana. Matt Lintz and Yasmeen Fletcher were also credited in the episode despite not appearing.

=== Design ===
External videos
- Marvel Studios' Ms. Marvel: End Credits Main On End Title Sequence Episode 4 presents the episode's main-on-end title sequence, YouTube video from Perception's channel

The episode's "previously on" segments features the text in Urdu, and the episode's end credits feature images of Karachi, replacing those of Jersey City from the previous episodes. Thailand stands in for Pakistan in the series, with the production unable to shoot in that country because of its political situation. When scouting other parts of Asia to potentially film in, Obaid-Chinoy felt Thailand had the most South Asian look. She worked with production designer Christopher Glass and the other designers to faithfully recreate Karachi, sharing images and mood boards with them of her favorite locations from her hometown to recreate, with Glass finding "an ideal location" in Bangkok for their recreated Karachi that was "hyper-real and colorful". Sana's house was built for the episode on the site of an old nightclub, despite attempts to find an existing house to use, and replicated much of Obiad-Chinoy's house that she grew up in. A large Ant-Man mural at the Karachi train station was created by local street artists, created in the style of Ms. Marvel comic artist Adrian Alphona. The series' main-on-end title sequence was designed by Perception who were given visuals by Marvel Studios of Karachi to develop the sequence. Perception designed the murals, "combining elements from the Jersey City sequence with the culture and aesthetics of Karachi".

=== Filming and visual effects ===
Filming took place in Thailand, specifically in Bangkok and at the Studio Park and Moonstar Studio facilities, with Obaid-Chinoy directing the episode, and Jules O'Loughlin serving as cinematographer. Pick-up shots were also filmed in Karachi. Obaid-Chinoy avoided using yellow hues or filters in the episode, a color other media uses to depict locations in South Asia, because her world "is not yellow. It is green and pink and red and orange, and that's what I want the world to experience. And when you bring authentic storytellers who are rooted from that part of the world to tell a story, you will notice a visual difference in the way the story is told." The fourth and fifth episodes are shot almost entirely outside, which worked to Obaid-Chinoy's strength as a filmmaker, given her past experience. Filming had begun by March 23, 2021, and concluded in early May 2021. Given the series' strict COVID-19 protocols, Ms. Marvel was able to obtain a waiver from the Thai government to continue filming in the country throughout April and May 2021 despite new restrictions put in place in April that suspended other film and television productions. The cast and crew of 450 people were divided into three bubbles in order for production to continue if a positive test was found in one of the bubbles.

Akhtar tried to approach his scenes between Waleed and Kamala that was "more father/daughter" rather than just performing "a bulky scene where you're just giving information that the character and people need to hear so that you can move along with the story". Knight performed much of his hand-to-hand fighting stunts, while the wirework and falls were done by his stunt double. The vehicle chase occurred over six streets in Thailand, with Obaid-Chinoy working with her second-unit director Gary Powell to create an environment of other vehicles to create "an obstacle course for Kamala and the Clandestines to run through".

Obaid-Chinoy called it "a great responsibility on my shoulders" to depict the moment at the end of the episode where Kamala goes back in time to the Partition of India because "Partition is such a monumental event in the life of anyone who has lived in the Indian subcontinent. There is so much intergenerational trauma, and it's so rarely ever talked about and almost never visualized." To depict the scene, she drew from many oral histories from that time as well as real-life photographs, working with O'Loughlin to recreate those photographs frame by frame through the conversations, the props, and the actions of the background actors. As well, Obaid-Chinoy wanted Kamala to just be herself in that moment, so she was "bearing witness to a part of her history and her life that she's only heard about". The train station was shot on location with a thousand extras, which was slightly enhanced and expanded upon with visual effects.

Reshoots for the series occurred in late 2021 and early 2022 in Atlanta, Georgia. Natasha Gerasimova, production designer for the reshoots, noted that sets had to be built in Atlanta to match material shot in Thailand, which was "incredibly challenging". This included the dhobi ghat set, which was built in a decommissioned mall in the Atlanta area and was based on a real-life dhobi ghat in Lahore, Pakistan.

Visual effects for the episode were created by Trixter, RISE, Base FX, SSVFX, Folks VFX, FuseFX, Framestore Montreal and London, Digital Domain, Instinctual, Moving Picture Company, OD Studios, Cantina Creative, and Stereo D.

=== Music ===
The following songs were featured in the episode: "Summer Nights" by Raaginder feat. Wisechild, "Indian Drummers" by Charles James Nicholas Casey, Johnny Kalsi, and Steven Guy Hellier, "Bahon Mein Aa Gori" by APM Music, "Dheemi Dheemi" by A-Zal and A Khan & Farad, "Aroh (Ever Growing)" by Universal Production Music, "Jashn Ki Shaam" by Sidhant Kapoor feat. Jatinder Singh, "Come Around (Main)" by Warner Chappell Music, "Punjabi Rockers" by Ali Kahn Band, "Sun Sun Dil Di Pukaar" by 5 Alarm Music, "Baajare Da Sitta (Yip Wong Remix)" by 5 Alarm Music, "Move With It" by Extreme Music, "Pasoori" by Shae Gill and Ali Sethi, "AAG" by Talal Qureshi feat. Naseebo Lal, "Disco Deewane" by Nazia Hassan, "Doobne De (Reprise)" by Hassan & Roshaan, "Babia" by Sajjad Ali, "Mera Laung Gawacha" by Musarrat Nazir, and "Up Inna" by Cadenza, M.I.A., and GuiltyBeatz.

== Marketing ==
A QR code was included in the episode that allowed viewers to access a free digital copy of Ms. Marvel (2015) #12, which also sees Kamala travel to Pakistan and encounter Kareem. After the episode's release, Marvel announced merchandise inspired by the episode as part of its weekly "Marvel Must Haves" promotion for each episode of the series, including a Red Dagger Funko Pop, apparel, and accessories.

== Release ==
"Seeing Red" was released on Disney+ on June 29, 2022. It was released in Pakistan as part of a special theatrical release through licenser HKC Entertainment, due to Disney+ not being available in the country at that time, on June 30, 2022 along with the third episode. The episode aired on ABC as part of The Wonderful World of Disney, along with the fifth and sixth episodes, on August 12, 2023.

== Reception ==
=== Viewership ===
According to market research company Parrot Analytics, which looks at consumer engagement in consumer research, streaming, downloads, and on social media, Ms. Marvel rose to third place among the breakout shows, which are defined as the most in-demand series that have premiered in the past 100 days. From June 25 to July 1, 2022, the show achieved 24.4 times the average series demand in the U.S., reflecting an 8% increase from the previous week. Whip Media, which tracks viewership data for the more than 21 million worldwide users of its TV Time app, calculated that Ms. Marvel was the fifth most-streamed original series for the week ending July 3, 2022. From July 2 to July 8, 2022, Parrot Analytics reported that it achieved 26.1 times the average series demand in the U.S., marking a 6% increase from the previous week.

=== Critical response ===
The review aggregator website Rotten Tomatoes reports a 100% approval rating with an average rating of 7.80/10, based on 19 reviews. The site's critical consensus reads, "Some of Ms. Marvel's uniqueness goes on the back burner in an episode that adheres more closely to the MCU formula, but it executes the tropes expertly and with a thrilling cliffhanger to boot."

Siddhant Adlakha of Vulture gave the episode four out of five stars, praising the characters. Arezou Amin at Collider gave the episode a B+, complimenting the cliffhanger, but criticizing "the prolonged chase scene" for feeling "repetitive" following previous superhero shows. Emma Fraser, writing for IGN, gave the episode nine out of ten, describing the "internal and external conflicts" between the three generations as "powerful", and arguing the "unresolved issues" between them "add to the emotional weight". Akhtar, a prominent Bollywood figure, drew strong acclaim for his appearance in the episode, and the representation it meant for South Asians.
