= Time and Again (Ms. Marvel) =

- Ms. Marvel episode
- Promotional poster
- Episode no.: Episode 5
- Directed by: Sharmeen Obaid-Chinoy
- Written by: Fatimah Asghar
- Cinematography by: Jules O'Loughlin
- Editing by: Nona Khodai
- Original release date: July 6, 2022
- Running time: 41 minutes

Cast
- Vardah Aziz as Zainab; Asfandyar Khan as Owais; Zion Usman as young Sana; Shyam Annabathula as Rohan; Bilal Dar as the voice of Rohan

Episode chronology
| ← Previous "Seeing Red" | Next → "No Normal" |

"Time and Again" is the fifth episode of the American television miniseries Ms. Marvel, based on Marvel Comics featuring the character Ms. Marvel. It follows Kamala Khan, who time-travels from the present to 1947, and her great-grandmother Aisha before and during the partition of India. The episode is set in the Marvel Cinematic Universe (MCU), sharing continuity with the films of the franchise. It was written by Fatimah Asghar and directed by Sharmeen Obaid-Chinoy.

Iman Vellani stars as Kamala Khan, alongside Matt Lintz, Zenobia Shroff, Rish Shah, Samina Ahmad, Fawad Khan, Nimra Bucha, Mehwish Hayat, Adaku Ononogbo, and Aramis Knight. Obaid-Chinoy joined the series by September 2020 to direct two episodes.

"Time and Again" was released on Disney+ on July 6, 2022.

== Plot ==
In India, 1942, Aisha takes refuge in a village, where Hasan, an Indian independence activist, offers her food and shelter. They fall in love and have a child, Sana. Five years later in 1947, Aisha's former friend Najma finds Aisha and orders her to retrieve the latter's bangle. Aisha leaves it with Sana and attempts to flee to the new nation of Pakistan with her family during the partition of India but Najma finds and stabs her. Hasan and Sana are separated in the chaos. Aisha's great-granddaughter Kamala Khan appears from 2025 and is able to interact with Aisha, who asks her to guide Sana before dying. Conjuring a projection of stars to lead Sana to her father, Khan realizes she was the one destined to reunite them.

Returning to the present, Kamala finds that Najma's strike has opened the Veil of the Noor dimension, which separates it from Earth, but it vaporizes anyone who interacts with it. Najma transfers her power to her son Kamran before sacrificing herself to close the Veil. An older Sana and her daughter Muneeba find Kamala, and the latter accepts her daughter's powers. Meanwhile, Kamran seeks refuge with Khan's best friend Bruno Carrelli. After being attacked by a Department of Damage Control drone, Kamran destroys it, but the ensuing explosion obliterates the store below them.

== Production ==
=== Development ===
By August 2019, Marvel Studios had begun development on a Ms. Marvel television series for the streaming service Disney+. In September 2020, Sharmeen Obaid-Chinoy was hired to direct three episodes, ultimately directing two episodes, including the fifth. Executive producers include Marvel Studios' Kevin Feige, Louis D'Esposito, Victoria Alonso, and Brad Winderbaum, in addition to Kamala Khan co-creator Sana Amanat, lead directors Adil El Arbi and Bilall Fallah, and head writer Bisha K. Ali. The fifth episode, titled "Time and Again", was written by Fatimah Asghar.

=== Writing ===
Ali revealed that more material regarding the Clandestines, Noor dimension, and the Red Daggers had been created that was unable to be included in the series because of the COVID-19 pandemic and other time constraints. She explained that the Noor dimension was never going to subsume another universe, with the ending an "emotional climax" between Najma, who was "a different kind of mother", and Kamala, who was "representing her kind of family", with Kamala "coming into her fight style" of approaching defensively first to deescalate and learning how to "deal with these difficult situations".

=== Casting ===
The episode stars Iman Vellani as Kamala Khan, Matt Lintz as Bruno Carrelli, Zenobia Shroff as Muneeba Khan, Rish Shah as Kamran, Samina Ahmad as Sana, Fawad Khan as Hasan, Nimra Bucha as Najma, Mehwish Hayat as Aisha, Adaku Ononogbo as Fariha, and Aramis Knight as Kareem / Red Dagger. Also appearing are Vardah Aziz as Zainab, Asfandyar Khan as Owais, Zion Usman as young Sana, Shyam Annabathula as Rohan, and Bilal Dar as the voice of Rohan.

=== Design ===
External videos
- Marvel Studios' Ms. Marvel: End Credits Main On End Title Sequence Episode 5 presents the episode's main-on-end title sequence, YouTube video from Perception's channel

The series' main-on-end title sequence was designed by Perception who were given visuals by Marvel Studios of Karachi to develop the sequence. Perception designed the murals, "combining elements from the Jersey City sequence with the culture and aesthetics of Karachi".

=== Filming and visual effects ===
Filming took place in Thailand, specifically in Bangkok and at the Studio Park and Moonstar Studio facilities, with Obaid-Chinoy directing the episode, and Jules O'Loughlin serving as cinematographer. Pick-up shots were also filmed in Karachi, along with studio work in Atlanta, Georgia, at Trilith Studios, Blackhall Studios, and Areu Brothers Studios. The fourth and fifth episodes are shot almost entirely outside, which worked to Obaid-Chinoy's strength as a filmmaker, given her past experience. Filming had begun by March 23, 2021, and concluded in early May 2021. Given the series' strict COVID-19 protocols, Ms. Marvel was able to obtain a waiver from the Thai government to continue filming in the country throughout April and May 2021 despite new restrictions put in place in April that suspended other film and television productions. The cast and crew of 450 people were divided into three bubbles in order for production to continue if a positive test was found in one of the bubbles.

Reshoots for the series occurred in late 2021 and early 2022 in Atlanta. Natasha Gerasimova, production designer for the reshoots, noted that sets had to be built in Atlanta to match material shot in Thailand, which was "incredibly challenging". This included the Dhobi ghat set, first seen in the previous episode, which was built in a decommissioned mall in the Atlanta area, and the train yard set for additional material with Hasan and young Sana. That set was built in a train yard and a train museum in Atlanta.

Visual effects for the episode were created by FuseFX, Digital Domain, Base FX, Folks VFX, OD Studios, Instinctual, RISE, Cantina Creative, and SSVFX. FuseFX worked on the sequence of the Clandestine attempting to enter the Veil. Though ultimately different, FuseFX noted the similarities with the effect to Terrigenesis, which the company had created the visual effects for on the Marvel Television series Agents of S.H.I.E.L.D.

=== Music ===
Composer Laura Karpman added an eight-voice choir of South Asian singers singing partially in Urdu to her score for this episode, in addition to the 70-piece orchestra and South Asian sounds she regularly used for the rest of the series. Describing the recording session with the choir, Karpman said a group of people "came up with the choir sound" from the music and themes she came with, adding, "Some unbelievably extraordinary things happened in that session. It was lightning in a bottle, not only having to come up with quick ideas based on what was happening in the room, but also what people threw back at me."

The following songs were featured in the episode: "Tu Mera Chand" by Suraiya and Shyam, "Tu Jhoom" by Abida Parveen and Naseebo Lal, "Anguish And Despair" by John Harbury, and "Aaja Ri Nindiya" by Noor Jehan.

== Marketing ==
A QR code was included in the episode that allowed viewers to access a free digital copy of Ms. Marvel (2014) #19. After the episode's release, Marvel announced merchandise inspired by the episode as part of its weekly "Marvel Must Haves" promotion for each episode of the series, including a Ms. Marvel doll, apparel, and accessories.

== Release ==
"Time and Again" was released on Disney+ on July 6, 2022. It was released in Pakistan as part of a special theatrical release through licenser HKC Entertainment, due to Disney+ not being available in the country at that time, on July 14, 2022 along with the sixth episode. The episode aired on ABC as part of The Wonderful World of Disney, along with the fourth and sixth episodes, on August 12, 2023.

== Reception ==
=== Viewership ===
According to market research company Parrot Analytics, which looks at consumer engagement in consumer research, streaming, downloads, and on social media, Ms. Marvel climbed to No. 9 on the digital originals chart with 27.9 times average demand, reflecting a 5.66% rise in demand expressions from July 9 to July 15, 2022. Whip Media, which tracks viewership data for the more than 21 million worldwide users of its TV Time app, calculated that Ms. Marvel was the fifth most-streamed original series for the week ending July 10, 2022. Nielsen Media Research, which records streaming viewership on U.S. television screens, reported that Ms. Marvel was the seventh-most streamed original series in the U.S. for the week of July 4–10 with 295 million minutes watched.

=== Critical response ===
The review aggregator website Rotten Tomatoes reports a 95% approval rating with an average rating of 7.60/10, based on 19 reviews. The site's critical consensus reads, "'Time and Again' is charged with filling narrative gaps as efficiently as possible and largely succeeds, entertainingly relaying exposition without halting Ms. Marvel's momentum."

Arezou Amin at Collider gave the episode an "A+", complimenting the directors, saying it was "arguably the strongest and best-paced episode to date". Emma Fraser, writing for IGN, gave the episode a 7 out of 10, highlighting the "interactions between the different generations of Kamala's family", adding, "the scenes between mothers and daughters pack an emotional punch".

=== Accolades ===
Karpman was nominated for Outstanding Music Composition For A Limited Or Anthology Series, Movie Or Special (Original Dramatic Score) at the 75th Primetime Creative Arts Emmy Awards for her work on the episode.
