= Damage (1992 film) =

Film by Louis Malle

- Theatrical release poster
- Directed by: Louis Malle
- Screenplay by: David Hare
- Based on: Damage by Josephine Hart
- Produced by: Louis Malle
- Starring: Jeremy Irons; Juliette Binoche; Miranda Richardson; Rupert Graves; Ian Bannen; Leslie Caron
- Cinematography: Peter Biziou
- Edited by: John Bloom
- Music by: Zbigniew Preisner
- Production companies: Skreba Films; Nouvelles Éditions de Films; Le Studio Canal+; Channel Four Films; The European Co-Production Fund; Canal+
- Distributed by: Pyramide Distribution (France); Majestic Films International; Entertainment Film Distributors (United Kingdom)
- Release dates: 9 December 1992 (France); 5 February 1993 (United Kingdom)
- Running time: 111 minutes
- Countries: United Kingdom; France
- Languages: English; French
- Budget: £6.6 million
- Box office: $31 million

Damage is a 1992 romantic psychological drama film directed and produced by Louis Malle and starring Jeremy Irons, Juliette Binoche, Miranda Richardson, Rupert Graves, and Ian Bannen. Adapted by David Hare from the 1991 novel Damage by Josephine Hart, the film is about a British politician (Irons) who has a sexual relationship with his son's fiancée and becomes increasingly obsessed with her. Richardson was nominated for an Academy Award for Best Supporting Actress and won a BAFTA Award for Best Actress in a Supporting Role for her performance as the aggrieved wife of the film's main character.

== Plot ==
Dr. Stephen Fleming, a physician who has entered politics and became a minister, lives in London with wife Ingrid and daughter Sally. Their adult son, Martyn, a young journalist, lives elsewhere in London. At a reception, Stephen meets a young woman, Anna Barton, the daughter of a British diplomat and a four-times-married Frenchwoman. Anna introduces herself as a close friend of Martyn's; she and Stephen are instantly attracted to each other. Some time later, Martyn brings Anna to meet his parents at their elegant townhouse and reveals they are romantically involved. The sexual tension between Stephen and Anna is apparent, although Martyn and Ingrid seem unaware.

After Anna calls his office, Stephen goes to her flat, where they have sex. The following day, Martyn is promoted and Ingrid arranges a celebratory dinner. There, Ingrid seems suspicious and interrogates Anna about her childhood. Anna says her brother, a year older, committed suicide over "love" when he was 16. After dinner, Martyn drives Anna home and Stephen follows them. Once Martyn leaves, Stephen enters and tells Anna how much he "wanted to touch her during dinner", leading to them having sex again. Anna describes her brother's death, after he had expressed incestuous desire, saying "he wanted me all to himself and not to grow up." She says that damaged people are dangerous, and that she hates possessiveness.

Stephen's obsession with Anna deepens; on a whim, he leaves a conference in Brussels to go to Paris, where Anna is spending the weekend with Martyn. While Martyn sleeps, Stephen and Anna have sex in a doorway. Afterwards, Stephen moves in opposite Anna and Martyn, spying on them; he now wants to be with Anna permanently, even if it destroys his family. Anna dissuades him, assuring him that, as long as she is with Martyn he will always have access to her. Visiting Anna's home, Stephen finds Peter Wetzler, her former lover. A jealous Stephen assumes Anna is cheating and, when Peter leaves, confronts her. Anna denies it and recounts that, when she witnessed her brother's suicide, she had fled to Peter and slept with him as a reaction.

The Flemings visit Edward Lloyd, Ingrid's father and Stephen's political mentor, to celebrate her birthday. Martyn announces that Anna has accepted his proposal of marriage, which visibly disturbs Stephen. That night, Sally observes him leaving Anna's room. An anxious Stephen lies about it, telling Sally he was talking to Anna about the marriage because Ingrid was upset. Later, the Flemings have lunch with Anna's mother, Elizabeth, who disparages the marriage, saying that Martyn doesn't seem like Anna's "usual type" but noting how closely he resembles Anna's dead brother. Elizabeth notices the strained behavior between Anna and Stephen. She deduces the affair and warns Stephen to end it.

Stephen initially complies and ends the relationship. He tries to confess to Martyn and Ingrid, separately, but in the end does not do it. He phones Anna, but hangs up when Martyn answers. Anna sends a key to Stephen's office, with the address of a flat where they can meet. She tells Stephen that she could not marry Martyn without being with him. They meet at the flat and begin another tryst, but Martyn—having discovered the flat by chance—finds them in bed. Stunned, he accidentally falls over a railing to his death. A devastated Stephen runs down the stairs naked and clutches his body, while Anna silently leaves.

Stephen's affair is exposed and becomes a media frenzy. An anguished Ingrid questions whether he had ever loved her and tells him she wishes they had never met. Stephen resigns his government position. Meeting Anna's mother, he discovers Anna is staying with her, but he and Anna are silent in their last meeting. Stephen, leaving his wife and daughter, retires to a rented room in a southern European town. In narration, he reveals that he saw Anna only once more, in passing at an airport, and that she had a child with Peter. Stephen stares at a huge blowup on his wall of a photo Martyn gave him of Stephen, Anna, and Martyn together. He ends with a calm note: "She was no different from anyone else."

== Cast ==
- Jeremy Irons as Dr. Stephen Fleming
- Juliette Binoche as Anna Barton
- Miranda Richardson as Ingrid Fleming, Stephen's wife
- Rupert Graves as Martyn Fleming, Stephen and Ingrid's son
- Ian Bannen as Edward Lloyd
- Peter Stormare as Peter Wetzler
- Gemma Clarke as Sally Fleming, Stephen and Ingrid's daughter
- Leslie Caron as Elizabeth Prideaux
- Julian Fellowes as Donald Lyndsay, MP
- Tony Doyle as Prime Minister
- Ray Gravell as Dr. Fleming's chauffeur
- Susan Engel as Miss Snow
- David Thewlis as Detective
- Benjamin Whitrow as Civil Servant

== Reception ==
=== Critical reception ===
Damage received many favorable reviews. On the review aggregator website Rotten Tomatoes, 81% of 26 critics' reviews are positive, with an average rating of 6.9/10. On Metacritic the film has a score of 71 out of 100 based on reviews from 28 critics, which indicates "generally favorable reviews".

Gene Siskel considered it one of the year's best films upon its release, commenting that it is "written smart, written with a topicality, so the characters seem credible". He went on to say that "Damage is a real special film". Roger Ebert described it as "one of the most compelling films [he'd] ever seen" and gave it 4 out of 4 stars.

Kenneth Turan, in a review for the Los Angeles Times, had much praise for the film, and for the performances of Irons, Binoche, and Richardson; writing: "working together with great seriousness of purpose and a considerable amount of skill, this team has turned Damage into high-class entertainment, carefully controlled, beautifully mounted and played with total conviction. Its lurid soul may have more in common with Jackie Collins than Jane Austen, but its passionate nature and convincing performances can't help but draw you in."

Peter Travers of Rolling Stone praised Malle's direction of a "faithful film version" of Hart's original novel. Of the cast, Travers was most favourable toward Richardson's portrayal of Ingrid: "Richardson is extraordinary; it's a brave, award-caliber performance."

Todd McCarthy's review for Variety was somewhat more mixed, stating that "Damage is a cold, brittle film about raging, traumatic emotions. Unjustly famous before its release for its hardly extraordinary erotic content, this very British-feeling drama from veteran French director Louis Malle proves both compelling and borderline risible, wrenching and yet emotionally pinched, and reps a solid entry for serious art-house audiences worldwide. But more mainstream Yank viewers led by publicity to expect a hot or romantic time will be in for a dry two hours."

In a mixed review for Empire magazine, Matt Mueller gave the film 3 out of 5 stars, while leveling a few criticisms: "Walking a precarious line between stark, penetrating drama and pretentious twaddle, Louis Malle's terribly British vision of erotic obsession, adapted from Josephine Hart's bestseller, is alternately compelling and risible, hypnotic and remote." He praised Richardson, in particular for a scene near the end of the film: "In that single scene, Damage achieves a level of gut-wrenching emotional intensity that had previously been absent."

=== Box office ===
The film was released in the United States on 23 December 1992 and grossed $140,777 in four theatres in its first five days. It went on to gross $7,532,911 in the US and Canada. The film grossed £1,908,050 in the United Kingdom. Outside of the United States it grossed over $23 million, for a worldwide total of over $31 million.

=== Awards and nominations ===
Award	Category	Nominee(s)	Result
Academy Awards	Best Supporting Actress	Miranda Richardson	Nominated
British Academy Film Awards	Best Actress in a Supporting Role	Miranda Richardson	Won
César Awards	Best Actress	Juliette Binoche	Nominated
Golden Globe Awards	Best Supporting Actress – Motion Picture	Miranda Richardson	Nominated
London Film Critics Circle Awards	British Actress of the Year	Miranda Richardson	Won
Los Angeles Film Critics Association Awards	Best Supporting Actress	Miranda Richardson	Runner-up
Los Angeles Film Critics Association Awards	Best Music Score	Zbigniew Preisner	Won
National Society of Film Critics Awards	Best Supporting Actress	Miranda Richardson	2nd Place
New York Film Critics Circle Awards	Best Supporting Actress	Miranda Richardson	Won
Sant Jordi Awards	Best Foreign Actor	Jeremy Irons	Won
Sant Jordi Awards	Best Foreign Actress	Juliette Binoche	Won

== Netflix adaptation ==
In March 2022, it was announced that a second adaptation of Damage was set to be developed for Netflix in the form of an original four-part limited series. It is produced by France's Gaumont and Moonage Pictures in the UK. It has been confirmed that the cast will include Richard Armitage as William (originally Stephen), Charlie Murphy as Anna, Indira Varma as Ingrid, and Rish Shah as Jay (originally Martyn), while Pippa Bennett-Warner will also feature in cast. The series will be written by Morgan Lloyd-Malcolm and Benji Walters, with Glenn Leyburn and Lisa Barros D'Sa directing. Matthew Read, Frith Triplady and Alison Jackson will serve as executive producers. The miniseries, titled Obsession, was released on 13 April 2023 and received universally negative reviews from critics and audiences.
