= Josephine Hart =

Irish writer (1942–2011)

Josephine Hart (1 March 1942 – 2 June 2011) was an Irish writer, theatrical producer, and television presenter, who lived in London, England. She is known for her novels Damage (1991) and Sin (1992), and for founding The Poetry Hour at the British Library, which continues to be held monthly. The Josephine Hart Poetry Prize is awarded by the Josephine Hart Foundation, which was founded by her husband Maurice Saatchi in her honour.

== Early life and education ==
Josephine Hart was born on 1 March 1942 at Mullingar, County Westmeath and she attended St. Louis Convent School at Carrickmacross, County Monaghan, where she was encouraged by the nuns to recite verse at Irish festivals. By the age of 12, she was able to recite Shakespeare's sonnets, and poems by W. B. Yeats, T. S. Eliot, and W. H. Auden.

She had three siblings who all died in various ways, when she was aged between 6 and 17.

She moved to London in 1964, and attended acting classes at the Guildhall School of Music and Drama at night while working in the telesales department of Thomson Newspapers.

== Career ==
Hart was appointed director of Haymarket Publishing and launched several trade magazines during her time there.

=== Poetry readings ===
She organised a public poetry reading for the first time in 1987, at a gallery in Cork Street in the West End of London, at which actor Gary Bond read poetry by Auden.

In 1993 she presented the inaugural T. S. Eliot Prize to Ciaran Carson, upon request by Eliot's widow Valerie. She read Eliot's favourite poem, "Eyes That Last I Saw In Tears", at the event.

In 2004, she organised poetry readings at the British Library. Hart was a founder of Gallery Poets in the mid-1980s, which was later renamed Josephine Hart Poetry Hour, which is held monthly.

=== Plays and television ===
Hart produced several West End plays, including The House of Bernarda Alba by Federico García Lorca.

She appeared on television as the presenter for the Thames TV series Books by My Bedside.

=== Fiction ===
Hart wrote the novel Damage (published in 1991), in six weeks. The main character is a government minister who becomes obsessed with his son's girlfriend. The book, which was translated into around 30 languages, was the basis for the 1992 film of the same name, directed by Louis Malle and starring Jeremy Irons, Juliette Binoche, and Rupert Graves. The novel also formed the basis for the Netflix miniseries Obsession which premiered in 2023.

She also wrote Sin, published in 1992. This novel was about a woman who seduces her adopted sister's husband.

== Personal life ==
Hart first married publisher Paul Buckley, with whom she had a son.

She later married Maurice Saatchi, who had briefly been her boss at Haymarket Publishing, with whom she had one son, Edward Saatchi. Maurice was granted a peerage and became Baron Saatchi and as a result, she was entitled to the title Lady Saatchi. She was also known as Baroness Saatchi.

== Recognition ==
A photograph of Hart taken by British photographer Trevor Leighton in 1992 is held by the National Portrait Gallery in London.

Her production of The House of Bernarda Alba by Federico García Lorca won the Evening Standard Award.

== Death and legacy ==
Lady Saatchi died, aged 69, from primary peritoneal cancer on 2 June 2011.

Her papers are housed at the Howard Gotlieb Archival Research Center at Boston University.

Interest in Hart's poetry is maintained by the Josephine Hart Poetry Foundation, a registered charity under English law, which was established by her husband Maurice Saatchi. Its purpose is "the advancement of arts, culture and education, with a particular focus on poetry, literature, and dramatic performance".

The foundation supports The Poetry Hour repertory company, which includes actors Eileen Atkins, Adrian Dunbar, Freddie Fox, Lily James, and Dominic West, all alumni of the Guildhall School of Music & Drama, and many others. They present events at which poetry by the great classic poets favoured by Hart is read by some of the members. This is a continuation of her Gallery Poets (founded mid-1980s), which was later renamed Josephine Hart Poetry Hour.

The foundation also awards the Josephine Hart Poetry Prize.

== Books ==
- —— (1991). Damage. Vintage Books.
- —— (1992). Sin. Vintage Books.
- —— (1995). Oblivion. Vintage Books.
- —— (1998). The Stillest Day. Chatto & Windus.
- —— (2001). The Reconstructionist. Chatto & Windus.
- —— (2008). Catching Life by the Throat: Poems from Eight Great Poets. W. W. Norton.
- —— (2009). The Truth About Love. Virago.
