= Obsession (2023 TV series) =

British television series

- Genre: Erotic thriller
- Based on: Damage by Josephine Hart
- Screenplay by: Morgan Lloyd Malcolm; Benji Walters
- Directed by: Glenn Leyburn; Lisa Barros D'Sa
- Starring: Richard Armitage; Charlie Murphy; Indira Varma; Rish Shah; Sonera Angel; Anil Goutam; Pippa Bennett-Warner; Marion Bailey
- Country of origin: United Kingdom
- Original language: English
- No. of series: 1
- No. of episodes: 4

Production
- Executive producers: Matthew Read; Frith Triplady; Alison Jackson
- Producer: Gina Carter
- Running time: 33–43 minutes
- Production companies: Gaumont UK; Moonage Productions

Original release
- Network: Netflix
- Release: 13 April 2023

Obsession is a British erotic thriller television miniseries co-written by Morgan Lloyd Malcolm and Benji Walters, based on the novel Damage (1991) by Josephine Hart. The series stars Richard Armitage, Charlie Murphy, Indira Varma and Rish Shah. It was released on Netflix on 13 April 2023.

== Synopsis ==
William (Richard Armitage) is a surgeon who begins an affair with his son Jay's (Rish Shah) fiancée Anna (Charlie Murphy). William soon becomes obsessed with Anna, which threatens his career and life.

== Cast ==
- Richard Armitage as William Farrow
- Charlie Murphy as Anna Barton
- Indira Varma as Ingrid Farrow
- Rish Shah as Jay Farrow
- Sonera Angel as Sally Farrow
- Pippa Bennett-Warner as Peggy Graham
- Anil Goutam as Edward
- Marion Bailey as Elizabeth Barton

== Episodes ==
No.	Title	Directed by	Written by	Original release date
1	"Episode 1"	Glenn Leyburn & Lisa Barros D'Sa	Morgan Lloyd Malcolm	April 13, 2023
2	"Episode 2"	Glenn Leyburn & Lisa Barros D'Sa	Morgan Lloyd Malcolm & Benji Walters	April 13, 2023
3	"Episode 3"	Glenn Leyburn & Lisa Barros D'Sa	Morgan Lloyd Malcolm & Benji Walters	April 13, 2023
4	"Episode 4"	Glenn Leyburn & Lisa Barros D'Sa	Morgan Lloyd Malcolm & Benji Walters	April 13, 2023

== Production ==
The series is produced by Gaumont and Moonage Productions. Gina Carter is producer with Moonage’s Matthew Read and Frith Triplady, and Gaumont's Alison Jackson as executive producers. Armitage, Varma, Murphy and Shah were cast in spring 2022 when the production had the working title Damage.

It was co-written by Morgan Lloyd Malcolm and Benji Walters and based on the book Damage by Josephine Hart. The novel was adapted into the 1992 film Damage starring Juliette Binoche, Miranda Richardson and Jeremy Irons. Richardson's performance garnered her the BAFTA Award for Best Actress in a Supporting Role. Glenn Leyburn and Lisa Barros D'Sa were directors on the series. Filming locations included a set at Twickenham Film Studios.

The four-part series has been described as an ‘erotic thriller’. Discussing the sex scenes within the project Lloyd Malcolm told Zoe Williams of The Guardian that “The book is so particular about the kind of sex they’re having and the way they do it and how that feeds into their relationship.” She added that “it has to be quite a vanilla version of kink, because it’s mainstream TV” but it “was really important to me to not be saying anything like: ‘BDSM sex is bad sex,’”

== Broadcast ==
The series began streaming on Netflix on Thursday April 13, 2023.

== Reception ==
The series was met with negative reviews from TV critics and audiences.
