= Do Revenge =

2022 film by Jennifer Kaytin Robinson

- Release poster
- Directed by: Jennifer Kaytin Robinson
- Written by: Celeste Ballard; Jennifer Kaytin Robinson
- Produced by: Anthony Bregman; Peter Cron; Jennifer Kaytin Robinson
- Starring: Camila Mendes; Maya Hawke
- Cinematography: Brian Burgoyne
- Edited by: David Clark; Lori Ball
- Music by: Este Haim; Amanda Yamate
- Production companies: Likely Story; Little Darlings
- Distributed by: Netflix
- Release date: September 16, 2022
- Running time: 119 minutes
- Country: United States
- Language: English
- Budget: $10 million

Do Revenge is a 2022 American teen black comedy film directed by Jennifer Kaytin Robinson, who co-wrote the screenplay with Celeste Ballard. It stars Camila Mendes, Maya Hawke, Austin Abrams, Talia Ryder, Rish Shah, and Sarah Michelle Gellar, and it is loosely inspired by Patricia Highsmith's novel Strangers on a Train and Alfred Hitchcock's film adaptation of it (1951). It was released on Netflix on September 16, 2022, and received generally positive reviews from critics.

Robinson pays homage to several 1990s high school films and other teen classics such as Heathers (1989), Jawbreaker (1999), and Mean Girls (2004).

== Plot ==
Drea is a popular student attending Rosehill Country Day High School, an elite private school in Miami, on a scholarship. A "conniving, selfish sociopath" who uses people to get what she wants, Drea later becomes a social outcast after an intimate video she sent to her equally popular boyfriend, Max, is leaked online. Max claims he was hacked, but Drea blames Max for the video's release and punches him in the face, ultimately leading to their break up, all of Drea's friends to abandon her, and destroying her reputation. As a result, the headmaster places her on behavioral probation and warns that if she has any more problems with Max, she will remove her scholarship and expel Drea from Rosehill.

That summer, Drea works at a tennis camp where she meets Eleanor, a shy tomboy from a wealthy background who is transferring to Rosehill in September. Eleanor tells Drea about also becoming an outcast when a false rumor spread that she forcibly kissed Carissa, another Rosehill student, at a summer camp years earlier.

Upon seeing their tormentors thrive while they suffer in silence, Drea and Eleanor realize they will never get justice on their own and plan to exact revenge on each other's enemy: Drea on Carissa and Eleanor on Max. After a makeover, Eleanor slowly infiltrates Drea's old clique of popular students, while Drea tries to get close to Carissa by working at the school farm, also befriending Russ, a slightly introvert student and Carissa's friend.

Eleanor is invited to a party thrown by Max, where she discovers he is cheating on his new girlfriend, Tara – Drea's former best friend. Drea steals Carissa's keys to the farm's locked greenhouse, finding the marijuana plants and magic mushrooms that Carissa has been growing in secret and plots to drug everyone at the school's Senior Ring Ceremony.

During the Senior Ring Ceremony, Drea places the drugs from the greenhouse in the dinner so Eleanor can steal Max's phone to obtain evidence of his cheating ways and find Drea's leaked video. She anonymously tips off the headmaster about the greenhouse, getting Carissa expelled and sent to rehab. While searching through Max's text messages, Drea and Eleanor find photos and messages from other girls at school stretching back years.

At the school's Valentine's Day assembly, Eleanor leaks Max's texts to the entire student body, but Max and Tara then pretend to be a polyamorous couple, which in turn becomes the school's latest trend. Drea is rejected from Yale, due to her declining grades and Max publishing a fabricated story about his and Drea's relationship (most likely containing false allegations about being the helpless victim of Drea assaulting him for supposedly leaking her video or lies about Drea being physically abusive towards him). Caught in an emotional downward spiral, she concocts a new plan to destroy all her popular former friends, in revenge for not helping when her video was leaked and get Max to admit that he leaked her video via, through video recording, at the upcoming Admissions Party, which can only be attended by those accepted by Ivy League schools.

Eleanor enjoys her new popularity and Drea's old friends, beginning a relationship with Max's twin sister Gabbi. When Max and his friends surprise Eleanor for her birthday, Drea crashes the party and nearly jeopardizes their revenge scheme. They fight about Eleanor befriending the popular group after they all abandoned and ostracized Drea when Eleanor asserts that there is no evidence that Max leaked Drea's video. Gabbi overhears this conversation and breaks up with Eleanor for choosing Max over Drea.

Learning someone sabotaged her car at tennis camp, Drea, suspicious of Eleanor and seeking dirt on her, visits Carissa at the rehab facility. Carissa reveals that Eleanor is actually "Nosey" Nora Cutler, the girl at summer camp whom Drea spread the false rumor about and outed as a lesbian; an event she had selfishly forgotten, which prompted Eleanor to change her name and undergo a rhinoplasty. Drea confronts Eleanor, who reveals she had been playing her all along, aiming to cause the same pain she endured from the rumor. Eleanor threatens to frame Drea's mother, a nurse, for drug possession if she refuses to expose her old friends at the Admissions Party. Eleanor T-bones Drea's car, sending her to the hospital, to create a sob story that earns Drea access to the Admissions Party, and tells Russ about Drea's involvement in framing Carissa for drug possession and Max's leaked text messages. Russ confronts Drea at the hospital and demands that she turns herself in. When Drea refuses, he calls her out for being selfish and ends their budding relationship.

During the party, Eleanor pressures Drea to take ketamine with Max and friends, but Drea reveals her true identity as "Nosey Nora" to the rest of the group, but immediately regrets it and apologizes to Eleanor, who in turn apologizes to her. Their emotional reconciliation is interrupted when Max appears, having learned of their plot against him. He plans to expose them and confesses to releasing Drea's video, as he found her selfish behavior a risk to his own sociopathy, unaware that Eleanor is secretly filming his confession. The girls quickly project his confession video at the party, turning everyone, including his friends, against Max, while Tara breaks up with him and his reputation is tarnished permanently. As a result, Max is expelled and his spot at Yale is offered to Drea, who rejects it. Opening themselves up towards a new beginning, Drea and Eleanor decide to skip graduation and drive off on the freeway, celebrating their victory.

During the credits sequence, Drea apologizes to Russ and they kiss, while Eleanor reconciles with Gabbi, and Max joins a support group to address toxic masculinity.

== Cast ==
- Camila Mendes as Drea Torres
- Maya Hawke as Eleanor Levetan
- Austin Abrams as Max Broussard
- Rish Shah as Russ Dara
- Talia Ryder as Gabbi Broussard
- Ava Capri as Carissa Jones
- Jonathan Daviss as Elliot Tanners
- Maia Reficco as Montana Ruiz
- Paris Berelc as Meghan Perez
- Alisha Boe as Tara Scott
- Sophie Turner as Erica Norman
- Rachel Matthews as Allegra
- Eliza Bennett as Jessica
- Francesca Reale as Ariana
- Sarah Michelle Gellar as the Headmistress

== Production ==
=== Development and casting ===
On October 14, 2020, it was reported that Netflix was developing the film, then titled Strangers. Jennifer Kaytin Robinson co-wrote and directed the film, citing inspiration from Alfred Hitchcock's film Strangers on a Train (1951) and Taylor Swift's album Reputation (2017). In November 2020, Camila Mendes and Maya Hawke were reported to star. Additional cast members were announced in early 2021.

=== Filming ===
Principal photography was scheduled to take place in Los Angeles in early 2021, but was changed to Atlanta, Georgia, with the story taking place in Miami following a rewrite in order to accommodate Hawke's schedule, who was shooting Stranger Things, as director Robinson did not want to lose either of the main actresses. Filming initially wrapped on August 7, 2021, with later stages of production occurring in August 2022 in Miami, Florida. Much of the filming took place at Oglethorpe University in suburban Atlanta.

== Soundtrack ==
Do Revenge soundtrack
No.	Title	Writer(s)	Performer(s)	Length
1.	"For the Girls"	Hayley Kiyoko, Oliver Peterhof, Marcus Lomax, Michelle Buzz	Hayley Kiyoko	2:38
2.	"Do You Know (What It Takes)"	Robyn, Denniz Pop, Max Martin, Herbie Crichlow	Robyn	3:41
3.	"Cybah"	Syd, Lucky Daye, Michael McGregor, Brandon Shoop	Syd, Lucky Daye	4:04
4.	"Brutal"	Olivia Rodrigo, Dan Nigro	Olivia Rodrigo	2:24
5.	"The Impression That I Get"	Dicky Barrett, Joe Gittleman	The Mighty Mighty Bosstones	3:15
6.	"How's It Going to Be"	Kevin Cadogan, Stephan Jenkins	Third Eye Blind	4:13
7.	"I Eat Boys"	chloe moriondo, David Pramik, Steph Jones	Chloe Moriondo	2:43
8.	"Milionària"	Rosalía, El Guincho	Rosalía	2:18
9.	"Celebrity Skin"	Courtney Love, Eric Erlandson, Billy Corgan	Hole	2:43
10.	"Deceptacon"	Kathleen Hanna, Johanna Fateman, Sadie Benning	Le Tigre	3:05
11.	"Blondes"	Anna Hartley, Blu DeTiger, Rex DeTiger, Eskeerdo, Teddy Geiger, Julian Bunetta, Scott Harris, Jenna Andrews	Blu DeTiger	2:46
12.	"Move"	Tobi, Jessica Lee Hansell, Robin Hannibal Mølsted Braun, Alex Goose, Jon Bap, Tyler Demorest, Tavon Thompson	Tobi	3:17
13.	"Dumb Dumb"	Elie Rizk, Mazie	Mazie	2:05
14.	"So Hot You're Hurting My Feelings"	Caroline Polachek, Teddy Geiger, Dan Nigro	Caroline Polachek	3:04
15.	"Easy Going"	Kacy Hill, Jim-E Stack, Ethan Gruska	Kacy Hill	2:43
16.	"How Bizarre" (orchestral version)	Alan Jansson, Pauly Fuemana	The Symphonic Pops	3:47
17.	"Kids in America" (cover)	Ricky Wilde, Marty Wilde	Maude Latour	3:15
18.	"Pretend"	Juliana Madrid, DJ Ben Roc, Simon Oscroft, Ross Clark	Juliana Madrid	3:07
19.	"Flagpole Sitta"	Aaron Huffman, Jeff J. Lin, Sean Nelson, Evan Sult,	Harvey Danger	3:37
20.	"Silk Chiffon"	Naomi McPherson, Katie Gavin, Josette Maskin, Ian Fitchuk, Daniel Tashian	Muna, Phoebe Bridgers	3:27
21.	"Bitter Bitch"	Helen	Helen	2:17
22.	"She's All I Wanna Be"	Tate McRae, Greg Kurstin	Tate McRae	3:27
23.	"Shame Reactions"	Shelby Keller, Mia Berrin	Pom Pom Squad	1:33
24.	"Happier Than Ever"	Billie Eilish, Finneas	Billie Eilish	4:59
25.	"Dead to Me"	Chloe Adams, Matthew Lonsdale	Chloe Adams
26.	"Praise You"	Fatboy Slim, Camille Yarbrough	Fatboy Slim	5:23
27.	"Bitch"	Meredith Brooks, Shelly Peiken	Meredith Brooks, Maya Hawke (uncredited), Camila Mendes (uncredited)	4:13
28.	"Dreams"	Noel Hogan, Dolores O'Riordan	The Cranberries	4:32

== Release ==
The film was released on Netflix on September 16, 2022.

== Reception ==
On the review aggregator website Rotten Tomatoes, 86% of 84 critics' reviews are positive, with an average rating of 6.5/10. The website's consensus reads: "Do Revenge could have used a bit more bite, but Maya Hawke and Camila Mendes make this a sweet dish best served to viewers who understand that high school can be hell." Metacritic, which uses a weighted average, assigned the film a score of 66 out of 100, based on 17 critics, indicating "generally favorable" reviews.

Coleman Spilde of The Daily Beast called the film a "generation defining masterpiece", saying that "once a decade, there comes a high school comedy so stylish, so witty, and so instantly influential that it cannot be topped. Netflix's colorful new romp is that movie."; Spilde subtitled his review "Cruel Intentions", acknowledging the relationship to the 1999 film of that name and the presence of actress Sarah Michelle Gellar – who played the teen antagonist in that earlier film, tormenting the daughter of her school's headmaster, and appears as the headmaster in Do Revenge. Amy Nicholson of The New York Times gave the film a B and described it as "a playful, sharp-fanged satire that feels like the '90s teen comedy hammered into modern emojis: crown, knife, fire, winky face." Matt Zoller Seitz of RogerEbert.com gave the film 3 out of 4 stars and said, "The film manages to blend all of its influences into a distinctive movie that is fully committed to its vision of high school as a handsomely costumed, art-directed snake pit filled with sadists who get off on other people's pain and embarrassment."
