= Damage (Hart novel) =

1991 novel by Josephine Hart

- First edition
- Author: Josephine Hart
- Language: English
- Genre: Romantic suspense fiction
- Publisher: Chatto & Windus (UK); Knopf (US)
- Publication date: 1991
- Pages: 195
- ISBN: 0-449-91188-8

Damage is a 1991 novel by Josephine Hart about a British politician who, in the prime of life, causes his own downfall through an inappropriate relationship. It was adapted into a film of the same title by Louis Malle in 1992, starring Jeremy Irons and Juliette Binoche, as well as into an opera, called Damage, an Opera in Seven Meals, by Greek composer Kharálampos Goyós which premiered as part of the Athens Festival in 2008. A second screen adaptation has been released in April 2023 as a four-part limited series for Netflix, under the title Obsession.

== Plot summary ==
The first-person narrator of the novel is an unnamed medical doctor turned politician (called Dr Stephen Fleming in the Louis Malle film) whose promotion from Member of Parliament (MP) to cabinet member is imminent. Just then the MP is casually introduced to his grown-up son's enigmatic girlfriend Anna and helplessly falls for her. For as long as it lasts, Martyn, his son, has no idea that his father is having an extramarital affair with his girlfriend (and later fiancée), and Anna does not seem to mind being a young man's partner and simultaneously his father's lover and object of desire. The MP enjoys a brief period of sexual bliss, meeting Anna in various European cities and having sex with her in unlikely places. Eventually, he buys them a small flat in central London where they meet on a regular basis.

On the day before his wedding to Anna, her stepfather, whom she is close to, has a heart attack, and Martyn while looking for her, finds the address to her secret flat. He climbs up a flight of stairs to the top floor, opens the unlocked door to the apartment, and is shocked to see his father making love to his fiancée. Dazed and utterly confused, he tumbles backward, hits the low banister and falls down the stairwell. The MP runs down the stairs completely naked, finding Martyn dead, sprawled out on the ground floor. He kneels on the floor and clutches Martyn's body to him until the police arrive. In the final scene, the MP, stripped of his political office and living abroad as a recluse, sits in his solitary room staring at oversized photographs of Anna and Martyn on the wall.

== Reception ==
The novel had received a positive reception. In a review for Kirkus Reviews, it was said that "this spare, dreamlike first novel comes festooned with blurbs from the likes of Ruth Rendell and Iris Murdoch, and no wonder, for it's an unforgettable tale of sexual obsession and its calamitous consequences", while being described as "Elliptical, haunting, and altogether extraordinary."
