= India Sweets and Spices =

- Poster
- Directed by: Geeta Malik
- Written by: Geeta Malik
- Produced by: Gigi Pritzker; John Penotti; Naomi Despres; Sidney Kimmel
- Starring: Sophia Ali; Manisha Koirala; Rish Shah; Adil Hussain
- Cinematography: Shane F. Kelly
- Edited by: Kevin Hickman; Hugh Ross
- Music by: Ceiri Torjussen
- Distributed by: Bleecker Street
- Release dates: June 12, 2021 (Tribeca); November 19, 2021 (United States)
- Running time: 91 minutes
- Country: United States
- Language: English

India Sweets and Spices is a 2021 American comedy-drama film directed and written by Geeta Malik. The film had a limited theatrical release in the United States on November 19, 2021. The film stars Sophia Ali, Manisha Koirala, Rish Shah, and Adil Hussain. The film is based on Geeta Malik's own script “Dinner With Friends” that won the 2016 Academy Nicholl Fellowships in screen-writing.

== Synopsis ==
Alia Kapur comes home from UCLA to her upper-class neighborhood in suburban New Jersey for summer vacation. Back in her Ruby Hill community of Indian-Americans, Alia deals with her family's drama while meeting Varun, an Indian-American man from a much poorer background than her own. They begin to see each other secretly, but it turns out that their mothers have a history Alia never knew about.

== Cast ==
- Sophia Ali as Alia Kapur, a rebellious girl. She is a UCLA student who returns home to Ruby Hill, New Jersey.
- Manisha Koirala as Sheila Kapur, Alia's strict mother
- Adil Hussain as Dr. Ranjit Kapur, Alia's laidback father
- Deepti Gupta as Bhairavi "Bhairu" Dutta, Varun's mother. She went to Delhi University with Sheila.
- Rish Shah as Varun Dutta. Alia falls in love with him after meeting him in the India Sweets & Spices grocery store.
- Ved Sapru as Rahul Singh, Alia's friend
- Anita Kalathara as Neha Bhatia, Alia's best friend
- Priya Deva as Uma Singh, Rahul's mother who has an affair with Ranjit
- Rashmi Rustagi as Lata, the aunty who gossips at parties
- Kamran Shaikh as Kamlesh Dutta, Varun's father (Note: The RogerEbert.com review mistakened Raj Kala for playing this role.)

== Production ==
Malik drew upon her childhood experiences in Aurora, Colorado for the film. Her parents would take part in what Malik's mother described as 'Desi therapy' with others in their Indian community, where they would "eat their own food and have our own clothes on". Malik initially saw these parties as comforting but that "as I got older, I realized there was also a lot of backbiting and gossiping; there was a lot of drama behind the scenes."

India Sweets and Spices was filmed in Metro Atlanta.

== Release ==
India Sweets and Spices had its world premiere at the Tribeca Film Festival on June 12, 2021, followed by a screening at the San Diego Asian Film Festival on October 30 of the same year. The movie had a limited theatrical release in the United States starting on November 19, 2021.

== Reception ==
India Sweets and Spices has a rating of 83% on Rotten Tomatoes based on 30 reviews, with an average rating of 6.7/10. The website's critics consensus reads, "Often offering both halves of its titular flavor profiles with equal aplomb, India Sweets and Spices is a slightly uneven but uniquely savory rom-com." Lisa Kennedy of The New York Times wrote that "Without sacrificing comedic buoyancy, Malik and her ensemble make palpable a community that is vibrant and claustrophobic". Kristen Page-Kirby of The Washington Post said that "But Malik has created a world that feels very real, ably communicating its occasionally frustrating and deceptively complex contours". Kimber Myers of Los Angeles Times wrote that "Warmth and intelligence — and a strong sense of both fun and feminism — make Malik’s film worth a watch, and rising star Ali is worth keeping an eye on as well".

Roxana Hadadi of RogerEbert.com rated the film at two stars, noting that the movie followed a formula typical of "Movies about “ethnic” communities" while also stating that "Koirala and Gupta! 'India Sweets and Spices' is worth watching for their work alone." Josh Kupecki of The Austin Chronicle gave the film the same rating and opined that "Positive ethnic portrayals are always refreshing, but unfortunately, homogenization rarely has any flavor".
