= Rish Shah =

British actor (born 1997)

- Born: Rishabh Shah; 17 December 1997 (age 28); Enfield, London, England
- Education: King's College London
- Occupation: Actor
- Years active: 2017–present

Rishabh Shah (born 17 December 1997) is a British actor. He had his breakout role as Kamran in the Disney+ series Ms. Marvel (2022). He has also appeared in the short film The Long Goodbye (2020), the feature films The Sweet East (2023) and Do Revenge (2022), the Netflix thriller series Obsession (2023) and the Amazon Prime Video comedy-drama series Overcompensating (2025).

== Early life and education ==
Rish Shah was born and raised in Enfield, North London. His parents are from Mumbai and Vadodara. He attended Grange Park Primary School and then Haberdashers' Boys' School. He graduated with a Bachelor of Arts in English and Linguistics from King's College London.

== Career ==
In 2017, Shah appeared in the Merdel Theatre Company production of The Plains of Delight at Clapham Fringe Festival and the Fullscreen web series PrankMe by Hazel Hayes. In 2019, he made his television debut with guest appearances in Russell T Davies' Years and Years and the medical soap opera Doctors, both on BBC One. He also had stage roles in You're Dead, Mate at the Nutshell in Winchester and Torch Song Trilogy at the Turbine Theatre in London.

Shah appeared in Riz Ahmed's 2020 Oscar winning short film The Long Goodbye as Ahmed's younger brother. Shah took over the role of Kirin Kotecha in the ITV soap opera Emmerdale from Adam Fielding for the character's return in 2020. He was named a 2021 Brit to Watch by Variety.

Shah made his feature film debut in 2021 as Ravi in the Netflix film To All the Boys: Always and Forever and Varun Dutta in the romantic comedy film India Sweets and Spices opposite Sophia Ali.

The following year he joined the Marvel Cinematic Universe and made his debut as superpowered teen Kamran in the Disney+ series Ms. Marvel. He went on to play Russ in the Netflix comedy film Do Revenge. He starred in the Netflix limited thriller series Obsession and appeared in the Amazon film Sitting in Bars with Cake. In 2024, Shah appeared in the Netflix autobiographical drama Joy.

== Filmography ==
=== Film ===
Year	Title	Role	Notes
2020	The Long Goodbye	Karim	Short film
2021	To All the Boys: Always and Forever	Ravi	
2021	India Sweets and Spices	Varun Dutta	
2022	Do Revenge	Russ	
2023	The Sweet East	Mohammad	
2023	Sitting in Bars with Cake	Owen	
2024	Joy	Arun	
2026	The Moment	Jamie	

=== Television ===
Year	Title	Role	Notes
2019	Years and Years	Ahmed	Episode 6
2019	Doctors	Rajdeep Mishra	Episode: "Failing to Stop"
2020	Casualty	Virat Dewala	Episode #34.32
2020	Emmerdale	Kirin Kotecha	5 episodes
2022	Ms. Marvel	Kamran	5 episodes (main cast)
2022	Marvel Studios: Assembled	Himself	Documentary; episode: "Assembled: The Making of Ms Marvel"
2023	Obsession	Jay Farrow	4 episodes
2025–present	Overcompensating	Miles	8 episodes

=== Web ===
Year	Title	Role	Notes
2017	PrankMe	Asif	4 episodes

== Stage ==
Year	Title	Role	Notes
2017	The Plains of Delight	Jerry	Clapham Fringe Festival
2019	You're Dead, Mate	The Man	The Nutshell, Winchester
2019	Torch Song Trilogy	Alan	Turbine Theatre, London
