= Pasoori =

2022 single by Ali Sethi & Shae Gill

Single by Ali Sethi and Shae Gill
- Language: Punjabi; Urdu
- Released: 7 February 2022
- Genre: Pakistani pop; Punjabi folk; reggaeton
- Length: 3:44
- Label: Coke Studio
- Songwriters: Ali Sethi; Fazal Abbas
- Composers: Ali Sethi; Zulfiqar Jabbar Khan

Music video
- "Pasoori" on YouTube

"Pasoori" (Punjabi: بھسوڑی, lit. 'difficulty/trouble', IPA: [pə˥.suː˥˩.ɽiː]) (Note: The Urdu title of this track is پسوڑی - pasūṛī, which is seemingly a misspelling of the actual Punjabi term بھسوڑی - bhasūṛī.) is a Punjabi and Urdu-language single by Pakistani singers Ali Sethi and debutant Shae Gill. It was released on 6 February 2022 as the sixth song of season 14 (episode two) of Coke Studio Pakistan and was subsequently released on YouTube on 7 February 2022.

According to data released by Spotify in December 2022, "Pasoori" was the most-streamed Pakistani song globally as well as the most-streamed song in Pakistan in 2022. It was also the second most-searched song in the world and the most 'Hum to Search' song in the world, as per Google Trends' "Year in Search 2022" report."Pasoori" was the first Coke Studio song and the first Pakistani song to feature on Spotify's "Viral 50 - Global" chart. It was featured in episode 4 of the Disney+ miniseries Ms. Marvel as well as on the soundtrack of the off-Broadway production, Monsoon Wedding The Musical (2023), directed by Mira Nair. In August 2022, "Pasoori" became the third song in Coke Studio's 14-year history to reach 300 million views on YouTube, and on 14 October 2022, with 410 million views on YouTube, "Pasoori" became the most-watched Coke Studio music video of all time. In December 2022, "Pasoori" became the first Pakistani song to enter YouTube's Global Top Music Videos chart (week of 16–22 December). On 21 January 2023, "Pasoori" hit 500 million views on YouTube, making it the first Coke Studio music video to reach this milestone. On 7 September 2026, "Pasoori" became the first Pakistani music video to garner one billion views on YouTube.

In June 2023, a remake version of the song was released by T-Series for the Hindi film Satyaprem Ki Katha, sung by Arijit Singh and Tulsi Kumar.

== Background ==
Music producer Abdullah Siddiqui noted that the song is a mix of various cultural influences: "you get to listen to a little bit of the classical tune of a rubab along with a modern reggaetón beat." Shae Gill was discovered by composer Zulfiqar Jabbar Khan through Instagram where she regularly posted cover versions of various songs. In an interview, Gill stated: "Coke Studio producer Zulfiqar Jabbar Khan (Xulfi) found my Instagram page and checked out my singing. He liked my songs and later contacted me via direct message, saying, 'I want you to sing for Coke Studio.' The rest is history."

In addition to the lead vocalists and musicians, the music video of the song also features Pakistani social activist and Bharatanatyam exponent Sheema Kirmani. In a text message to Sethi, Kirmani shared that while conceptualizing her dance movements for the song, she "did not want to go along the line of literal depiction of words, but [instead] felt that the movements should be abstract but suggestive of the emotions contained within the song and music."

== Composition and songwriting ==
Sethi shared in an interview that the inspiration for the song came to him as he was driving from Faisalabad to Lahore and noticed a quote in Punjabi on the back of a jingle truck that said "aag lavaan teri majbooriyan nu" (transl. set fire to your worries and compulsions). He mentions that he was struck by these words: "I felt that this was such an amazing expression of the Punjabi language. This should be part of a song somehow." He describes that the words inspired him to brainstorm further to come up with lyrics that would go well with that expression and add weight to the song, and that is when he came up with "aan jaan di pasoori nu" (transl. the crisis of coming and going). Sethi has mentioned that he "wanted to write a song that felt classical but also relevant to contemporary life."

Sethi revealed that "Pasoori" took around one year to develop and that his goal was to infuse "the Turkic, Indic, Arab, Persian, and...the global placeless, ubiquitous 'beats' vibe that is also our inheritance." He noted that the folk and classical musical traditions the song draws from — including Sufi and qawwali — have centuries-long origins and therefore could not be classified as either Indian or Pakistani. Sethi has also shared that he sent the initial tune for the song on a voice note to composer Zulfiqar Jabbar Khan, and that the lyrics of the song were not finalized until about 12 hours before the recording.

"Pasoori" revolves around themes of separation and heartbreak, but also self-acceptance, self-expression, letting go of one's worries, and the transformative power of art. Sethi contends that the word "pasoori" is deliberately ambiguous and difficult to translate and that the song is about "the bittersweet-ness of unrequited love, the Wabi-Sabi in art or the strange joy one sometimes finds in melancholy, Pasoori is all this. It speaks of anguish, art, music and passion, and how all of these can be uplifting, transformative even." Sethi has shared that while writing the song, he drew from the Punjabi folk songs that he grew up listening to which allowed him to infuse the lyrics with "puns and double entendres — a nice way to slip in and subvert orthodox views without really appearing to be out beyond the veil."

== Music and style ==
"Pasoori" was conceptualized as a fusion of pop and folk music, combining "poetic tradition with global beats." Sethi has mentioned that the song blends raga and reggaeton — a sound which he describes as "ragaton" — and notes that it was designed to feel warm and familiar, asserting that "it makes one feel good." Sethi claimed that with "Pasoori," he wanted to create a song "that represents our culture but does dialogue with the world" to show that "it is possible to be local and also be global...to be completely rooted and to be completely open and free."

According to a Coke Studio press release, Sethi began writing and composing "Pasoori" at a time when Pakistani artists were barred from working across the border in India, which led to a sense of frustration and anguish. In response, Sethi stated that he "wanted to write a song that was sort of a flower bomb hurled at nationalism and heteropatriarchy...with all the fun innuendos and all this camp energy." Consistent with his musical style of challenging norms and voicing dissent, Sethi shared that his objective with "Pasoori" was to make a statement on the "free movement of ideas and melodies through a song," turning angst into art, and celebrating artistic self-expression in a world where "borders and boundaries of all sorts have become more rigid." Sethi asserted: "I might not have been able to travel to India, but I knew my music could." The YouTube description of the song reads: "Let's transcend boundaries and bridge distances through compassion, love, and identity." In its description of the song, The New Yorker stated: "'Pasoori' is ostensibly about star-crossed lovers, but it’s also an apt metaphor for the relationship between two countries in perpetual conflict whose histories and cultural touchstones are entwined."

Song producer Abdullah Siddiqui described "Pasoori" as belonging to "a groundbreaking new hybrid genre" and as "one of the most modern tracks" of Coke Studio Season 14. The song features musical instruments ranging from electronic drums and synths to acoustic guitars and the bağlama and mandolin. Within the traditional framework of South Asian ragas, the song incorporates "Turkish strings, flamenco-style claps and the four-four Latino reggaeton beats..."

On 18 August 2022, Coke Studio released an African fusion remix of "Pasoori" featuring Sethi singing a modified version of the song along with Nigerian musician Reekado Banks and Egyptian EDM Trap artist Marwan Moussa. On 8 December 2022, Sethi released an acoustic version of "Pasoori" featuring guitar work by Noah Georgeson and trumpets by Los Angeles-based musician, Jordan Katz.

In an interview with The Harvard Crimson, when asked to reflect on the viral popularity of the song, Sethi stated: "It's like some of the Punjabi limericks I learned as a kid, which were half-nonsensical, but kind of magical...They were built on themselves, and became these fabulous myths with the head of one thing and the tail of another. I think that's kind of what Pasoori is, a magical being…and there's something about the structure of it that dazzles and asks for recitation." In a 2023 interview, Sethi shared that he was surprised by the global popularity of "Pasoori," stating: "I thought it was going to be this...indie, niche thing that a bunch of my nerdy fans were gonna like. I'm just astounded by how many people around the world — particularly in India — loved it and embraced it."

== Reception ==
And it is not just in south Asia: since it was released in February, the song, which draws on traditional and modern musical influences, has gone on to become a global phenomenon and one of Pakistan’s most popular musical exports for years.

— Shah Meer Baloch of The Guardian

"Pasoori" became the fastest song in Coke Studio Season 14 to garner one million views on YouTube and had amassed 10 million views on YouTube within 10 days of its release. It went on to become the first Coke Studio song and the first Pakistani song to feature on Spotify's "Viral 50 - Global" chart. "Pasoori" also ranked at number one on Spotify India's "Viral 50" chart on 7 March 2022. On 26 April 2022, it debuted at number 161 on Spotify's Global Chart, making it the first Pakistani song to enter the streaming platform's global charts, and peaked at 109th weekly and 89th daily positions. On 4 May 2022, it climbed to the top of Spotify's "Viral 50 - Global" chart. On 7 May 2022, 90 days after its release, "Pasoori" hit 100 million views on YouTube, making it one of the most-viewed Pakistani videos on the video sharing platform. On 1 August 2022, the song reached 300 million views on YouTube, making it only the third song in the 14-year history of Coke Studio to do so. As per data released by Spotify in December 2022, "Pasoori" was the most-streamed Pakistani song globally as well as the most-streamed song in Pakistan in 2022. In December 2022, "Pasoori" became the first Pakistani song to enter YouTube's Global Top Music Videos chart (week of 16–22 December). With over one billion views on YouTube as of September 2026, "Pasoori" is currently the first Coke Studio song and the first Pakistani music video to reach this milestone.

"Pasoori" received praise for its "joyful sounds," "earworm tune," "catchy melody, lyrics...and impeccable performances by the artists," and for "the balance between modern and old school sounds." The vocal chemistry between Sethi and Gill was also met with positive feedback, with Gill's "smoky voice" being praised for pairing well with Sethi's "rich tenor." The song trended heavily on Instagram, Twitter, Facebook, and TikTok, inspiring numerous user-generated reels, dance challenges, covers, mashups, spin-offs, and fan artwork.

The production design of the music video by Hashim Ali received praise for its striking visual appeal, intricate layout, bohemian esthetics, and vibrant color palette. Ali described the set as "a communal space where artists can celebrate humanity "through not just ethnicity, but also variety in emotion, style and spirituality." Video director Kamal Khan was lauded for "celebrating communal spirit by showing different emotions, styles, and spirituality" and for sending "a message of inclusion" through each character in the video. Sethi, who conceived the idea for the video, stated: "It's a chimera: where one is many and many is one. It's like an acid trip. I really wanted to gesture at this mystical strain of South Asian artwork and philosophy, because that part of our ancestral culture can engage in a fruitful dialogue with contemporary discourse."

In its review of the song, The New Yorker stated: "The song is stealthily subversive: a traditional raga — the classical Indian framework for musical improvisation — has been laid over an infectious beat that sounds South Asian, Middle Eastern, and, improbably, reggaetón, all at once." Describing the song as a "global hit," The Guardian stated: "the song has been heralded for transcending boundaries, particularly between India and Pakistan, continuing a long tradition of culture uniting the two countries where politics always failed." Writing for The National, Mariam Nihal contended that "the track embraces unity in diversity as it features Pakistani dancer and activist Sheema Kermani performing bits of a Bharatnatyam, an Indian dance. The Turkish baglama (string instrument) features in the video while Shae Gill, who's from the Christian community, is joined by Sethi, a Muslim, as they sing in Punjabi, a language spoken in both India and Pakistan."

A cover of the song was performed by Dutch singer Emma Heesters which went viral on social media. A TikTok video of Indian and Pakistani cricket fans singing and dancing to the song outside Melbourne Cricket Ground ahead of the 2022 ICC Men's T20 World Cup game between India and Pakistan went viral in October 2022.

== T-series cover ==
"Pasoori Nu"

Remix by Arijit Singh and Tulsi Kumar

from the album Satyaprem Ki Katha
- Released: June 2023
- Recorded: 2023
- Length: 3:17
- Label: T-Series
- Composers: Rochak Kohli, Ali Sethi
- Lyricists: Gurpreet Saini, Ali Sethi

In June 2023, a T-series remake of the song titled "Pasoori Nu" was released as part of the soundtrack of the Indian film Satyaprem Ki Katha, starring Kartik Aaryan and Kiara Advani. The track was sung by Arijit Singh and Tulsi Kumar, composed by Rochak Kohli and Ali Sethi, with modified Hindi lyrics penned by Gurpreet Saini. The remake featured a new bridge and minor modifications to the chorus, with Kohli stating that "the original song was poetic and in Punjabi, we decided to simplify it and keep it in Hindi." The song received mixed to negative reviews, with some listeners criticizing it as unnecessary and unimaginative.

== Charts ==
Chart (Weekly)	Peak position
India (Billboard India)	2
United Kingdom (Asian Music Charts)	2
"—" denotes a recording that did not chart or was not released in that territory

== Credits ==
- Vocals: Ali Sethi and Shae Gill
- Song Narrative: Ali Sethi
- Written by: Ali Sethi and Fazal Abbas
- Composed by Ali Sethi and Zulfiqar Jabbar Khan
- Arranged by: Abdullah Siddiqui and Sherry Khattak
- Produced by: Abdullah Siddiqui and Zulfiqar Jabbar Khan
- Mixed by: Zulfiqar Jabbar Khan
- Production Designer and Art Director: Hashim Ali
- Performer: Sheema Kirmani
- Director: Kamal Khan

== Accolades ==
Year	Awards	Category	Recipient/ nominee	Result	Ref.
6 October 2023	Lux Style Awards	Best Song of the Year	Ali Sethi	Won	
6 October 2023	Lux Style Awards	Most Streamed Song	Ali Sethi & Shae Gill	Won	
6 October 2023	Lux Style Awards	Best Music Producer	Abdullah Siddiqui	Won	

== See also ==
- Kana Yaari
- Music of Punjab
- Music of Pakistan
