= Ali Sethi =

Pakistani-American singer and author

- علی سیٹھی
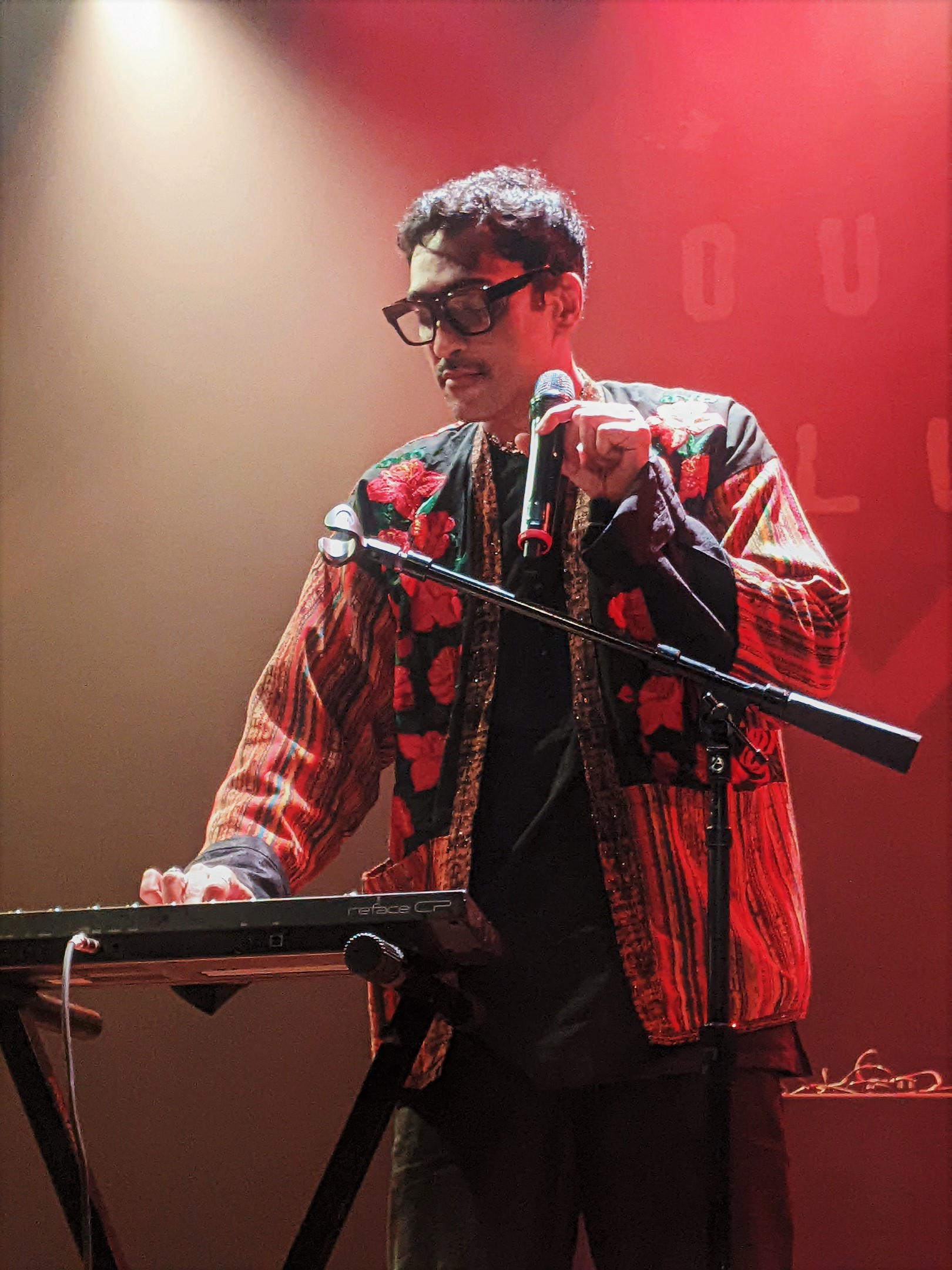
- Sethi performing at House of Blues, Chicago, January 2023
- Born: Ali Aziz Sethi; July 2, 1984 (age 42); Lahore, Punjab, Pakistan
- Citizenship: Pakistan; United States
- Education: Aitchison College; Harvard University
- Occupations: Singer; songwriter; composer; author; columnist
- Years active: 2010–present
- Parent(s): Najam Sethi; Jugnu Mohsin
- Family: Mira Sethi (sister); Moni Mohsin (aunt)
- Musical career
- Genres: Ghazal; folk; classical; contemporary; pop; Sufi
- Instruments: Vocals; keyboards; piano; harmonium
- Labels: True Brew; Mainstage Productions; Other People Records; Zubberdust Media
- Website: alisethi.info beacons.ai/alisethiofficial

Ali Aziz Sethi (Urdu/Punjabi: علی عزیز سیٹھی; pronounced [əˈliː ˈseːʈʰiː]; born July 2, 1984) is a Pakistani-American singer, songwriter, composer, and author. Born to journalists and politicians Najam Sethi and Jugnu Mohsin, Sethi rose to prominence with his debut novel, The Wish Maker (2009). Although Sethi received some musical training as a child, he did not begin to formally train in Hindustani classical music until after graduating from college. He trained under the tutelage of Ustad Naseeruddin Saami (widely considered a master of both the qawwali and khyal forms of singing) as well as under noted ghazal and classical singer Farida Khanum.

In 2012, Sethi began focusing on his musical career and made his film debut as a singer in Mira Nair's 2012 film, The Reluctant Fundamentalist, with the song "Dil Jalaane Ki Baat Karte Ho." He followed this up with numerous independent covers of popular ghazals as well as traditional Punjabi folk songs. In 2015, Sethi made his debut on Coke Studio Pakistan with the well-known Punjabi folk song "Umraan Langiyaan" for which he received significant praise, quickly establishing himself as a millennial practitioner of traditional folk and classical music. Sethi has since appeared on several seasons of Coke Studio, performing both covers and original music. His most recent single for Coke Studio – "Pasoori" (2022) – became the first Pakistani song to feature on Spotify's "Viral 50 - Global" chart, eventually climbing to the top of the chart in May 2022. With over one billion views on YouTube Music as of January 2025, "Pasoori" is currently the most watched Coke Studio music video of all time and the first Coke Studio song to reach this milestone.

Sethi is particularly associated with the ghazal format of singing and is often hailed for attempting to revive the ancient art form by experimenting with it and repositioning it as a young person's genre. He collaborates frequently with Grammy-winning music producer Noah Georgeson and has performed at Carnegie Hall, Harvard University, Brown University, Georgetown University, and the Royal Geographical Society among others. Sethi is noted for his ability to blend Hindustani classical ragas with contemporary Western arrangements and for his flair for lending new-age contours to older melodies. In his live performances, he often combines his songs with historical and cultural context, critical commentary, and etymological roots of Urdu words.

In September 2022, Sethi was included in Time magazine's Time 100 Next list and was recognized for his ability to use ancient classical ragas "to challenge and expand notions of gender, sexuality, and belonging." In September 2023, the Saxena Center for Contemporary South Asia at Brown University announced that Sethi would serve as its first Artist in Residence as a visiting scholar. According to data released by Spotify in 2022 and 2023, Sethi is among the most streamed Pakistani artists in the world.

== Early life and background ==
Ali Sethi was born on July 2, 1984, in Lahore, Pakistan to award-winning journalists and publishers Najam Sethi and Jugnu Mohsin, both of whom are also politicians. Sethi is the brother of actor and author Mira Sethi and nephew to British-Pakistani writer Moni Mohsin. In May 1999, police broke into his family home and arrested his father, Najam Sethi for allegedly making a "treasonous speech" in New Delhi, India. Sethi, then 15 years old, campaigned with his mother for his father's release. Najam Sethi was later acquitted by the Supreme Court of Pakistan and awarded Amnesty International's Journalist of the Year Award.

=== Education ===
Sethi attended the International School of Choueifat and Aitchison College in Lahore, Pakistan and describes himself as an above average student, particularly interested in art, drawing, music, and poetry. In a 2024 interview with T: The New York Times Style Magazine, Sethi shared that while he was recognized at school for his artistic and academic talents, he was also "taunted by both students and teachers for being part of a queer cohort."

Sethi attended Harvard College from 2002 to 2006, initially planning to major in economics. After taking a class on Islamic culture in contemporary societies with Ali S. Asani, Sethi became interested in the intersections of theology, politics, linguistics, and culture and eventually changed his major to South Asian Studies. While at Harvard, Sethi took creative writing and world fiction classes with Zadie Smith and Amitav Ghosh, in addition to classes on colonial and post-colonial art and Sanskrit, Bengali, and Tamil poetry. He also performed every year for Ghungroo, Harvard's largest student-run production focusing on the South Asian diaspora, in addition to serving on the features board of The Harvard Advocate. Sethi wrote his undergraduate thesis on Anarkali, wanting to explore the "articulation of Muslim identity around women."

== Writing career ==
"The Wish Maker, in Ali Sethi's mature and sure-handed prose, is an engaging family saga, an absorbing coming-of-age story, and an illuminating look at one of the world's most turbulent regions. Ali Sethi steadfastly resists the usual cliché's about both Islam and his native country. Instead, he offers a nuanced, often humorous, and always novel look at life in modern day Pakistan."
– Khaled Hosseini reviewed The Wish Maker

In 2009, Sethi published his debut novel The Wish Maker, "a semiautobiographical coming-of-age novel" which revolved around Pakistani identity and "the political history of Pakistan with three generations of characters who live in a middle-class, liberal enclave of Lahore." Sethi recalls writing the first draft of the novel in 2006 during his senior year at Harvard, a second draft while living in New York City, and the final draft in Lahore, Pakistan. He has mentioned that his goal with the novel was "to document and archive a phase in Pakistan’s history that had been extremely turbulent and had had far-reaching consequences."

The novel was published by Riverhead Hardcover and later Penguin Books and was met with widespread critical acclaim and recognition. It was ranked eighth at Vogue Top Ten Summer Books. The Wish Maker has been translated into Italian, Dutch, German, Hindi, Chinese, and Turkish. In its review of the novel, The New York Times called it "a first-rate novel", stating that "Sethi's prose evokes the comic mislocutions of Jonathan Safran Foer and the vertiginous mania of Zadie Smith." The Wall Street Journal stated, "Mr. Sethi is especially alive to the emotional contours of young love, its modes of courtship, its methods of subterfuge...Mr. Sethi's prose, always lucid, often soars to illuminate the quotidian." The Guardian praised Sethi's "sharp handling" of material and "memorably drawn" characters. The Wish Maker was long-listed for the 2011 DSC Prize for South Asian Literature, ultimately losing to H. M. Naqvi's, Home Boy. It was also shortlisted for 2010 Shakti Bhatt First Book Award.

Sethi has written essays and articles for The New York Times, The New Yorker, The Guardian, The New York Review of Books, and The Caravan. In his writings, Sethi advocates for an inclusive and syncretic Pakistan that accommodates the rights of marginal groups. He has received praise for his profiles of the writer Saadat Hasan Manto and the ghazal singer Farida Khanum. On two occasions, the Pakistani newspaper The Express Tribune censored his articles, deeming them too sensitive to be published in Pakistan.

Sethi lists Mirza Ghalib, Daagh Dehlvi, Faiz Ahmed Faiz, Leo Tolstoy, Virginia Woolf, V. S. Naipaul, Alan Hollinghurst, and Arundhati Roy as his favorite authors and literary influences.

== Musical career ==
=== Musical training and influences ===
Sethi recalls his mother signing him up for music lessons with a tutor at the age of eight, but notes that he had no interest in them: "I would prance about the room and constantly urge him to drink more chai..." He recollects that his earliest memories pertaining to music are that of listening to Noor Jehan's Punjabi songs on radio-cassette players and melancholic national songs that played on PTV. Sethi credits his mother for introducing him to traditional South Asian music at a young age and for helping him develop his singing talent: "My mother would make me sing complex songs and verses. She'd pay attention to me and that activated me."

Sethi recalls that he initially started singing qawwali and ghazals mostly to impress his parents' friends. In another interview, he recollects that "there was always music being played at home. My mother always played Iqbal Bano, Farida Khanum, Mehdi Hassan's songs at home. Even while travelling in a car, there was light-classical music being played." In an interview, he similarly narrated: "We grew up listening to qawwali and to ghazal, to folk music from Punjab and the Saraiki belt, to Pandit Bhimsen Joshi, bhajan singers – it was all part of one musical landscape." Sethi has asserted that growing up surrounded by the uniquely diverse music environment in Lahore in the late 1990s and early 2000s also shaped his musical tastes: "There was music of the Sufi shrines in the city, a very vernacular form of music...there was Bollywood music coming in, and there was the azaan...which you would hear five times a day. But at the same time there were cassettes and CDs, random bits of Western pop music, that would flood the bazaars."

Sethi has mentioned that songs composed by R. D. Burman and written by Gulzar influenced him greatly during his teenage years, claiming: "If you think about it, it is unusual as I am a child of the 90s, and not the 70s. But there was something sublime about that musical combine. Gulzar’s words were suggestive, abstract and playful, and RD's tunes were wayward, epic and phantasmagorical." Sethi lists Vishal Bhardwaj as one of his favorite composers for his musical sensibility and has stated that he admires Abida Parveen.

Sethi formally apprenticed himself to Ustad Naseeruddin Saami of the Delhi gharana in 2008 and to ghazal and classical singer Farida Khanum in 2012. Sethi has stated that from Saami, he learned "the melody patterns of raga, and how Vedic chants and Turkic and Persian melodies were fused by guilds in medieval India" and that "before the encounter with the West, South Asia had its own microtones and its own notations and its own multicultural sense of what a musical scale is. It was much more flexible than what the West imposes."

=== 2011–2017: Early career and work in Coke Studio Pakistan ===
In 2011, Sethi traveled to India to serve as an adviser on Mira Nair's 2012 political-thriller, The Reluctant Fundamentalist. At a social gathering during his visit, Sethi sang the ghazal "Dil Jalaane Ki Baat Karte Ho," originally sung by his teacher, Farida Khanum. Nair was so moved by his rendition that she urged Sethi to record the song which went on to feature on the soundtrack of the film. The song became Sethi's stepping stone into his recording career, brought him international recognition as a singer, and was named the "highlight of the album" by The Times of India.

In 2015, Sethi made his singing debut on Coke Studio Season 8 with "Umran Langiyaan," a Punjabi folk song originally sung by Asad Amanat Ali Khan. With his rendition of "Umran Langiyaan," Sethi was said to have "cemented his place as an interpreter of classics." Sethi received praise for "expertly channel[ing] some of the soaring high-register scatting that made Asad Amanat’s performances so amazing." Indian classical singer Shubha Mudgal lauded Sethi for his "delicacy of expression" and "ease and familiarity with Punjabi and the Saraiki dialect."

Sethi went on to perform on the next five seasons of Coke Studio Pakistan. His most notable songs from the series are "Aaqa" with Abida Parveen, "Tinak Dhin" with Ali Hamza and Waqar Ahsin, "Ranjish Hi Sahi," "Gulon Main Rang," and most recently, "Pasoori." Sethi stated that singing Aaqa with Abida Parveen was challenging but life-changing for him: "Her octave starts four-five notes higher than mine...I struggled because I had to sing at her pitch, and then I had to sing the high parts. It was a really acrobatic challenge for me to go there. But it worked somehow and I’m so glad it did. For me it was a great opportunity and it changed my life in many ways." Sethi sang the well-known ghazal "Ranjish Hi Sahi" as a tribute to its original singer, the legendary Mehdi Hassan. However, he asserted that his objective with the song was not to sing about lost love (as the original does) but to express hope for a more united Pakistan, stating: "The song is about the anguish and ecstasy of loss...and as the nation celebrates its 70th anniversary, we need to come together despite our differences." Sethi received praise for his emotive and melancholy vocal expression in "Ranjish Hi Sahi" and for adding his own personal touch to the classic ghazal. His rendition of "Gulon Main Rang" was described as a moving and hopeful ode to the original rendition of the ghazal by Mehdi Hassan and to Faiz Ahmad Faiz's writings on romance, revolution, and social justice.

In February 2015, Sethi released his first music video for the single "Kithay Nain Na Jori" at the Karachi Literature Festival. The video featured Sethi and starred Sania Saeed, Adnan Siddiqui, and Mira Sethi and the song was meant as a tribute to Pakistani folk singer Reshma. On February 5, 2016, Sethi released his original single "Mahi Mera" featuring farmer-turned-folk singer Jamaldin, which was critically well received. The video was directed by Umar Riaz and was shot entirely in Jamaldin's and Sethi's ancestral villages, Hussaingarh and Shergarh respectively.

In 2017, Sethi featured in the track "Aaja" with Riz Ahmed and Heems and Redinho of the Swet Shop Boys as a tribute to Qandeel Baloch. That year, Sethi also collaborated with Pakistani-American artist Shahzia Sikander and Pulitzer Prize-winning composer Du Yun on Disruption as Rapture, a multimedia work housed in the permanent collection of the Philadelphia Museum of Art. The same year, he sang the song "Chan Kithan," a reinterpretation of a Punjabi folk song. Sethi also co-produced and co-directed the music video for the song. The musical arrangement combined a traditional folk ditty from rural Punjab with electronica and indie-rock to create what Sethi described as "Punjabi Gothic music." The music video is based on a retelling of the Cinderella story which takes place in contemporary Pakistan. The song received praise for combining "the ethos of Saraiki language with urban longing" and for fusing various styles and techniques of arrangement.

In December 2017, Sethi collaborated with American dhol player Sunny Jain on a project called Resident Alien and performed renditions of seven folk songs in Joe's Pub in New York.

=== 2018–2019: Original music, collaboration with Noah Georgeson, and Harvard talks ===
Sethi recorded a romantic ballad "Yunhi Rastay Mai" for the 2018 film Saat Din Mohabbat In. Sethi collaborated with Red Baraat on the song "Kala Mukhra" (a reworking of the traditional "Gora Mukhra"). On June 28, 2018, Sethi released "Waasta" (co-written by Sethi, featuring rapper Faris Shafi), and renditions of "Dil Karda Ay" and "Agar Tum Mil Jao" for season three of music series Cornetto Pop Rock with Quratulain Balouch.

Sethi began focusing more heavily on releasing original music in 2019, announcing that year that he would be collaborating on new projects with American music producer Noah Georgeson. Sethi said, "I've admired Noah's work for years, and I'm thrilled to be working with him." Georgeson responded by saying, "Beyond my excitement in working with Ali, and his transcendent talent and voice, I'm looking forward to applying my approach to an unfamiliar tradition of music." Sethi and Georgeson released five songs together: "Chandni Raat," "Dil Ki Khair," "Khabar-e-Tahayyur-e-Ishq," "Ishq," and "Dil Lagaayein." In May 2019, both artists gave a headlining performance together at Sanders Theater for Harvard University's Arts First festival.

In 2019, Sethi's song "Umraan Langiyaan" from Coke Studio Season 8 was featured on HBO's documentary film The Case Against Adnan Syed. The same year, Sethi performed as a soloist at Carnegie Hall for Du Yun and Palestinian artist Khaled Jarrar's orchestral multimedia work Where We Lost Our Shadows which revolved around the theme of human migration. The New York Times review praised his performance for its "rawness and plaintive delicacy." Video footage of Sethi's Carnegie Hall performance was shown on two NASDAQ billboards at Times Square as part of a tribute in December 2019.

Also in 2019, Sethi presented two talks at Harvard University along with Ali S. Asani. In one of the lectures, titled The Covenant of Love, Sethi discussed the poetic tradition of Sufi music and the consciousness of Sufi poets and the evolution of Indo-Muslim Sufi thought. In the other lecture, titled The Art of the Ghazal, Sethi discussed the ghazal as a literary genre and explored mystical themes in Urdu ghazals.

=== 2020–2021: Notable performances and collaborations ===
Sethi began his Spring 2020 tour on February 16 with a performance at the Royal Geographical Society in London. In March 2020, he shared that his performances in Seattle, Chicago, San Diego, Silicon Valley, and Sacramento, California, had been postponed. The same month, when the global lockdown began due to the COVID-19 pandemic, Sethi initiated a series of virtual concerts with Indian artists on Instagram. These included musicians Rekha Bhardwaj and Vishal Bhardwaj, singer Shilpa Rao, screenwriter Varun Grover, and comedian Zakir Khan. The sessions highlighted the shared history and culture of India and Pakistan and advocated for peace between the two countries. However, the initiative came to an end after a circular issued by FWICE on April 11, 2020, warned Indian artists to not collaborate with Pakistanis.

On May 17, 2020, Sethi took part in a conversation with Nirupama Rao, former Foreign Secretary of India, to discuss how art intersects with issues of interconnectedness, identity, and culture in South Asia. Sethi and Rao discussed the historical and cultural bonds between India and Pakistan. The conversation was hosted by the Bangalore International Centre and the South Asian Symphony Foundation. Sethi sang and composed the song "Pehla Qadam" which was released on September 18, 2020. The song was produced by Danish Renzu and Abubakar Khan and featured Sunny Jain on drums. Its lyrics were written by Sunayana Kachroo. During Harvard University's Worldwide Week in October 2020, Sethi performed a rendition of Amir Khusrau's well-known qawwali, "Aaj Rang Hai," as part of a presentation titled Khusrau's River of Love: Cosmopolitanism and Inclusion in South Asian Traditions.

In May 2021, Sethi released the song "Yakjehti Mein" (transl. In Solidarity) composed by Chilean-American composer Nicolás Jaar. The song was made for the Palestinian online radio station, Radio Alhara, and was broadcast live from Bethlehem in May 2021. Sethi used verses from two poems ("Hum Dekhenge" and "Aaj Bazaar Mein") penned by eminent Pakistani poet Faiz Ahmad Faiz for the song which was meant to show solidarity and support for the people of Palestine. Describing the process of developing the track and the mixing of the two poems, Sethi stated: "It was an unorthodox mix of music but Nicolas felt that it went well with my words. The part where the beat paces up sounded to me like a march or a procession, which is why I suggested a second poem by Faiz to be sung to its tune."

In September 2021, Sethi collaborated with Indian author Amitav Ghosh for his first book-in-verse, Jungle Nama: A Story of the Sundarban, based on the legend of Bonbibi. Sethi narrated the musical audiobook of Jungle Nama in addition to composing and performing music for it. Sethi stated that he wanted to "evoke the wonder of the Sundarban through its sound and poetry" while working on this project. He described that he drew on "syncretic raga traditions" and folk tunes to compose the music for Jungle Nama, using "traditional instruments like surmandal and dhol" and combining different musical traditions. One of the songs from the audiobook — "Baya Jao" — is Sethi's first song in the Bengali language.

=== 2022: Global popularity with "Pasoori" and continued success ===
In February 2022, Sethi co-wrote, co-composed, and sang the song "Pasoori" for Coke Studio Season 14 with debutant singer Shae Gill. Sethi described the song as "a love song, a bit of a flower bomb thrown at nationalism, a queer anthem, a protest song, a power ballad [and] a song of togetherness." "Pasoori" became the fastest song of the season to garner one million views on YouTube. It went on to become the first Coke Studio Pakistan song to feature on Spotify's "Viral 50" global chart and also ranked at number one on Spotify India's "Viral 50" chart on March 7, 2022. On April 26, 2022, "Pasoori" debuted at the 161st spot on Spotify's Global Chart. On May 4, 2022, it climbed to the top of Spotify's "Viral 50 - Global" chart and on May 7, 2022 – 90 days after its release — "Pasoori" hit 100 million views on YouTube. According to information released by Spotify in December 2022, "Pasoori" was the most-streamed Pakistani song globally and also the most-streamed song in Pakistan in 2022. It was also the most-searched song in the world in 2022, as per Google Trends' "Year in Search 2022" report. With over one billion views on YouTube as of January 2025, "Pasoori" is currently the most watched Coke Studio music video of all time and the first Coke Studio song to reach this milestone.

In September 2022, Sethi performed at the inaugural celebration of the Saxena Center for Contemporary South Asia at Brown University. To commemorate 75 years of independence for both India and Pakistan, Sethi performed at Harvard University's '75 Years of Azadi: A Celebration of South Asia' event in September 2022, with keynote addresses delivered by Nobel Laureate Dr. Amartya Sen and former Finance Minister of Pakistan, Syed Babar Ali. The same month, Sethi performed at the O2 Arena in London, UK with Shae Gill and Leo Twins.

On October 14, 2022, Sethi performed at the first Coke Studio live concert held at the Coca-Cola Arena in Dubai, UAE along with Faisal Kapadia, Shae Gill, Hasan Raheem, Young Stunners, and Justin Bibis. Sethi was among the first headliners to be announced for the show in July 2022.

=== 2023: Notable tours and performances, first EP, and first album ===
On November 8, 2022, Sethi announced his 2023 North American tour featuring 11 stops across the United States and Canada including Chicago, Seattle, San Francisco, Los Angeles, Toronto, and Vancouver. The tour concluded in February 2023.

In March 2023, Sethi performed at the second annual South Asian Excellence pre-Oscars event hosted by Paramount Pictures, Priyanka Chopra, and Mindy Kaling, among others. In April 2023, Sethi performed at the Coachella Valley Music and Arts Festival, making him only the second person of Pakistani origin (after Arooj Aftab) to perform at the festival.

In May 2023, an unreleased single by Sethi was featured in a short fashion film based on Misha Japanwala's gallery show titled "Beghairati Ki Nishaani: Traces of Shamelessness" — a project that offered commentary on gender-based violence and the concept of shame as experienced by Pakistani women.

In June 2023, Sethi announced his world tour with stops in Dubai, Glasgow, Dublin, London, Austin, and Atlanta, among others. The tour concluded on November 19, 2023 with his final show at Shepherd's Bush Empire in West London.

In July 2023, Sethi performed at the 45th annual BRIC Celebrate Brooklyn! festival in Brooklyn, New York, hosted by BRIC Arts Media. Later that month, Sethi released his first extended play (EP) titled "Paniya" (transl. waters), produced by Noah Georgeson, Gregory Rogove, and Anthony Soshil. The EP included four tracks: "Paniya," "Kaase Kahu," "Raat Bhar," and "Dil Mein Ab," with the latter two being partially based on the writings of Faiz Ahmad Faiz.

In August 2023, Sethi performed at the 18th edition of TD Mosaic Festival in Mississauga.

In October 2023, Sethi performed at the Austin City Limits Music Festival. The same month, as part of his artist residency at Brown University, Sethi delivered a seminar titled "Raga Saga: Theory and Practice in North Indian Music."

On November 17, 2023, Sethi released his first album, Intiha (transl. extreme point or limit), under Other People Records. The lead single from the album, "Muddat," was released on September 19. Sethi collaborated with Chilean music composer Nicolás Jaar for the album which borrowed "spliced loops" from Jaar’s 2020 album Telas. Intiha was described as reimagining the ghazal through "engineered rave revivalism" and a recontextualized fusion of folk, country, and electronic music.

=== 2024–present: Notable singles, performances, and two albums ===
In January 2024, Sethi collaborated with Canadian singer Jonita Gandhi for the single "Love Like That." Rolling Stone India described the single as a "qawwali-informed hyper-pop tune," and noted Sethi for his "traditionally-rooted versatility." In March 2024, Sethi performed at the Savannah College of Art and Design, Atlanta, following it up with a performance at Georgetown University in April 2024 as part of its Georgetown Global Dialogues series. In May 2024, Sethi took part in a live podcast episode at Queens College, CUNY, along with novelist Joyce Carol Oates.

In August 2025, Sethi released his first full-length solo album titled Love Language, comprising 16 tracks, under the label Zubberdust Media. The album was described as a cross-genre blend of "hyperpop, reggaeton, Sufi chant, and Hindustani classical music." In September 2025, Sethi announced his month-long North American fall tour, with 11 stops across the United States and Canada including Boston, Los Angeles, Chicago, Toronto, and Vancouver, among others. The tour concluded on October 22, 2025 in Seattle.

In March 2026, Sethi announced his new album in collaboration with American drummer and songwriter Gregory Rogove titled Room Jhoom. The lead single, "Embrace," was released the same month. Room Jhoom was released on May 22, 2026 and was described as a fusion of "soft Sufi" and "fast-paced Caribbean" – thereby combining Sethi's and Rogove's musical sensibilities. Sethi asserted that the album was his attempt at bridging the gap between South Asian and Latin American pop.

In October 2026, Sethi led a discussion at the Ubud Writers & Readers Festival in Bali, Indonesia titled "Ghazal, Music and The Pathways of Longing."

== Artistry ==
=== Revitalizing the ghazal ===
Sethi is particularly known for experimenting with and modernizing the ancient ghazal format of singing, and he describes his artistic style as being "rooted in tradition but looking towards the future." He has received acclaim for "performing iconic ghazals and putting his spin on them" and has mentioned in various interviews that the ghazal is one of his favorite genres of music. He has also stated that he is drawn to "obscure and outdated forms of poetry and music" and that he is "interested in reviving lost techniques and lost cultures" in a way that redefines the traditional as experimental. Sethi acknowledges that the popularity of ghazals has declined in recent decades, but contends that "ghazals are actually a young person's genre," claiming that "it just has an image problem." He has mentioned that one of his objectives is to revitalize and reposition classic Urdu ghazals through contemporary arrangements while doing justice to the spirit of the original work, asserting: "If you just filter western pop music into our music without much thought, the result is very dissatisfying. I earlier rendered Farida Khanum's classic "Mohabbat Karne Walay" and added the sarangi and electric guitar to the music. I'm all for innovating, but while remaining connected to the source." In his live musical performances, Sethi frequently offers critical discourse about the ghazal as an art form, its evolution as a genre, and adds commentary on the origins of various classical ragas and philological roots of Urdu words.

Sethi has discussed his opposition to the traditional binaries of tradition and modernity, contending in an interview: "What I found through traditional music, through my immersion in and engagement with South Asian forms of folk and classical music, is this wonderful paradox: you find through these 'traditional' things genuinely radical, freeing, subversive, cosmopolitan, experimental worldviews." He has also stated that one of his goals is to raise greater awareness and enthusiasm for classical music and the great South Asian poets through his music.

=== Protest and dissent ===
Sethi notes that due to his parents' professions as journalists and politicians, he grew up around journalists, artists, activists, and politicians as a child and that his formative years were spent amidst "a lot of dissenting voices". His childhood home was "full of jail-going writers and activists," shared Sethi in a profile in The New Yorker. He claims that these early life experiences influenced his thinking and shaped his musical philosophy in that many of his songs and music videos seek to address social issues. "Song and protest [are] intertwined for me," Sethi asserted in The New Yorker profile. At his performance at the Royal Geographical Society, London, in February 2020, Sethi juxtaposed two images on the large screen – one of the 2020 NRC protests in India and the other of the Zia-ul-Haq protests in Pakistan in the 1980s, as he sang Faiz Ahmad Faiz's "Hum Dekhenge." Writing for The Express Tribune, journalist Shuja Uddin noted: "The images are powerful because they aptly told the narrative of Pakistan in post-colonial South Asia as one of reflection and warning for other neighboring countries. Sethi's particular visual became viral and brought together hurt citizens from both countries to find resonance in each other's tragedy."

In an op-ed published in The Guardian on August 14, 2022, Sethi and co-writer Pankaj Mishra stated: "As we commemorate the 75th anniversary of partition, it is abundantly clear to us that politics in India and Pakistan are doomed to keep forging a history of irresolvable enmity between Hindus and Muslims. It is also clear that any reasonable hope for peace between these two nuclear powers cannot rest on a political and economic breakthrough alone." Sethi and Mishra go on to claim that "hopes for a survivable present and viable future depend a great deal on how we understand our inheritance – the long, deep, and still alive past of the Indian subcontinent."

Through his work, Sethi believes in collapsing the traditional boundaries of religion, caste, class, gender, and geography. He has stated that he aims to "revive an interest in...layered ways of being and of experiencing poetry, music, art, visuals…insist on these multiple interpretations, and allow people from different backgrounds and perspectives to take part in a conversation." Sethi's musical work often explores the myriad intersections of art, philosophy, scripture, and music. Sethi is a vocal advocate for pluralism and tolerance, and his music and videos frequently challenge prevailing views on gender identity and sexuality.

=== Sufi influence and reviving folk music ===
Sethi is known to infuse his music with "metaphors and wide-ranging themes, leaving it open to interpretation and welcoming in a broad audience." To accomplish this, he often uses or references source material from Sufi poetry in his music which frequently adopts inclusive and liberal views on issues such as gender and religion. Sethi has asserted that "Sufi poems and metaphors revel in ambiguity, undoing such binaries as sacred and secular, male and female, spiritual and material. In that sense I think they are like this incredible technology of the heart – one that can help us do dialogue across difference in this highly polarized time". Sethi also acknowledges that "the appetite for Sufi music in Pakistan allows people like me to get away with a lot of potentially subversive stuff through the metaphors of Sufi poetry – these beautiful, deliberate ambiguities."

Sethi champions the value and power of traditional South Asian folk music and often uses the catchphrase "folk is woke" to argue that traditional folk music from the subcontinent allows South Asians across the world to tap into their ancestral roots and access "something that can nourish our contemporary consciousness and quest for an identity that feels whole, yet liberated." In an interview with The Harvard Crimson Sethi stated: "I find that folk traditions of South Asia are some of the most flexible, fluid, mystical, philosophically supple traditions in human history. That's what my undergrad years at Harvard taught me. That's what my immersive apprenticeship in Hindustani classical sangeet [music] taught me. That's what my understanding of poetry has taught me..." In an interview with VICE News, he similarly asserted that Pakistan's folk traditions are among the most resilient, empowering, and "identity-enhancing" traditions in the world, enabling people to look beyond the limiting binaries of traditional versus modern. Similarly, in a 2024 profile by T: The New York Times Style Magazine, Sethi claimed that traditional South Asian music has always contained the "antibodies" that are necessary to "heal a divisive culture from within" because it has always been cosmopolitan.

=== Diasporic identity and culture ===
In a 2020 interview with Nirupama Rao, Sethi noted: "I arrived in Harvard in 2002, one year after 9/11 – there was very little 'connectivity' in the world at that time. If you wanted to delve into the history of the region, you really had to go to the library. I remember being haunted by this question – what does it mean to be Pakistani, to come from an Indo-Muslim context? Where do you draw your sense of identity and genealogy, what do you include and exclude?" Sethi contends that through his performances at Harvard's Ghunghroo, he found a "scholarly environment [that] could give me a way into my own heritage, a way to convey to people where I was coming from."

Sethi's music frequently delves into notions of self and identity, particularly in the context of brown history and diaspora culture. In a 2023 interview with Pitchfork, Sethi asserted: "When you live on the fault line of various identities, you want to make something that reflects all of you. I just have this undying need to recontextualize things and make unlikely connections." He has stated that he sees himself and his music as a "diasporic voice" that caters to "the desire for an identity that makes us feel spiritually whole."

Sethi claims that a lot of his music is an attempt at "reconciling the tradition of Hindustani classical music that I have always loved, with the contemporary sounds that I hear around me" through "unconventional arrangements." He has stated that dividing his time between the United States and Pakistan gives him "access to this really interesting tension. I am here but I am also there, I am in the East and in the West, I am a traditional musician but also a cosmopolitan one. How do I connect the two experiences without having to choose one over the other? It's an eternal question for people like myself." Sethi has also shared that living and working in the United States has enabled him to feel more accepted and embrace multiculturalism in a way that he was not able to while growing up, stating: "Multilingual, multi-ethnic, multi-valent identities were celebrated in the Sufi shrines 800 years ago — in Lahore, which was where I was born...and yet growing up I was never really encouraged to think of it that way."

As an artist, Sethi has been described as "the face of post-colonial Pakistan, reconciling with its checkered past and contextualizing its mysterious future," and his musical style has been described as a "reaffirmation of his post-colonial South Asian identity."

=== Voice ===
Sethi's voice has been described as raw and youthful, having a rich and supple tenor, powerful but controlled, "soulful," "soft but polished," ranging from "plaintive to raw to warmly intimate," and as having a "moving and melodic quality." He is often lauded for his "soaring vocals," skillful harkats, "vocal gymnastics," "emotive delivery," and ability to hit high notes. In a 2015 opinion column, Indian classical singer Shubha Mudgal described Sethi's voice in the following words: "Sethi's voice bears the unmistakable signs of taaleem and riyaaz, that is, of being both well-trained and well-rehearsed. But it is the bit of heartbreak in his voice that makes his singing sit apart for me. This is not an attribute that can be imparted by training. Neither can it be carefully cultivated. It really is an inexplicable quality that a singer is lucky to be gifted with."

== Reception ==
Sethi has been described as a "genre-bending musician," "a master of microtonal singing," and his music has been characterized as telling "stories of exuberance and joy from the margins." His work has been praised for deftly combining the conventional sounds of Pakistani music and traditional Urdu poetry with contemporary pop music, thereby putting new-age Pakistani music on the map. Sethi has been credited with helping to resurrect the lost art of the ghazal by reinventing it for present-day audiences and making the genre more approachable for younger generations in mainstream Pakistani culture as well as internationally. His experiments with the ghazal format have been characterized as "nothing short of a revolt to bring what is seen as an "aunty-uncle genre" out of stuffy drawing rooms to younger audiences." Haroon Rashid of BBC Asian Network described Sethi as "the king of modern ghazal."

In 2020, The Express Tribune characterized Sethi's musical style as highlighting "the narrative of Pakistan that does not stem from nationalistic ambitions but rather acknowledges the crevices and folds in Pakistani life, albeit in a fantastical fashion the ghazal genre so spectacularly lends itself to." Indian singer and rapper Yo Yo Honey Singh compared Sethi with playback legend Mohammed Rafi. Indian actor and singer Ayushmann Khurrana has also praised Sethi's singing.

Sethi's approach to music is frequently described as being innovative, and he has been lauded for exploring "the fertile frontier of experimenting outside the confines of his education, and collaborating with musicians spanning genres including jazz, reggaetón, hip hop and salsa." Sethi's work is often hailed for its consistent message of inclusivity and challenging social norms, and his music has received praise for "pushing boundaries, eschewing conventions and venturing into unknown new territories." Lydialyle Gibson of Harvard Magazine has said of Sethi's work that "boundaries fall away – between past and present, earthly and transcendent, between art and religion and politics."

== Personal life ==
Sethi is queer and is one of the few Pakistani artists to openly identify as such. He is dating New York-based Pakistani-American painter Salman Toor. In August 2023, rumors spread on social media that Sethi and Toor had gotten married in a private ceremony in New York, causing homophobic trolling online. Sethi denied the rumors and stated that he was not married.

Sethi is a naturalized American citizen, making him a dual citizen of Pakistan and the United States. He resides in Manhattan, New York.

== Filmography ==
=== Film ===
Year	Title	Song	Notes
2012	The Reluctant Fundamentalist	"Dil Jalaane Ki Baat Karte Ho"	
2015	Manto	"Aah Ko Chahiye"	
2015	Manto	"Kya Hoga"	co-singer Zebunnisa Bangash
2018	Saat Din Mohabbat In	"Yunhi Rastay Mai"	co-singer Aima Baig
2019	Superstar	"Bekaraan"	co-singer Zeb Bangash

=== Television ===
Year	Show	Song	Notes
2015	Ye Mera Deewanapan Hai	"Ye Mera Deewanapan Hai"	Title song
2015	Coke Studio Pakistan (season 8)	"Sohni Dharti"	Promo song for season
2015	Coke Studio Pakistan (season 8)	"Umraan Langiyaan"	Duet with Nabeel Shaukat Ali
2016	Coke Studio Pakistan (season 9)	"Aye Rah-e-Haq Ke Shaheedo"	Promo song for season
2016	Coke Studio Pakistan (season 9)	"Aaqa"	Duet with Abida Parveen
2017	Coke Studio Pakistan (season 10)	National Anthem of Pakistan	Promo song for season
2017	Coke Studio Pakistan (season 10)	"Ranjish Hi Sahi"	Solo; written by Ahmad Faraz
2017	Coke Studio Pakistan (season 10)	"Thinak Dhin"	Trio with Ali Hamza and Waqar Ehsin
2017	Teri Raza	"Mohabbat Karne Wale"	Originally sung by Mehdi Hassan
2018	Noor ul Ain	"Dil Ko Bhoolay"	Duet with Zebunnisa Bangash
2018	Coke Studio Pakistan (season 11)	"Hum Dekhenge"	Promo song for season
2018	Coke Studio Pakistan (season 11)	"Luddi Hai Jamalo"	Duet with Humaira Arshad
2019	Coke Studio Pakistan (season 12)	"Gulon Main Rang"	Written by Faiz Ahmad Faiz
2019	Coke Studio Pakistan (season 12)	"Mundiya"	Duet with Quratulain Balouch
2020	Sabaat	"Sabaat"	Written by Kashif Anwar
2022	Coke Studio Pakistan (season 14)	"Pasoori"	Duet with Shae Gill

== Discography ==
=== Albums and EPs ===
- Paniya (EP, 2023)

No.	Title	Lyrics	Length
1.	"Paniya"	Ali Sethi and Noah Georgeson, based on lyrics by Tanras Khan	6:50
2.	"Dil Mein Ab"	Ali Sethi, based on text by Faiz Ahmad Faiz	3:10
3.	"Raat Bhar"	Ali Sethi and JC Cassis, based on text by Faiz Ahmad Faiz	4:28
4.	"Kaase Kahu"	Ali Sethi	4:48
Total length:			19:16

- Intiha (Album, 2023)

No.	Title	Lyrics	Length
1.	"Muddat" (Lead single)	Ali Sethi; Nicolas Jaar; Mirza Ghalib	5:59
2.	"Nazar Se"	Anwar Mirzapur; Ali Sethi; Nicolas Jaar	4:14
3.	"Intiha"	Allama Iqbal; Ali Sethi; Nicolas Jaar	3:50
4.	"Raat Bhar" (Re-release)	Ali Sethi; Nicolas Jaar	2:58
5.	"Dard"	Ali Sethi; Nicolas Jaar	7:30
6.	"Chiragh"	Ali Sethi; Nicolas Jaar	5:46
7.	"Lagta Nahi"	Ali Sethi; Nicolas Jaar	2:10
8.	"Dono Jahan"	Faiz Ahmad Faiz; Ali Sethi; Nicolas Jaar	3:32
Total length:			35:59

- Love Language (Album, 2025)
- Room Jhoom (Album, 2026)

=== Cover singles ===
- "Haal Aisa Nahin" (Ghulam Ali cover)
- "Yaad Mein Teri" (Lata Mangeshkar and Mohammed Rafi cover)
- "Dil Jalaane Ki Baat Karte Ho" (Farida Khanum cover) (2014)
- "Kithay Nain Na Jorin" (Reshma cover) (2015)
- "Chan Kithan" (Punjabi folk song) (2017)
- "Dil Karda Ay" and "Agar Tum Mil Jao" ft. Quratulain Balouch (2018)
- "Mere Hamnafas" (Begum Akhtar cover) (2019)
- "Mere Aur Hain Iraday" (2020)
- "Ghazab Kiya" (2023)

=== Original singles ===
- "Mahi Mera" (2016)
- "Waasta" (2018)
- "Chandni Raat" (2019)
- "Ishq" (2019)
- "Dil Ki Khair" (2019)
- "Dil Lagayeein" (2019)
- "Pehla Qadam" (2020)
- "Rung" (2021)
- "Yakjehti Mein" (2021)
- "Left Right" (2023)
- "Lovely Bukhaar" (2024)
- "Dil (Awakening)" (2024)
- "Tera Sitam" (2025)

=== Featured Artist ===
- 2016: "Aaja" – Swet Shop Boys ft. Ali Sethi
- 2018: Sound The People – "Kala Mukhra"
- 2024: Love Like That (with Jonita Gandhi)

== Awards and nominations ==
Sethi was nominated for Best Playback Singer - Male at 15th Lux Style Awards, and Best Playback Singer - Male at 2nd ARY Film Awards for performing "Aah Ko Chahiye" in the film Manto. His single Kithay Nain Na Jorin was nominated for Best Music Single and Best Music Video at the 4th Hum Awards.

Year	Awards	Category	Nominated work	Result	Ref(s)
2010	Shakti Bhatt Awards	Shakti Bhatt First Book Prize Awards	The Wish Maker	Nominated	
2016	Hum Awards	Best Music Single	"Kithay Nain Na Jorin"	Nominated	
2016	ARY Film Awards	Best Playback Singer - Male	"Aah Ko Chahiye"	Nominated	
2016	Lux Style Awards	Best Playback Singer - Male	"Aah Ko Chahiye"	Nominated	
