= List of awards and nominations received by Kiara Advani =

Kiara Advani awards and nominations
- Advani in 2022
Awards and nominations
| Award | Wins | Nominations |
| Smita Patil Memorial Award | 1 | – |
| Filmfare Awards | 0 | 2 |
| International Indian Film Academy Awards | 1 | 3 |
| BIG Star Entertainment Awards | 0 | 1 |
| Nickelodeon Kids' Choice Awards | 3 | 4 |
| Screen Awards | 1 | 1 |
| Filmfare OTT Awards | 0 | 1 |
| Zee Cine Awards | 3 | 6 |
| Zee Cine Awards Telugu | 1 | 1 |
| ETC Bollywood Business Awards | 2 | 2 |
| Indian Television Academy Awards | 1 | 1 |
| Asiavision Awards | 1 | 1 |
| Lions Gold Awards | 1 | 1 |
| Others | 12 | 30 |

Totals (Note: Certain award groups do not simply award one winner. They acknowledge several different recipients, have runners-up, and have third place. Since this is a specific recognition and is different from losing an award, runner-up mentions are considered wins in this award tally. For simplification and to avoid errors, each award in this list has been presumed to have had a prior nomination.)
- Wins: 30
- Nominations: 56

Kiara Advani is an Indian actress who works predominantly in Hindi and Telugu language films. Advani has received more than 25 accolades, including the International Indian Film Academy Award, Screen Awards, Zee Cine Awards, and Smita Patil Memorial Award. She has also received two Filmfare Awards nominations.

== Filmfare Awards ==
| Year | Category | Film | Result | Ref. |
|---|---|---|---|---|
| 2022 | Best Actress | Shershaah | Nominated | |
| 2024 | Best Actress | Satyaprem Ki Katha | Nominated | |

== Filmfare OTT Awards ==
| Year | Category | Film | Result | Ref. |
|---|---|---|---|---|
| 2020 | Best Actor in a Web Original Film – Female | Guilty | Nominated | |

== IIFA Awards ==
| Year | Category | Film | Result | Ref. |
|---|---|---|---|---|
| 2020 | Best Supporting Actress | Good Newwz | Won | |
| 2022 | Best Actress in a Leading Role | Shershaah | Nominated | |
| 2024 | Best Actress in a Leading Role | Satyaprem Ki Katha | Nominated | |

== Screen Awards ==
| Year | Category | Film | Result | Ref. |
|---|---|---|---|---|
| 2015 | Best Female Debut | Fugly | Won | |

== Zee Cine Awards ==
| Year | Category | Film | Result | Ref. |
|---|---|---|---|---|
| 2019 | Best Actor – Female (Viewer's Choice) | Kabir Singh | Nominated | |
| 2023 | Best Actor – Female (Viewer's Choice) | Bhool Bhulaiyaa 2 | Nominated | |
| 2023 | Performer of the Year Female | Bhool Bhulaiyaa 2 | Won | |
| 2023 | Performer of the Year Female | Jugjugg Jeeyo | Won | |
| 2024 | Best Actor – Female (Viewer's Choice) | Satyaprem Ki Katha | Won | |
| 2024 | Best Actor – Female (Jury's Choice) | Satyaprem Ki Katha | Nominated | |

== Zee Cine Awards Telugu ==
| Year | Category | Film | Result | Ref. |
|---|---|---|---|---|
| 2019 | Best Find of the Year – Female | Bharat Ane Nenu | Won | |

== BIG Star Entertainment Awards ==
| Year | Category | Film | Result | Ref. |
|---|---|---|---|---|
| 2015 | Most Entertaining Debut Actress | Fugly | Nominated | |

== ETC Bollywood Business Awards ==
| Year | Category | Film | Result | Ref. |
|---|---|---|---|---|
| 2019 | Highest Grossing Actress | Kabir Singh | Won | |
| 2020 | Highest Grossing Actress | Good Newwz | Won | |

== Smita Patil Memorial Award ==
| Year | Category | Film | Result | Ref. |
|---|---|---|---|---|
| 2021 | Best Actress | – | Won | |

== Asiavision Awards ==
| Year | Category | Film | Result | Ref. |
|---|---|---|---|---|
| 2019 | Emerging Star of the Year | – | Won | |

== News 18 Reel Awards ==
| Year | Category | Film | Result | Ref. |
|---|---|---|---|---|
| 2023 | Best Actress | Shershaah | Nominated | |
| 2023 | Best Actress | Jugjugg Jeeyo | Nominated | |
| 2023 | Star of the Year | – | Won | |
| 2024 | Best Actress | Satyaprem Ki Katha | Nominated | |

== Nickelodeon Kids' Choice Awards ==
| Year | Category | Film | Result | Ref. |
|---|---|---|---|---|
| 2021 | Most Remarkable Performer | – | Won | |
| 2022 | Favourite Movie Actor (Female) | Shershaah | Won | |
| 2023 | Favourite Movie Actor (Female) | Jugjugg Jeeyo | Won | |

== Indian Television Academy Awards ==
| Year | Category | Film | Result | Ref. |
|---|---|---|---|---|
| 2020 | Most Popular Actress – OTT | Guilty | Won | |

== Other awards and recognition ==
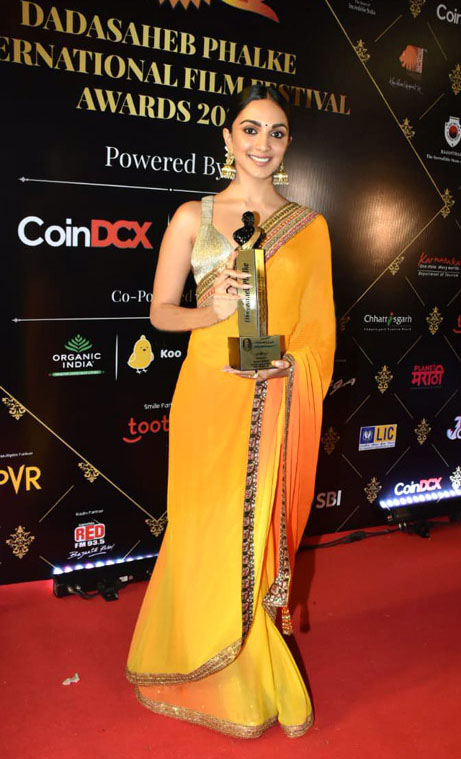
Advani at the Dadasaheb Phalke International Film Festival Awards in 2022

| Year | Award/Organisation | Category | Result | Ref. |
|---|---|---|---|---|
| 2019 | Filmfare Glamour And Style Awards | Hotstepper of the Year (Female) | Won | |
| 2021 | Aaj Tak Sabse Tez Awards | Sabse Tez Heroine | Won | |
| 2021 | Talent Track Awards | Best Actress – Drama/Thriller | Won | |
| 2022 | Lokmat Stylish Awards | Maharashtrian of the Year | Won | |
| 2022 | HELLO! Hall of Fame Awards | Critics Best Actor of the Year | Won | |
| 2022 | Lions Gold Awards | Best Actress | Won | |
| 2022 | Hitlist OTT Awards | Best Actor – Female | Won | |
| 2022 | IWM Digital Awards | Most Popular Actress In A Digital Film | Won | |
| 2022 | Pinkvilla Style Icons Awards | Super Stylish Actor (Female) | Won | |
| 2022 | Femina Beauty Awards | Golden Beauty of the Year | Won | |
| 2022 | Grazia Millennial Awards | Star on the Rise | Won | |
| 2023 | Bollywood Hungama Style Icons | Most Iconic Performer (Female) | Nominated | |
| 2023 | Bollywood Hungama Style Icons | Stylish Actress Female | Nominated | |
| 2023 | Pinkvilla Style Icons Awards | Style Icon of the Year | Won | |
| 2024 | Pinkvilla Screen and Style Icons Awards | Best Actress (Popular Choice) | Won | |
| 2024 | Pinkvilla Screen and Style Icons Awards | Best Actress (Jury's Choice) | Nominated | |
| 2024 | Bollywood Hungama Style Icons | Performer of the Year (Female) | Nominated | |
| 2024 | Bollywood Hungama Style Icons | Charismatic Performance of the Year | Nominated | |
| 2026 | The Hollywood Reporter | "Women in Entertainment" | Honoured | |
| 2026 | Pinkvilla Screen and Style Icons Awards | Fashion Icon of the Year | Won | |
