= Satyaprem Ki Katha =

2023 Indian film by Sameer Vidwans

- Threatical release poster
- Directed by: Sameer Vidwans
- Written by: Karan Shrikant Sharma
- Produced by: Sajid Nadiadwala; Shareen Mantri Kedia; Kishor Arora
- Starring: Kartik Aaryan; Kiara Advani
- Cinematography: Ayananka Bose
- Edited by: Charu Shree Roy
- Music by: Score: Hitesh Sonik; Songs: Meet Bros; Anjjan Bhattacharya; Tanishk Bagchi; Manan Bhardwaj; Payal Dev; Rochak Kohli; Ali Sethi
- Production companies: Nadiadwala Grandson Entertainment; Namah Pictures
- Distributed by: Pen Marudhar Entertainment
- Release date: 29 June 2023
- Running time: 144 minutes
- Country: India
- Language: Hindi
- Budget: ₹60 crore
- Box office: ₹117.77 crore

Satyaprem Ki Katha (transl. Tale of True Love) (Note: A play on the Hindi phrase "Satyanarayan ki katha" (lit. 'Tale of Satyanarayan'), a particular popular narrative of the Hindu god Vishnu (cf. Satya Pir). The male protagonist's name is Satyaprem, and female protagonist is Katha, so it can mean Satyaprem's Katha.) is a 2023 Indian Hindi-language romantic drama film directed by Sameer Vidwans and produced by Sajid Nadiadwala under Nadiadwala Grandson Entertainment. The film stars Kartik Aaryan and Kiara Advani as the titular leads. The film follows Satyaprem, as he struggles to understand the reason behind his wife, Katha's repulsiveness towards his desire to consummate their marriage as the latter hides a dark secret, putting their marriage in a jeopardy.

Satyaprem Ki Katha was theatrically released on 29 June 2023 to positive reviews. It was a moderate commercial success, grossing ₹117.77 crore (US$13 million) worldwide. At the 69th Filmfare Awards, the film received nominations for Best Actress (Advani) and Best Story.

== Plot ==
Satyaprem "Sattu" is an unhappy lower-middle-class boy who is a failed law student. He lives with his parents and younger sister. Atypically, his mother and sister are the breadwinners while he and his father are both unemployed. Sattu is frustrated as he is the only remaining bachelor in his neighborhood. His mother declines to find a bride for him, but looks for a groom for her daughter, which makes Sattu jealous. Sattu informs his father that he is still in love with a girl, Katha, who he saw a year ago at the Garba. However, she was already in a relationship with a man named Tapan.

Sattu learns that Katha has broken up with Tapan and that her parents are looking for a suitable groom for her. He visits the Garba celebration again with his father, Narayan, hoping to see Katha dance again. There they meet Katha's father, Harikishen, a wealthy businessman who owns a popular snack shop, along with her mother and her younger sister, Kinjal. He learns from them that Katha is sick, and after some persuasion from Narayan, he goes to see her at her home. Upon arriving, he is shocked to see that she had tried to commit suicide by slitting her wrists. He rushes her to hospital. Katha recovers, but is angry at Sattu for saving her. Later that night, Katha thanks Sattu for saving her life through a text message. The next day, Sattu visits Katha and gifts her flowers.

A few days pass, and Katha's parents bring a marriage proposal to Sattu's family. Sattu is overjoyed and accepts the marriage. Katha, on the other hand, is unhappy, but reluctantly agrees to the marriage. After the marriage, Sattu tries to get intimate with Katha, but she is not interested and asks Sattu to sleep separately, using his snoring as an excuse. Sattu tries to fix his snoring problem unsuccessfully, but eventually realizes it is an excuse. On questioning Katha, she admits she lied, telling him that she is asexual and does not feel the desire to have sex, shocking Sattu.

Frustrated, Sattu tells Harikishen the next day that if the situation does not improve, he will end the marriage and get a divorce. Harikishen advises him to give her some more time to warm up to him and that Sattu should try to make her feel comfortable. Following Harikishen's advice, Sattu tries to win Katha's affection. He buys her gifts and takes her out on dates. Their relationship improves and Katha reveals that she had lied about being asexual, but that she doesn't feel comfortable revealing the real reason. Sattu is understanding, and reiterates that he will be there for her regardless. Katha encourages Sattu to attempt the law examination again. One night, Katha invites Sattu to share a bed again, but when they try to get intimate, Katha has an emotional breakdown.

It is revealed that Tapan had raped Katha the previous year after the Garba celebration. She had become pregnant and had to get an abortion. Katha's family never told anyone of the incident and had disowned Katha. Due to all this, Katha is not comfortable in being intimate with anyone. Sattu is furious and confronts Harikishen. He then heads to Tapan's workplace and thrashes him, which leads to Sattu getting arrested, although Tapan does not press charges. Later, Sattu and Katha leave for Kashmir for their honeymoon, now more deeply in love with each other. Katha is still unable to get intimate with Sattu, but Sattu understands and gives her the space to cope with her past.

On the day of Satyanarayan Puja at Katha's house, Sattu arrives after registering an FIR against Tapan. Sattu brings the papers to Katha to sign them, encouraging her to fight for herself. With renewed hope and love for each other, Sattu and Katha perform the puja together and start their fight against Tapan in the court. Sattu finally obtains his law degree, while Katha starts healing slowly with Sattu's constant support.

== Cast ==
- Kartik Aaryan as Satyaprem a.k.a Sattu
- Kiara Advani as Katha Kishen Kapadia
- Gajraj Rao as Narayan Bhai
- Supriya Pathak as Diwali Ben
- Siddharth Randeria as Harikishen Kapadia
- Anuradha Patel as Rasna Kapadia
- Rajpal Yadav as Doodhiya
- Shikha Talsania as Sejal
- Arjun Aneja as Tapan Manek
- Maira Doshi as Kinjal Kapadia
- Nirmiti Sawant as Christmas Masi
- Bhaumik Ahir as Chandresh, Sattu's neighbor
- Palash Tiwari as Dheeraj, Kinjal's fiance

== Production ==
=== Development ===
The film was officially announced with a motion poster on 23 June 2021 by Sajid Nadiadwala, to be directed by Sameer Vidwans and starring Kartik Aaryan. The title was originally slated to be Satyanarayan Ki Katha. It was later renamed Satyaprem Ki Katha due to controversy.

=== Casting ===
Kartik Aaryan was chosen to play the lead, in his first collaboration with Sajid Nadiadwala. It was later reported that Shraddha Kapoor was in talks for the female lead, however, after issues with her fees the role ultimately went to Advani in her second film with Aaryan after Bhool Bhulaiyaa 2 (2022). Her inclusion in the film was confirmed in July 2022.

=== Filming ===
The film went on floors on 3 September 2022 in Mumbai and the first schedule ended on 6 October 2022. In November 2022, the production moved to Ahmedabad, Gujarat. The final schedule began on 31 March 2023 in Kashmir. In April 2023, Advani wrapped up shoot.

The film was shot in various locations, including Ahmedabad, Vadodara, Gondal, Mumbai, Pune, Srinagar, and Gulmarg.

== Soundtrack ==
Satyaprem Ki Katha

Soundtrack album by Meet Bros, Anjjan, Tanishk Bagchi, Manan Bhardwaj, Payal Dev and Rochak Kohli
- Released: 1 July 2023
- Genre: Feature film soundtrack
- Length: 31:07
- Language: Hindi
- Label: T-Series

The film's music was composed by Meet Bros, Anjjan, Tanishk Bagchi, Manan Bhardwaj, Payal Dev, and Rochak Kohli. The lyrics were written by Kumaar, A. M. Turaz, Tanishk Bagchi, Vayu, Manan Bhardwaj, and Gurpreet Saini.

The first single titled "Naseeb Se" was released on 27 May 2023. The second single titled "Aaj Ke Baad" was released on 10 June 2023. The third single titled "Gujju Pataka" was released on 16 June 2023. The fourth single, titled "Sun Sajni," was released on 21 June 2023.

The song "Pasoori Nu" is a remake of the 2022 Pakistani song Pasoori sung by Ali Sethi and Shae Gill, composed by Ali Sethi, Fazal Abbas and written by Ali Sethi and Zulfiqar Jabbar Khan.

The sixth single titled "Le Aaunga" was released on 1 July 2023. The seventh single titled "Raat Baaki" and the eighth single titled "Aaj Ke Baad-Reprise" were released on 1 July 2023.

Track listing
No.	Title	Lyrics	Music	Singer(s)	Length
1.	"Naseeb Se"	A. M. Turaz	Payal Dev	Payal Dev, Vishal Mishra	3:04
2.	"Aaj Ke Baad"	Manan Bhardwaj	Manan Bhardwaj	Manan Bhardwaj, Tulsi Kumar	3:37
3.	"Gujju Pataka"	Kumaar	Meet Bros, Anjjan	Meet Bros, Star Boy LOC	4:27
4.	"Sun Sajni"	Kumaar	Meet Bros	Meet Bros, Parampara Tandon, Piyush Mehroliyaa	4:26
5.	"Pasoori Nu"	Gurpreet Saini	Rochak Kohli	Arijit Singh, Tulsi Kumar	3:17
6.	"Le Aaunga"	Tanishk-Vayu	Tanishk Bagchi	Arijit Singh	4:03
7.	"Raat Baaki"	Kumaar	Meet Bros	Meet Bros, Monali Thakur, Piyush Mehroliyaa	5:00
8.	"Aaj Ke Baad" (Reprise)	Manan Bhardwaj	Manan Bhardwaj	Manan Bhardwaj, Himani Kapoor	3:13
Total length:					31:07

== Release ==
=== Theatrical ===
Satyaprem Ki Katha was theatrically released on 29 June 2023.

=== Home media ===
The film was premiered on Amazon Prime Video from 24 August 2023.

=== Distribution ===
Pen Marudhar Entertainment acquired All India distribution rights for the film and Funasia Films, the US distribution is associated with Marudhar in Overseas.

== Reception ==
=== Critical response ===
On the review aggregator website Rotten Tomatoes, the film has an approval rating of 63%, with an average score of 5/10, based on reviews from 16 critics.

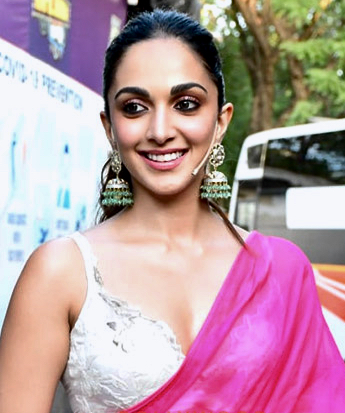
Critics praised the performance of Kiara Advani

Taran Adarsh for Bollywood Hungama gave the film 3.5 out of 5 stars and wrote "Satyaprem Ki Katha is a progressive film that rests on the towering performances, strong second half and the message it conveys." Abhimanyu Mathur of DNA India rated the film with 3.5 out of 5 stars and wrote "Both Kartik Aaryan and Kiara Advani deliver commendable performances in this imperfect-yet-enjoyable film." Ronak Kotecha of The Times of India rated the film with 3 out of 5 stars and wrote "Satyprem Ki Katha is driven by its need to preach and give a message. The subject does move you and leaves you with much to think about, however, it tends to take the more emotional route than an entertaining one." Ganesh Aaglave of Firstpost rated the film with 3 out of 5 stars and wrote "Director Sameer Vidwans has successfully managed to weave the complexities of society, which affect the mindset of an individual in a beautiful way. He handled the subject with utmost maturity". Sonil Dedhia of News18 rated the film with 3 out of 5 stars and wrote "Kudos to Kiara Advani for taking up a role which is so unconventional. Kartik Aaryan too handles a complex part with remarkable ease." Reya Mehrotra of The Week rated the film with 3 out of 5 stars and wrote "From rom-com to serious drama, Satyaprem Ki Katha oscillates between multiple themes".

Sukanya Verma of Rediff gave the film 2.5 out of 5 stars and in all praise for Advani's wrote, "One of the great criers of her generation, Kiara's pain pierces through the screen and makes a heartfelt picture of how she feels even when the script cannot see her, beyond the man who broke her trust or the man who'll mend it. She's the real katha in search of a worthy kahani." Shubhra Gupta of The Indian Express gave the film 2 out of 5 stars and wrote, Somewhere under the overwrought and overcooked plot of Kartik Aaryan-Kiara Advani-starrer is a real film about two people dealing with troubled pasts, but it gets buried under everything else that the movie throws at us." Zinia Bandyopadhyay of India Today rated the film with 2 out of 5 stars and wrote "Kartik Aaryan-Kiara Advani film suffers from curse of inconsistency". Anuj Kumar of The Hindu commented "Director Sameer Vidwans addresses date rape and the idea of consent but uses a bleeding pen to make his point in this uneven tale". Monika Rawal Kukreja of Hindustan Times wrote "Kartik Aaryan and Kiara Advani deliver stellar performance in his romantic comedy with a beating heart." Shomini Sen of WION wrote "There are very few films that have a lousy first half and a good second half and Satyaprem Ki Katha falls in this rare category."

Hiren Kotwani from Mid-Day opined that, "SatyaPrem Ki Katha makes an interesting watch for its wonderful performances and its central message. It will tug at your heartstrings more than it will bring a smile to your face". Uday Bhatia of Live Mint stated "Satyaprem Ki Katha changes its approach halfway through, but fares no better as a message film than as a lazy comedy". Nandini Ramnath of Scroll.in wrote "Marathi director Sameer Vidwans’s Hindi-language Satyaprem Ki Katha is billed as a true love story, a romance for the ages in which a man loves unconditionally and accepts his partner despite her dilemmas." Agnivo Niyogi of The Telegraph stated, "Aaryan easily pulls off the textbook good boy who never dithers from standing like a rock beside the woman he loves. Compared to Aaryan, it's Kiara who shows greater command over her craft, handling some challenging scenes with a lot of nuance".

Leaf Arbuthnot of The Guardian rated the film with 3 out of 5 stars and wrote "Tolerably corny taboo-busting tale of a lovable loser who courts a beautiful woman features epic dance scenes and catchy, involving music".

=== Box office ===
Satyaprem Ki Katha earned ₹9.25 crore (US$990,000) domestically and ₹2.87 crore (US$310,000) overseas, making its total collection ₹11.6 crore (US$1.2 million), on its opening day coinciding with Bakra Eid.

As of 10 August 2023, the film earned ₹117.77 crore worldwide.

== Accolades ==
Award	Ceremony date	Category	Recipients	Result	Ref.
Filmfare Awards	28 January 2024	Best Actress	Kiara Advani	Nominated	
Filmfare Awards	28 January 2024	Best Story	Karan Shrikant Sharma	Nominated	
International Indian Film Academy Awards	28 September 2024	Best Film	Satyaprem Ki Katha	Nominated	
International Indian Film Academy Awards	28 September 2024	Best Actress	Kiara Advani	Nominated	
International Indian Film Academy Awards	28 September 2024	Best Supporting Actor	Gajraj Rao	Nominated	
Iconic Gold Awards	1 February 2024	Best Actor (Critics)	Kartik Aaryan	Won	
Iconic Gold Awards	1 February 2024	Best Debut Director	Sameer Vidwans	Won	
Iconic Gold Awards	1 February 2024	Best Film	Satyaprem Ki Katha	Won	
News 18 Reel Awards	9 March 2024	Best Actor (Female)	Kiara Advani	Nominated	
News 18 Reel Awards	9 March 2024	Breakthrough Performance of the Year Male	Kartik Aaryan	Won	
News 18 Reel Awards	9 March 2024	Best Supporting Actor	Gajraj Rao	Nominated	
Zee Cine Awards	10 March 2024	Best Actress Viewers Choice	Kiara Advani	Won	
Zee Cine Awards	10 March 2024	Best Actress Critics	Kiara Advani	Nominated	
Zee Cine Awards	10 March 2024	Performer of the Year Male	Kartik Aaryan	Won	
Bollywood Film Journalists’ Awards	16 March 2024	Best Actor (Female)	Kiara Advani	Nominated	
Pinkvilla Screen and Style Icons Awards	18 March 2024	Best Actress (Popular Choice)	Kiara Advani	Won	
Pinkvilla Screen and Style Icons Awards	18 March 2024	Best Actress (Jury's Choice)	Kiara Advani	Nominated	
Pinkvilla Screen and Style Icons Awards	18 March 2024	Best Actor (Popular Choice)	Kartik Aaryan	Nominated	
