= Shah Jahan on a Terrace, Holding a Pendant Set With His Portrait =

17th-century Indian painting

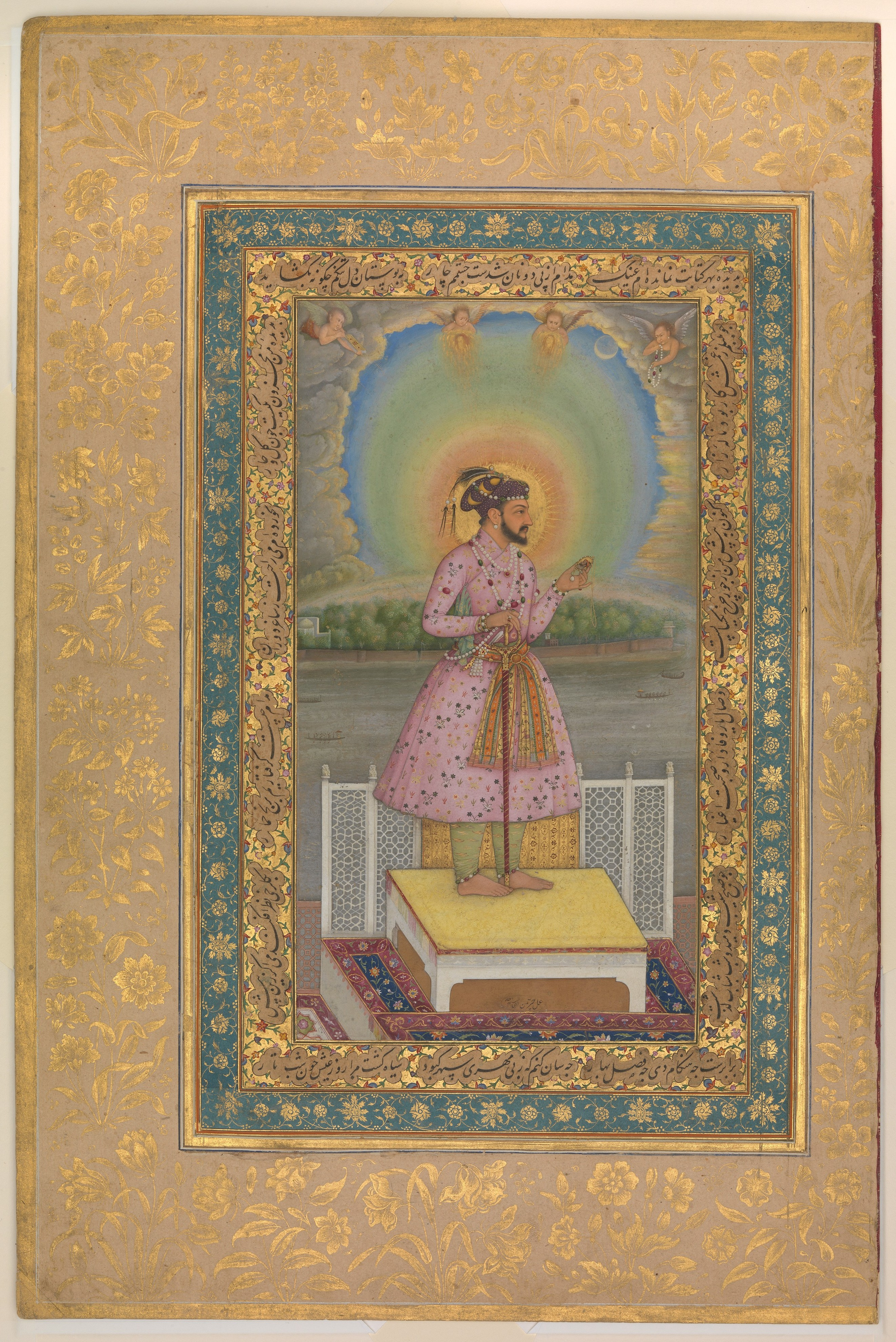
- Artist: Chitarman
- Medium: Ink, opaque watercolor, and gold on paper
- Dimensions: 38.9 cm × 25.7 cm (15.3 in × 10.1 in)
- Location: The Metropolitan Museum of Art

Shah Jahan on a Terrace, Holding a Pendant Set With His Portrait is a 17th-century miniature painting of the Mughal school. A folio taken from the Shah Jahan Album, it is now in the Metropolitan Museum of Art.

== Background ==
Shah Jahan acceded to the throne of the Mughal empire in 1628. This picture, which was painted shortly after his accession, might have been intended as an imperial gift. Stylistically, it is an amplification of the formula for imperial portraiture developed during the reign of his predecessors Jahangir and Akbar. It is attributed to the court artist Chitarman, and is his earliest dated work.

== Description ==
The subject of the painting is the emperor Shah Jahan, who stands upon a carpeted platform. Behind him is a railing with latticed screens, topped with elephant-shaped finials. Beyond the railing is the Yamuna river, upon which barges are seen in the distance. On the other side of the river is a dense garden containing pavilions. Mughal craftsmanship is displayed in the platform and the railing, both made out of white marble, as well as the carpet. The work of Mughal shipwrights and architects are represented in the barrages crossing the river and the pavilions in the garden.

The emperor holds a pendant studded with gems, containing his own portrait. He is dressed in a pink jama and a golden sash. He is adorned with a band of pearls and jewels in the form of a sahra, which is a veil worn by Muslim bridegrooms. Ali S. Asani interprets this band as an allusion to one of the attributes of the Hindu god Vishnu. One of Vishnu's epithets is "king of the world", which has the same meaning as the emperor's regnal name Shah Jahan.

Surrounding the emperor's head is a sun-like halo, which is itself surrounded by several rings of various colors. The halo parts the clouds in the sky, in a manner similar to curtains. At the top are four putti, seemingly descending from the heavens, who present divine flames as well as jewels to the emperor.

The painting is composed of three distinct registers. The lowest register contains the carpeted platform and the railing. The middle register consists of the river. Finally, the upper register contains the emperor's halo as well as the sky.

The painting is surrounded by three borders. The innermost border contains a qit'a of poetic verses. This is followed by the inner border, which contains floral forms. The outer border contains golden plants, painted on a pale background.

== Reception ==
Stuart Cary Welch describes the work as the "most flamboyant portrait of Shah Jahan". He states that it is so excessive in its depiction of the emperor's glory, that some critics have doubted the work's authenticity.
