= Zee Cine Award for Performer of the Year – Male =

Hindi film award

Zee Cine Award for Performer of the Year Male
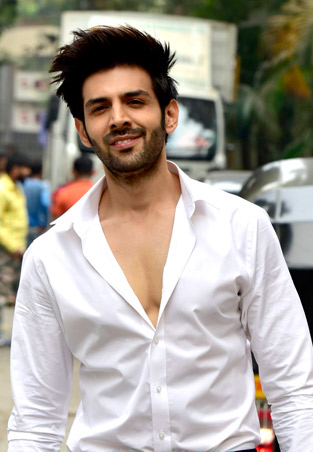
- The 2024 recipient: Kartik Aaryan
- Awarded for: Best Performer of the Year Male by an Actor
- Country: India
- Presented by: Zee; Maruti Suzuki
- Currently held by: Kartik Aaryan, Satyaprem Ki Katha (2024)
- Website: Zee Cine Awards

The Zee Cine Special Award for Hot & Techy Performer of the Year – Male is chosen by a jury organized by Zee Entertainment Enterprises, Maruti Suzuki and the winner is announced only at the ceremony. It was first awarded in 2023, The recent recipient is Kartik Aaryan.

== List of winners ==
=== 2020s ===
Year	Actor	Film	Character
2023
2023	Varun Dhawan	Bhediya	Bhaskar Sharma
2024
2024	Kartik Aaryan	Satyaprem Ki Katha	Satyaprem Panchal

== See also ==
- Zee Cine Awards
- Bollywood
- Cinema of India
