= Kithay Nain =

2015 song performed by Reshma

Single by Reshma
- Genre: Punjabi-folk
- Length: 4:42
- Label: Shalimar Records
- Songwriter: Manzur Jhalla

Music video
- "Kithay Nain" on YouTube

"Kithay Nain" is a Punjabi folk song written by Manzur Jhalla and recorded by Pakistani singer Reshma. It became one of the most popular Punjabi songs sung by Reshma and has been reproduced, rendered and sung by many artists including Fariha Pervez, Alka Yagnik and Ali Sethi.

== Ali Sethi version ==
"Kithay Nain"

Single by Ali Sethi
- Released: February 11, 2015
- Recorded: 2015
- Genre: Punjabi-folk
- Length: 5:10
- Label: White Frog Works
- Songwriter: Manzur Jhalla
- Producer: Saad Sultan

Music video
- "Kithay Nain" on YouTube

The song was rerecorded by Ali Sethi as a tribute to Reshma, composed by Saad Sultan and Syed Umar Ali it received widespread acclaim. The video of the song was directed by Sarmad Sultan Khoosat and Saim Sadiq and features Sethi himself with his sister Mira Sethi and actors Sania Saeed and Adnan Siddiqui. It was nominated for Best Music Single for Ali and Hum Award for Best Music Video for Sarmad.

=== Music video ===
"Kithay Nain Na Jori" was released in February at Karachi Literature Festival featuring Sethi himself, starring Sania Saeed, Adnan Siddiqui and Ali's sister Mira Sethi as a tribute to Reshma. Sethi said, "Reshma ji's song is so powerful that today everyone is ready to do anything to bring it back." explaining his tribute to singer he expressed, "It's been a miraculous journey. All of us who have worked on the song have been touched by something really special. Everything – from recording to finding musicians and the shooting – came together at the end and it's because of our love for the song. The song belongs to Reshma ji."

=== Synopsis ===
Protagonist (Sania Saeed) is happily married to a man (Adnan Siddiqui) who seems to be faithful too. Until she discovered a love letter written by (Mira Sethi) with whom protagonist is having an affair with and finds out that whenever he goes out of the city he lives with her. She decides to take revenge, protagonist husband comes home, just to open the door, she shoots him and wander in whole house reminisce their memories.

=== Cast and crew ===
Following is the list of brief artist that work with this record:

- Singer: Ali Sethi
- Featuring Artist: Ali Sethi, Sania Saeed, Adnan Siddiqui and Mira Sethi
- Lyricist: Manzoor Jhalla
- Music video director: Sarmad Sultan Khoosat and Saim Sadiq
- Video Editor: Syed Umair Ali
- Record Producers: White Frog Works

Personnel

- Composer: Syed Umer Ali and Saad Sultan
- Percussions: Asif Ali (Goga)
- Cello: Ghulam Abbas
- Piano: Anthony Soshil
- Guitar: Saad Sultan

=== Track listing ===
- Digital download (2015 version)

"Kithay Nain" featuring Ali Sethi, Sania Saeed, Adnan Siddiqui and Mira Sethi — 5:10

=== Accolades ===
The single receives following nomination at 2016 Hum Awards:

| Year | Award | Category | Recipient(s) | Result |
|---|---|---|---|---|
| 2016 | 4th Hum Awards | Best Music Single | Ali Sethi | Nominated |
| 2016 | 4th Hum Awards | Hum Award for Best Music Video | Sarmad Sultan Khoosat | Nominated |

== See also ==
- "Sajna" by Uzair Jaswal
