= The Wish Maker =

2009 novel by Ali Sethi

- First edition cover (US Hardback)
- Author: Ali Sethi
- Language: English
- Genre: Fiction; Drama
- Publisher: Riverhead Books (USA); Penguin Books (India); Hamish Hamilton (UK)
- Publication date: June 11, 2009
- Pages: 432
- ISBN: 978-1-59448-875-7

The Wish Maker is the first, and so far only, novel by Pakistani-American author Ali Sethi. Published in 2009 by Riverhead Books, it tells the story of Zaki Shirazi, a young boy from the United States who returns to Lahore, Pakistan to celebrate the wedding of his childhood friend, Samar Api. The story is set against the backdrop of tumultuous events, from the Zia-ul-Haq reign to Zulfiqar Bhutto's execution and Benazir Bhutto's election as the prime minister of Pakistan. It also depicts and comments on the United States’ support of the Afghan mujahideen during the Soviet military intervention in Afghanistan.

The Wish Maker has been often compared with Khaled Hosseini's The Kite Runner, due to its similar tone to Hosseini's tale which depicts the pre-revolutionary Afghanistan with warmth and humour despite the tense political undercurrent. Sethi has commented that he considered the name of the book, The Wish Maker, "so important" because it describes "to what he was trying to say". The political themes, social concerns, family relationships and 90s' era of Lahore is prominent throughout the novel.

== Synopsis ==
Zaki Shirazi has arrived back in Lahore, Pakistan, to celebrate the wedding of his childhood friend and elder cousin Samar Api to her long sought-after 'Amitabh' - a stand-in for the Bollywood star she always dreamed of marrying. Amidst the flurry of preparations in the house in which he grew up, Zaki can't help but revisit the past - his childhood as a fatherless boy growing up in a household of outspoken women and his and Samar's intertwined journeys from youth to adulthood. Raised to consider themselves 'part of the same litter', Zaki and Samar watched American television together, memorized dialogues from Bollywood movies and attended dangerous protests with Zaki's campaigning, political journalist mother. But as Zaki becomes drawn into Samar's secret life of romantic schemes and lends her his support in trying to orchestrate the future, they both find themselves suffering the consequences.

== Characters ==
- Zaki Shirazi
- Naseem
- Zakia
- Samar Api
- Tara Tanvir
- Saif
- Uzma
- Kazim
- Jamal

== Reception ==
"The Wish Maker, in Ali Sethi's mature and sure-handed prose, is an engaging family saga, an absorbing coming-of-age story, and an illuminating look at one of the world's most turbulent regions. Ali Sethi steadfastly resists the usual cliché's about both Islam and his native country. Instead, he offers a nuanced, often humorous, and always novel look at life in modern day Pakistan."
– Khaled Hosseini reviewed The Wish Maker

The Wish Maker received widespread acclaim and recognition. It was ranked on no. 8 at Vogue Top Ten Summer Books. The book has been translated into Italian, Dutch, German, Hindi, Chinese and Turkish language.

In a review, The New York Times called it "a first-rate novel", stating that "Sethi's prose evokes the comic mislocutions of Jonathan Safran Foer and the vertiginous mania of Zadie Smith. The Wall Street Journal stated that, "Mr. Sethi is especially alive to the emotional contours of young love, its modes of courtship, its methods of subterfuge... Mr. Sethi's prose, always lucid, often soars to illuminate the quotidian." Arifa Akbar of The Independent also reviewed the book positively saying, "Sethi's narration is engaging and funny, and although it rambles off into distracted corners at times, it is slickly structured. It takes us from the present day, back across personal and political histories, and returns to a bittersweet ending which reminds us of the power of making wishes and the miracle of having them, even in part, fulfilled."

Writing for Dawn News Mehar Khursheed wrote, "A commendable quality in the novel was the way in which a child’s point of view is presented to the reader, as it takes one back to the insecurity that comes with the smallness of age and stature. For a debut novel, it is not too indecent an effort. However, English literature from Pakistan will always have a lot at stake as the audience and the expectation to deliver the culture, times and region one has set out to represent, responsibly and honestly, is twofold."

The novel was long-listed for the 2011 DSC Prize for South Asian Literature but couldn't made it to the final six nominations, ultimately losing to H. M. Naqvi's, Home Boy. It was also shortlisted for 2010 Shakti Bhatt First Book Award.

== Awards ==
Year	Awards	Category	Result	Ref(s)
2010	Shakti Bhatt Awards	Shakti Bhatt First Book Prize	Nominated	
2010	DSC Prize for South Asian Literature		Short-listed	
