= Shae Gill =

Pakistani singer (born 1999)

- شے گِل
- Born: Anushae Babar Gill; 2 September 1999 (age 27); Lahore, Punjab, Pakistan
- Education: Forman Christian College
- Occupations: Singer; Artist
- Years active: 2022–present
- Height: 1.78 m (5 ft 10 in)
- Musical career
- Genres: Folk; Romantic; Pop; Classical; Alternative music
- Instrument: Vocals

Anushae Babar Gill (Note: Punjabi, Urdu: انوشے بابر گِل) (Punjabi pronunciation: [ənuːˈʃeː baːˈbəɾ ɡɪl]; born 2 September 1999), professionally known as Shae Gill (Punjabi: [ʃeː ɡɪl]), is a Pakistani singer, mostly working in Punjabi and Urdu music industry. She rose to prominence after her world-famous Punjabi-Urdu duet song "Pasoori" with Ali Sethi, in Coke Studio season 14.

== Early life ==
Shae Gill was born on 2 September 1999 in Lahore, Punjab, to a Jat Punjabi Christian family hailing from the Gill clan. She was raised in Lahore and attended the Forman Christian College.

== Career ==
Shae Gill started her career as a cover-artist on Instagram in 2019. She mainly posted cover songs on Instagram, before releasing her Punjabi-Urdu debut original duet "Pasoori" with Ali Sethi, in Coke Studio. This song brought her immense popularity from around the world.

== Discography ==
=== Lead artist ===
Title		Year	Music producer	Label
Roman	Nastaliq	Year	Music producer	Label
"Left Right"	"لیفٹ رائیٹ"	2023	Abdullah Siddiqui	Ali Sethi
"Pasoori"	"پسوڑی"	2022	Zulfiqar Jabbar Khan & Abdullah Siddiqui	Coke Studio

=== Featured artist ===
Title		Year	Music producer	Album
Roman	Nastaliq	Year	Music producer	Album
"Sukoon"	"سکون"	2022	Hassan & Roshaan	"Day ۵"

Title		Year	Music Producer	Director
Roman	Nastaliq	Year	Music Producer	Director
"Mera Sawera"	"میرا سویرا"	2023	Coke Studio	Zulfiqar Jabbar Khan

Title		Year	Producer(s)	Co-singer
Roman	Nastaliq	Year	Producer(s)	Co-singer
"Bulleya"	"بُلّھیا"	2023	Asim Azhar, Sulaman Naseer & Haider Ali	Asim Azhar

=== Television soundtrack ===
Title		Year	Network	Co-singer
Roman	Nastaliq	Year	Network	Co-singer
"Dil-e-Veeran"	"دل ویران"	2022	ARY Digital	-
"Aa Miley Ho Yunhi"	"آ ملے ہو یونہی"	2023	Hum TV	Sami Khan
