= Reshma (singer) =

Pakistani folk singer (c.1947-2013)

- ریشماں
- Born: c.1947 Loha (Malasi) Ratangarh, Churu, Rajasthan, India
- Died: 3 November 2013 (aged 66); Lahore, Punjab, Pakistan
- Other name: Reshman
- Occupation: Folk singer
- Years active: 1968– 2004
- Awards: Pride of Performance Award by the President of Pakistan in 1982; Sitara-i-Imtiaz (Star of Excellence) Award by the Government of Pakistan in 2008

Reshma (Urdu: ریشماں; c. 1947 – 3 November 2013) was a Pakistani folk singer. A recipient of the Sitara-i-Imtiaz (Star of Distinction), the third highest civilian award in Pakistan, among other honours, she is remembered for her rendition of folk songs and her powerful singing voice.

Born in Rajasthan, India in a nomadic Banjara household in 1947, her family relocated to Karachi after the Partition of India. Discovered by a local producer at the age of twelve while singing at the shrine of Lal Shahbaz Qalandar in Sehwan, Sindh, Reshma went on to record various folk songs for such labels as the Pakistan Radio. Her first project with the company "Laal Meri" was an instant hit and she was catapulted to fame with several television appearances in the 1960s.

Reshma went on to record songs for both the Pakistani and Indian film industry. Some of her most memorable songs include "Laal Meri", "Hai O Rabba Nahion Lagda Dil Mera", "Ankhiyan Nu Rehen De" and "Lambi Judai" among others. She died on 3 November 2013 in Lahore, Pakistan, after suffering from throat cancer for several years.

== Early life ==
Reshma was born in the village of Loha, Ratangarh, Churu near Bikaner, Rajasthan around 1947. Her father, Haji Muhammad Mushtaq, was a camel and horse trader from Malashi. She belonged to a tribe which had converted to Islam. Her tribe migrated to Karachi shortly after the Partition of India, when she was just one month old.

She did not receive any formal education and spent much of her childhood singing at the mazars (shrines) of the mystic saints of Sindh, Pakistan. She married Muhammad Khan who was from within her extended family.

== Career ==
Reshma was spotted, at the age of 12, singing at the Shrine of Lal Shahbaz Qalandar by then Pakistani television and radio producer, Saleem Gilani. Gilani arranged for her to make a recording of "Lal Meri Pat Rakhio" on Radio Pakistan in 1968. She became an instant hit and since that day, Reshma has been one of the most popular folk singers of Pakistan, and garnered international renown. Reshma had been appearing on television since 1968, recording songs for both the Pakistani and Indian film industries, and performing in live concerts at home and abroad.

Some of her famous songs are "Dama Dam Mast Kalandar", "Hai O' Rabba nahion lagda dil mera", "Sun charkhe di mithi mithi khook mahiya meinu yaad aunda", "Wey main chori chori teray naal laayyan akhhian" (song lyrics by renowned Punjabi poet Manzoor Hussain Jhalla ), "Kithay Nain Na Jori", "Lambi Judai" and "Ankhiyan nu rehen de ankhyan de kol kol".

The above song was used by Raj Kapoor in his film Bobby, "Ankhyon ko rehne de ankhyon ke aas pass", sung by Lata Mangeshkar. Her fame had crossed the border, thanks to pirated tapes. She was able to perform live in India much later, during the 1980s when India and Pakistan allowed exchange of artists. Subhash Ghai used her voice in the film Hero, which featured one of her most famous songs, "Lambi Judai".

During her career she was invited to meet Indian Prime Minister, Indira Gandhi.

In 2004, she recorded "Ashkan Di Gali Vich Mukaam De Gaya", which was used in the Bollywood film Woh Tera Naam Tha, and was also a hit record in India.

In January 2006, she was one of the passengers on the inaugural Lahore-Amritsar bus, the first such service linking both parts of the Punjab since 1947. The bus had 26 passengers in total of whom 15 were Pakistani officials, and Reshma had booked seven seats for herself and her family. Reshma planned to give many performances in India on this tour.

Her last residence was in the area of Ichhra in Lahore, Pakistan.

Her younger sister, Kaneez Reshma is also a professional singer.

== Health issues and death ==
Reshma was diagnosed with throat cancer in the 1980s. In later years, her health deteriorated, leading President Pervez Musharraf to come to her aid, giving her one million Rupees to help pay off a bank loan, as well as putting her on a secured assistance of 10,000 rupees per month. He also helped her secure a plot of land for herself, but that did not go through due to the change in government.

Her health deteriorated to such an extent that she was hospitalised in Lahore, Pakistan in 'Doctors Hospital' on 6 April 2013. The Punjab, Pakistan caretaker government elected to pay all her medical expenses. Tell her that she has lost weight and she promptly replies, "To kyā? Maiṅ is se slim, smart bhī to ho gaī." (So what? I have grown slim and smart because of this), but then explains, "Doctors have advised me to curtail oily and spicy food." She readily used to admit, "I have no training in classical music, I do not know even the 'r' of any raga. So when I sing and miss any technical aspect, please forgive me," is what this humble soul used to say to the audience. "For me, there is no difference between India and Pakistan, they are like my two eyes."

Reshma fell into a coma in October 2013 and died on 3 November 2013 in a Lahore hospital.

== Awards and tributes ==
- Sitara-i-Imtiaz (Star of Excellence) awarded by the President of Pakistan in 2008, for her services to the nation.
- Pride of Performance Award in 1982 by the Government of Pakistan
- In 2000 at PTV Award Reshma received Best Singer award

A journalist from Karachi, Pakistan, Murtaza Solangi who also used to work for Radio Pakistan, had arranged for Reshma's performances at different radio stations in the 1970s, said," How could I forget Reshma? In my youthful years, her voice always enriched me and she connected Rajasthan, Cholistan and Sindh. She was a flower of the desert, symbol of love, music and peace".
