= Kiara Advani =

Indian actress (born 1991)

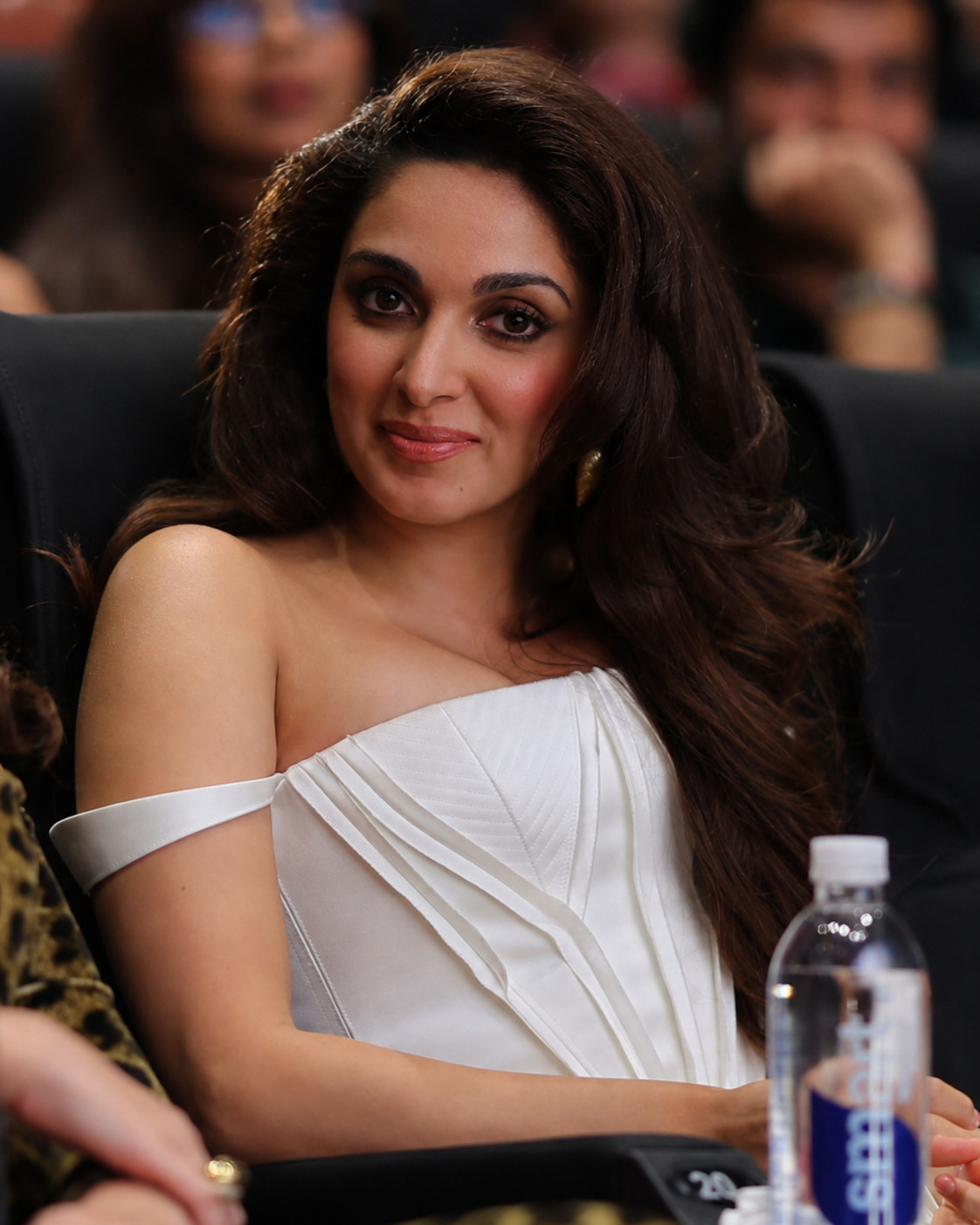
- Advani in 2026
- Born: Alia Advani; 31 July 1991 (age 35); Bombay, Maharashtra, India
- Education: Jai Hind College, Mumbai, Maharashtra
- Occupation: Actress
- Years active: 2014–present
- Spouse: Sidharth Malhotra (m. 2023)
- Children: 1
- Awards: Full list

Kiara Advani (Note: Sindhi pronunciation: [kɪjɑːɾɑ ɑːɗʋɑːɳiː].) (born Alia Advani, 31 July 1991) is an Indian actress who works primarily in Hindi films. One of the highest-paid actresses in India, Advani is a recipient of several accolades including an IIFA Award and two Zee Cine Awards, alongside nominations for two Filmfare Awards.

Following a brief career in teaching, Advani made her acting debut with the unremarkable comedy film Fugly (2014). Two years later, she starred as MS Dhoni's wife in the commercially successful sports biopic M.S. Dhoni: The Untold Story (2016). She gained critical appreciation for playing a sexually unsatisfied wife in the Netflix anthology film Lust Stories (2018) and played the leading lady in the political thriller Bharat Ane Nenu (2018), which was followed by a brief setback.

The romantic drama Kabir Singh (2019) marked a turning point in her career, and she gained further success with the comedy drama Good Newwz, two of the highest-grossing Hindi films of 2019. She won the IIFA Award for Best Supporting Actress for the latter. She rose to prominence with commercially successful 2022 films—the horror comedy Bhool Bhulaiyaa 2 and the family drama Jugjugg Jeeyo. Advani received critical praise for playing Vikram Batra's girlfriend in the war film Shershaah (2021) and a troubled married woman in the romantic drama Satyaprem Ki Katha (2023), receiving nominations for Filmfare Award for Best Actress for both these films. This success was followed by three poorly-received big-budget action films.

In addition to her acting career, she is the celebrity endorser for several brands and products. Advani is married to actor Sidharth Malhotra, with whom she has a daughter, Saraayah.

== Early life and background ==
Advani was born on 31 July 1991, to Jagdeep Advani, a Sindhi Hindu businessman and Genevieve Jaffrey, a teacher whose father was originally from Lucknow and whose mother was of Scottish, Irish, Portuguese, and Spanish ancestry. She has a younger brother, Mishaal, who is a musician. She is related to several celebrities through her maternal family. Actors Ashok Kumar and Saeed Jaffrey are her step-great-grandfather and great-uncle, respectively.

Advani was educated at Cathedral and John Connon School, Mumbai. She then attended Jai Hind College, Mumbai where she graduated with a Bachelor of Arts degree in mass communications.

Born as Alia Advani, she changed her first name to Kiara prior to the release of her first film, Fugly, in 2014. (Note: She changed her first name to Kiara prior to the release of her first film.) Her choice of name was inspired by Priyanka Chopra's character Kiara in the film Anjaana Anjaani (2010). She stated that it was Salman Khan's suggestion to change her name, as Alia Bhatt was already an established actress.

== Career ==
=== Early work and struggle (2014–2019) ===
Advani began her acting career with the ensemble comedy film Fugly (2014) alongside newcomer Mohit Marwah. Mehul S Thakkar of Deccan Chronicle found her "very striking" and said that she "shows a lot of promise". Fugly underperformed at the box office but she received a nomination at the Screen Awards for Best Female Debut. Advani admitted to feeling demotivated after the film's failure as film offers became scarce.

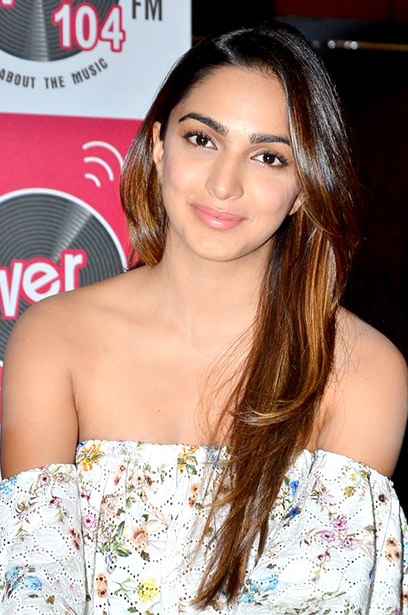
Advani promoting M.S. Dhoni:The Untold Story in 2016

Two years later, Advani appeared in the sports drama M.S. Dhoni: The Untold Story (2016), a biopic of cricketer MS Dhoni who served as a former captain of Indian cricket team. She had a supporting role opposite Sushant Singh Rajput (who essayed Dhoni), as the real-life character of his wife, hotel manager Sakshi Rawat. M. S. Dhoni: The Untold Story was a major commercial success with global revenues of over ₹216 crore (US$23 million). She next appeared in Abbas–Mustan's action thriller Machine (2017). Critic Taran Adarsh felt that Advani had shown potential in a mediocre film. It failed at the box office. She next collaborated with filmmaker Karan Johar, for their first of many films, in the Netflix anthological film Lust Stories (2018), where she starred opposite Vicky Kaushal as his sexually dissatisfied wife. Writing for NDTV, Raja Sen found her to be "positively lovely" in it.

Advani expanded to Telugu cinema in 2018, appearing with Mahesh Babu in the action film Bharat Ane Nenu from Koratala Siva, about a student who unexpectedly becomes the chief minister of Andhra Pradesh. Janani K of India Today opined that she "shines in her brief role" but added that her character was "more of an eye-candy who doesn't add any purpose to the story". The film grossed ₹225 crore (US$24 million) worldwide, making it one of Telugu cinema's highest grossers. She, however, failed to replicate this success with her second Telugu film, Vinaya Vidheya Rama, co-starring Ram Charan. In a scathing review for The Hindu, Sangeetha Devi Dundoo wrote, "It isn't Kiara Advani's fault that she looks lost in the melee." In the same year, she had a guest appearance in Abhishek Varman's ensemble period film Kalank, produced by Johar.

=== Rise to prominence (2019–2023) ===
Advani received wider attention later in 2019 for Sandeep Reddy Vanga's romantic drama Kabir Singh, starring Shahid Kapoor. The film had a worldwide gross of over ₹378 crore (US$40 million) becoming her highest-grossing release, but critics panned it due to its depiction of misogyny and toxic masculinity. Rajeev Masand bemoaned that her passive character "offers the actress little to work with". She then starred in the comedy Good Newwz alongside Akshay Kumar, Kareena Kapoor Khan and Diljit Dosanjh, about two couples tryst with in vitro fertilization. Namrata Joshi opined, "Dosanjh and Advani are all about the amplification of the boisterous, kitschy Punjabi stereotype but they play it with an infectious cheer." Both Kabir Singh and Good Newwz grossed over ₹200 crores each domestically, ranking among the year's highest-grossing films. She won the IIFA Award for Best Supporting Actress for her performance in Good Newwz.

In 2020, Advani starred in Johar's production Guilty, a Netflix film about sexual assault. She played Nanki Dutta, a troubled college student. While Ektaa Malik of The Indian Express believed that she had been "reduced to the 'tortured-artistic-creative' types", Rohan Nahaar of Hindustan Times commended her "absolutely electric performance as the unreliable Nanki". Advani was nominated for Best Actress in a Web Original Film at Filmfare OTT Awards. She then played the wife of Akshay Kumar's character in Raghava Lawrence's horror comedy Laxmii, in which Kumar's character gets possessed by a transgender ghost. Laxmii was released digitally on Disney+ Hotstar owing to the COVID-19 pandemic, and met with negative reviews. Even so, it attained a strong viewership on the platform. In her final release of 2020, Advani starred in the unremarkable romantic comedy Indoo Ki Jawani (2020). While praising her look and styling in the film, The Times of India's Ronak Kotecha was unimpressed with Advani's comic timing. It failed commercially.

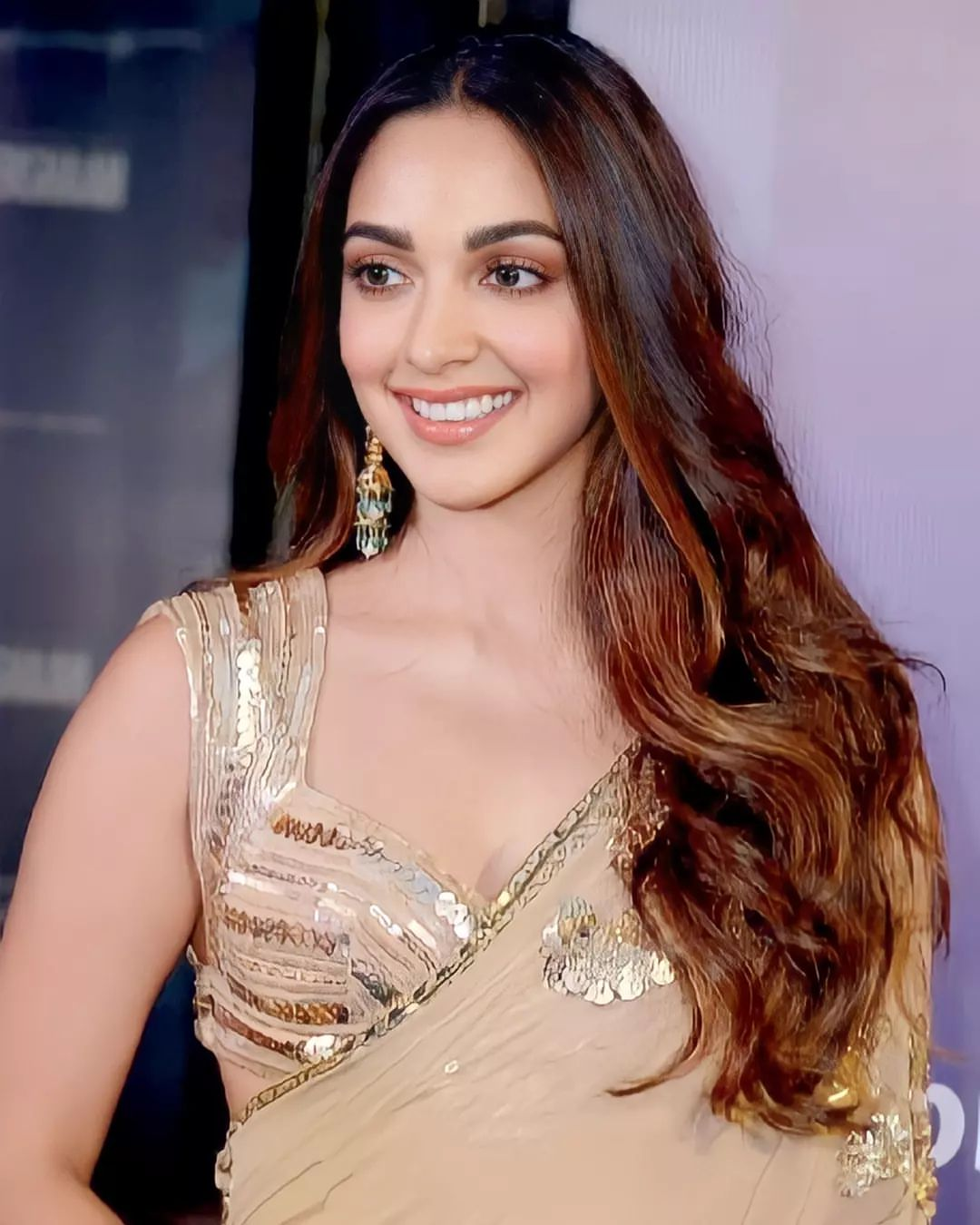
Advani at the screening of Shershaah in 2021

Advani next featured in the war film Shershaah (2021), based on the life of army officer Vikram Batra (played by Sidharth Malhotra), in which she played Dimple Cheema, Batra's girlfriend. The film released digitally on Amazon Prime Video, on which it became the most-streamed Indian film. Anna M. M. Vetticad of Firstpost opined that Advani "sparkles" in her brief role. She received a nomination for the Filmfare Award for Best Actress. The following year, she appeared with Tabu and Kartik Aaryan in the comedy horror film Bhool Bhulaiyaa 2. Shalini Langer of The Indian Express wrote that she "has little to do except pop up now and then". The film emerged as one of her most commercially successful, with worldwide earnings of over ₹2.6 billion (US$28 million). Advani starred alongside an ensemble cast in Jugjugg Jeeyo, a comedy-drama about divorce, in which Varun Dhawan and her played an unhappily married couple. Writing for Hindustan Times, Monika Rawal Kukreja commended her "restrained performance" in it. It earned ₹1.35 billion (US$14 million) worldwide.

She then starred in the comic thriller Govinda Naam Mera, with Vicky Kaushal and Bhumi Pednekar, which released digitally on Disney+ Hotstar. Sukanya Verma of Rediff.com opined that "Kiara Advani's energy is capable of far more heavy lifting than it gets credit for." Advani reunited with Kartik Aaryan in Satyaprem Ki Katha (2023), a romantic drama about a troubled marriage. Scroll.in's Nandini Ramnath found her "sensitive, soulful" performance to be "affecting", adding that she "displays further evidence of her growing confidence". It emerged as a modest commercial success. Advani received several Best Actress awards and nominations at various ceremonies including her second Filmfare nomination.

=== Big-budget action films and commercial setback (2025–present) ===
In 2025, Advani starred in two action films, Game Changer and War 2, each made on a ₹4 billion (US$43 million) budget, making them among the most expensive Indian films ever made. In Game Changer, a Telugu action film directed by S. Shankar, Advani starred opposite Ram Charan. Firstpost's Vinamra Mathur bemoaned that she had been wasted in an "inconsequential romantic track". Despite disliking the film, Sangeetha Devi of The Hindu credited Advani for trying to "deliver the best" she can in a role that "occasionally goes beyond being decorative". Advani starred as a wing commander opposite Hrithik Roshan in Ayan Mukerji's War 2, set in the YRF Spy Universe. In a negative review for The Indian Express, Shubhra Gupta lamented the absence of "an actual fleshed-out role" for Advani in what she described as a "boys-and-their-toys flick". Similarly, News18’s Titas Chowdhury noted that the actress had been "relegated to the periphery," though she praised her skill in the action sequences. War 2 had the highest opening weekend of her career, yet both it and Game Changer emerged as box-office bombs.

Advani continued her work in actions films in 2026 when she made her foray into Kannada cinema opposite Yash with filmmaker Geetu Mohandas's gangster drama Toxic. For her role as a circus artist, she underwent extensive training with international performers to master Cirque du Soleil-style aerial routines and stunts. Advani continued shooting for the film while six months pregnant to avoid delays in filming. Similar to her releases the previous year, the film was panned by critics, but WION's Shomini Sen remarked that "If there is something to look forward to at all in Toxic, it is Advani’s performance". It was another box-office bomb for the actress.

== Personal life ==
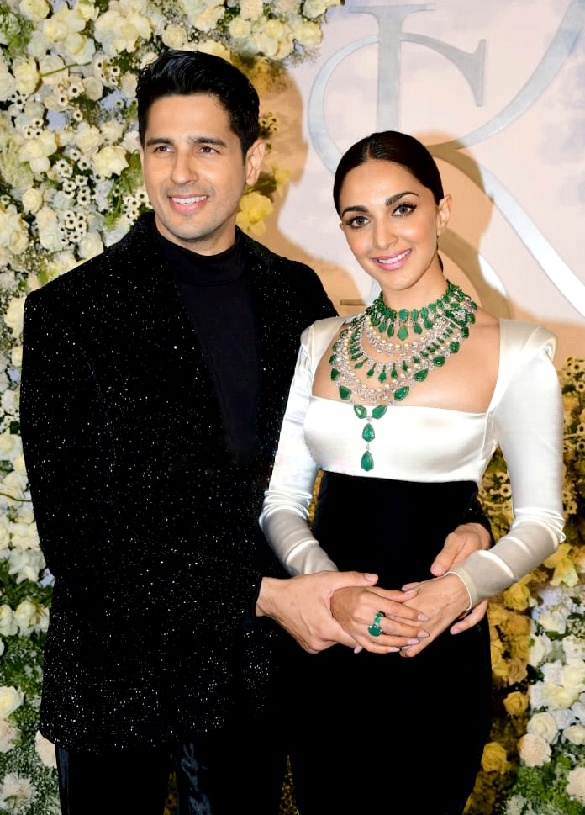
Advani with her husband Sidharth Malhotra at their wedding reception in 2023

Despite persistent rumours of a relationship with actor Sidharth Malhotra since 2020, Advani did not publicly comment on it. They were married on 7 February 2023 in a traditional Hindu ceremony in Jaisalmer, Rajasthan. The wedding attracted significant media coverage, with their photos becoming the most-liked Instagram post in India. Advani gave birth to their daughter, Saraayah, on 15 July 2025.

== Other work and media image ==
Raghuvendra Singh of Filmfare finds Advani to be "charming, vivacious and always full on energy". Shama Bhagat of The New Indian Express notes, "After almost written off by critics after her debut film, Advani had taken the failure in her stride and is evidently on a success spree with hit after hit."

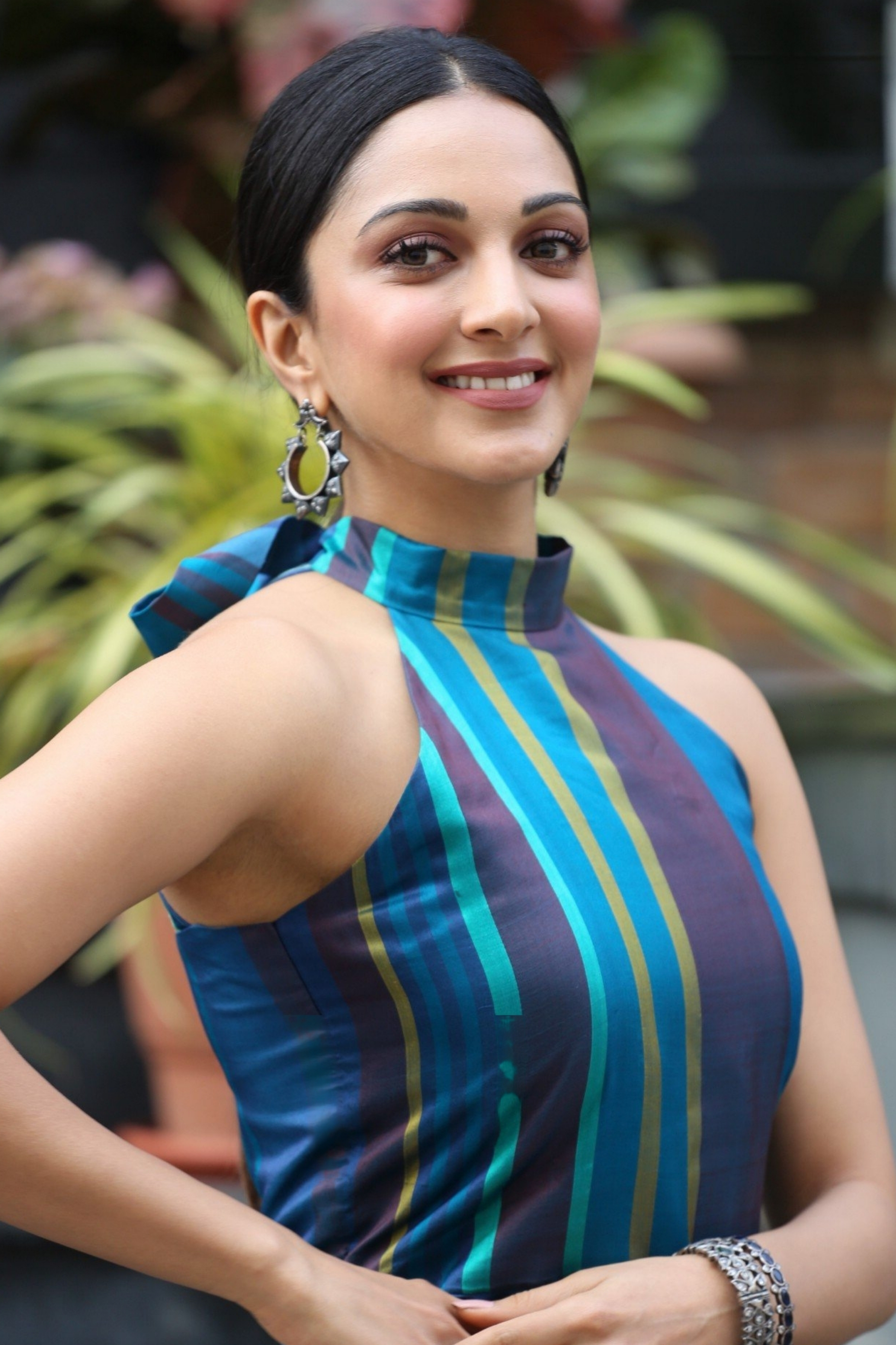
Advani at an event in 2019

Advani is one of the highest paid actresses in India. She has featured in The Times of India's listing of the "Most Desirable Woman", ranking sixth in 2019 and fourth in 2020. In 2019 and 2022, Rediff.com placed her at fourth and seventh, respectively, in their listing of the top 10 Popular Stars of Bollywood Cinema. In 2021, Advani was listed in the Most-in demand actors across the globe, Notably, she were the only female actress making her way to the list only behind Priyanka Chopra Jonas. In 2022, GQ India ranked Advani in their "30 Most Influential Young Indians" listings and named her one of the best dressed celebrities in the country. In 2023, Advani became the most searched personality on Google in India. In 2024, she was placed 33rd on IMDb's List of 100 Most Viewed Indian Stars. As of 2024, she is among India's highest tax-paying celebrities.

Advani is an endorser for several brands and products, including Audi, Galaxy Chocolate, Colgate, and Slice. In 2019, she took part in a campaign as brand ambassador for Giordano handbags. In 2020, she collaborated with Myntra and in 2022, she was signed by the Spanish retailer Mango for an Indian campaign. In 2023, Reliance Retail's beauty brand Tira and Quaker Oats Company signed her as an ambassador. Advani's brand value was estimated by Kroll Inc. (formerly Duff & Phelps) to be US$60 million in 2023, the twelfth-highest among Indian celebrities and third-highest among actresses.

Advani supports a number of social causes. She promoted the "Quaker Feed A Child" initiative of Smile Foundation and also supported The Quint's initiative #SpreadTheLight. During COVID-19 crisis, she donated to the "I Stand With Humanity" campaign, to help daily wage workers of the film and television industry. Advani has performed on stage and co-hosted at the Filmfare, Screen and Zee Cine award ceremonies. In March 2023, she performed at the opening ceremony of the Women's Premier League alongside Kriti Sanon and AP Dhillon. In October that year, she performed at an event in Doha for the "Entertainer No. 1" tour, alongside Shahid Kapoor, Varun Dhawan, Tiger Shroff, Rakul Preet Singh, Jacqueline Fernandez and Ash King.

== Filmography ==
Key
†	Denotes films that have not yet been released

=== Films ===
- All films are in Hindi unless otherwise noted.

Year	Title	Role	Notes	Ref.
2014	Fugly	Devika Sharma		
2016	M.S. Dhoni: The Untold Story	Sakshi Rawat		
2017	Machine	Sarah Thapar		
2018	Bharat Ane Nenu	Vasumathi	Telugu film	
2018	Lust Stories	Megha Upadhyay	Karan Johar's segment	
2019	Vinaya Vidheya Rama	Seetha	Telugu film	
2019	Kalank	Lajjo	Special appearance	
2019	Kabir Singh	Preeti Sikka		
2019	Good Newwz	Monika Batra		
2020	Guilty	Nanki Dutta		
2020	Laxmii	Rashmi Rajput		
2020	Indoo Ki Jawani	Indoo Gupta		
2021	Shershaah	Dimple Cheema		
2022	Bhool Bhulaiyaa 2	Reet Thakur		
2022	Jugjugg Jeeyo	Nainaa Sharma		
2022	Govinda Naam Mera	Suku Shetty		
2023	Satyaprem Ki Katha	Katha Kapadia		
2025	Game Changer	Dr. Deepika	Telugu film	
2025	War 2	Wing Commander Kavya Luthra		
2026	Toxic	Nadia	Kannada-English bilingual film	

=== Television ===
Year	Title	Role	Notes	Ref.
2018	Masaba Masaba	Herself	Cameo appearance	

=== Music video appearances ===
Year	Title	Singer(s)	Ref.
2018	"Urvashi"	Yo Yo Honey Singh	
2020	"Kudi Nu Nachne De"	Vishal Dadlani, Sachin–Jigar	
2020	"Muskurayega India"	Vishal Mishra	

== Awards and nominations ==
Advani has received two Filmfare Awards nominations - Best Actress for Shershaah (2022) and Satyaprem Ki Katha (2024) and two IIFA Awards nominations - Best Actress in a Leading Role for the same.
