= Ali S. Asani =

Kenyan-American academic

Ali Sultaan Asani (born 1954 in Nairobi, Kenya) is a Kenyan-American academic. He is Murray A. Albertson Professor of Middle Eastern Studies and Professor of Indo-Muslim and Islamic Religion and Cultures at Harvard University. He has served as Director of Prince Alwaleed bin Talal Islamic Studies Program at Harvard University as well as the Chair of the Department of Near Eastern Languages and Civilizations.

== Background ==
Asani was born and brought up in a Pakistani Kenyan family in Kenya. He is of Sindhi descent and belongs to the Ismaili Khoja community.

== Academic career ==
After completing his high-school education in Kenya, he attended Harvard College, graduating in 1977 summa cum laude in the Comparative Study of Religion. He continued his graduate work at Harvard in the Department of Near Eastern Languages and Civilizations (NELC) specializing in Indo-Muslim Culture, and received his Ph.D. in 1984.

He was appointed assistant professor of Indo-Muslim Culture in the Department of Near Eastern Languages and Civilizations and the Department of Sanskrit and Indian Studies, teaching Urdu-Hindi, Sindhi, Gujarati, and Swahili as well as courses on various aspects of the Islamic tradition. He has since been given tenure and appointed Murray A. Albertson Professor of Middle Eastern Studies and Professor of Indo-Muslim and Islamic Religion and Cultures in the Committee on the Study of Religion and the Department of Near Eastern Languages and Civilizations. He directs NELC's doctoral program in Indo-Muslim Culture.

He is the recipient of several awards including the Harvard Foundation Medal for his contributions to improving intercultural and inter-racial relations, the Petra C. Shattuck Prize for teaching, the 2021 Harvard Phi Beta Kappa Award for Excellence in Teaching, and the 2020 Harvard Foundation Faculty of the Year Award for his efforts at making Harvard College a more inclusive institution.
