= Harry Escott =

British composer (born 1976)

- Born: 9 September 1976; Greater London
- Alma mater: Royal College of Music; Somerville College
- Occupation: Composer
- Website: www.harryescott.co.uk

Harry Escott (born 9 September 1976) is a British composer living in London. He has composed the scores to several films, including Shame (2011), Hard Candy (2005), A Mighty Heart (2007), and Ali & Ava (2021), for which he won a British Independent Film Award for best music. He is a frequent collaborator with Michael Winterbottom, (The Face of an Angel, The Road To Guantanamo, The Wedding Guest, & Greed), Paddy Considine (Journeyman), Steve McQueen (Shame & Uprising) and Clio Barnard (The Arbor, The Selfish Giant & Dark River). His score for Dark River included a song co-written with PJ Harvey, "An Acre of Land", released on Cognitive Shift Recordings.

He scored Eran Creevy's action thriller Welcome to the Punch which was executive produced by Ridley Scott and had its cinematic release in 2013. This was the second time he had worked with Creevy, having scored the director's debut feature, Shifty, for which he received a BIFA nomination in 2008.

Escott's recent television credits include BBC One drama series Roadkill, for which he received a BAFTA award and Steve McQueen's Uprising for which he won the Royal Television Society award in 2021.

He studied music at the Royal College of Music and Somerville College, Oxford.

His choral work, "O Viridissima Virga", was written for the choir of St Bride's Church, London.

== Filmography ==
- Hard Candy (2005) (with Molly Nyman)
- What's Your Name 41? (2005)
- Ghosts (2006) (with Molly Nyman)
- Deep Water (2006) (with Molly Nyman)
- Die Österreichische Methode (The Austrian Method) (2006) (with Molly Nyman)
- The Road to Guantanamo (2006) (with Molly Nyman)
- A Mighty Heart (2007) (with Molly Nyman)
- Poppy Shakespeare (2008) (with Molly Nyman)
- Shifty (2009) (with Molly Nyman)
- The Arbor (2009) (with Molly Nyman)
- I Am Slave (2010) (with Molly Nyman)
- The Battle for Barking (2010)
- Axis of Light (2011)
- Shame (2011)
- Welcome to the Punch (2012)
- What Remains (2013)
- The Selfish Giant (2013)
- New Worlds (2014)
- The Face of an Angel (2014)
- River (2015)
- Tout, tout de suite (2016)
- Retablo (2017)
- Dark River (2017)
- Journeyman (2017)
- Damascus Cover (2018)
- The Wedding Guest (2018)
- Deep State
- Wild Bill (2019)
- Greed (2019)
- The English Game (2020)
- Roadkill (2020)
- Uprising (2021)
- Ali & Ava (2021)
- The Thief, His Wife and the Canoe (2022)
- Joan (2024)
