= List of awards and nominations received by Riz Ahmed =

Riz Ahmed awards and nominations
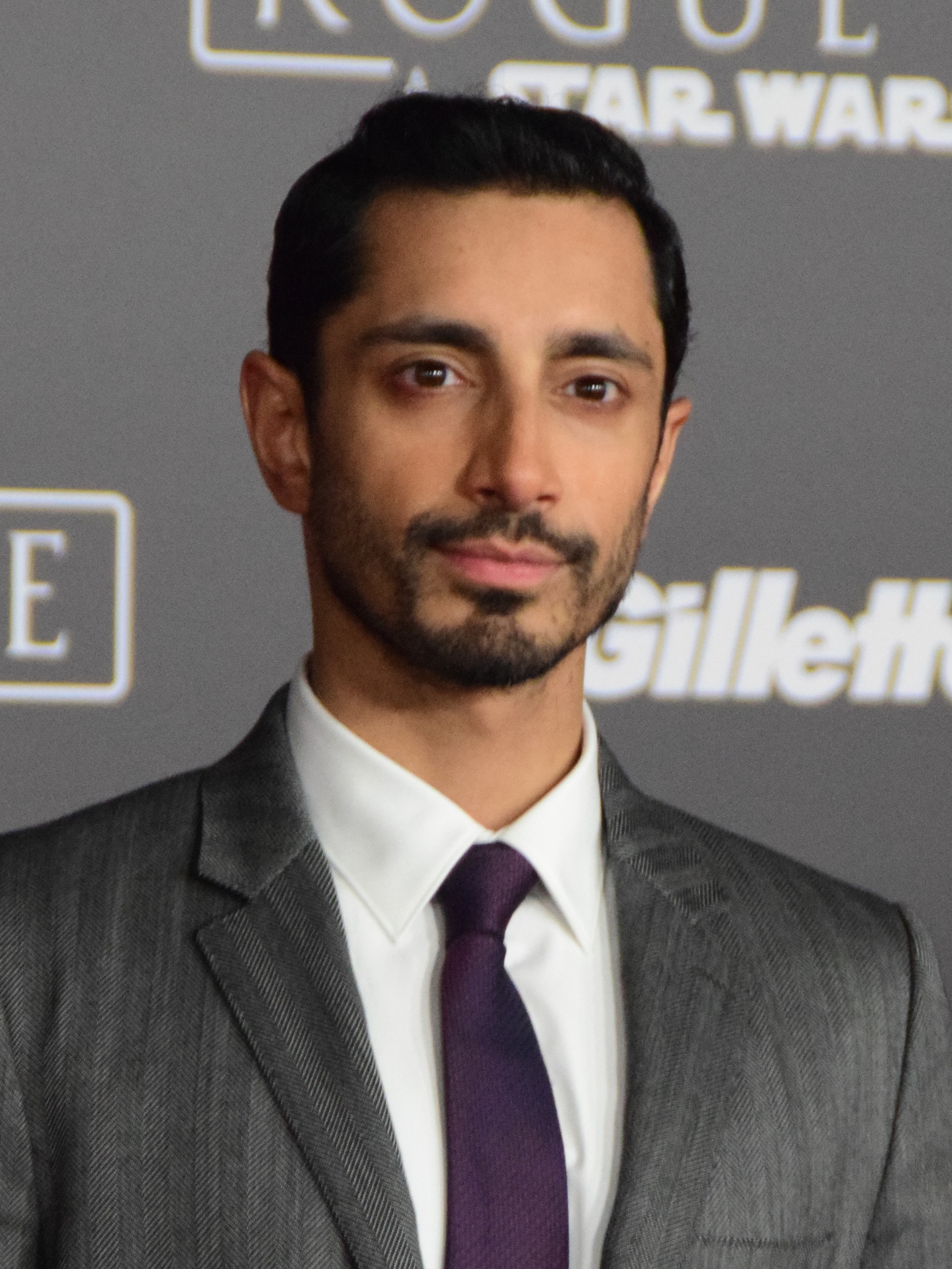
- Ahmed in 2016
Awards and nominations
Award	Wins	Nominations
Academy Awards	1	2
Actor Awards	0	2
BAFTA Awards	0	2
Critics' Choice Awards	0	1
Emmy Awards	1	3
Golden Globe Awards	0	2

Totals (Note: Certain award groups do not simply award one winner. They acknowledge several different recipients, have runners-up, and have third place. Since this is a specific recognition and is different from losing an award, runner-up mentions are considered wins in this award tally. For simplification and to avoid errors, each award in this list has been presumed to have had a prior nomination.)
- Wins: 26
- Nominations: 70

Riz Ahmed is a British actor and rapper. Known for his roles in film and television, he has received an Academy Award and a Primetime Emmy Award as well as nominations for two BAFTA Awards, a Critics' Choice Award, two Golden Globe Awards and two Actor Awards.

He is known for his appearances in films such as Four Lions (2010), The Reluctant Fundamentalist (2012), Closed Circuit (2013), Nightcrawler (2014), Jason Bourne (2016), Rogue One (2016), The Sisters Brothers (2018), Venom (2018), and Mogul Mowgli (2020). Ahmed gained critical acclaim and awards notoriety for his leading role in Darius Marder's drama film Sound of Metal (2020), a film in which Ahmed also served as an executive producer. Ahmed earned Academy Award, Golden Globe Award, British Academy Film Award, and Actor Award nominations for his performance. He received the Independent Spirit Award for Best Male Lead for his performance.

Ahmed also won acclaim for his leading role in the HBO limited series, The Night Of (2017), starring opposite John Turturro. For his performance he received a Primetime Emmy Award for Outstanding Lead Actor in a Limited Series or Movie. He also received Golden Globe Award, and Actor Award nominations for his performance. Ahmed also received a Primetime Emmy Award for Outstanding Guest Actor in a Comedy Series nomination for his role in the HBO comedy series Girls (2017).

== Major associations ==
=== Academy Awards ===
Year	Category	Nominated work	Result	Ref.
2021	Best Actor	Sound of Metal	Nominated	
2022	Best Live Action Short Film	The Long Goodbye	Won	

=== Actor Awards ===
Year	Category	Nominated work	Result	Ref.
2017	Outstanding Actor in a Miniseries or Television Movie	The Night Of	Nominated	
2021	Outstanding Actor in a Leading Role	Sound of Metal	Nominated	

=== BAFTA Awards ===
Year	Category	Nominated work	Result	Ref.
British Academy Film Awards
2021	Outstanding British Film	Mogul Mowgli	Nominated	
2021	Best Actor in a Leading Role	Sound of Metal	Nominated	

=== Critics' Choice Awards ===
Year	Category	Nominated work	Result	Ref.
Critics' Choice Movie Awards
2020	Best Actor	Sound of Metal	Nominated	

=== Emmy Awards ===
Year	Category	Nominated work	Result	Ref.
Primetime Emmy Awards
2017	Outstanding Guest Actor in a Comedy Series	Girls (for "All I Ever Wanted")	Nominated	
2017	Outstanding Lead Actor in a Limited Series or Movie	The Night Of	Won	
2026	Outstanding Lead Actor in a Limited or Anthology Series or Movie	Bait	Nominated	

=== Golden Globe Awards ===
Year	Category	Nominated work	Result	Ref.
2017	Best Actor – Miniseries or Television Film	The Night Of	Nominated	
2021	Best Actor – Motion Picture Drama	Sound of Metal	Nominated	

=== Independent Spirit Awards ===
Year	Category	Nominated work	Result	Ref.
2014	Best Supporting Male	Nightcrawler	Nominated	
2021	Best Male Lead	Sound of Metal	Won	

== Festival awards ==
Year (Note: Year in which awards ceremony was held.)	Organization	Work(s)	Category	Result	Ref.
2012	Berlin International Film Festival	Ill Manors	Shooting Star Award – Actor	Won	
2018	British Urban Film Festival	City of Tiny Lights	Best Actor	Nominated	
2008	Geneva International Film Festival	Shifty	Best Actor	Won	
2021	Miami International Film Festival	Sound of Metal	Impact Award	Won	
2014	Nashville Film Festival	Daytimer	Best Live Action Short	Won	
2021	Palm Springs International Film Festival	Sound of Metal	Desert Palm Achievement Award, Actor	Won	
2021	Provincetown International Film Festival		Excellence in Acting Award	Won	
2021	Santa Barbara International Film Festival	Sound of Metal	Virtuosos Honoree	Won	
2014	Sundance Film Festival	Daytimer	Short Film Grand Jury Prize	Nominated	

== Miscellaneous awards ==
Year (Note: Year in which awards ceremony was held.)	Organization	Work(s)	Category	Result	Ref.
2021	Australian Academy Film Awards	Sound of Metal	Best International Actor	Nominated	
2021	Alliance of Women Film Journalists	Sound of Metal	Best Actor	Nominated	
2008	British Independent Film Awards	Shifty	Best Performance by an Actor in a British Independent Film	Nominated	
2010	British Independent Film Awards	Four Lions	Best Performance by an Actor in a British Independent Film	Nominated	
2012	British Independent Film Awards	Ill Manors	Best Performance by an Actor in a British Independent Film	Nominated	
2020	British Independent Film Awards	The Long Goodbye	Best British Short Film	Won	
2020	British Independent Film Awards	Mogul Mowgli	Best Screenplay	Nominated	
2020	British Independent Film Awards	Mogul Mowgli	Best Debut Screenwriter	Won	
2020	British Independent Film Awards	Mogul Mowgli	Best Performance by an Actor in a British Independent Film	Nominated	
2021	British Independent Film Awards	Encounter	Best Performance by an Actor in a British Independent Film	Nominated	
2017	Dorian Awards	The Night Of	TV Performance of the Year — Actor	Nominated	
2021	Dorian Awards	Sound of Metal	Best Film Performance — Actor	Nominated	
2017	Empire Awards	Rogue One: A Star Wars Story	Best Male Newcomer	Nominated	
2010	Evening Standard British Film Awards	Four Lions	Best Actor	Nominated	
2014	Gotham Awards	Nightcrawler	Breakthrough Actor	Nominated	
2021	Gotham Awards	Sound of Metal	Best Actor	Won	
2020	Greater WNY Film Association	Sound of Metal	Best Lead Actor	Won	
2017	Kids' Choice Awards	Rogue One: A Star Wars Story	#Squad	Nominated	
2017	MTV Movie & TV Awards		Next Generation	Nominated	
2017	MTV Video Music Awards	"Immigrants (We Get the Job Done)"	Best Fight Against the System	Won	

== Critics awards ==
Year (Note: Year in which awards ceremony was held.)	Organization	Work(s)	Category	Result	Ref.
2021	Atlanta Film Critics Circle	Best Lead Actor	Sound of Metal	Won	
2021	Austin Film Critics Association	Best Actor	Sound of Metal	Won	
2020	Boston Society of Film Critics	Best Actor	Sound of Metal	Runner-up	
2020	Chicago Film Critics Association	Best Actor	Sound of Metal	Nominated	
2021	Columbus Film Critics Association	Best Actor	Sound of Metal	Won	
2021	Critics' Choice Movie Awards	Best Actor	Sound of Metal	Nominated	
2021	Dallas–Fort Worth Film Critics Association	Best Actor	Sound of Metal	Runner-up	
2021	Denver Film Critics Society	Best Actor	Sound of Metal	Nominated	
2021	Detroit Film Critics Society	Best Actor	Sound of Metal	Nominated	
2020	Florida Film Critics Circle	Best Actor	Sound of Metal	Nominated	
2014	Georgia Film Critics Association	Best Supporting Actor	Nightcrawler	Nominated	
2021	Georgia Film Critics Association	Best Actor	Sound of Metal	Won	
2021	Hollywood Critics Association	Best Actor	Sound of Metal	Nominated	
2021	Houston Film Critics Society	Best Actor	Sound of Metal	Won	
2020	Indiana Film Journalists Association	Best Actor	Sound of Metal	Nominated	
2014	IndieWire Critics Poll	Best Supporting Actor	Nightcrawler	8th Place	
2020	IndieWire Critics Poll	Best Performance	Sound of Metal	Won	
2021	Kansas City Film Critics Circle	Best Actor	Sound of Metal	Won	
2021	Latino Entertainment Journalists Association	Best Actor	Sound of Metal	Nominated	
2010	London Film Critics' Circle	British Actor of the Year	Four Lions	Nominated	
2014	London Film Critics' Circle	Supporting Actor of the Year	Nightcrawler	Nominated	
2021	London Film Critics' Circle	Actor of the Year	Sound of Metal	Nominated	
2021	London Film Critics' Circle	British Actor of the Year	Sound of Metal, Mogul Mowgli	Won	
2020	Los Angeles Film Critics Association	Best Actor	Sound of Metal	Runner-up	
2021	National Board of Review	Best Actor	Sound of Metal	Won	
2021	National Society of Film Critics	Best Actor	Sound of Metal	Runner-up	
2021	New York Film Critics Online	Best Actor	Sound of Metal	Won	
2021	North Carolina Film Critics Association	Best Actor	Sound of Metal	Nominated	
2021	North Dakota Film Critics Society	Best Actor	Sound of Metal	Won	
2021	Online Film Critics Society	Best Actor	Sound of Metal	Nominated	
2014	Online Film & Television Association	Best Breakthrough Performance – Male	Nightcrawler	Nominated	
2014	Online Film & Television Association	Best Supporting Actor	Nightcrawler	Nominated	
2017	Online Film & Television Association	Best Actor in a Motion Picture or Limited Series	The Night Of	Won	
2017	Online Film & Television Association	Best Guest Actor in a Comedy Series	Girls	Won	
2021	Online Film & Television Association	Best Actor	Sound of Metal	Nominated	
2014	San Diego Film Critics Society	Best Supporting Actor	Nightcrawler	Nominated	
2021	San Diego Film Critics Society	Best Actor	Sound of Metal	Won	
2021	San Francisco Bay Area Film Critics Circle	Best Actor	Sound of Metal	Nominated	
2021	Satellite Awards	Best Actor in a Motion Picture – Drama	Sound of Metal	Won	
2021	Seattle Film Critics Society	Best Actor	Sound of Metal	Won	
2021	St. Louis Film Critics Association	Best Actor	Sound of Metal	Nominated	
2020	Sunset Film Circle	Best Actor	Sound of Metal	Won	
2021	Toronto Film Critics Association	Best Actor	Sound of Metal	Won	
2006	UK Asian Music Awards	Best MC	"Post 9/11 Blues"	Won	
2014	Village Voice Film Poll	Best Supporting Actor	Nightcrawler	Nominated	
2021	Washington D.C. Area Film Critics Association	Best Actor	Sound of Metal	Nominated	
