= Welcome to the Punch =

2013 British action thriller film

- UK cinema poster
- Directed by: Eran Creevy
- Written by: Eran Creevy
- Produced by: Rory Aitken; Ben Pugh; Brian Kavanaugh-Jones
- Starring: James McAvoy; Mark Strong; Andrea Riseborough
- Cinematography: Ed Wild
- Edited by: Chris Gill
- Music by: Harry Escott
- Production companies: Worldview Entertainment; Scott Free Productions; Between The Eyes; Automatik; British Film Institute; IM Global; Alliance Films
- Distributed by: Momentum Pictures
- Release dates: 24 February 2013 (Glasgow Film Festival); 15 March 2013
- Running time: 99 minutes
- Country: United Kingdom
- Language: English
- Budget: $8.5 million
- Box office: $3.9 million

Welcome to the Punch is a 2013 British action crime thriller film written and directed by Eran Creevy and starring James McAvoy, Mark Strong, and Andrea Riseborough. The script had been placed on the 2010 Brit List, a film-industry-compiled list of the best unproduced screenplays in British film. With seven votes, the film was placed third.

== Plot ==
Four gunmen emerge from a building in gas masks after a robbery and leave on motorbikes. DI Max Lewinsky sets off in pursuit of the gang in his car. He fails to catch them and suffers an injury after being shot in the leg by Jacob Sternwood, who could have easily killed him.

Three years later, Lewinsky suffers from his wound and has to use drugs for the pain. He works with DS Sarah Hawks, with whom he is on good terms. While escorting the prisoner Dean Warns, an ex-soldier suspected of smuggling weapons, they are met by ambitious Commander Thomas Geiger and DCI Nathan Bartnick who inform them that Warns is to be released due to lack of evidence. A security guard said he saw Warns in a container yard in connection with the offence but has retracted his statement.

Lewinsky learns that Sternwood's son, Ruan, has collapsed on an aircraft runway while travelling under an alias and has been hospitalized. Ruan called an Icelandic landline number before he collapsed, leading a police taskforce to journey to Iceland to find Sternwood. Lewinsky has no faith in this idea, but the police ignore his doubts. They surround Sternwood's property, but he escapes and detonates a booby trap bomb that kills several policemen. Lewinsky suggests that Ruan's location be made public to draw Jacob out of hiding and offers to stay in the hospital with Sarah to await Jacob's appearance. Jacob goes to the hospital to confirm his son's situation and leaves without being caught. Ruan dies shortly afterwards, but this is not revealed on the off-chance that Sternwood will return. Lewinsky tracks down the security guard who retracted his statement, thinking that Sternwood may have forced him to do so, but the guard refuses to help. Sarah follows Warns to the container yard to look for evidence, but Warns intercepts and kills her.

Bartnick is contacted by Sternwood. Bartnick arranges to meet Sternwood at a club to tell him who shot Ruan. Geiger, having tapped the phone call, informs Lewinsky about the meeting. Lewinsky finds Bartnick and Warns are already there, working together. Bartnick and Warns open fire on Lewinsky and Sternwood. Bartnick is fatally shot by Sternwood. Sternwood protects Lewinsky, but, after the gunfight, Lewinsky attacks Sternwood. Sternwood overpowers him and demands to be taken to see his son. Lewinsky complies without revealing that Ruan is dead. At the hospital mortuary, Sternwood is heartbroken and incensed by his son's death. Whilst at the hospital mortuary, Lewinsky discovers that Sarah is dead when he comes across her body on a stretcher.

Sternwood and Lewinsky confront Warns at his house. They tell Warns they know about his collaboration with Geiger and the details of the gunrunning. After a shootout, Warns is taken prisoner and forced to contact Geiger to arrange a meeting at "The Punch", a section of the container yard. Lewinsky and Sternwood force Warns to go with them to the meeting. When Geiger arrives, they ambush him. Lewinsky blames Geiger for Sarah's death and accuses him of complicity in the arms deal among other criminal dealings. Geiger admits "turning a blind eye" on many occasions and implicates a high ranking minister, Kincade. Suddenly armed military contractors from Kincade open fire. Lewinsky kills Warns, and Sternwood kills Geiger. Lewinsky and Sternwood face each other. Lewinsky raises his gun, but recalling the earlier time when Sternwood deliberately did not kill him, allows him to flee. As Sternwood escapes, Lewinsky presents himself to the arriving police.

== Cast ==
- James McAvoy as DI Max Lewinsky
- Mark Strong as Jacob Sternwood
- Andrea Riseborough as DS Sarah Hawks
- Elyes Gabel as Ruan Sternwood
- Peter Mullan as Roy Edwards
- David Morrissey as Lieutenant Commander Thomas Geiger
- Daniel Kaluuya as Juka Ogadowa
- Daniel Mays as DCI Nathan Bartnick
- Johnny Harris as Dean Warns
- Dannielle Brent as Karen Edwards
- Jason Flemyng as Harvey Crown
- Ruth Sheen as Nan

== Production ==
The film was produced by Ben Pugh and Rory Aitken of Between the Eyes, who also produced Eran Creevy's debut feature Shifty. Brian Kavanaugh-Jones also served as a producer on the movie with Worldview Entertainment. Ridley Scott and Liza Marshall of Scott Free executive produced the film. Shooting took place mostly in London, starting 28 July. Some of the interior and exterior scenes were filmed at London College of Communication in Elephant and Castle in August 2011. City of Westminster College's Paddington Green Campus was used for the press conference scene.

== Release ==
Welcome To The Punch premiered at the Glasgow Film Festival. It debuted in third place in the United Kingdom on 15 March 2013, where it grossed £460,000 across 370 cinemas in its opening weekend. In 2012, IFC Films bought distribution rights for the United States and it opened on 27 March 2013, where it grossed $9,747. It was released on home video in the U.K. in July 2013.

== Reception ==
On review aggregator Rotten Tomatoes, the film holds a 48% approval rating based on 56 reviews, with an average rating of 5.6/10. The website's critics consensus reads: "Welcome to the Punch is a little deeper and more thoughtful than most police dramas -- but not quite enough to surmount its thinly written characters and numbing violence." On Metacritic, the film has a weighted average score of 49 out of 100, based on 16 critics, indicating "mixed or average reviews".

Peter Bradshaw of The Guardian called it an ambitious but predictable film that "runs out of steam" by the end. Emma Dibdin of Total Film wrote, "There's an emotional vacuum at its centre but Welcome To The Punch is an adrenalin shot to the heart of the Brit-crime genre." Dan Jolin of Empire called it "a confident, ambitious and action-rich Brit thriller, albeit one whose characters and clarity suffer from the frantic intensity of its pacing." Guy Lodge of Variety described it as "a proficient but personality-free policer that demands little of either its audience or its enviable best-of-British cast". Frank Scheck of The Hollywood Reporter wrote that "despite its fast pacing and well-staged action set-pieces, the film fails to make much of an impression." Robert Abele of the Los Angeles Times called it "derivative, dumb fun". Manohla Dargis of The New York Times wrote that it is an "enjoyable absurdity" that is unintentionally funny yet still recommended.
