= Daniel Mays =

British actor (born 1978)

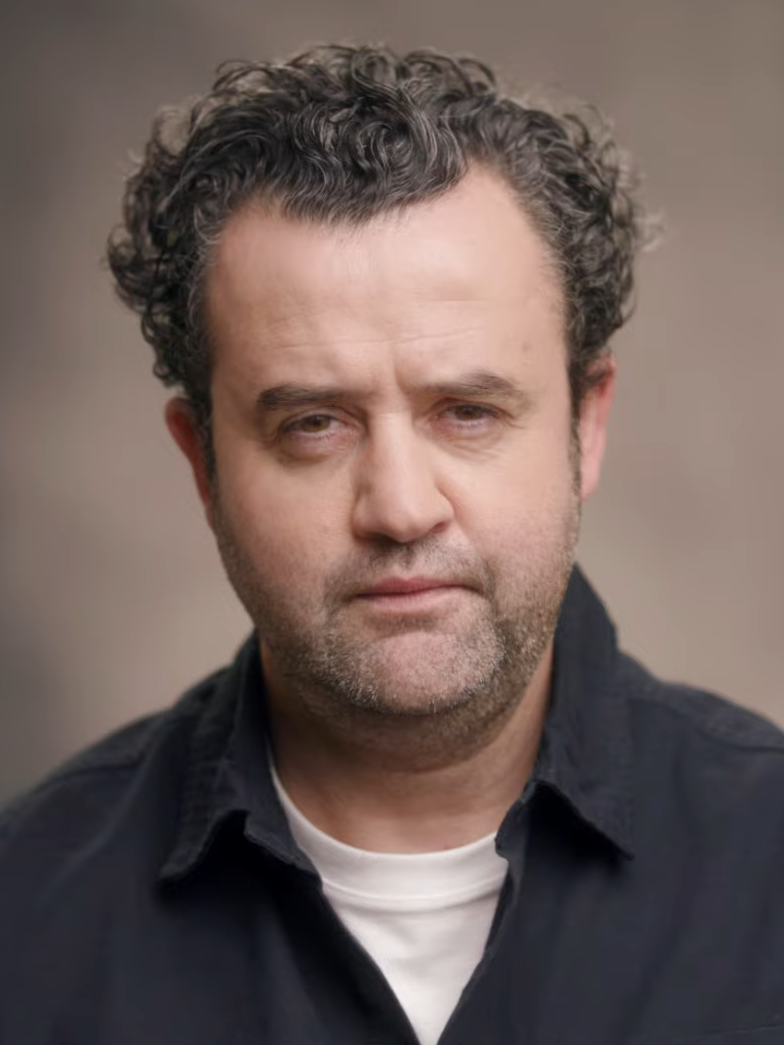
- Mays at Soccer Aid for Unicef 2025
- Born: 31 March 1978 (age 48); Epping, Essex, England
- Education: Italia Conti Academy of Theatre Arts and Royal Academy of Dramatic Art
- Occupation: Actor
- Years active: 1995–present
- Spouse: Louise Burton
- Children: 2
- Website: danielmays.co.uk

Daniel Mays (born 31 March 1978) is an English actor who has had television roles in EastEnders (2000), Rehab (2005), Red Riding (2008), Ashes to Ashes (2010), Outcasts (2011), Mrs Biggs, Line of Duty, Des and White Lines (2020), and film roles in Pearl Harbor (2001), All or Nothing (2002), Vera Drake (2004), Shifty, Made in Dagenham, Byzantium (2012), Rogue One: A Star Wars Story (2016) and The Thursday Murder Club (2025).

Mays has been nominated as Best Supporting Actor for the BIFA and the BAFTA TV, as well as having extensive experience in theatre. In 2024, he was nominated for the Laurence Olivier Award for Best Actor in a Musical for his performance in Guys and Dolls at the Bridge Theatre.

== Early life and education ==
Born in Epping, Essex, the third of four boys, Mays was brought up in Buckhurst Hill, Essex, by his electrician father and bank cashier mother. He attended the Italia Conti Academy of Theatre Arts, before going on to become a student at the Royal Academy of Dramatic Art (RADA), graduating in 2000 with an Acting Diploma.

== Career ==
In 2000, Mays' debut role was a slot in EastEnders. Mays started his big screen career in 2001, as a pilot in the film Pearl Harbor. His big break happened in 2002, when Mike Leigh cast him in both All or Nothing and Vera Drake, and Mays has said that working with Leigh was a big influence, advising that no stone be unturned when creating truly believable characters.

In 2005, he was cast in the BBC drama Rehab, then in 2008, played the role of Michael Myshkin in Channel 4's adaptation of David Peace's Red Riding trilogy. His appearance in the 2008 independent British crime film Shifty, co-starring Riz Ahmed, earned him a nomination for best supporting actor at the British Independent Film Awards.

In 2010, Mays starred as Eddie O'Grady in the film Made in Dagenham. In the same year, he played DCI Jim Keats in the third series of Ashes to Ashes, in which he portrayed a character that was the antagonist of Philip Glenister's Gene Hunt.

In 2011, Mays appeared in the BBC sci-fi series Outcasts. He had roles in No One Gets Off in This Town and a supporting role in the Steven Spielberg film The Adventures of Tintin: The Secret of the Unicorn. He then played a criminal on a curfew after serving a 10-year sentence for the murder of his girlfriend when he was 19 in the programme Public Enemies, which aired on BBC One in early January 2012. He played Ronnie Biggs in a 5-part drama called Mrs Biggs. In 2012, he starred alongside Gemma Arterton and Saoirse Ronan in the vampire film Byzantium.

For much of the latter half of 2013, Mays performed on stage. Performing in Nick Payne's Same Deep Water As Me at the Donmar Warehouse alongside Nigel Lindsay and in the first major revival of Jez Butterworth's debut play Mojo at the Harold Pinter Theatre. He starred alongside Ben Whishaw, Brendan Coyle, Rupert Grint and Colin Morgan.

In 2016, Mays starred in series 3 of BBC drama Line of Duty as Sergeant Danny Waldron, an armed response officer whose troubled and abusive childhood comes under investigation as part of wider investigation of police corruption throughout the serial. He was nominated for a BAFTA Television Award for Supporting Actor for his role. In 2016, Mays played the part of Aston in Harold Pinter's play The Caretaker directed by Matthew Warchus at The Old Vic Theatre in London opposite Timothy Spall and George MacKay. The same year, Mays portrayed Tivik in the film Rogue One: A Star Wars Story.

In 2020, Mays starred as lead investigator Detective Chief Inspector Peter Jay in the ITV three-part television drama miniseries Des, about the 1983 arrest of the serial killer Dennis Nilsen, and as Marcus in the Ibiza based whodunnit series White Lines.

In March 2023, Mays made his musical debut as Nathan Detroit in Guys and Dolls directed by Nicholas Hytner at the Bridge Theatre. He left the production temporarily in July (where the role was taken over by Owain Arthur) due to filming commitments before returning to it in October. For his performance, Mays was nominated for the Laurence Olivier Award for Best Actor in a Musical in 2024.

== Personal life ==
Mays has a son and a daughter with makeup artist Louise Burton. As of 2005, he was living in Crouch End, an area in the London Borough of Haringey. A keen football fan, he is a supporter of Leyton Orient.

== Filmography ==
Key
| † | Denotes films that have not yet been released |

=== Film ===
| Year | Title | Role | Notes |
|---|---|---|---|
| 2001 | Pearl Harbor | Pilot #3 | |
| 2001 | Skin Deep | Flashback Youth | Short film |
| 2002 | All or Nothing | Jason | |
| 2004 | Vera Drake | Sid | |
| 2005 | The Secret Life of Words | Martin | |
| 2005 | The Best Man | Pool Guy | |
| 2006 | Middletown | Jim Hunter | |
| 2006 | A Good Year | Bert the Doorman | |
| 2007 | Atonement | Tommy Nettle | |
| 2008 | The Bank Job | Dave Shilling | |
| 2008 | Shifty | Chris | |
| 2008 | Bitter | Tony | Short film |
| 2009 | Mr. Nobody | Young Journalist | |
| 2009 | The Firm | Yeti | |
| 2010 | Nanny McPhee and the Big Bang | Blenkinsop | |
| 2010 | Hippie Hippie Shake | David Widgery | Unreleased film |
| 2010 | Made in Dagenham | Eddie O'Grady | |
| 2010 | No One Gets Off in This Town | (unknown) | |
| 2011 | The Adventures of Tintin: The Secret of the Unicorn | Allan / Pirate Flunky #1 (voice) | |
| 2012 | Byzantium | Noel | |
| 2013 | Welcome to the Punch | Nathan Bartnick | |
| 2015 | Victor Frankenstein | Barnaby | |
| 2016 | Rags | Gerry | Short film |
| 2016 | Dad's Army | Private Joe Walker | |
| 2016 | The Infiltrator | Frankie | |
| 2016 | Rogue One | Tivik | Cameo |
| 2017 | The Limehouse Golem | George Flood | |
| 2018 | Swimming with Men | Colin | |
| 2018 | Two for Joy | Lias | |
| 2018 | Furies | The Furies | Short film |
| 2018 | Shaun | William | |
| 2019 | Fisherman's Friends | Danny Anderson | |
| 2019 | 1917 | Sergeant Sanders | |
| 2020 | The Rhythm Section | Dean West | Uncredited role |
| 2022 | Your Christmas or Mine? | Geoff Taylor | |
| 2023 | Chicken Run: Dawn of the Nugget | Fetcher (voice) | Replacing Phil Daniels |
| 2023 | Your Christmas or Mine 2 | Geoff Taylor | |
| 2024 | The Awakening | Mike | Short film |
| 2025 | The Thursday Murder Club | DCI Chris Hudson | |
| 2026 | Shelter | Arthur Booth | |
| TBA | The Scurry † | Grant | Completed |

=== Television ===
| Year | Title | Role | Notes |
|---|---|---|---|
| 1996 | Fist of Fun | Patrick Nuffy | 3 episodes (series 2) |
| 1996 | Grange Hill | Adrian / Dancer | 5 episodes |
| 2000 | EastEnders | Kevin | 4 episodes |
| 2001 | In Deep | Dave Street | 2 episodes: "Ghost Squad: Parts 1 & 2" |
| 2001 | The Bill | Warren Debdale | Episode: "Temptation" |
| 2002 | Manchild | Mechanic | Episode: "Fiftysomething" |
| 2002 | NCS: Manhunt | Danny Bird | 5 episodes |
| 2002 | Dead Casual | (unknown) | TV film |
| 2002 | Bodily Harm | Second Trader | Mini-series; episode 1 |
| 2002 | Tipping the Velvet | Jimmy Burns | Mini-series; 2 episodes |
| 2003 | Rehab | Adam | TV film |
| 2004 | Keen Eddie | Ronnie Wiggensey Jr. | Episode: "Sticky Fingers" |
| 2004 | Top Buzzer | Carlton | Main cast. 10 episodes |
| 2005 | Beneath the Skin | Moz Burnside | TV film |
| 2005 | Class of '76 | DS Steven Grant | TV film |
| 2005 | Funland | Carter Krantz | Main cast. Mini-series; 11 episodes |
| 2006 | Great News | Steve Benfield | Unknown episodes |
| 2007 | Consent | Steve | TV film |
| 2007 | Saddam's Tribe: Bound by Blood | Uday Hussein | TV film |
| 2007 | Half Broken Things | Michael | TV film |
| 2008 | White Girl | Steve | TV film |
| 2008 | Consuming Passion: 100 Years of Mills & Boon | Charles Boon | TV film |
| 2009 | Plus One | Rob Black | Main role. 5 episodes |
| 2009 | Red Riding: The Year of Our Lord 1974 | Michael Myshkin | TV film. Part 1 of the trilogy |
| 2009 | Red Riding: The Year of Our Lord 1983 | Michael Myshkin | TV film. Part 3 of the trilogy |
| 2009 | The Street | Mark | Episode: "Meet the Parents" |
| 2010 | Hustle | Mervyn Lloyd | Episode: "Conned Out of Luck" |
| 2010 | Ashes to Ashes | DCI Jim Keats | Main cast. 8 episodes (series 3) |
| 2011 | Outcasts | Cass Cromwell | Main cast. 8 episodes |
| 2011 | Doctor Who | Alex | Episode: "Night Terrors" |
| 2012 | Treasure Island | Dr. Livesey | Mini-series; 2 episodes |
| 2012 | Public Enemies | Eddie Mottram | Main cast. Mini-series; 3 episodes |
| 2012 | Mrs Biggs | Ronnie Biggs | Main cast. Mini-series; 5 episodes |
| 2014 | Playhouse Presents | Guv | Episode: "Nightshift" |
| 2014 | Common | Tommy Ward | TV film |
| 2014 | The Great War: The People's Story | Reg Evans | Mini-series; 2 episodes |
| 2014 | The Great Fire | Samuel Pepys | Mini-series; 4 episodes |
| 2014 | Knifeman | Julian Tattersal | TV film |
| 2016 | Line of Duty | PS Danny Waldron | 3 episodes (series 3) |
| 2017 | Against the Law | Peter Wildeblood | TV film. Docu-drama |
| 2017 | Born to Kill | Bill | Main cast. Mini-series; 4 episodes |
| 2017 | Guerrilla | Cullen | Main cast. Mini-series; 6 episodes |
| 2018 | Urban Myths | Mike Housego | Episode: "The Sex Pistols Vs. Bill Grundy" |
| 2018 | Mother's Day | Colin | TV film |
| 2018 | My Dinner with Hervé | Casey | TV film |
| 2018 | The Interrogation of Tony Martin | DC Peters | TV film |
| 2019 | Do Not Disturb | (unknown) | Episode: "Silent Treatment" |
| 2019 | Porters | Anthony De La Mer | Main cast. 6 episodes (series 2) |
| 2019 | Good Omens | Arthur Young | Recurring cast. 6 episodes (series 1) |
| 2019, 2021 | Temple | Lee Simmons | 14 episodes (series 1 & 2) |
| 2020 | White Lines | Marcus | Main cast. 10 episodes |
| 2020 | The Kemps: All True | Himself | TV film |
| 2020 | Des | DCI Peter Jay | Main cast. Mini-series; 3 episodes |
| 2020–2022 | Code 404 | DI John Major | Main role. 18 episodes (series 1–3) |
| 2022 | Magpie Murders | Locke / Chubb | Main cast. 5 episodes |
| 2022 | Inside No. 9 | Shane | Episode: "Kid/Nap" |
| 2022 | Maryland | PC Moody | TV film |
| 2023 | Still Up | Rich | Episode: "Veggie Veggie Bing Bong" |
| 2023 | The Long Shadow | Sydney Jackson | Mini-series; 3 episodes |
| 2024 | Franklin | Edward Bancroft | Main cast. Mini-series; 8 episodes |
| 2024 | Moonflower Murders | Chubb / Locke | Main cast. Mini-series; 6 episodes |
| 2024–2026 | A Thousand Blows | William 'Punch' Lewis | Main cast. 8 episodes (series 1 & 2) |
| 2025 | Suspect: The Shooting of Jean Charles de Menezes | Cliff Todd | 2 episodes: "The Terror" & "The Hunt" |
| 2025 | Bookish | Eric Wellbeloved | 2 episodes: "Slightly Foxed: Parts 1 & 2" |
| 2025 | Lynley | DCI Brian Nies | 4 episodes |
| 2026 | Lord of the Flies | Fred | Mini-series; episode 4: "Ralph" |
| 2026 | Believe Me | John Worboys | 4 episodes |
| TBA | Berlin Noir † | Hari Voss | Post-production |

=== Video games ===
| Year | Title | Role (voice) | Notes |
|---|---|---|---|
| 2025 | Chicken Run: Eggstraction | Fetcher | |

== Awards and nominations ==
| Year | Award | Category | Work | Result | Ref. |
|---|---|---|---|---|---|
| 2004 | Reims International Television Days | Best Actor | Rehab | Won | |
| 2008 | British Independent Film Awards | BIFA TV Award for Best Supporting Actor | Shifty | Nominated | |
| 2013 | National Television Awards | Most Popular Male Drama Performance | Mrs Biggs | Nominated | |
| 2017 | British Academy Television Awards | BAFTA TV Award for Best Supporting Actor | Line of Duty | Nominated | |
| 2024 | Laurence Olivier Award | Best Actor in a Musical | Guys and Dolls | Nominated | |

== See also ==
- List of British actors
