= Microscope (album) =

Studio album by Riz MC
- Released: 31 January 2011
- Genre: Hip hop
- Length: 35:49
- Label: Confirm/Ignore
- Producer: Lazersonic; Redinho

Riz MC chronology
Microscope (2011)	The Long Goodbye (2020)

Singles from Microscope
- 1. "Radar" Released: 2008

Microscope (stylized as MICroscope) is the debut studio album by Riz Ahmed, released under the moniker Riz MC. It was originally released on 31 January 2011. It was re-released on Tru Thoughts on 18 June 2012.

== Critical reception ==
Professional ratings
Aggregate scores
Source	Rating
Metacritic	74/100
Review scores
Source	Rating
BBC	favorable
Cokemachineglow	83%
The Independent	favorable
The Observer	3/5 stars
NME	6/10
PopMatters	7/10 stars

At Metacritic, which assigns a weighted average score out of 100 to reviews from mainstream critics, the album received an average score of 74, based on 6 reviews, indicating "generally favorable reviews".

Josh Langhoff of PopMatters wrote, "The beats by Lazersonic and Redinho churn and pop, squeal and squirm, and Riz tries to take the edge off by cracking jokes." Adam Kennedy of BBC commented that "while his flow isn't the most natural on the block, the warts'n'all streams of consciousness refuse to exclude anything on his mind."

== Track listing ==
2011 original edition
No.	Title	Length
1.	"Radar"	3:14
2.	"People Like People"	3:18
3.	"Don't Sleep"	3:52
4.	"Get on It"	3:34
5.	"All in the Ghetto"	4:09
6.	"Dark Hearts"	3:26
7.	"Bubble Wrapped"	3:43
8.	"All of You"	3:46
9.	"Hundreds & Thousands"	2:33
10.	"Sour Times"	4:14
Total length:		35:49

2012 reissue edition
No.	Title	Length
1.	"Sonic Warfare" (skit 1)	1:23
2.	"Radar"	3:13
3.	"People Like People"	3:17
4.	"Don't Sleep"	3:52
5.	"Sonic Virus" (skit 2)	0:54
6.	"Get on It"	3:34
7.	"All in the Ghetto"	4:10
8.	"Dark Hearts"	3:26
9.	"Sonic Vaccine" (skit 3)	1:12
10.	"Bubble Wrapped"	3:43
11.	"All of You"	3:46
12.	"The Resistance" (skit 4)	0:32
13.	"Hundreds & Thousands"	2:36
14.	"Sour Times"	4:19
15.	"Get on It" (True Tiger remix)	4:43
16.	"All of You" (Rack 'n' Ruin remix)	4:07
17.	"Radar" (Sukh Knight remix)	4:41
18.	"Hundreds & Thousands" (Zed Bias remix)	4:52
19.	"All of You" (dBridge's sound system mix)	5:20
20.	"Hundred & Thousands" (Baobinga jit step remix)	3:37
21.	"Dark Hearts" (30k 30k remix)	5:07
22.	"All of You" (featuring Aruba and Plan B)	3:45
Total length:		76:09
