= Swet Shop Boys =

Hip-hop group

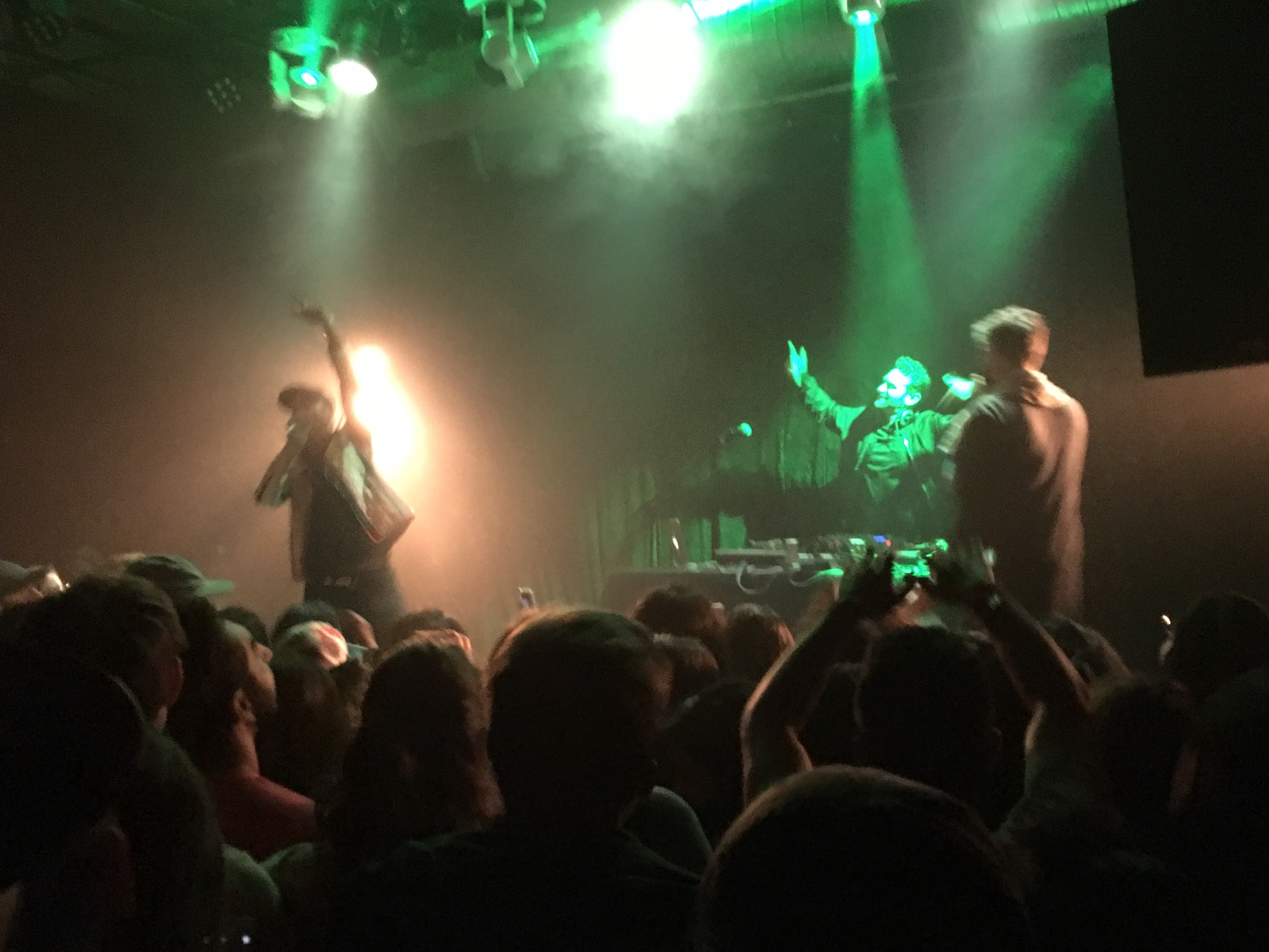
- Swet Shop Boys performing live in 2016.

Background information
- Genre: Hip-hop
- Years active: 2014–present
- Labels: Greedhead; Customs
- Members: Heems; Riz MC; Redinho
- Website: www.swetshopboys.com

Swet Shop Boys is a hip-hop group, consisting of rappers Heems and Riz MC, with producer Redinho.

== History ==
Originally formed by Heems and Riz MC, Swet Shop Boys released an EP, Swet Shop, in 2014. Along with Redinho, the group released the debut album, Cashmere, in 2016. In 2017, the group released an EP, Sufi La.

== Discography ==
Albums

- Cashmere (2016), Customs

EPs

- Swet Shop (2014), Greedhead Music
- Sufi La (2017), Customs
