= The Long Goodbye (Riz Ahmed album) =

Studio album by Riz Ahmed
- Released: 6 March 2020
- Genre: Hip hop
- Length: 26:58
- Label: Mongrel
- Producer: Redinho

Riz Ahmed chronology
| Microscope (2011) | The Long Goodbye (2020) |

Singles from The Long Goodbye
- 1. "Mogambo" Released: 3 October 2018

The Long Goodbye is the second studio album by Riz Ahmed. It was released on his own record label Mongrel Records on 6 March 2020. It is a concept album and was produced by Redinho. It features guest appearances from Ahmed's mother, as well as Mindy Kaling, Mahershala Ali, Yara Shahidi, Asim Chaudhry, Hasan Minhaj, and Jay Sean. It was accompanied by a short film of the same name directed by Aneil Karia, which won Best Live Action Short Film at the 94th Academy Awards. "Mogambo" was released as a single in 2018.

== Concept ==
The Long Goodbye is a concept album about the United Kingdom's historical and contemporary relationship with South Asians and British Asians, framed through the extended metaphor of an abusive romantic relationship in the wake of Brexit and the rise of the far-right in Britain.

== Critical reception ==
Professional ratings
Aggregate scores
| Source | Rating |
|---|---|
| AnyDecentMusic? | 7.8/10 |
| Metacritic | 83/100 |
Review scores
| Source | Rating |
| Clash | 9/10 |
| The Daily Telegraph | 4/5 stars |
| Evening Standard | 4/5 stars |
| The Guardian | 4/5 stars |
| Loud and Quiet | 8/10 |
| MusicOMH | 4/5 stars |
| NME | 4/5 stars |
| The Observer | 4/5 stars |
| Pitchfork | 7.4/10 |

At Metacritic, which assigns a weighted average score out of 100 to reviews from mainstream critics, the album received an average score of 83, based on 7 reviews, indicating "universal acclaim".

Jake Hawkes of Clash described the album as "a tightly packed, lightning-quick swing at the racism of British society." Alexis Petridis of The Guardian wrote, "UK hip-hop and albums bemoaning the current state of things are two crowded markets: The Long Goodbye is potent, original and timely enough to stand out in both." Dhruva Balram of NME commented that "the album is largely a vital statement from a talented, multi-hyphenate artist."

At the 94th Academy Awards, the film based on the album won the Academy Award for Best Live Action Short Film.

== Track listing ==
The Long Goodbye track listing
| No. | Title | Length |
|---|---|---|
| 1. | "The Breakup (Shikwa)" | 3:30 |
| 2. | "Toba Tek Singh" | 3:03 |
| 3. | "Mindy: Take Half" | 0:16 |
| 4. | "Fast Lava" | 1:57 |
| 5. | "Ammi: Come Home" | 0:25 |
| 6. | "Any Day" (featuring Jay Sean) | 2:47 |
| 7. | "Mahershala: Don't Do Anything Stupid" | 0:29 |
| 8. | "Can I Live" | 2:48 |
| 9. | "Yara: Look Inside" | 0:24 |
| 10. | "Where You From" | 2:04 |
| 11. | "Mogambo" | 2:20 |
| 12. | "Chabuddy: Go Southall" | 0:20 |
| 13. | "Deal with It" | 2:31 |
| 14. | "Hasan: Rush Hour 2" | 0:54 |
| 15. | "Karma" | 3:09 |
| Total length: | | 26:58 |

== Charts ==
Sales chart performance for The Long Goodbye
| Chart (2020) | Peak position |
|---|---|
| UK R&B Albums (OCC) | 24 |
