= I Am Slave =

2010 British television film

- Written by: Jeremy Brock
- Directed by: Gabriel Range
- Starring: Wunmi Mosaku; Isaach De Bankolé; Lubna Azabal; Yigal Naor
- Theme music composer: Harry Escott; Molly Nyman
- Country of origin: United Kingdom
- Original language: English

Production
- Producer: Andrea Calderwood
- Cinematography: Robbie Ryan
- Running time: 82 minutes

Original release
- Network: Channel 4
- Release: 30 August 2010

I Am Slave is a 2010 television film produced for British Channel 4 on the story of one woman's fight for freedom from modern-day slavery.

It premiered on Channel 4 on 30 August 2010. The movie is mostly based on the experiences of Mende Nazer, a Sudanese author, human rights activist, and former slave in Sudan and London.

== Selected cast ==
- Wunmi Mosaku - Malia
- Isaach De Bankolé - Bah
- Lubna Azabal - Halima
- Yigal Naor - Said
- Hiam Abbass -
- Nonso Anozie -
- Nyokabi Gethaiga - Hana
- Nasser Memarzia - Ibrahim
- Selva Rasalingam - Amir
- Amaar Sardharwalla - Assi
- Jameel Sardharwalla - Rami

== See also ==
- List of films featuring slavery
