= British Independent Film Awards 2008 =

British Film Award held in 2008

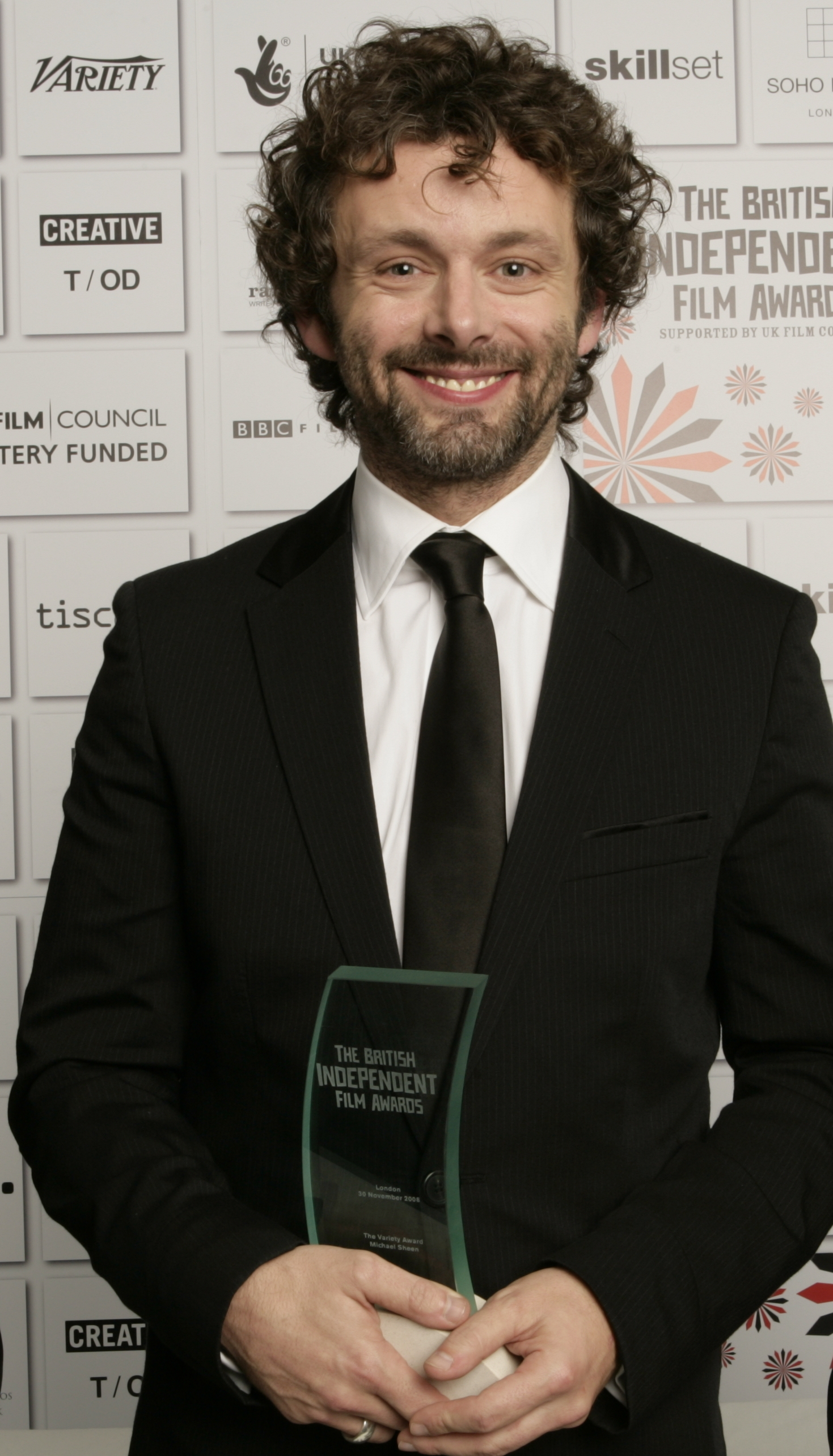
Actor Michael Sheen with his Variety Award at BIFA 2008

The 11th British Independent Film Awards, held on 30 November 2008 at the Old Billingsgate Market in London, honoured the best British independent films of 2008.

== Awards ==
The winner is bolded at the top of each section.

=== Best British Independent Film ===
- **Slumdog Millionaire**
- Hunger
- In Bruges
- Man on Wire
- Somers Town

=== Best Director ===
- **Danny Boyle** for **Slumdog Millionaire**
- Steve McQueen for Hunger
- Shane Meadows for Somers Town
- Garth Jennings for Son of Rambow
- Mark Herman for The Boy in the Striped Pajamas

=== The Douglas Hickox Award ===
Given to a British director on their debut feature

- **Steve McQueen** for **Hunger**
- James Watkins for Eden Lake
- Martin McDonagh for In Bruges
- Eran Creevy for Shifty
- Rupert Wyatt for The Escapist

=== Best Actor ===
- **Michael Fassbender** for **Hunger**
- Brendan Gleeson for In Bruges
- Colin Farrell for In Bruges
- Riz Ahmed for Shifty
- Thomas Turgoose for Somers Town

=== Best Actress ===
- **Vera Farmiga** for **The Boy in the Striped Pyjamas**
- Kelly Reilly for Eden Lake
- Sally Hawkins for Happy-Go-Lucky
- Samantha Morton for The Daisy Chain
- Keira Knightley for The Duchess

=== Best Supporting Actor ===
- **Eddie Marsan** for **Happy-Go-Lucky**
- Liam Cunningham for Hunger
- Ralph Fiennes for In Bruges
- Daniel Mays for Shifty
- Ralph Fiennes for The Duchess

=== Best Supporting Actress ===
- **Alexis Zegerman** for **Happy-Go-Lucky**
- Emma Thompson for Brideshead Revisited
- Kristin Scott Thomas for Easy Virtue
- Hayley Atwell for The Duchess
- Sienna Miller for The Edge of Love

=== Best Screenplay ===
- **Martin McDonagh** for **In Bruges**
- Steve McQueen and Enda Walsh for Hunger
- Simon Beaufoy for Slumdog Millionaire
- Paul Fraser for Somers Town
- Garth Jennings for Son of Rambow

=== Most Promising Newcomer ===
- **Dev Patel** for **Slumdog Millionaire**
- Ayush Mahesh Khedekar for Slumdog Millionaire
- Bill Milner for Son of Rambow
- Will Poulter for Son of Rambow
- Asa Butterfield for The Boy in the Striped Pyjamas

=== Best Achievement In Production ===
- **The Escapist**
- Hush
- Shifty
- Telstar
- The Daisy Chain

=== Best Technical Achievement ===
- **Sean Bobbitt** for **Hunger**
- Jon Gregory for In Bruges
- Harry Escott and Molly Nyman for Shifty
- Anthony Dod Mantle for Slumdog Millionaire
- Michael O'Connor for The Duchess

=== Best British Documentary ===
- **Man on Wire**
- A Complete History of My Sexual Failures
- Derek
- Of Time and the City
- Three Miles North of Molkom

=== Best British Short ===
- **Soft**
- Alex and her Arse Truck
- Gone Fishing
- Love Does Grow on Trees
- Red Sands (documentary)

=== Best Foreign Film ===
- **Waltz with Bashir (Israel/Germany/France)**
- Gomorrah
- I've Loved You So Long
- Persepolis
- The Diving Bell and the Butterfly

=== Raindance Award ===
- **Zebra Crossings**
- Clubbed
- Flick
- One Day Removals

=== The Richard Harris Award ===
- **David Thewlis**

=== The Variety Award ===
- **Michael Sheen**

=== The Special Jury Prize ===
- **Joe Dunton**
