= Collide (2016 film) =

Action thriller film

- Theatrical release poster
- Directed by: Eran Creevy
- Screenplay by: F. Scott Frazier; Eran Creevy
- Story by: F. Scott Frazier
- Produced by: Joel Silver; Ben Pugh; Rory Aitken; Brian Kavanaugh-Jones; Daniel Hetzer
- Starring: Nicholas Hoult; Felicity Jones; Marwan Kenzari; Ben Kingsley; Anthony Hopkins
- Cinematography: Ed Wild
- Edited by: Chris Gill
- Music by: Ilan Eshkeri
- Production companies: IM Global; Sycamore Pictures; DMG Entertainment; Silver Pictures; Hands-on Producers GmbH; 42; Automatik Entertainment
- Distributed by: Open Road Films (United States); Universum Film (Germany)
- Release dates: August 4, 2016 (Germany); February 24, 2017 (United States)
- Running time: 99 minutes
- Countries: Germany; United States
- Language: English
- Budget: $21.5–29.2 million
- Box office: $6.8 million

Collide is a 2016 action thriller film directed by Eran Creevy, who also co-wrote it with F. Scott Frazier. The film stars Nicholas Hoult, Felicity Jones, Marwan Kenzari, Ben Kingsley, and Anthony Hopkins. The plot follows two young Americans living in Germany who must complete a drug theft from a crime boss in order to pay for a medical operation.

Collide was first announced in May 2013 as Autobahn, with Zac Efron and Amber Heard set to star. After they both dropped out, Hoult and Jones were cast to replace them and filming began in May of the following year.

Collide was released in the United States by Open Road Films and grossed $7 million against its $21.5 million budget, and set a new record for second-weekend drop in box office performance.

== Plot ==
Casey, an American living in Cologne, Germany, works with his friend Matthias for a drug dealer, Geran, as money runners. He meets Juliette, another American, one night while she tends bar at one of Geran's hangouts. Though interested in him, Juliette turns him down when he asks her out, stating that she wants nothing to do with someone who runs in Geran's circles, but to look her up when he gets out. Inspired by the conversation, Casey quits his job with Geran, asks Juliette out, and the two quickly begin dating and move in together. All is well for the pair until Juliette suddenly has a seizure one evening and is rushed to the hospital. Told that her kidney is failing, and because she is not a citizen of Germany that she is unqualified for the transplant treatment, Casey proposes that they move back to America for her treatment. In order to obtain the money for the operation and save Juliette, Casey goes back to work for Geran in order to pull off a large drug theft from Germany's biggest drug dealer, Hagen Kahl.

== Cast ==
- Nicholas Hoult as Casey Stein
- Felicity Jones as Juliette Marne
- Anthony Hopkins as Hagen Kahl
- Ben Kingsley as Geran
- Marwan Kenzari as Matthias
- Clemens Schick as Mirko
- Erdal Yildiz as Rainer
- Michael Epp as Karl
- Aleksandar Jovanović as Jonas
- Markus Klauk as Talaz

== Production ==
On May 15, 2013, Zac Efron and Amber Heard joined the cast of the film, then titled Autobahn, before later dropping out. On May 1, 2014, Nicholas Hoult, Ben Kingsley, Felicity Jones and Anthony Hopkins joined the cast, with Hoult replacing Efron and Jones replacing Heard respectively. Principal photography began on May 5, 2014.

== Release ==
Autobahn was scheduled to be released on October 30, 2015, by Relativity Media. However, when Relativity filed for bankruptcy, producers had put the film, which had since been retitled Collide, back on the market. An issue occurred when the film was listed in Relativity's assets but IM Global later took back the rights for $200,000. In September 2015, it was announced Open Road Films would distribute the film as part of an audit statement. In October 2015, Open Road set an April 1, 2016, release date for the film. It was then pushed back to August 19, In September 2016, it was pushed back to February 3, 2017. In January 2017, the film was pushed back to February 24, 2017.

== Reception ==
=== Box office ===
Collide grossed $2.2 million in the United States and Canada and $4.5 million in other territories for a worldwide gross of $6.8 million.

In North America, Collide opened alongside Get Out and Rock Dog and was expected to gross $3–4 million from 2,045 theaters in its opening weekend. It ended up grossing just $1.5 million, finishing 13th at the box office and marking the 6th-worst-ever debut for a film playing in over 2,000 theaters. In its second weekend the film was pulled from 1,043 theaters and grossed $173,620, dropping 88.5% and marking the biggest-ever second-week decline, breaking the 86.4% set by Undiscovered in 2005.

=== Critical response ===
On the review aggregator website Rotten Tomatoes, 23% of 40 critics' reviews are positive, with an average rating of 4/10. The website's consensus reads: "Collide wastes a talented cast on a would-be thriller fatally undermined by eye-rolling dialogue, logical fallacies, and humdrum set pieces." Metacritic, which uses a weighted average, assigned the film a score of 33 out of 100, based on 10 critics, indicating "generally unfavorable" reviews. Audiences polled by CinemaScore gave the film an average grade of "C+" on an A+ to F scale.

Keith Watson of Slant Magazine praised Creevy for utilizing the German locations when shooting the action set pieces with "a jaunty, confident air" and the "scenery-chewing" delivered by Hopkins and Kingsley, writing about the latter by saying: "It's difficult to begrudge a film that has the good sense to put so much stock in Ben Kingsley's hammy theatrics." Frank Scheck of The Hollywood Reporter commended Creevy and Frazier for adding "amusing, campy touches" to their script that allow both Kingsley and Hopkins to deliver gallows humor but felt it was "forced and artificial", along with the "utterly ludicrous plot machinations" during Casey's escape scenes, concluding that: "The vehicular mayhem is generally well-staged, and the film moves along at a brisk pace during its fat-free, 99-minute running time. But Hoult and Jones are unable to breathe much life into their bland characters, and it's ultimately sad to watch the former Hannibal Lecter and Gandhi reduced to playing silly, tough-guy caricatures." Ignatiy Vishnevetsky of The A.V. Club gave it an overall C grade, commending Creevy's "serviceable" direction of the "modestly conceived action sequences", but said that: "The rest is unexceptional, a hodgepodge of corny voice-over and repetitive, anticlimactic plotting, with Hoult and Jones miscast as a couple of party-hardy American expats." Marc Savlov of The Austin Chronicle called it "a mediocre-at-best chase film" that Creevy and cinematographer Ed Wild shoot with "little visual flair" and a lack of inventiveness outside of the Autobahn pursuit, concluding that "Collide is a cheap genre product produced with an eye on foreign market box office. Wake me when Dominic Toretto torques his way into Havana."
