= Cashmere (Swet Shop Boys album) =

Studio album by Swet Shop Boys
- Released: October 14, 2016
- Genre: Hip-hop
- Length: 34:55
- Label: Customs
- Producer: Redinho

Swet Shop Boys chronology
| Swet Shop (2014) | Cashmere (2016) | Sufi La (2017) |

Cashmere is the debut studio album by Swet Shop Boys. It was released via Customs on October 14, 2016. It peaked at number 45 on Billboard's Top R&B/Hip-Hop Albums chart. Redinho handled the production, while rappers Heems and Riz MC shared vocal duties. Music videos were created for "T5", "Zayn Malik", and "Aaja".

== Critical reception ==
Professional ratings
Aggregate scores
| Source | Rating |
|---|---|
| Metacritic | 80/100 |
Review scores
| Source | Rating |
| AllMusic | 4/5 stars |
| Clash | 7/10 |
| Consequence of Sound | B |
| DIY | 4/5 stars |
| Exclaim! | 9/10 |
| Pitchfork | 7.4/10 |
| PopMatters | 7/10 stars |
| Vice | Invalid parameter to {{Rating-Christgau}} |

At Metacritic, which assigns a weighted average score out of 100 to reviews from mainstream critics, the album received an average score of 80, based on 8 reviews, indicating "generally favorable reviews".

Chris Dart of Exclaim! wrote, "it's full of three-minute gems that get your head nodding and your brain working hard to parse multi-layered metaphors, and that stop when you're still wanting more." Tanner Smith of PopMatters described it as "an undeniably complicated but fun album that reckons with South Asian representation in the global pop culture of 2016."

It was placed at number 36 on NME's "Albums of the Year 2016" list, number 24 on Rolling Stone's "40 Best Rap Albums of 2016" list, and number 27 on Vice's "100 Best Albums of 2016" list.

== Track listing ==
| No. | Title | Length |
|---|---|---|
| 1. | "T5" | 2:27 |
| 2. | "Shottin" | 3:23 |
| 3. | "Aaja" | 3:19 |
| 4. | "Zayn Malik" | 2:54 |
| 5. | "Tiger Hologram" | 2:56 |
| 6. | "No Fly List" | 2:51 |
| 7. | "Phone Tap" | 3:02 |
| 8. | "Half Moghul Half Mowgli" | 3:25 |
| 9. | "Swish Swish" | 3:52 |
| 10. | "Shoes Off" | 3:11 |
| 11. | "Din-e-iLahi" | 3:35 |

== Charts ==
| Chart (2016) | Peak position |
|---|---|
| US Top R&B/Hip-Hop Albums (Billboard) | 45 |
