= Joel Culpepper =

- Born: 25 May 1984 (age 42); London, England
- Genres: Alternative R&B, soul, trip hop
- Occupation: Singer-songwriter
- Years active: 2009 – present
- Website: www.joelculpepper.com

Joel Culpepper (born 25 May 1984) is an English R&B singer-songwriter from London, England. Originally from Peckham, then grew up in Catford. He is known for his distinctive vocal style and well received stage performances.

== Career ==
=== 2009–2015 ===
Debuting in 2009, Culpepper's first mixtape, The Adventures of Pensmith, was written and produced in two weeks.

This was followed in 2011 with another mixtape, Joel Culpepper Meets J Dilla, a tribute to the late producer and rapper J Dilla. This release sought to build on previous successes and add to the growing interest from bloggers and music fans.

In 2012 Culpepper released his first EP, Skydive, a project that received support from several notable DJs. The first single off the EP, "Passenger", was championed by Annie Mac, DJ Target and MistaJam.

Culpepper's next single, "Pilot Light", was released on 7 July 2014 alongside B-side "Some Nights".

Culpepper often collaborates with Swindle, and was featured on Swindle's album Long Live The Jazz, as well as on Bruh Jackman's California.

=== 2016–2020 ===
Culpepper released his EP, Tortoise, in January 2017 via Pledge Music, the latest milestone in his career. Its title is inspired by one of Aesop's Fables the Tortoise and the Hare. The EP features production by Grammy Award-winning producer Jimmy Hogarth, American producer Roy Davis Jr, Kay Young and Jools Holland's Musical Director Phil Veacock, who scored and arranged the strings and horns. It journeys through different genres, from traditional 1960s and 1970s inspired R&B to contemporary electronic R&B and hip-hop.

The first single taken from the EP was "Don't Mean I'm in Love", and was released on 2 June 2017. Culpepper also released "Woman" in 2017 and performed a ColorsxStudios video.

In 2018, Culpepper released 'Caroline No' featuring Rapper/Singer Kojey Radical.

In 2019, Culpepper featured on DJ Yoda's collaborative release "Home Cooking". He also released "Sheriff" with multi-instrumentalist Redinho.

In October 2020 Culpepper announced that he would be releasing his debut album through his own label imprint Pepper Records.

In 2020 Culpepper appeared alongside Tom Misch, Yussef Dayes, Rocco Palladino, John Mayer and Tom Driessler during a Tiny Desk Performance.

=== 2021–present ===
In June 2021 Culpepper performed "Tears of a Crown" on the BBC's Later... with Jools Holland.

On 23 July 2021 the album Sgt Culpepper was released. With Executive Production from Swindle, other producers and collaborators include Guy Chambers, Tom Misch, Kay Young, Lindne Jay, Redinho, Jimmy Hogarth, Raf Rundell, Rich de Rosa and Shawn Lee.

Culpepper recorded a rendition of "Silver Lining" for the 2025 tribute album Chet Baker Re:imagined.

== Touring ==
May 2015 saw Culpepper support Paloma Faith on her Australian tour.

Culpepper also tours with his band The Transformers who, as the name suggests, play at least two instruments during the set.

In July 2018, Joel Culpepper supported Lalah Hathaway at a sold-out show at London's KOKO.

In April 2019, Culpepper performed two nights in a row at the Cully Jazz Festival in Switzerland, where he was well received on two stages, Le Club and Chapiteau. He supported Stevie Wonder at Hyde Park British Summer Time. Performed with Swindle at Glastonbury on the West Holts stage, made a guest appearance at FKJ's London show at Brixton Academy and sold out his headline show at Earth in Hackney.

== Critical reception ==
Following the release of "Pilot Light" Culpepper was BBC introducing artist of the week during the month of June 2014.

Since 2012 and the release of Culpepper's debut EP, Skydive, he has garnered attention from the likes of BBC Radio 1 and BBC 1Xtra. George Ergatoudis (then Head of Music, BBC Radio 1) dubbed him the "UK's answer to Frank Ocean". Culpepper continues to generate fresh interest with radio support from DJ Target, Trevor Nelson, Annie Mac, Charlie Sloth and Toddla T. Culpepper was among a select few acts to receive coveted support from the Momentum Music Fund, a partnership between the PRS Foundation and Arts Council England, in association with Spotify.

In 2017, Culpepper performed the track 'Woman' on the Colors platform. Which to date has over 13 million views.

In 2020, Joel Culpepper featured on a track entitled 'Thinking' produced by Former Arctic Monkeys bassist Goldteeth. The single received widespread support from Nick Grimshaw, Lauren Laverne, Clara Amfo, Phil Taggart and Huw Stephens. The single was also Radio 1's track of the week.

== Discography ==
=== Albums ===
- Sgt Culpepper (23 July 2021)

=== EPs ===
- Skydive (1 October 2012)
- Tortoise (27 January 2017)

=== Singles ===
- "Passenger" (October 2012)
- "Heaven" (May 2013)
- "B.I.G." (October 2013)
- "Pilot Light" (July 2014)
- "Don't Mean I'm in Love" (2 June 2017)
- "Caroline No" (7 December 2018)
- "Sheriff" (31 October 2019)
