= Riz Ahmed =

British actor and rapper (born 1982)

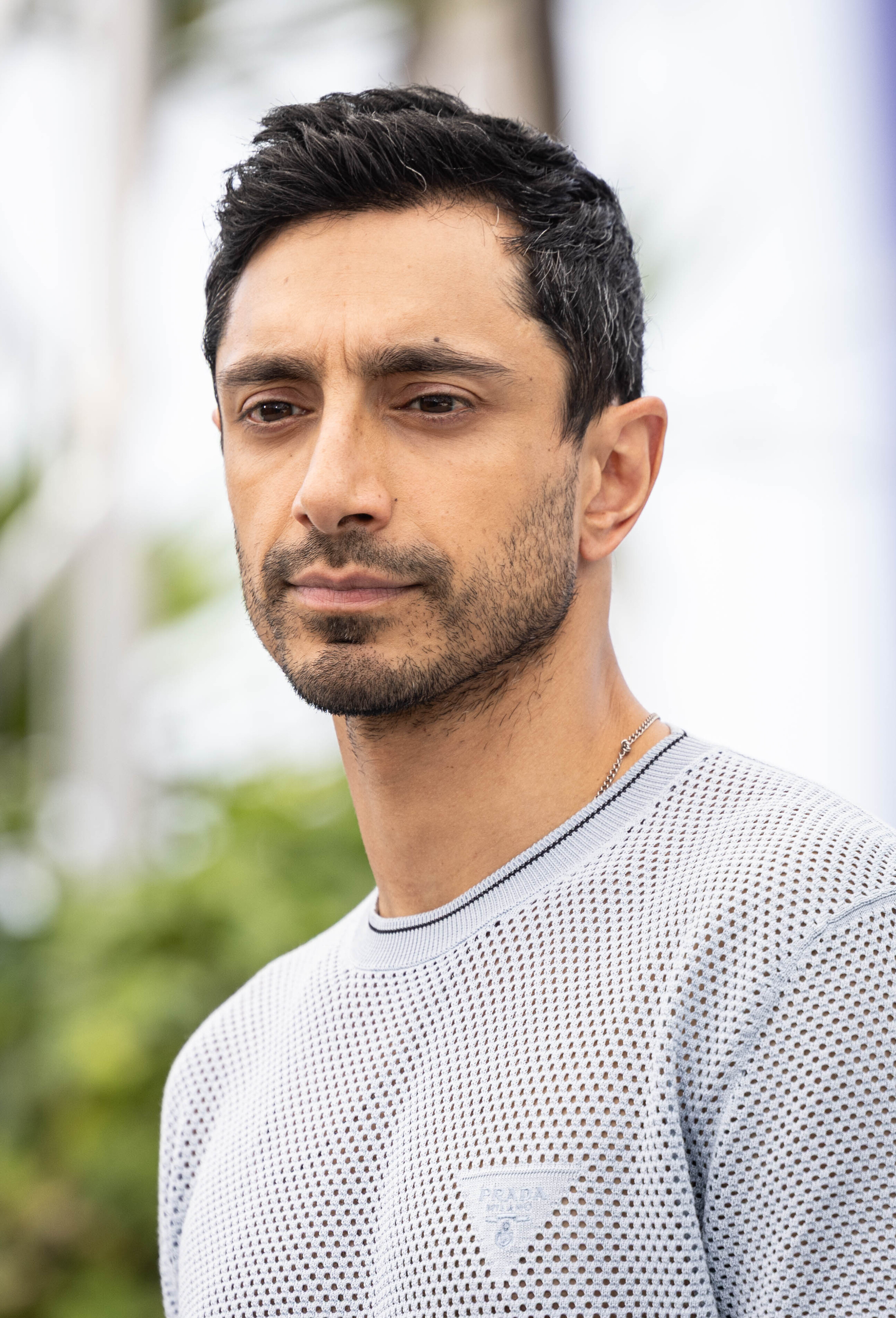
- Ahmed at the 2025 Cannes Film Festival
- Born: Rizwan Ahmed; 1 December 1982 (age 43); London, England
- Education: Merchant Taylors' School, Northwood; Christ Church, Oxford; Royal Central School of Drama
- Occupation: Actor
- Years active: 2006–present
- Spouse: Fatima Farheen Mirza (m. 2020)
- Children: 1
- Awards: Full list
- Musical career
- Also known as: Riz MC
- Genres: Hip-hop; political hip-hop; British hip-hop; alternative rap; conscious; qawwali
- Years active: 2006–present
- Labels: Battered (Note: Self-owned indie hip-hop label.); Crosstown Rebels; Tru Thoughts; Customs; Mongrel
- Member of: Swet Shop Boys

Rizwan Ahmed (Note: Urdu pronunciation: [ɾɪzˌwɑːn ˈɛɦˌməd̪].) (born 1 December 1982) is a British actor and rapper. He has received several awards, including an Academy Award and a Primetime Emmy Award, and nominations for two Golden Globe Awards and two British Academy Film Awards. In 2017, he was named by Time as one of the most influential people in the world. He also created the TV series Englistan in 2018 for the BBC, which was also his writing debut.

After studying acting at the Royal Central School of Speech and Drama, Ahmed began his acting career with independent films such as The Road to Guantanamo (2006), Shifty (2008), Four Lions (2010), Trishna (2011), and The Reluctant Fundamentalist (2012). He had his break-out role in Nightcrawler (2014), which led to roles in the 2016 big-budget films Jason Bourne and Rogue One. For starring as a young man accused of murder in the HBO miniseries The Night Of (2016), Ahmed won the Primetime Emmy Award for Outstanding Lead Actor in a Limited Series. He received another Emmy nomination in the same year for his guest role in Girls. He went on to play Carlton Drake in the superhero film Venom (2018) and a drummer who loses his hearing in the drama film Sound of Metal (2019). The latter earned him a nomination for the Academy Award for Best Actor. He produced, co-wrote, and starred in Mogul Mowgli (2020), which earned a nomination for the BAFTA Award for Outstanding British Film.

As a rapper, Ahmed is a member of the Swet Shop Boys, and has earned critical acclaim with the hip-hop albums Microscope and Cashmere, and commercial success featuring in the Billboard 200 chart-topping Hamilton Mixtape, with his song "Immigrants (We Get the Job Done)" winning an MTV Video Music Award. His second studio album, The Long Goodbye, was accompanied by a short film of the same name, which won him the Academy Award for Best Live Action Short Film.

== Early life and education ==
Ahmed was born on 1 December 1982 in Wembley, a suburb in the London Borough of Brent, to a British Pakistani family of Muhajir background. His parents moved to England from Karachi, Pakistan, during the 1970s. Ahmed's father was a shipping broker, and he is a descendant of Shah Muhammad Sulaiman, the first Indian Chief Justice of the Allahabad High Court. His older brother, Kamran, is a psychiatrist, and his older sister is a lawyer.

Ahmed attended Merchant Taylors' School, Northwood, through a scholarship programme. Ahmed and journalist Mehdi Hasan were classmates, and Hasan's mother was Ahmed's general practitioner. He graduated from Christ Church, Oxford University, with a degree in Philosophy, Politics and Economics (PPE). He experienced a culture shock at Oxford, nearly dropping out due to the isolating atmosphere. Instead, Ahmed organised parties to celebrate cultures which did not conform to the dominant "elitist, white" and "black-tie" culture of Oxford. He later studied acting at the Royal Central School of Speech and Drama.

== Acting career ==
=== 2000s ===
Ahmed's film career began in the 2006 Michael Winterbottom film The Road to Guantánamo, in which he played the part of Shafiq Rasul, a member of the Tipton Three. He and another actor involved in the film were detained at Luton Airport upon their return from the Berlin Film Festival where the film won a Silver Bear Award. Ahmed alleged that during questioning, police asked him whether he had become an actor to further the Islamic cause, questioned him on his views of the Iraq War, verbally abused him, and denied him access to a telephone.

In 2007, he portrayed Sohail Waheed in the Channel 4 drama, Britz. Ahmed then portrayed Riq in the five-part horror thriller Dead Set for E4 and Manesh Kunzru in ITV1's Wired in 2008. Also that year he played a primary school teacher in Staffroom Monologues for the specialist channel Teachers TV. In July 2009, he appeared in Freefall alongside Sarah Harding. He featured in the title role of the 2009 independent film Shifty, directed by Eran Creevy, where he plays a day in the life of a charismatic young drug dealer. He was nominated for Best Actor at the 2008 British Independent Film Awards.

=== 2010s ===
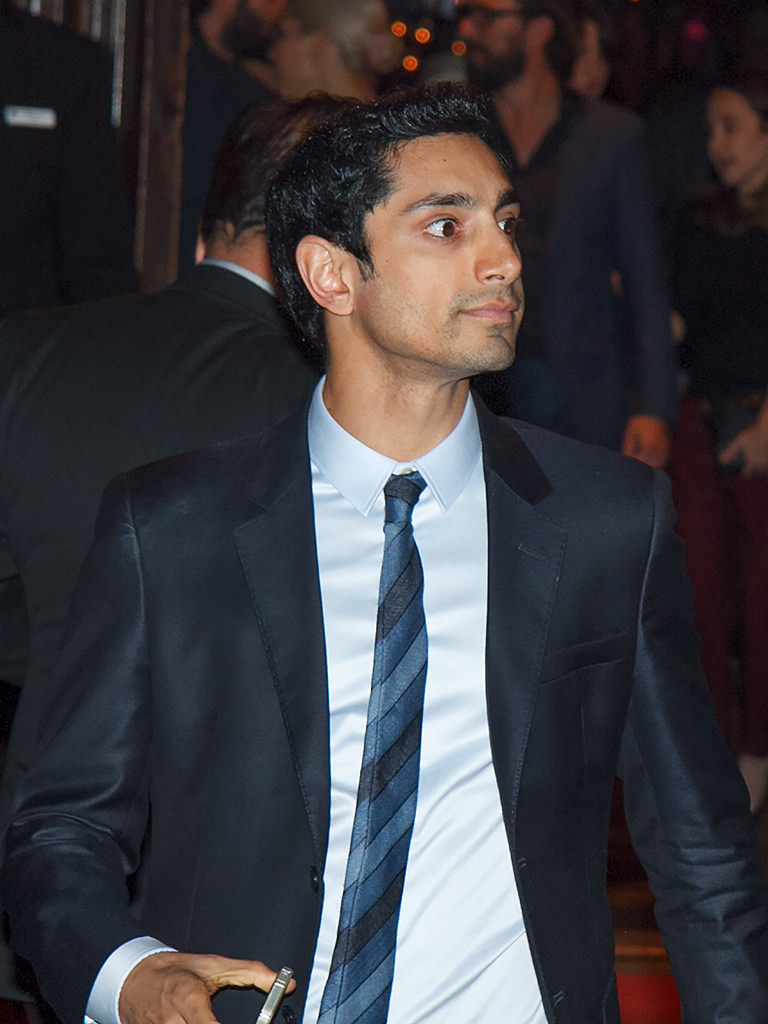
Ahmed at the 2014 Toronto Film Festival

Continuing his film career, he featured in the 2009 Sally Potter production of Rage and in 2010, starred in Chris Morris' satire on terrorism, Four Lions, for which he received his second British Independent Film Award nomination for Best Actor. Ahmed also had a supporting role in Neil Marshall's historical thriller Centurion. In 2012, he starred as one of the leading roles in the London-based film Ill Manors, directed by Plan B. Ahmed received his third British Independent Film Award nomination for Best Actor. He assumed the lead role in Mira Nair's adaptation of the best-selling novel by Mohsin Hamid, The Reluctant Fundamentalist, alongside Kate Hudson, Kiefer Sutherland, Om Puri, Shabana Azmi, and Liev Schreiber.

Ahmed is also known for his stage performances such as in the Asian Dub Foundation opera Gaddafi and a starring role as psychotic serial-killer-turned-born-again-Christian Lucius in the Lighthouse Theatre's acclaimed production of Stephen Adly Guirgis's Jesus Hopped the 'A' Train (directed by Jack William Clift and Thomas Sweatman) as well as in Shan Khan's Prayer Room.

Ahmed directed and wrote a 2014 short film, Daytimer. It won the Best Live Action Short award at Nashville Film Festival, and was nominated for the Short Film Grand Jury Prize at the Sundance Film Festival. In 2014, Ahmed appeared in Dan Gilroy's Nightcrawler. Ahmed received acclaim for his portrayal in the film and gained numerous awards nominations during awards season. Riz Ahmed was one of seventy-five actors to audition for the role of Rick. The British actor was attending a friend's wedding in Los Angeles, when his talent agent suggested he meet Gilroy to discuss the film's script. Gilroy told Ahmed that he had seen his previous work; he was not fit for the role, but still allowed him to audition. Within the first minute of his audition tape, however, Gilroy felt confident in the actor's abilities. To prepare for the role, Ahmed met with homeless people in Skid Row, and researched homeless shelters to "understand the system". He found that most of the people dealt with abandonment issues, and attempted to replicate this in Rick's abusive relationship with Lou.

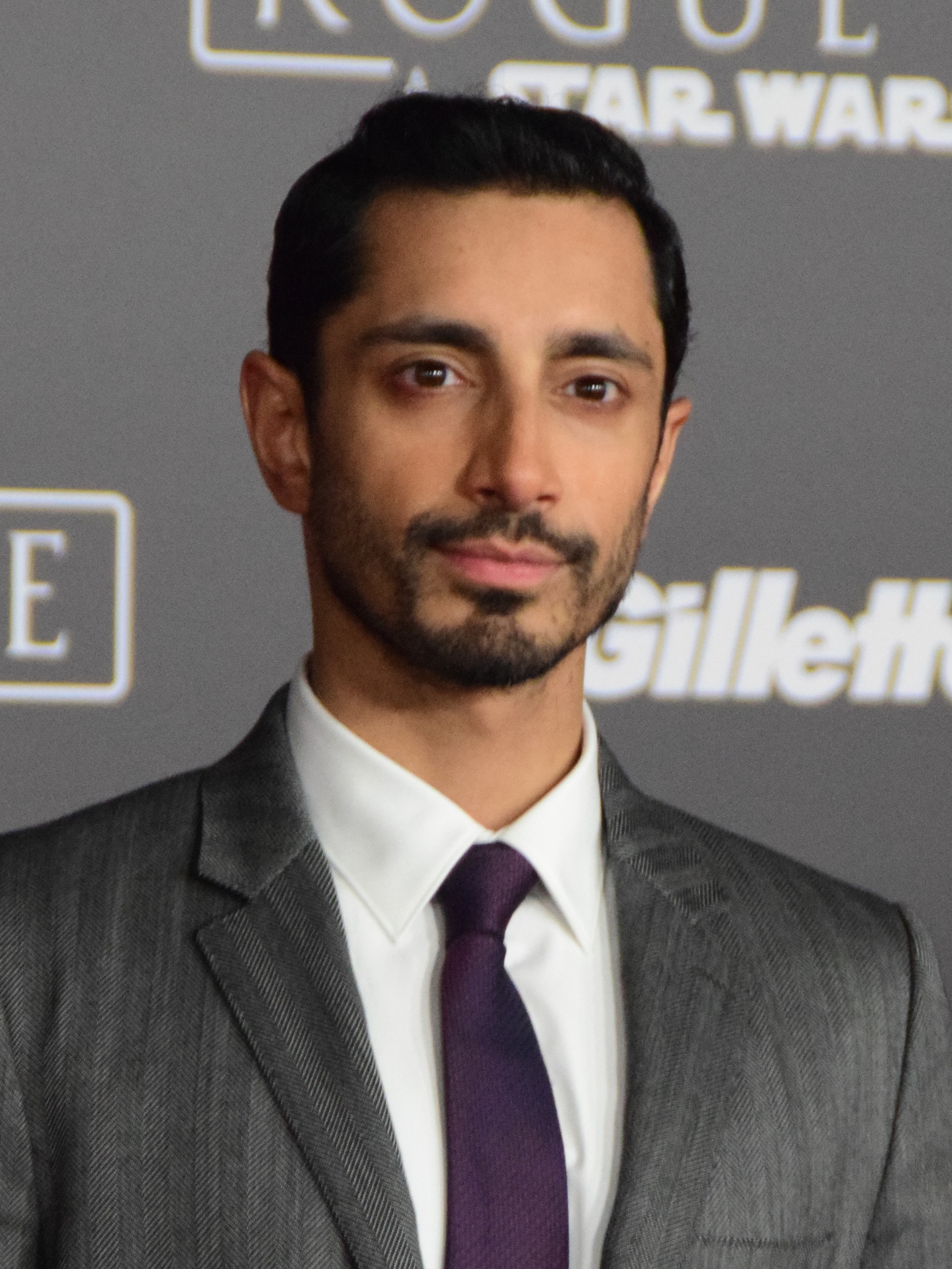
Ahmed at the premiere of Rogue One in 2016

In 2016, he appeared in Rogue One, the first film in the new Star Wars anthology films as Bodhi Rook, a defected imperial pilot. The film garnered critical acclaim and earned Ahmed a nomination for the Best Male Newcomer at the Empire Awards. The film was a commercial success and became Disney's fourth of 2016 to earn $1 billion in ticket sales. It is the second highest-grossing film of 2016, the third highest-grossing Star Wars film, and the 22nd highest-grossing film of all time, all unadjusted for inflation. In the United States, it was the top-grossing film of 2016. Deadline Hollywood calculated the net profit of the film to be $319.6 million, when factoring together all expenses and revenues for the film, making it the 3rd most profitable release of 2016.

In 2016, Ahmed played the role of Nasir "Naz" Khan in the HBO miniseries The Night Of, and once again received universal praise for his performance, earning him Emmy, Golden Globe and Screen Actors Guild Award nominations. He also appeared in the final season of Girls, earning him another Emmy nomination. At the 69th Primetime Emmy Awards, Ahmed won the award for Outstanding Lead Actor in a Limited Series or Movie for his performance in The Night Of, winning over Robert De Niro, Benedict Cumberbatch, Ewan McGregor, Geoffrey Rush and co-star John Turturro. This made Ahmed the first Asian and first Muslim to win in the category, the first South Asian male to win an acting Emmy, and the first Muslim and first South Asian to win a lead acting Emmy; the only previous South Asian to win an acting Emmy was British Asian actress Archie Panjabi for a supporting role in 2010.

In 2017, it was rumoured that Ahmed was to play Hamlet in a Netflix adaptation of the Shakespeare play, which Ahmed later confirmed.

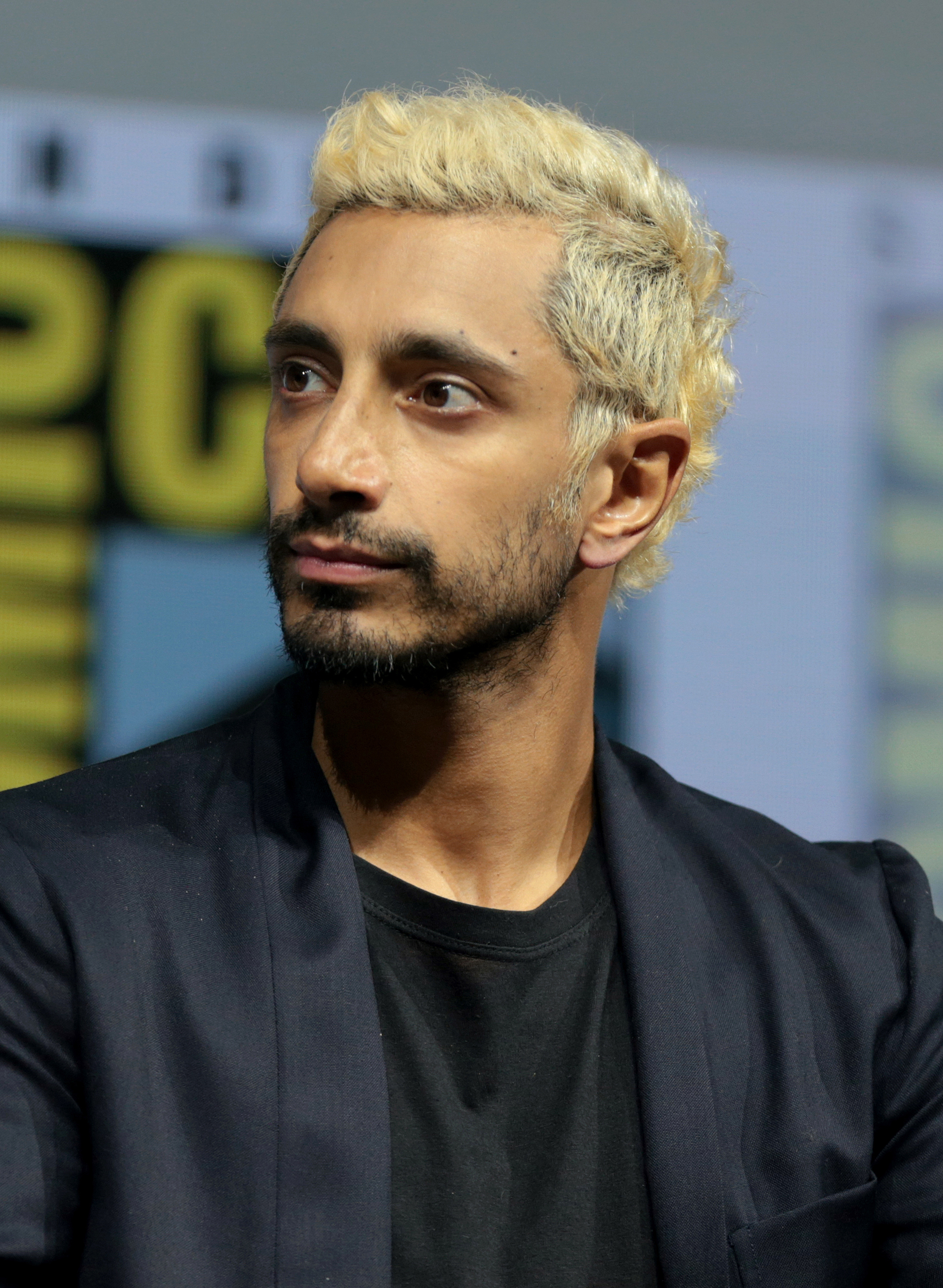
Ahmed at the 2018 San Diego Comic-Con

In 2018, Ahmed starred in Venom in the dual role of Carlton Drake, the Life Foundation's leader experimenting on symbiotes, and Riot, a symbiote team leader allied with Drake who seeks to invade Earth. Ahmed explained that Drake is trying to save the future of humanity when he discovers the symbiote, with Fleischer adding that Drake has a positive goal but a "moral ambiguity" that leads to him testing his science on other people.

As of 2018, films that Ahmed had been involved in had collectively grossed $2.4 billion at the worldwide box office.

Following his mixtape under the same name, Ahmed's Englistan, an original TV series was commissioned by BBC Two and Left Handed Films in 2018. The series will tell the story of three generations of a British Pakistani family. Ahmed describes the series as "a period drama – unlike any other period drama you have seen before." More currently, his production company secured a first look deal with Amazon.

=== 2020s ===
Ahmed starred in the American drama film Sound of Metal, which was distributed by Amazon Studios and released in 2020, after having premiered at the Toronto International Film Festival in 2019. Ahmed plays a drummer who loses his hearing. The film co-stars Olivia Cooke as his girlfriend, and Paul Raci as the leader of a Deaf retreat. IndieWire film critic Eric Kohn praised Ahmed's performance, writing "Ahmed's so believable that he keeps the suspense of the drama in play even as it pushes into contrived circumstances during the prolonged final act, and eventually takes a melodramatic plunge." For his performance he has received Academy Award, Golden Globe Award, Screen Actors Guild Award, BAFTA Award, Critics Choice Award, and Independent Spirit Award nominations. He is the first Muslim and British Pakistani actor to be nominated for the Academy Award for Best Actor.

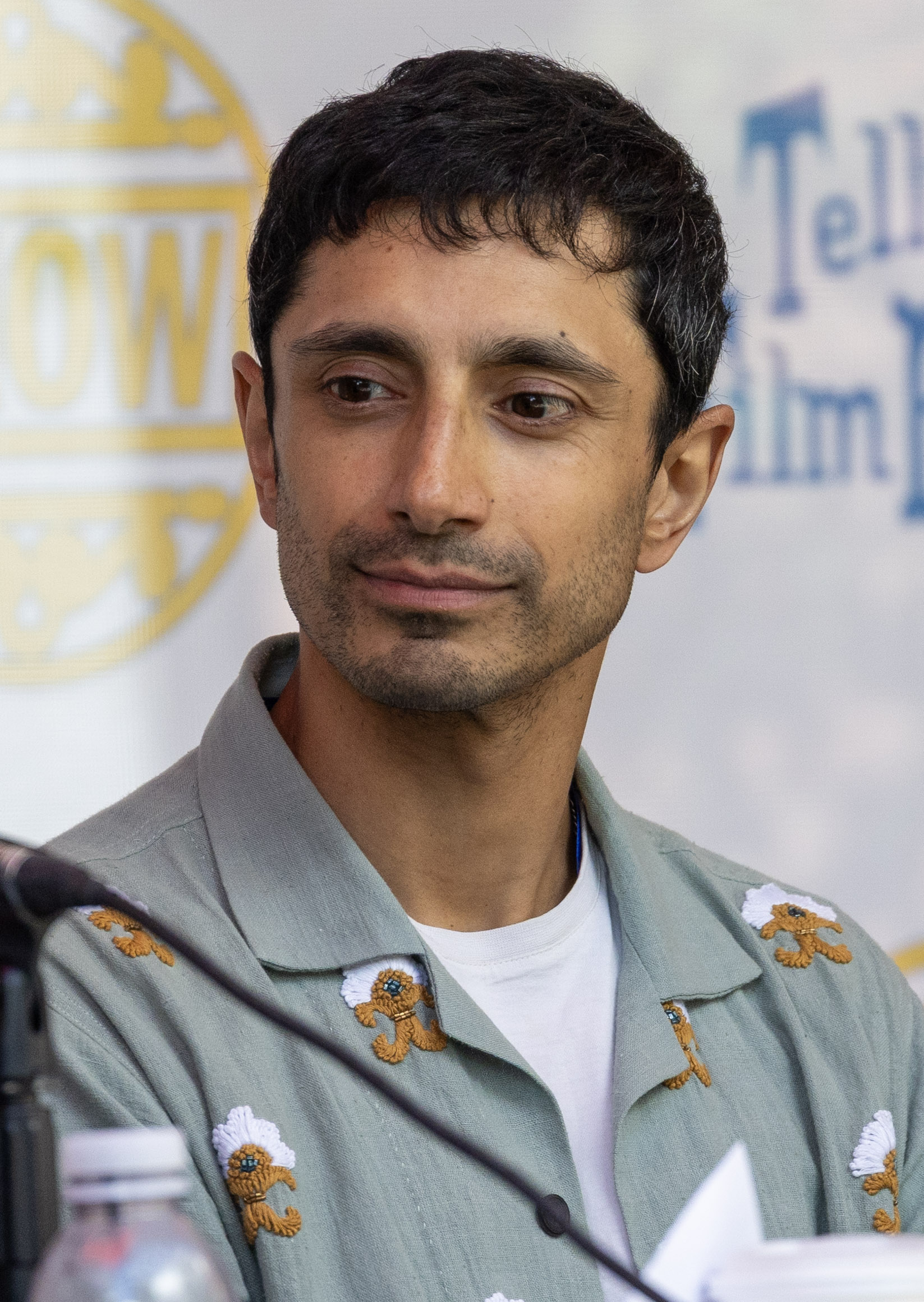
Ahmed at the 2025 Telluride Film Festival

In 2021, Ahmed also executive produced the animated documentary film Flee which made its international debut at the Sundance Film Festival. The film was universally praised by critics and nominated for Best International Feature Film, Best Documentary Feature and Best Animated Feature at the 94th Academy Awards .

In February 2021, Ahmed was nominated and won in the best debut screenwriter category for the film Mogul Mowgli at the delayed British Independent Film Awards 2020. Starring in the main role as a British-Pakistani rapper, The Guardian film critic Wendy Ide praised his "blistering performance" on screen.

In August 2021, Ahmed was named as head of the Platform Prize jury for the 2021 Toronto International Film Festival. In November 2021, Ahmed was announced as a recipient of the Richard Harris Award, which is given to an actor or actress who has "contributed significantly to British films throughout their career".

The Long Goodbye also was adapted into a short film, directed by Aneil Karia. It won Best Live Action Short Film at the 94th Academy Awards. Ahmed voiced Ballister Boldheart in Nimona, which released on 30 June 2023 on Netflix. He also starred in Fingernails, which was released on 27 October 2023 by Apple Original Films. He has an upcoming role in the independent film Relay. In November 2023 Riz Ahmed and his company Left Handed Films joined the 2023 SXSW audience award winner Mustache. In August 2025, it was announced that Ahmed would be voicing Professor Snape in Harry Potter: The Full-Cast Audio Editions, a production of Audible and J.K. Rowling's Pottermore.

In 2026, Ahmed starred in Bait, a limited television series in which he is also the writer and executive producer. He plays Shah Latif, an actor from Pakistani Muslim set to play a non-white James Bond. The series and his performance received critical acclaim, and garnered him his second Emmy nomination for Outstanding Lead Actor in a Limited or Anthology Series or Movie.

== Music career ==
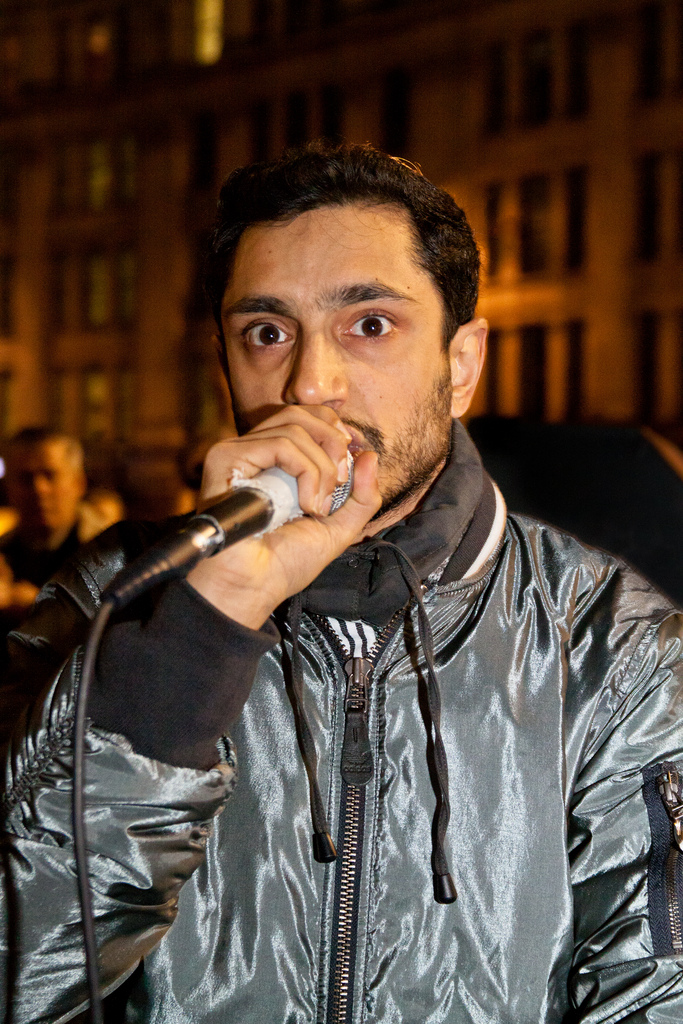
Ahmed performing at Occupy London NYE Party 2011.

Inspired by jungle and hip-hop, his music career began in his mid-teens, appearing on pirate radio and in freestyle rap battles. While at university, Ahmed co-founded the Hit & Run night in Oxford, which has since moved to Manchester and gone on to become one of Manchester's leading underground music events. At Oxford, he was also part of a 12-person jazz-house/electronica band called Confidential Collective. After graduating, he competed in and won many rap battle competitions. He competed as Riz MC on JumpOff TV's "Spin the Mic" freestyle rap battle contest in 2006. He beat contestants Stig and Skilla Mic, before a controversial loss to contest winner Whatshisface; according to JumpOff TV, Riz was at a disadvantage due to racial double standards from the crowd.

In 2006, Ahmed recorded a satirical social-commentary rap track entitled "Post 9/11 Blues", which he wrote after being detained in Luton. It was leaked by friends and first gained popularity through the internet. The song was initially banned from British airplay because the lyrics were deemed "politically sensitive", including satirical references to 9/11, terrorism, the post-9/11 climate, Iraq War, death of Jean Charles de Menezes, the MI6, and Belmarsh prison. The resulting press coverage, however, prompted some independent radio stations to play the track. He soon founded his own independent record label, Battered Records, officially releasing "Post 9/11 Blues" for the CD and MP3 formats in August 2006. He went on to win Best MC at the 2006 Asian Music Awards. He released his second single in 2007, the garage rap song "People Like People". He was selected as a BBC Introducing artist in 2007, playing the Glastonbury Festival and the BBC Electric Proms. He opened the Meltdown Festival with Bristol-based trip-hop group Massive Attack at the Royal Festival Hall in 2008, and was appointed 'Emerging Artist in Residence' at the Southbank Centre in London. He played at the London Camp for Climate Action in August 2009.

In 2011, he released his debut album, Microscope, which was re-released with additional remixes in 2012. On 1 December 2011, it was announced that Riz MC had signed to Tru Thoughts, an independent label in Brighton. From Microscope, he released "Sour Times" which was accompanied by a video featuring Scroobius Pip, Plan B, Tom Hardy, and Jim Sturgess. Formed in 2014, Ahmed is half of the hip-hop duo Swet Shop Boys along with Heems. Their debut release, Swet Shop EP, was released in 2014. The group's debut full-length effort, Cashmere, was released on 14 October 2016, and received critical acclaim. In 2016, he also released a mixtape, Englistan. He was featured on the song "Immigrants (We Get The Job Done)" in The Hamilton Mixtape, which topped the Billboard 200 chart. This put him in the unique position of sitting at number-one on both the Billboard 200 album chart and the movie box office chart (with Rogue One) at the same time. At the 2017 MTV Video Music Awards (VMAs), "Immigrants" won the award for Best Fight Against the System, giving him the rare distinction of winning both the Emmy and VMA awards.

== The Riz Test ==
In 2018, Sadia Habib and Shaf Choudry, two researchers in the UK, were inspired by Ahmed to determine a method to quantify the nature of Muslim representation in film and TV. Ultimately they came up with a test they named "The Riz Test", which has been compared to the Bechdel test. The test came about following a speech given by Ahmed in 2017 at the House of Commons, in which he addressed what he views as a lack of diversity in film and television. Ahmed has spoken about the lack of accurate representation of Muslims in the arts, and often expresses these views on social media.

The Riz Test has five parts which, according to the creators, serve to highlight and combat the stereotypes of Muslims found in characters in films and on TV:

1. If a character is identifiably Muslim, is the character talking about, the victim of, or the perpetrator of terrorism?
2. Presented as irrationally angry?
3. Presented as superstitious, culturally backward or anti-modern?
4. Presented as a threat to a Western way of life?
5. If the character is male, is he presented as misogynistic? or if female, is she presented as oppressed by her male counterparts?

One of the tests' creators, Shaf Choudry, describes the test as not being "a scientific measure of Islamophobia, it’s more to prop conversation."

Ahmed acknowledged the test in 2018, expressing his surprise at the test being named after him and writing on Twitter that he was "glad to see this" and that he thought it was "much needed."

== Activism ==
As a practicing Muslim, Ahmed has spoken candidly about negative stereotyping of Muslims, both in a personal and societal context.

As an activist, he has been involved in raising funds for Syrian refugee children and advocating representation at the House of Commons. He has also been involved in raising awareness of the displacement of Rohingya Muslims from Myanmar, after Rohingya genocide, and raising funds for Rohingya refugees in Bangladesh.

In 2013, Ahmed provided journalist Hardeep Singh Kohli with a formal apology for a tweet he had published in which he called Singh a "bigot" and falsely accused him of attempted assault. Ahmed also agreed to pay him substantial damages for libel and his legal costs.

In 2016, he contributed an essay for The Good Immigrant, on racial profiling at airports, auditions, and the implicit need to leave himself at a door to be waved through.

During the Gaza war, Ahmed called for Israel to stop its "indiscriminate bombing of Gaza’s civilians and vital infrastructure, the denial of food, water and electricity, the forced displacement of people from their homes", which he called "morally indefensible war crimes". In 2023, he signed the Artists4Ceasefire letter addressed to then U.S. President Joe Biden. Ahmed later signed Artists for Palestine UK letters calling upon Keir Starmer to commit to halting arms sales to Israel ahead of the 2024 general election and to the BBC condemning "censorship of Palestine" after the documentary Gaza: How to Survive a Warzone (2025) was pulled. He is a signatory of the Film Workers for Palestine boycott pledge that was published in September 2025.

Riz Ahmed’s work as an actor and musician is closely intertwined with his political activism, particularly around issues of racial justice, immigration, Islamophobia, and representation of marginalised communities.

== Personal life ==
Ahmed has been married to American novelist Fatima Farheen Mirza since 2020. In 2025, Ahmed revealed that Mirza gave birth to their first child.

== Filmography ==
=== Film ===
Key
†	Denotes films that have not yet been released

Year	Title	Role	Notes	Ref.
2006	The Road to Guantánamo	Shafiq		
2008	Shifty	Shifty		
2008	Baghdad Express	Talal	Short film	
2009	Rage	Vijay		
2010	Four Lions	Omar		
2010	Centurion	Tarak		
2011	Black Gold	Ali		
2011	Trishna	Jay		
2012	Ill Manors	Aaron		
2012	The Reluctant Fundamentalist	Changez Khan		
2013	Closed Circuit	Nazrul Sharma		
2013	Out of Darkness	Male	Short film	
2014	Daytimer	—N/a	Director, writer; Short film	
2014	Nightcrawler	Rick		
2016	Jason Bourne	Aaron Kalloor		
2016	Una	Scott		
2016	City of Tiny Lights	Tommy Akhtar		
2016	Rogue One	Bodhi Rook		
2018	The Sisters Brothers	Hermann Kermit Warm		
2018	Venom	Carlton Drake and Riot (voice)		
2019	Sound of Metal	Ruben Stone	Also executive producer	
2019	Weathering with You	Takai (voice)	English dub	
2020	Mogul Mowgli	Zed	Also co-writer and producer	
2020	The Long Goodbye	Riz	Short film; also co-writer	
2021	Flee	Amin Nawabi (voice)	Also executive producer	
2021	Encounter	Malik Khan		
2022	Moshari	—N/a	Executive producer; Short film	
2023	Nimona	Ballister Boldheart (voice)		
2023	Fingernails	Amir		
2024	Relay	Ash		
2025	The Phoenician Scheme	Prince Farouk		
2025	Hamlet	Prince Hamlet	Also producer	
2026	Digger	Ganesh		
2027	The Big Fix †		Filming	

=== Television ===
Key
†	Denotes television productions that have not yet been released

Year	Title	Role	Notes	Ref.
2006	The Path to 9/11	Yosri	2 episodes	
2006	Berry's Way	Amir	Television film	
2007	Britz	Sohail Wahid	2 episodes	
2008	Wired	Manesh Kunzru	3 episodes	
2008	Staffroom Monologues	Primary Teacher	"How Are You?" Episode for Teachers TV	
2008	Dead Set	Riq	5 episodes	
2009	Freefall	Gary	Television film	
2011	The Fades	Neil	Episode: "Episode 1" - Unaired Pilot	
2016	The Night Of	Nasir Khan	Miniseries; 8 episodes	
2016–2019	The OA	Elias Rahim	5 episodes	
2017	Girls	Paul-Louis	2 episodes	
2026	Bait	Shah Latif	Also creator, writer, and one of the lead executive producers (co-showrunner)	
2026	Saturday Night Live UK	Himself (host)	Episode: "Riz Ahmed/Kasabian"	

=== Audiobooks ===
Year	Title	Role	Production company	Ref.
2020	The Sandman	The Corinthian	Audible	
2020	Assassin's Creed: Gold	Omar Khaled	Audible	
2025–2026	Harry Potter: The Full-Cast Audio Editions	Professor Severus Snape	Audible	

== Discography ==
=== Studio albums ===
List of albums, with selected details
Title	Album details
Microscope (as Riz MC)	Released: 31 January 2011; Label: Confirm/Ignore; Formats: Digital download
The Long Goodbye	Released: 6 March 2020; Label: Mongrel; Formats: Digital download, streaming

=== Mixtapes ===
List of mixtapes, with selected details
Title	Album details
Englistan	Released: 26 May 2016; Label: Riz MC; Formats: Digital download

=== Singles ===
List of singles, showing year released and album name
Title	Year	Album
"The Post 9/11 Blues"	2006	Non-album single
"People Like People"	2007	Non-album single
"Radar"	2008	Microscope
"Shifty" (with Sway & Plan B)	2009	Shifty
"Don't Sleep"	2009	Non-album single
"Hundreds and Thousands"	2010	Non-album single
"Get on It"	2010	Non-album single
"All of You"	2011	Microscope
"Mogambo"	2018	The Long Goodbye
"Once Kings"	2020	Non-album single

=== Appearances ===
Title	Year	Album
"Flush"	2010	Beautiful Losers
"Immigrants (We Get the Job Done)"	2016	The Hamilton Mixtape
"Stand Up"	2019	Ninja TED: A benefit for the Vancouver Food Bank
"Let the Sunshine In" (with Full Ninja TED cast)	2019	Ninja TED: A benefit for the Vancouver Food Bank
"Promises"	2022	Give Me the Future

== See also ==
- List of British Pakistanis
- List of Academy Award winners and nominees from Great Britain
- List of Pakistani Academy Award winners and nominees
- List of actors with Academy Award nominations
- List of actors nominated for Academy Awards for non-English performances
- List of Primetime Emmy Award winners
