= Redinho =

English musician, DJ, and producer

- Born: Tom Calvert
- Origin: London, England
- Genres: Electronic; hip hop
- Occupations: Musician; DJ; producer
- Labels: Numbers; Roya; Customs
- Member of: Swet Shop Boys
- Website: redinho.com

Tom Calvert, better known by his stage name Redinho, is an English musician, DJ, and producer from London. Calvert produced Swet Shop Boys' debut album Cashmere and Sufi LA, and performed with them on The Late Show with Stephen Colbert in New York, and directed their live performance on BBC Radio 1. Calvert was also the member of Hudson Mohawke's live band on the Lantern album campaign, and produced Riz Ahmed's 2020 album The Long Goodbye.

== Career ==
In 2010 Calvert began working with UK dance record label Numbers under the alias Redinho, releasing his beat tape Bare Blips. Under Redinho, Calvert played talkbox and synthesizer live shows, and had a 2011 Numbers release "Stay Together". Calvert toured as Redinho, playing at SXSW, Primavera, and Sónar. He also collaborated with Rustie and rapper 100s. He released the single "Searching" on Numbers in 2013. A fan at the time was Hudson Mohawke.

Calvert's full length album Redinho was released on Numbers in September 2014. Dazed called it "a debut album ... ecstatically full of life and colour." The album included vocal contributions from Brendan Reilly, Vula, and Vanessa Haynes. During 2015 and 2016, Calvert became a member of Hudson Mohawke's live band for his Lantern album campaign. During a BBC Radio 1 Maida Vale Live Session, Calvert was also interviewed by radio DJ Annie Mac through a talkbox. In 2017, under his own name, Calvert released a beat tape titled Zanbor, accompanied by a film made by Abdullah Al-wali. In early 2018, Calvert released "Square 1" featuring Kimbra. Calvert also produced "Sweet Relief" for Kimbra in 2016.

In 2018, Calvert won artist grants from the Arts Council and the PRS Foundation Momentum Fund, and was awarded the British Council's Musicians In Residence and worked in Fortaleza, Brazil.

In March 2019, Calvert released "Snake Skin Boots" featuring LA rapper Blimes on Roya. This single, as well as another single Calvert released, "Mmm Mmm" a year before in March 2018, also on Roya, were both consecutively named Annie Mac's "Hottest Record In The World" on BBC Radio 1. In August 2019, Calvert released "Nova Special" on Roya Records. The single's video was shot in Athens, Greece. In October 2019, Calvert released "Sheriff" featuring South London singer Joel Culpepper.

In March 2020, Riz Ahmed's album The Long Goodbye was released, an album produced by Calvert. The Guardian wrote that "The Long Goodbye's main currency is pointed blasts of sound, where rattling percussion and samples of traditional Indian and Pakistani instruments and singing, the latter frequently looped into insistent, hypnotic motifs, clash against bursts of harshly distorted electronics. On occasion, it slips into more commercial territory – Karma has a hint of tropical house about it, Deal With It has an impressively hooky pop melody – or something that sounds suspiciously like musical satire: Jay Sean's appearance on Any Day repurposes Drake's Auto-Tuned solipsism for socio-political ends. But its most thrilling moments are its harshest: the frantic Fast Lava, the scourging, stammering eruptions of Toba Tek Singh."

Calvert released his second notable album as Redinho, Finally We're Alone, in July 2021. The atmospheric and emotional body of work was a personal snapshot in time made during the 2020 pandemic, rooted in electronic music, beats, and 1980s VHS nostalgia, written, produced and performed by Redinho. The album was received favourably in the press, with Loud and Quiet calling it "an immensely delicate and vulnerable record" that "truthfully captures the turbulent emotions universally felt during lockdown."

== Discography ==
=== Studio albums ===
- Redinho (2014)
- Zanbor (2017) (as Tom Calvert)
- SunnyVale (2020)
- Finally We're Alone (2021)

=== EPs ===
- Bare Blips EP (2010)
- Edge Off EP (2011)

=== Singles ===
- "Stay Together" (2011)
- "Searching" (2013)
- "Square 1" (2018) (featuring Kimbra)
- "Mmm Mmm" (2018)
- "Snake Skin Boots" (2019) (with Blimes)
- "Nova Special" (2019)
- "Sheriff" (2019) (with Joel Culpepper)
- "Bullet" (2021) (featuring Sans Soucis)

=== Guest appearances ===
- 100s – "Ten Freaky Hoes" from Ivry (2014)
- Rustie – "Lost" from Green Language (2014)

=== Productions ===
- Kimbra – "Sweet Relief" (2016)
- Bonzai – "2B" and "Bodhran" from Lunacy (2016)
- Swet Shop Boys – Cashmere (2016)
- Swet Shop Boys – Sufi La (2017)
- Riz Ahmed - The Long Goodbye (2020)
- Σtella - Up and Away (2022)

=== Remixes ===
- Dorian Concept – "Clap Track 4 (Redinho Remix)" (2015)
- Fatima Yamaha – "Love Invaders (Redinho Remix)" (2016)
- Breakbot – "Get Lost (Redinho Remix)" (2016)
- Hypnolove – "Marbella (Redinho Version)" (2019)
