= Shifty (film) =

- Theatrical release poster
- Directed by: Eran Creevy
- Written by: Eran Creevy
- Produced by: Rory Aitken; Ben Pugh
- Starring: Riz Ahmed; Daniel Mays; Jason Flemyng; Nitin Ganatra; Francesca Annis
- Music by: Molly Nyman; Harry Escott; Ben Drew
- Production companies: Film London Microwave; UK Film Council; BBC Films; Between the Eyes
- Distributed by: Metrodome Distribution
- Release dates: 24 October 2008 (London Film Festival); 24 April 2009 (United Kingdom)
- Running time: 86 minutes
- Country: United Kingdom
- Language: English
- Box office: £244,579

Shifty is a 2008 British urban crime thriller film, written and directed by Eran Creevy. Set on the outskirts of London and filmed in Borehamwood, Shifty explores themes of friendship and loyalty over the course of 24 hours in the life of a young drug dealer named Shifty. The majority of the film was shot in Borehamwood, Hertfordshire, which is home to Elstree Studios. Based on Eran Creevy's own teenage experiences, the film features compelling performances from a cast of emerging talents, as well as veteran actors Jason Flemyng and Francesca Annis. Shifty was funded by Film London's Microwave scheme and completed within a shooting schedule of just 18 days.

== Plot ==
After four years, Chris returns to his hometown with the ostensible purpose of attending a party, but his true motive is to reconnect with his old friend Shifty, whom he left behind. During his time away, Chris has embraced a responsible adult life, complete with a mortgage and a good job. However, he is taken aback to discover that Shifty has been involved in cocaine dealing for quite some time, supplied by the double-dealing Glen.

Although happy to see him, Shifty has not fully forgiven Chris for leaving in the first place, and it soon transpires that the circumstances of Chris's departure are more complicated than they first seemed. They spend the next 24 hours together, Chris watching Shifty as he deals to a variety of increasingly desperate customers from the community.

Over the course of this day they are forced to confront the ghosts from the past that drove Chris away and led to the desperate and dangerous present that Shifty finds himself in, whilst re-discovering their friendship. Chris is once again given an opportunity to prove his loyalty to Shifty and ultimately to try to save Shifty from himself.

== Cast ==
- Riz Ahmed as Shifty — a local drug dealer who gets torn between street crime and what could be different
- Daniel Mays as Chris — an old friend of Shifty's who spends a day with him, but is forced to face up to why he left his hometown
- Jason Flemyng as Glen — the middle man for the drug dealers, he also supplies for Shifty
- Nitin Ganatra as Rez — Shifty's brother, who takes Shifty in when his family kicks him out, has issues with Shifty's chosen lifestyle
- Heronimo Sehmi as Ronnie – Shifty's father, who kicks him out because he does not agree with his lifestyle choices
- Francesca Annis as Valerie
- Jay Simpson as Trevor
- Dannielle Brent as Jasmine
- Kate Groombridge as Loretta
- Alice Cutter as Tasha
- Ben Drew as Drug Dealer (Uncredited)

== Soundtrack ==
Shifty Original Motion Picture Soundtrack

Soundtrack album by Molly Nyman and Harry Escott
- Released: 20 April 2009
- Recorded: 2008–2009
- Genres: Urban, Hip hop, Rap
- Length: 34:09
- Label: Silva Screen Records (SILCD1286)
- Producers: Molly Nyman and Harry Escott, Ben Drew

The soundtrack to the film was composed by Molly Nyman, and Harry Escott and performed by The Samphire Band. It was nominated for Best Technical Achievement at the British Independent Film Awards 2008. The score was performed live in the Film & Music Arena at the Latitude Festival in 2009. All tracks performed by The Samphire Band, except where stated.

=== Track listing ===
1. "Shifty Theme"
2. "Busting My Ghaand"
3. "Charming Glen"
4. "Why Am I Running?"
5. "CataclysMic" (performed by DJ Trax & Rich Beggar)
6. "Swings"
7. "Spilling the Various"
8. "Blare's House"
9. "Tough Call"
10. "Good Boy"
11. "Look At You"
12. "Night Watch"
13. "Leave it All Behind"
14. "Play the Tape"
15. "Shifty" (performed by Riz MC, Sway & Plan B)

== "Shifty" – single ==
"Shifty"

Single by Riz MC, Sway & Plan B

from the album Shifty: Original Motion Picture Soundtrack
- Released: 11 May 2009
- Recorded: 2009
- Genre: Hip hop
- Length: 3:36
- Label: True Tiger Recordings (TTR 018)
- Songwriters: Robert Conlon, Neil Thakaria, Riz Ahmed, Derek Safo, Ben Drew, Rashid El-Alami, Paul Flynn
- Producer: True Tiger

Riz MC singles chronology
"Radar" (2008)	"Shifty" (2009)	"Don't Sleep" (2009)

Sway singles chronology
"Two Fingers" (2009)	"Shifty" (2009)	"Mercedes-Benz" (2009)

Plan B singles chronology
"Pieces" (2008)	"Shifty" (2009)	"End Credits" (2009)

The official single for the film was performed by British rappers Riz MC (a.k.a. Riz Ahmed who also portrays the eponymous character in the film), Sway and Plan B. Released on 11 May 2009 on True Tiger Recordings, the single did not chart. The music video, also directed by Eran Creevy, was filmed in the same locations as the film and features Riz MC, Sway and Plan B each rapping along with footage taken from the film. Riz MC, Sway and Plan B performed the song live on 24 April 2009 at Bar Rumba, London for the film's launch party.

- Digital download and CD single
1. "Shifty" – 3:36
2. "Shifty" (Sukh Knight Remix) – 4:53
- 12" vinyl
1. "Shifty" (Sukh Knight Remix) – 4:53
2. "Shifty" (Scandalous United Remix) – 6:26
3. "Shifty" – 3:36

== Reception ==
The film has a 96% rating on Rotten Tomatoes out of 25 reviews. Many claimed that despite a very low budget, the film's actors and storyline was of the highest calibre, and therefore was a well formed, character-driven debut for Creevy. However, customers on Amazon.co.uk only gave an average review of 3.5 stars, with some claiming that the film's low budget left it with a dialogue-driven production with little or no action to add to proceedings.

== Award nominations ==
The film was nominated for British Independent Film Awards in the following categories:

- Best Achievement in Production
- Best Actor (Riz Ahmed)
- Best Supporting Actor (Daniel Mays)
- Best Technical Achievement (Harry Escott, Molly Nyman)
- Douglas Hickox Award (Eran Creevy)
- Bronze Horse (Eran Creevy)
