= Uprising (TV series) =

Documentary series presented by the BBC

Uprising is a three-part documentary series made for the BBC by Steve McQueen and James Rogan. The series is about the tragedy and aftermath of events in 1981 which it argues would go on to define race relations in the United Kingdom for a generation. In May 2022, Uprising won a television BAFTA for Factual Series.

== Episodes ==
No.	Title	Directed by	Original release date	U.K viewers (millions)
1	"Fire"	Steve McQueen & James Rogan	20 July 2021	N/A
Examines the New Cross house fire, which took the lives of 13 black teenagers in January 1981.
2	"Blame"	Steve McQueen & James Rogan	21 July 2021	N/A
Examines the day in March 1981, Black People's Day of Action, which saw more than 20,000 people join the first organised mass protest by black British people.
3	"The Front Line"	Steve McQueen & James Rogan	22 July 2021	N/A
Examines the April 1981 Brixton riot.

== Broadcast ==
The series was broadcast in the United Kingdom across three consecutive days on BBC One at 9pm from 20 July 2021.

== Home video ==
The series received a Blu-Ray release by The Criterion Collection on April 25, 2023, partnered with McQueen's Small Axe series. The release includes Uprising, the five Small Axe films, plus interviews and conversations with director Steve McQueen and cast/crew members, trailers, and an essay by Ashley Clark.

== Reception ==
The Financial Times called it a "powerful oral history of a disaster whose repercussions have echoed down to Grenfell and beyond." Uprising won the 2022 television BAFTA in the Factual Series category.
