= Molly Nyman =

British composer

Molly Nyman has composed numerous film scores. She is the elder daughter of composer Michael Nyman, and appeared in Peter Greenaway's The Falls, as did her mother, Aet Nyman. Nyman was awarded the Women's International Film & Television Showcase 2014 Sound Award in recognition of her work as a composer.

She studied music at Sussex University and went on to specialise in composition at City University, London.

== Filmography ==
- The Falls (1980) (actor only)
- We Built This City: New York (2003) (with Harry Escott)
- Hard Candy (2005) (with Harry Escott)
- What's Your Name 41? (2005)
- Die Österreichische Methode (The Austrian Method) (2006) (with Harry Escott)
- The Road to Guantanamo (2006) (with Harry Escott)
- Deep Water (2006) (with Harry Escott)
- I Am Slave (2010) (with Harry Escott)
