= Eran Creevy =

British film director

Eran Creevy is a BAFTA nominated British director most famous for his films and TV shows including Shifty (2008), Welcome to the Punch (2013), Collide (2016) and directing two episodes of the Netflix TV show The Gentlemen (2024).He also might direct King played by Shah Rukh Khan.

== Career ==
After assisting Matthew Vaughn and Woody Allen on the films Layer Cake and Scoop respectively, he began directing music videos for artists such as Asher D and Sway. It wasn't long before he directed his first commercial for Coca-Cola's energy drink, Relentless. Since then he has continued to direct music videos including "Destination Calabria" for Alex Gaudino, which went on to be one of the top five music videos in 2007. His Utah Saints promo won best dance promo at the UK Music Awards in 2008. His video for Sonny J, "Hands Free", also picked up several award nominations. His commercial credit list has grown to include further work for Relentless, Carlsberg, the Nike Plus campaign for W&K Amsterdam, the US Coastguard and commercials for the hit US television show The Chase. He wrote and directed his debut feature Shifty, which was released nationwide in cinemas in 2009. Shifty was nominated for a BAFTA, five BIFAs and named as one of Empire magazine's best films of the year. His next feature film, action thriller Welcome to the Punch, went into production in 2011 and was executive produced by Ridley Scott.

== Filmography ==
=== Films ===
Feature films

- Shifty (2008)
- Welcome to the Punch (2013)
- Collide (2016)

Other credits

- Layer Cake
- Scoop
- Breaking and Entering
- Millions
- Life and Lyrics
- Breakfast on Pluto
- Wimbledon

=== Television ===
Episodes

- The Gentlemen: "I've Hundreds of Cousins", "All Eventualities"

Music videos

- Alex Gaudino – "Destination Calabria"
- Armand Van Helden & A-Track present Duck Sauce – "Anyway"
- Eric Prydz - "Pjanoo"
- Asher D – "This Is Real"
- Natty – "Coldtown"
- Passenger – "Wicked Man's Rest"
- Riz MC, Sway & Plan B – "Shifty"
- Ronan Keating – "All Over Again"
- Sonny J – "Handsfree"
- Take That – "Kidz"
- Tim Deluxe – "Let the Beats Roll"
- Utah Saints – "Something Good '08"

Commercials

- Relentless
- Nike Sofia
- Nike Not A Runner
- US Coastguard Born Ready
- Sci Fi The Chase
- Carlsberg

== Awards and nominations ==
BAFTA Awards

- Outstanding Debut by a British Writer, Director or Producer - Shifty

British Independent Film Award (2008)

- Best Achievement in Production - Shifty
- Douglas Hickox Award (Eran Creevy)

Stockholm Film Festival (2009)

- Bronze Horse (Eran Creevy)

UK Music Video Awards

- "Something Good '08" (Best Dance Video - UK Music Video Awards 2008)
- "Handsfree" (Nominated for 3 UK Music Video Awards 2008)
