= Crushed (Ms. Marvel) =

- Ms. Marvel episode
- Promotional poster
- Episode no.: Episode 2
- Directed by: Meera Menon
- Written by: Kate Gritmon
- Cinematography by: Carmen Cabana
- Editing by: Emma McCleave; Sushila Love
- Original release date: June 15, 2022
- Running time: 51 minutes

Cast
- Samina Ahmed as Sana; Anjali Bhimani as Auntie Ruby; Matthew J. Vasquez as Miguel; Sophia Mahmud as Auntie Zara; Ishan Gandhi as Hameed; Iyad Hajjaj as Uncle Rasheed; Nandini Minocha as Auntie Humaira

Episode chronology
← Previous "Generation Why"	Next → "Destined"

"Crushed" is the second episode of the American television miniseries Ms. Marvel, based on Marvel Comics featuring the character Ms. Marvel. It follows Kamala Khan as she begins to control her powers and learn more about her family history. The episode is set in the Marvel Cinematic Universe (MCU), sharing continuity with the films of the franchise. It was written by Kate Gritmon and directed by Meera Menon.

Iman Vellani stars as Kamala Khan, alongside Matt Lintz, Yasmeen Fletcher, Zenobia Shroff, Mohan Kapur, Saagar Shaikh, Rish Shah, Laurel Marsden, Arian Moayed, Alysia Reiner, Laith Nakli, Nimra Bucha, Azhar Usman, and Travina Springer. Menon joined the series by September 2020 to direct two episodes.

"Crushed" was released on Disney+ on June 15, 2022.

== Plot ==
Kamala Khan begins training to control her powers with the help of Bruno Carrelli who deduces that the bangle activated Khan's powers, which came from within her. Dissatisfied with the male-dominated leadership of their Mosque Board, Khan's friend Nakia Bahadir decides to stand for elections. Khan, Bahadir, and Carrelli attend a party organized by Zoe Zimmer, where they meet Kamran, a new British-Pakistani senior at school. The party is cut short by the police, but Khan manages to make friends with Kamran. Carrelli becomes frustrated when Khan, infatuated with Kamran, chooses to spend time with him instead of training.

After having a vision of a mysterious woman and blacking out during a family dinner, Khan asks her grandmother Sana and Muneeba about Khan's great-grandmother Aisha, the original owner of the bangle, but both dismiss her. Yusuf says that young Sana had lost her way in the violence of the Partition of India, but was able to find her father almost mysteriously. After questioning Zimmer about her savior at AvengerCon, Department of Damage Control (DODC) agents P. Cleary and Sadie Deever order a sweep around the tri-state area, targeting South Asian communities. At the annual Eid al-Adha celebration, a young boy slips from a balcony and almost falls before Khan rescues him using her powers. She momentarily falters after having another vision of the woman. Khan is followed by DODC drones and agents led by Deever who attempt to apprehend her, but Kamran helps her escape in his car and introduces Khan to his mother, the woman in her visions.

== Production ==
=== Development ===
By August 2019, Marvel Studios had begun development on a Ms. Marvel television series for the streaming service Disney+. In September 2020, Meera Menon was hired to direct one episode, ultimately directing two episodes, including the second. Executive producers include Marvel Studios' Kevin Feige, Louis D'Esposito, Victoria Alonso, and Brad Winderbaum, in addition to Kamala Khan co-creator Sana Amanat, lead directors Adil & Bilall, and head writer Bisha K. Ali. The second episode, titled "Crushed", was written by Kate Gritmon.

=== Writing ===
The episode features scenes directly referencing moments from early Ms. Marvel comics, including when Khan drinks orange juice with alcohol at a party, and Khan and Nakia Bahadir unable to hear Sheikh Abdullah at their mosque. Yasmeen Fletcher called Bahadir's monologue in the episode about her decision to wear a hijab "extremely gratifying" as she had not heard "the mixed experience" discussed in that way in media before because it always felt like "a niche topic".

=== Casting ===
The episode stars Iman Vellani as Kamala Khan, Matt Lintz as Bruno Carrelli, Yasmeen Fletcher as Nakia Bahadir, Zenobia Shroff as Muneeba Khan, Mohan Kapur as Yusuf Khan, Saagar Shaikh as Aamir Khan, Rish Shah as Kamran, Laurel Marsden as Zoe Zimmer, Arian Moayed as P. Cleary, Alysia Reiner as Sadie Deever, Laith Nakli as Sheikh Abdullah, Nimra Bucha as Najma, Azhar Usman as Najaf, and Travina Springer as Tyesha Hillman. Also starring are Samina Ahmed as Sana, Anjali Bhimani as Auntie Ruby, Matthew J. Vasquez as Miguel, Sophia Mahmud as Auntie Zara, Ishan Gandhi as Hameed, Iyad Hajjaj as Uncle Rasheed, and Nandini Minocha as Auntie Humaira. Adil & Bilall make cameo appearances as a man in the mosque and one of the "Mosque Bros", respectively.

=== Design ===
External videos
- Marvel Studios' Ms. Marvel: End Credits Main On End Title Sequence Episode 2 presents the episode's main-on-end title sequence, YouTube video from Perception's channel

The series' main-on-end title sequence was designed by Perception who filmed the sequence in Jersey City to pay homage to Khan's character, while also designing the murals themselves. The inspiration for the design is to show Jersey City from Khan's point of view while "celebrating the comic books and their artwork that this series is based on".

=== Filming and visual effects ===
Filming took place at Trilith Studios, Blackhall Studios, and Areu Brothers Studios, with Menon directing the episode, and Carmen Cabana serving as cinematographer. Establishing shots were also filmed in New Jersey.

Menon spoke about continuing on from first episode directors Adil and Bilall, saying aspects such as the animation and camera movements were retained, while her and Cabana were able to put their own "visual language" around Khan's imagination, and create things that were unique to this episode, such as the "longer scenes, deeper backstories and darker moments between Kamala and her confrontation with the source of where this power is coming from". Menon called Khan's training montage of her learning how to use her powers as "a constant work in progress", noting it keep changing through all parts of production as they were trying different things. She felt this was "really reflective of the way Kamala approaches her powers in the story". A lot of footage was shot for this sequence, with the hope that the edit could "find the most concise way" to show her "[realizing] that she can shape the light into platforms she can jump on". Kamala saving the young boy at the mosque was meant to be "a bit more improvised and more jagged and definitely more flawed of an attempt at a superhero save".

Visual effects for the episode were created by Method Studios, Framestore London and Montreal, Trixter, RISE, Folks VFX, Monsters Aliens Robots Zombies, Base FX, SSVFX, Stereo D, Cantina Creative, Instinctual, Digital Domain, FuseFX, and Moving Picture Company.

=== Music ===
The following songs were included in the episode: "Feel So Good" by Mase, "Goddess" by Krewella, Nervo, and Raja Kumari, "Come Around" by Timbaland and M.I.A., "Keep on Movin" by B. Stew, "Anthem" by Swet Shop Boys, "Sage" by Ritviz, "Attitude" by PayAttention, "Peechay Hutt" by Hassan Raheem, Justin Bibis, and Talal Qureshi, "Jalebi Baby" by Tesher, "Be My Baby" by the Ronettes, "Aye Khuda" by Aslam Afzal, Farhad B, Vimal K, and Atif Afzal, and "Husan" by Husan & Bhangra Knights.

== Marketing ==
A QR code was included in the episode that allowed viewers to access a free digital copy of Ms. Marvel's debut solo series, Ms. Marvel (2014) #15, which was the first appearance of Kamran. After the episode's release, Marvel announced merchandise inspired by the episode as part of its weekly "Marvel Must Haves" promotion for each episode of the series, including AvengerCon Kamala Khan and Bruno Funko Pops, apparel, and accessories.

== Release ==
"Crushed" was released on Disney+ on June 15, 2022. It was released in Pakistan as part of a special theatrical release through licenser HKC Entertainment, due to Disney+ not being available in the country at that time, on June 16, 2022 along with the first episode. The episode aired on ABC as part of The Wonderful World of Disney, along with the first and third episodes, on August 5, 2023.

== Reception ==
=== Viewership ===
According to market research company Parrot Analytics, which looks at consumer engagement in consumer research, streaming, downloads, and on social media, Ms. Marvel saw a 17% increase in demand after its second episode aired on June 15. The series ranked as the fifth most in-demand breakout show from June 11 to June 17, 2022, which is defined as the most in-demand series that have premiered in the past 100 days, up from ninth place last week, and had 20.1 times more demand than the average show in the U.S. during this period. The streaming aggregator Reelgood, which monitors real-time data from 5 million users in the U.S. for original and acquired streaming programs and movies across subscription video-on-demand (SVOD) and ad-supported video-on-demand (AVOD) services, reported that Ms. Marvel was the third most-watched series for the week ending June 18, 2022. Whip Media, which tracks viewership data for the more than 21 million worldwide users of its TV Time app, calculated that Ms. Marvel was the fourth most-streamed original series for the week ending June 19, 2022.

=== Critical response ===
The review aggregator website Rotten Tomatoes reports a 97% approval rating with an average rating of 8.00/10, based on 89 reviews. The site's critical consensus reads, "The adventures of Kamala Khan achieve a charming verisimilitude in this sophomore installment, which smartly considers the challenges of fitting outsized powers into the box of parental expectations."

Ariba Bhuvad of Winter Is Coming gave "Crushed" an "A" and praised the episode for exploring the mystery of Kamala Khan's powers while effectively capturing the emotional ups and downs of teenage life. She complimented the show's authentic portrayal of cultural experiences, particularly in a mosque scene, and valued a significant conversation about the complications of wearing a hijab. Bhuvad found the exploration of Khan's ancestral connection to her powers intriguing, which added depth to the storyline. Kirsten Howard of Den of Geek rated the episode four out of five stars, praising its engaging exploration of Kamala Khan's character and powers. She highlighted the show's fresh take on Khan's comic origins and complimented the intriguing dynamics introduced, particularly her struggle with newly awakened powers tied to her family's history and the Partition. Howard noted that the episode's tone was more relaxed than the premiere, allowing for deeper character development. She expressed anticipation for future episodes to further explore Khan's powers and background.

Discussing the incorporation of the Partition of India into Khan's origin story, Usama Masood at Collider said, "For the MCU to dive into the turbulent time of the subcontinent is surprising given Marvel's penchant for staying out of anything remotely complex. Yet the series has tweaked Kamala's generic Inhuman transformation arc and made her out to be something more, tying her powers and therefore strengths explicitly with her culture and background." Masood added that the series has portrayed the history and culture of Islamic and Pakistani culture with "great accuracy."
