= No Normal =

- Ms. Marvel episode
- Promotional poster for the series
- Episode no.: Episode 6
- Directed by: Adil & Bilall
- Story by: Will Dunn
- Teleplay by: Will Dunn; A. C. Bradley; Matthew Chauncey
- Cinematography by: Robrecht Heyvaert
- Editing by: Nona Khodai; Sabrina Plisco
- Original release date: July 13, 2022
- Running time: 49 minutes

Cast
- Jordan Firstman as Gabe Wilson; Anjali Bhimani as auntie Ruby; Sophia Mahmud as auntie Zara; Nic Starr as Mr. Hillman; Tonia Jackson as Mrs. Hillman; Matthew J. Vasquez as Miguel; Iyad Hajjaj as Uncle Rasheed; Ishan Gandhi as Hameed; Paul Kim as Paul; Jesse James Locorriere as Richardson; Ethan McDowell as Agent Barrie; G. Willow Wilson as herself

Episode chronology
← Previous "Time and Again"	Next → —

"No Normal" is the sixth episode and series finale of the American television miniseries Ms. Marvel, based on Marvel Comics featuring the character Ms. Marvel. It follows Kamala Khan as she works together with her friends Bruno Carrelli and Nakia Bahadir to help Kamran escape from the Department of Damage Control and become the superhero "Ms. Marvel". The episode is set in the Marvel Cinematic Universe (MCU), sharing continuity with the films of the franchise. It was written by Will Dunn, A. C. Bradley, and Matthew Chauncey, with a story by Dunn. The episode was directed by Adil & Bilall.

Iman Vellani stars as Kamala Khan / Ms. Marvel, alongside Matt Lintz, Yasmeen Fletcher, Zenobia Shroff, Mohan Kapur, Saagar Shaikh, Rish Shah, Laurel Marsden, Arian Moayed, Alysia Reiner, Laith Nakli, Azhar Usman, Travina Springer, and Aramis Knight. El Arbi and Fallah joined the series by September 2020 to direct two episodes.

"No Normal" was released on Disney+ on July 13, 2022.

== Plot ==
While Bruno Carrelli and Kamran, who is struggling to control his new powers, are on the run, Department of Damage Control (DODC) agent Sadie Deever orders the lockdown of Jersey City and wants to find Kamran alive. Meanwhile, Kamala's family are accepting and supportive of her new powers. Nakia Bahadir informs Kamala of Bruno's situation, whereupon Kamala puts together her disguise with a gift from her mother Muneeba and the Red Daggers member Kareem's cloth. Upon finding Bruno and Kamran, Kamala asks Kareem for help. Kareem tells her to get Kamran to the docks by midnight so his Red Dagger contacts can sneak him out of the country. They also get support from Nakia, Kamala's brother Aamir, and Zoe Zimmer and devise a plan to stall the DODC agents.

Although fellow DODC agent P. Cleary tells them to retreat, Deever ignores the order and has the high school, where Kamala and her friends are hiding, stormed. Zoe posts a video on social media in which she begs for help, prompting the entire community to gather at the school and demand that DODC leave the teens alone. Despite the group's efforts, the DODC arrests everyone except Kamala and Kamran, who then learns of his mother's death and confronts Deever. When she fires at him, Kamala protects him, using her powers to fight off the agents. Overwhelmed by his grief and his new powers, Kamran goes on a rampage until Kamala talks him down, allowing him to escape to the docks. The community shields Khan from the DODC, enabling her to also flee. With public opinion mounting against the agency, Deever is discharged by Cleary for her disobedience.

Kamala becomes a beloved figure in the community and takes the superhero name "Ms. Marvel" through her father Yusuf. Kamran reaches Pakistan, where he is taken in by Kareem. A week later, while preparing to leave for Caltech, Bruno explains to Kamala that he examined the family DNA to see if Aamir may also have powers, and reveals his discovery that she is different from her family and has a mutation in her genes. (Note: It is implied that Khan is a mutant, with Vellani later stating she was the first mutant in the MCU.)

In a mid-credits scene, Kamala and her idol Carol Danvers swap places after the former's bangle emits a strange glow. (Note: As depicted in The Marvels (2023).)

== Production ==
=== Development ===
By August 2019, Marvel Studios had begun development on a Ms. Marvel television series for the streaming service Disney+. In September 2020, Adil El Arbi and Bilall Fallah were hired to direct two episodes of the series, including the sixth. Executive producers include Marvel Studios' Kevin Feige, Louis D'Esposito, Victoria Alonso, and Brad Winderbaum, in addition to Kamala Khan co-creator Sana Amanat, El Arbi, Fallah, and head writer Bisha K. Ali. The sixth episode, titled "No Normal", was written by Will Dunn, A. C. Bradley, and Matthew Chauncey, with a story by Dunn. The title is a reference to the character's first comic book story arc.

=== Writing ===
"No Normal" features Kamala Khan using her comic book counterpart's catchphrase, embiggen, which forms hard light around her body as a large armor, resembling her polymorph powers from the comics; this implementation was suggested by visual effects supervisor Nordin Rahhali, with El Arbi believing this was a good "blend" between what was scripted and paying homage to the comics. Fallah explained at this point in the episode, Khan is at the end of her energy, and then seeing her family, which he said was "where she gets her power", says "embiggen", becoming Ms. Marvel and the "full version of herself" in that moment. Ali echoed this, noting how the entire series had been building to where "she could discover who she is on the inside so she could 'embiggen', essentially". The episode also explains how she gets her Ms. Marvel name, with her father explaining how "Kamal" means "perfect" in Arabic, but more like "marvel" in Urdu.

The episode also reveals that Kamala Khan has a genetic "mutation", which implied she was a mutant through the use of a musical excerpt of the X-Men: The Animated Series (1992-1997) theme. Star Iman Vellani confirmed Khan was the first mutant in the MCU, despite other creatives being more reserved in what the line and musical excerpt meant. Ali said giving Khan this backstory, which helped explain how the other members of her family would not have powers if they used the bangle and made her special, "fit into the logic of the wider MCU". This differentiates the character from the comics, in which she is an Inhuman. Amanat revealed that discussions about making Khan a mutant had occurred "for some time" and that when she was helping to develop the character for the comics, she was originally planned to be a mutant. Vellani added about not following the Inhuman path from the comics, saying the MCU is "in a very different place than the comics were", believing some aspects of the character needed to be reimagined for live action while staying true to her "core themes and the tone" from the comics. The mutation reveal was kept from the script and actors, including Matt Lintz, who says the line, until late in the process. Vellani "freaked out" at the reveal, calling it "the biggest deal in the world", which made it difficult to capture the line during filming, because she and Lintz kept laughing. Lintz added that he was also excited by the reveal, and anticipated the viewers would be as well.

There had been early discussions to have Carol Danvers / Captain Marvel appear earlier in the season. However, Ali realized such an appearance would have taken away from Khan's journey to come into her own and appreciate her community. To highlight this, Ali said the end of the episode of Khan looking at herself in the mirror, she sees herself, wearing a suit made by her friends and family, rather than someone imitating Captain Marvel, as was done in a similar scene in the first episode.

=== Casting ===
The episode stars Iman Vellani as Kamala Khan / Ms. Marvel, Matt Lintz as Bruno Carrelli, Yasmeen Fletcher as Nakia Bahadir, Zenobia Shroff as Muneeba Khan, Mohan Kapur as Yusuf Khan, Saagar Shaikh as Aamir Khan, Rish Shah as Kamran, Laurel Marsden as Zoe Zimmer, Arian Moayed as P. Cleary, Alysia Reiner as Sadie Deever, Laith Nakli as Sheikh Abdullah, Azhar Usman as Najaf, Travina Springer as Tyesha Hillman, and Aramis Knight as Kareem / Red Dagger. Also appearing are Jordan Firstman as Gabe Wilson, Anjali Bhimani as auntie Ruby, Sophia Mahmud as auntie Zara, Nic Starr as Mr. Hillman, Tonia Jackson as Mrs. Hillman, Matthew J. Vasquez as Miguel, Iyad Hajjaj as Uncle Rasheed, Ishan Gandhi as Hameed, Paul Kim as Paul, Jesse James Locorriere as Richardson, Ethan McDowell as Agent Barrie, and Kamala Khan co-creator G. Willow Wilson as herself. Brie Larson has an uncredited cameo appearance as Carol Danvers / Captain Marvel.

=== Design ===
External videos
- Marvel Studios' Ms. Marvel: End Credits Main On End Title Sequence Episode 6 presents the episode's main-on-end title sequence, YouTube video from Perception's channel

The series' main-on-end title sequence was designed by Perception who combined the footage from Jersey City and Karachi, "bouncing between the two cities". The location swapping represented the "blend and balance" of Khan's character while also showcasing the various murals, color changes, and patterns that were used in both cities.

=== Filming and visual effects ===
Filming took place at Trilith Studios, Blackhall Studios, and Areu Brothers Studios, with El Arbi and Fallah directing the episode, and Robrecht Heyvaert serving as cinematographer. Establishing shots were also filmed in New Jersey. The mid-credits scene featuring Larson's cameo appearance was shot by The Marvels (2023) director Nia DaCosta.

Visual effects for the episode were created by Digital Domain, Method Studios, RISE, Stereo D, Base FX, SSVFX, Framestore London, OD Studios, Folks VFX, Instinctual, Moving Picture Company, Cantina Creative, and Trixter. The ending shot of Khan on a lamppost was entirely digitally created by Digital Domain.

=== Music ===
The following songs were featured in the episode: "CPT. Space" by Janoobi Khargosh, "Blowin' Out Speakers" by Tom Griffiths, Adam Zapel, Dayeaux, and Alex Nova, "Lightswitch" by Chaii, "Ko Ko Koreena" by Ahmed Rushdi, "Anthem" by Swet Shop Boys, "Indian Summer" by Jai Wolf, "Aavegi" by Ritviz, and "Hadippa" by Pritam and DJ Hot Americano. An excerpt of the main theme from X-Men '97 (2024-present) by the Newton Brothers, which is an updated version of the main theme from X-Men: The Animated Series composed by Ron Wasserman, is heard when Kamala's mutation is referenced. For legal reasons, the theme is credited to The Animated Series music executives Haim Saban and Shuki Levy.

== Marketing ==
A QR code was included in the episode that allowed viewers to access a free digital copy of Ms. Marvel (2014) #19. After the episode's release, Marvel announced merchandise inspired by the episode as part of its weekly "Marvel Must Haves" promotion for each episode of the series, including apparel, accessories, Funko Pops of Aisha, Kamran, and Ms. Marvel, and the Ms. Marvel: Beyond the Limit trade paperback.

== Release ==
"No Normal" was released on Disney+ on July 13, 2022. It featured a content warning at the beginning of the episode due to the similarities between scenes depicting law enforcement entering a school building and the Robb Elementary School shooting. It was released in Pakistan as part of a special theatrical release through licenser HKC Entertainment, due to Disney+ not being available in the country at that time, on July 14, 2022 along with the fifth episode. The episode was digitally altered by January 2023 to update the design of the Statue of Liberty to match its deoxidized appearance following the events of Spider-Man: No Way Home (2021). The episode aired on ABC as part of The Wonderful World of Disney, along with the fourth and fifth episodes, on August 12, 2023.

== Reception ==
=== Viewership ===
According to market research company Parrot Analytics, which looks at consumer engagement in consumer research, streaming, downloads, and on social media, Ms. Marvel ranked as the ninth most in-demand digital original series in Canada during the week of July 11–17. The series achieved a demand average of 17.99 times more than the average TV show in the country. It was also the most in-demand breakout show from July 16–22, which is defined as the most in-demand series that have premiered in the past 100 days, achieving 27 times the average series demand in the United States.

Nielsen Media Research, which records streaming viewership on U.S. television screens, calculated that Ms. Marvel was the seventh-most watched original series across streaming services for the week of July 11–17 with a series high 357 million minutes watched. It was a 21% increase from the previous week. Whip Media, which tracks viewership data for the more than 21 million worldwide users of its TV Time app, announced that Ms. Marvel was the second most-streamed original series in the U.S. for the week ending July 17, 2022.

=== Critical response ===
The review aggregator website Rotten Tomatoes reports a 95% approval rating with an average rating of 8.10/10, based on 19 reviews.

Swara Salih at Gizmodo said, "while a decent finale for a good series, the episode encapsulates the issues of the show overall", wishing it highlighted more of Khan's self-discovery and acceptance as in the comics. He called the embiggening powers "a cool looking effect", and was glad the series did not make Kamran the villain, instead "playing with the idea of him being the 'radical' and her being the 'reasonable' one". He also thought it was "ironic" that implying Khan was a mutant instead of Inhuman or Kree "may have distanced her background even more" from Captain Marvel and Monica Rambeau's. Ryan Parker of The Hollywood Reporter called Larson's cameo "incredibly satisfying because it did not undercut the series", adding had Danvers "arrived too soon to save the day, it could be argued the cameo would have undercut what the entire series set up prior".
