= Destined (Ms. Marvel) =

- Ms. Marvel episode
- Promotional poster
- Episode no.: Episode 3
- Directed by: Meera Menon
- Story by: Freddy Syborn
- Teleplay by: Freddy Syborn; A. C. Bradley; Matthew Chauncey
- Cinematography by: Carmen Cabana
- Editing by: Emma McCleave; Sushila Love; Sabrina Plisco
- Original release date: June 22, 2022
- Running time: 47 minutes

Cast
- Samina Ahmed as Sana; Ali Alsaleh as Aadam; Dan Carter as Saleem; Anjali Bhimani as Auntie Ruby; Sophia Mahmud as Auntie Zara; Jordan Preston Carter as Gabe; Nic Starr as Mr. Hillman; Tonia Jackson as Mrs. Hillman

Episode chronology
← Previous "Crushed"	Next → "Seeing Red"

"Destined" is the third episode of the American television miniseries Ms. Marvel, based on Marvel Comics featuring the character Ms. Marvel. It follows Kamala Khan as she learns of the Clandestines. The episode is set in the Marvel Cinematic Universe (MCU), sharing continuity with the films of the franchise. It was written by Freddy Syborn, A. C. Bradley, and Matthew Chauncey, from a story by Syborn. The episode was directed by Meera Menon.

Iman Vellani stars as Kamala Khan, alongside Matt Lintz, Yasmeen Fletcher, Zenobia Shroff, Mohan Kapur, Saagar Shaikh, Rish Shah, Adaku Ononogbo, Alysia Reiner, Laith Nakli, Nimra Bucha, and Travina Springer. Menon joined the series by September 2020 to direct two episodes.

"Destined" was released on Disney+ on June 22, 2022.

== Plot ==
Najma explains that she and Kamran are part of a group of enhanced beings known as Clandestines or Djinn who were exiled from the Noor dimension, and that Aisha was one of them. She also reveals that the bangle might be able to help them return, and asks for Kamala Khan's help. Kamala agrees, but Bruno Carrelli warns her that interdimensional travel could be dangerous, so she asks Kamran for more time to ensure that they can do it safely. Kamran assents, but Najma refuses to wait and decides to force Kamala to help them. Kamala's brother Aamir marries his fiancée Tyesha, but Kamran arrives at the wedding to warn Kamala before the other Clandestines arrive. Kamala, Bruno, and Kamran are overpowered by the Clandestines while Najma tries to use the bangle, which triggers a vision of a train. The Department of Damage Control (DODC) agents arrive and capture the Clandestines, including Kamran. As Kamala and Bruno escape, Nakia Bahadir sees Kamala using her powers. Sana contacts Kamala, revealing that she also saw the vision of the train and insisting that Kamala and Muneeba must visit her in Karachi.

== Production ==
=== Development ===
By August 2019, Marvel Studios had begun development on a Ms. Marvel television series for the streaming service Disney+. In September 2020, Meera Menon was hired to direct one episode, ultimately directing two episodes, including the third. Executive producers include Marvel Studios' Kevin Feige, Louis D'Esposito, Victoria Alonso, and Brad Winderbaum, in addition to Kamala Khan co-creator Sana Amanat, lead directors Adil El Arbi and Bilall Fallah, and head writer Bisha K. Ali. The third episode, titled "Destined", had the teleplay written by Freddy Syborn, A. C. Bradley, and Matthew Chauncey, and the story was written by Syborn.

=== Writing ===
The episodes introduces the antagonists of the series, the Clandestines, Djinns trying return to their home Noor dimension after being exiled on Earth. This group shares the name of an "obscure family of enhanced people" from the comics, the ClanDestine. Marco Vito Oddo at Collider felt changing the group's origins to be from another dimension and connecting them to Pakistani culture and folklore allowed the series to "honor the cultural heritage" of the Khans and connecting Djinns to "create a mystical heritage for Kamala is also a clever solution to pay homage" to her comics origin story.

=== Casting ===
The episode stars Iman Vellani as Kamala Khan, Matt Lintz as Bruno Carrelli, Yasmeen Fletcher as Nakia Bahadir, Zenobia Shroff as Muneeba Khan, Mohan Kapur as Yusuf Khan, Saagar Shaikh as Aamir Khan, Rish Shah as Kamran, Adaku Ononogbo as Fariha, Alysia Reiner as Sadie Deever, Laith Nakli as Sheikh Abdullah, Nimra Bucha as Najma, and Travina Springer as Tyesha Hillman. Also starring are Samina Ahmed as Sana, Ali Alsaleh as Aadam, Dan Carter as Saleem, Anjali Bhimani as Auntie Ruby, Sophia Mahmud as Auntie Zara, Jordan Preston Carter as Gabe, and Nic Starr and Tonia Jackson as Mr. and Mrs. Hillman. Mehwish Hayat appears, uncredited, as Aisha. Amanat has a cameo appearance as a guest at Aamir and Tyesha's wedding.

=== Design ===
External videos
- Marvel Studios' Ms. Marvel: End Credits Main On End Title Sequence Episode 3 presents the episode's main-on-end title sequence, YouTube video from Perception's channel

Natasha Gerasimova, production designer for the reshoots, called the opening cave set the "hardest one" to design for during the reshoots because there was no real-world equivalent to draw from since it was a "completely invented space". She tried to make it look like a real cave, and it was conceived and built in four weeks, the fastest she had ever designed and built a set. The set was built from foam, and also included the markings of the Ten Rings. The series' main-on-end title sequence was designed by Perception who filmed the sequence in Jersey City to pay homage to Khan's character, while also designing the murals themselves. The inspiration for the design is to show Jersey City from Khan's point of view while "celebrating the comic books and their artwork that this series is based on".

=== Filming and visual effects ===
Filming took place at Trilith Studios, Blackhall Studios, and Areu Brothers Studios, with Menon directing the episode, and Carmen Cabana serving as cinematographer. Establishing shots were also filmed in New Jersey.

The opening flashback scene in the cave where Aisha and the other Clandestines find the bangle was filmed during the series reshoots in Atlanta. The dance team BFunk was brought in to choreograph the Bollywood dance number at Aamir and Tyesha's wedding to create an authenticity to it, while making it "be fun and look good, but [not] too good". The cast was excited to learn and perform the dance number, with Fletcher noting it felt like a real wedding. Lintz, who noted he was not much of a dancer, felt his lack of skills was "in line" with Bruno's character for his solo dance. Menon added that they wanted to "lean into the personalities of all the characters and make sure that they seem like real people that are trying to dance". Shaikh added that it was "typical" in Pakistani weddings for the bride to be unaware of the groom joining in the dance, even though "it happens every time", which happens in the episode with Tyesha unaware Aamir would be dancing. Menon said the creatives wanted a song that was "kind of old school for the parents to dance to" to then transition to an "upbeat and Bhangra-infused for the younger folks to dance to", noting finding the right two songs for the sequence proved challenging.

For Kamala's fight sequence at the wedding, various other Bon Jovi songs were considered before settling on "Livin' on a Prayer". Menon believed the story in "Livin' on a Prayer" of "two scrappy kids from New Jersey trying to survive under what feels like impossible odds" made it the perfect song to represent Kamala. This fight was meant to represent Kamala becoming a more complete hero, with more control over her powers, compared to the "more improvised" save of the boy at the mosque in the previous episode.

Visual effects for the episode were created by Digital Domain, Method Studios, FuseFX, Folks VFX, Framestore London, Trixter, SSVFX, Base FX, Moving Picture Company, Stereo D, Cantina Creative, Instinctual, Monsters Aliens Robots Zombies, and RISE.

=== Music ===
The following songs were included in the episode: "Sink", "Joote De Do Paise Le Lo" by Lata Mangeshkar and S. P. Balasubrahmanyam, "Mehendi Rachnewali" by Sidhant Kapoor, "Hadippa" by Pritam & DJ Hot Americano, "What's the Difference" by Blackhand, "Tere Bina - Khanvict Remix" by A. R. Rahman, Khanvict, Chinmayi, Murtuza Khan, and Qadir Khan, "Yeh Mera Dil Yaar Ka Diwana" by Asha Bhosle, "Closer" by Khanvict, "Thandi Hawa" by Ritviz, "Bed of Roses" by Bon Jovi, "Livin' on a Prayer" by Bon Jovi, and "For Aisha" by MEMBA feat. EVAN GIIA & Nooran Sisters.

== Marketing ==
A QR code was included in the episode that allowed viewers to access a free digital copy of Magnificent Ms. Marvel (2019) #1. After the episode's release, Marvel announced merchandise inspired by the episode as part of its weekly "Marvel Must Haves" promotion for each episode of the series, including a Najma Funko Pop, apparel, and accessories.

== Release ==
"Destined" was released on Disney+ on June 22, 2022. It was released in Pakistan as part of a special theatrical release through licenser HKC Entertainment, due to Disney+ not being available in the country at that time, on June 30, 2022, along with the fourth episode. The episode aired on ABC as part of The Wonderful World of Disney, along with the first and second episodes, on August 5, 2023.

== Reception ==
=== Viewership ===
According to market research company Parrot Analytics, which looks at consumer engagement in consumer research, streaming, downloads, and on social media, Ms. Marvel fell to sixth place in the rankings of breakout shows, which are defined as the most in-demand series that have premiered in the past 100 days, during the week of June 18 to June 24, 2022, despite experiencing an 11% increase in demand. The shift in position was attributed to The Old Man rising significantly in the rankings. During this week, Ms. Marvel maintained a demand level of 18.6 times the average series in the United States. Whip Media, which tracks viewership data for the more than 21 million worldwide users of its TV Time app, calculated that Ms. Marvel was the fifth most-streamed original series for the week ending June 26, 2022.

=== Critical response ===
The review aggregator website Rotten Tomatoes reports a 100% approval rating with an average rating of 7.80/10, based on 22 reviews. The site's critical consensus reads, "Iman Vellani keeps affirming that she was 'destined' to play a superhero in another jaunty installment that lays out Ms. Marvel's mythos without sacrificing any of the fast-paced fun."

Kirsten Howard of Den of Geek rated "Destined" four out of five stars and praised the episode for its character-driven storytelling and its exploration of Khan's family history and powers. Howard highlighted the episode's balance between character development and action, noting the emotional depth it added to Khan's relationships with her friends and family. She also found the revelation about the Djinn and Khan's great-grandmother to be intriguing, and complimented the series' slower, more deliberate pacing compared to typical MCU entries. Sarah Shaffi of The A.V. Club gave the episode a B+ grade and praised the series for delivering action while continuing to explore deeper themes, particularly the concept of "What, exactly, is home?" She appreciated how the focus on Khan's brother's wedding reflected the way immigrant communities use celebrations to reconnect with their heritage. Shaffi also highlighted the introduction of the Djinn as a fresh take on Khan's powers, linking them to Islamic mythology and her cultural background. Emma Fraser of IGN awarded the episode eight ouf of ten and highlighted the show's ability to balance superhero action with rich cultural storytelling, placing Khan's family and Muslim faith at the core of her journey. She noted that the episode is filled with revelations about Khan's powers and heritage, but it is the family dynamics and cultural details that truly stand out. Fraser praised the wedding dance sequence, while acknowledging that the fast-paced plot sometimes feels burdened by exposition. She also complimented the series' handling of real-world themes, such as Muslim representation and the defiance of the Department of Damage Control, calling the series refreshing and resonant despite occasional pacing issues.
