= Generation Why (Ms. Marvel) =

- Ms. Marvel episode
- Promotional poster
- Episode no.: Episode 1
- Directed by: Adil & Bilall
- Written by: Bisha K. Ali
- Cinematography by: Robrecht Heyvaert
- Editing by: Nona Khodai; Sabrina Plisco
- Original release date: June 8, 2022
- Running time: 49 minutes

Cast
- Arian Moayed as Agent Cleary; Alysia Reiner as Agent Deever; Jordan Firstman as Gabe Wilson; Anjali Bhimani as Auntie Ruby; Sophia Mahmud as Auntie Zara

Episode chronology
← Previous —	Next → "Crushed"

"Generation Why" is the first episode of the American television miniseries Ms. Marvel, based on Marvel Comics featuring the character Ms. Marvel. It follows Kamala Khan, a fangirl of the Avengers, particularly Carol Danvers / Captain Marvel, as she tries to attend AvengerCon, only to gain her own powers. The episode is set in the Marvel Cinematic Universe (MCU), sharing continuity with the films of the franchise. It was written by head writer Bisha K. Ali and directed by Adil & Bilall (Adil El Arbi and Bilall Fallah).

Iman Vellani stars as Kamala Khan, alongside Matt Lintz, Yasmeen Fletcher, Zenobia Shroff, Mohan Kapur, Saagar Shaikh, Laurel Marsden, and Azhar Usman. Ali was hired to write the episode and serve as head writer for the series by August 2019. El Arbi and Fallah joined the series by September 2020 to direct two episodes.

"Generation Why" was released on Disney+ on June 8, 2022. The episode was praised by critics, highlighting the unique visuals and Vellani's performance.

== Plot ==
Kamala Khan is a 16-year-old high school teenager from Jersey City, New Jersey, and a fangirl of the Avengers, particularly Carol Danvers / Captain Marvel. After failing her driving test, Khan creates a plan with her best friend Bruno Carrelli to attend the "AvengerCon" fan convention at Camp Lehigh while avoiding Khan's parents' strict rules. Khan receives a package from her grandmother of objects her mother sees as junk, but Khan is enthralled by one of the objects, a golden bangle. She takes the bangle to the convention, intending to use it as part of her Captain Marvel cosplay. As she prepares to get on stage, Khan puts the bangle on, which grants her the ability to shoot energy constructs, that end up causing havoc at the convention. Carrelli rushes Khan home, where she is lectured by her mother.

In a mid-credits scene, Department of Damage Control agents P. Cleary and Sadie Deever watch a video of Khan's incident at AvengerCon.

== Production ==
=== Development ===
By August 2019, Marvel Studios had begun development on a Ms. Marvel television series for the streaming service Disney+, with Bisha K. Ali hired to serve as the head writer. In September 2020, Adil El Arbi and Bilall Fallah were hired to direct two episodes of the series, including the first episode. Executive producers include Marvel Studios' Kevin Feige, Louis D'Esposito, Victoria Alonso, and Brad Winderbaum, in addition to Kamala Khan co-creator Sana Amanat, El Arbi, Fallah, and Ali. The first episode, titled "Generation Why", was written by Ali.

=== Writing ===
Ali described the episode as about "being a fan and being able to speak to fans and connect to them". The episode explains how people within the Marvel Cinematic Universe (MCU) are aware of the events of Avengers: Endgame (2019), by revealing that Ant-Man / Scott Lang has been giving podcast interviews detailing the battle. Determining this was how people were aware took many iterations and discussions with the creatives, with other ideas being that the world was posting about it on social media, and a very early suggesting from Ali that drones were near by to live stream the battle. Ali was open to creating these fictional podcasts with Lang actor Paul Rudd. Ali called the AvengerCon scene in the first draft of the script "bananas" with "everybody in it", including a person cosplaying as Korg who could not get through security, and a Pegasus that Valkyrie rides so they could have "represent[ed] everybody in the show".

=== Casting ===
The episode stars Iman Vellani as Kamala Khan, Matt Lintz as Bruno Carrelli, Yasmeen Fletcher as Nakia Bahadir, Zenobia Shroff as Muneeba Khan, Mohan Kapur as Yusuf Khan, Saagar Shaikh as Aamir Khan, Laurel Marsden as Zoe Zimmer, and Azhar Usman as Najaf. Also starring are Arian Moayed as agent Cleary, Alysia Reiner as agent Deever, Jordan Firstman as Gabe Wilson, Anjali Bhimani as auntie Ruby, and Sophia Mahmud as auntie Zara. Ryan Penagos, vice president and creative executive at Marvel New Media, has a cameo appearance as the cosplay competition host at AvengerCon. Shaikh and fellow series star Rish Shah appeared in the background at AvengerCon dressed as Iron Man and Captain America, respectively, since both were so impressed with the set and wanted to be a part of it. Many of the extras were fans of the MCU and real-life cosplayers.

=== Design ===
External videos
- Marvel Studios' Ms. Marvel: End Credits Main On End Title Sequence Episode 1 presents the episode's main-on-end title sequence, YouTube video from Perception's channel

Khan's high school featured a plaque with the names of all of her comic book creators, including writer G. Willow Wilson, editor Stephen Wacker, artists Adrian Alphona, Jamie McKelvie, and Takeshi Miyazawa, colorist Ian Herring, penciler Nico Leon, and letterer Joe Caramagna. El Arbi called the AvengerCon set a "homage to the fans" and "an Easter egg paradise". The directors researched real-life comic cons to help inspire the various costumes and cosplays worn by the attendees. The creators had to imagine what regular people in the MCU would know about the Avengers and the other heroes of the world, which resulted in design choices such as referring to Groot as "Mr. Tree". Amanat explained, "Nobody knows that Groot's name is Groot... People [of the MCU] might know some things, but they don't know all the things." The series' main-on-end title sequence was designed by Perception who filmed the sequence in Jersey City to pay homage to Khan's character, while also designing the murals themselves. The inspiration for the design is to show Jersey City from Khan's point of view while "celebrating the comic books and their artwork that this series is based on".

=== Filming ===
Filming took place at Trilith Studios, Blackhall Studios, and Areu Brothers Studios, with El Arbi and Fallah directing the episode, and Robrecht Heyvaert serving as cinematographer. Establishing shots were also filmed in New Jersey.

The integration of the animated elements took a lot of planning during pre-production, and did not allow the directors any ability to improvise how those sequences were shot. El Arbi called the sequence with Khan and Carrelli biking "technically very difficult" since it was a single take shot that needed the dialogue to match up with the pre-planned animations for the walls behind them. Another "super complex" shot was when Khan collapses onto her couch with the camera falling with her to make it look like she is on the ceiling; it took 15 days to craft the rig to execute the shot and about 20 takes for it to succeed.

Feige called filming on the AvengerCon set "cathartic" given the production was filming during the COVID-19 pandemic and comic conventions were not happening. He also hinted that Marvel Studios had discussed making AvengerCon an actual convention, while hinting that there would be a few places fans could experience Ms. Marvel's version of AvengerCon. Production designer Christopher Glass suggested the giant Ant-Man head cause destruction at AvengerCon, which was not originally scripted, taking inspiration from the opening sequence of Raiders of the Lost Ark (1981) where Indiana Jones is chased by a giant boulder.

=== Editing and visual effects ===
El Arbi and Fallah shot a large amount of footage on the AvengerCon set to create its montage sequence, revealing their initial director's cut had to be shorted by Marvel Studios. However, after positive reactions from test audiences to the sequence, Marvel Studios re-edited the sequence to be longer than what El Arbi and Fallah originally created. Visual effects for the episode were created by Method Studios, Digital Domain, Framestore London and Montreal, Trixter, RISE, Folks VFX, FuseFX, Base FX, SSVFX, Moving Picture Company, Stereo D, Cantina Creative, and The Mill London.

=== Music ===
The following songs were included in the episode: "Blinding Lights" by the Weeknd, "Disco Gully", "Deal with It" by Riz Ahmed, "I Don't Want to Talk" by Wallows, "Oh Nanba" by S. P. Balasubrahmanyam and Aaryan Dinesh Kanagaratnam, "OH!" by the Linda Lindas, "Ko Ko Koreena" by Ahmed Rushdi, "Sohniye I Love You" by Nahid Akhtar, "Sinkies" by Hot Sugar", "My Type" by Saint Motel, "Proudly Presents" by Samuel Pegg, "Rozi" by Eva B, and the Habanera aria from Carmen. Also featured during the AvengerCon sequence is Alan Menken's "Star Spangled Man" from Captain America: The First Avenger (2011).

== Marketing ==
External videos
- The REAL Carol Danvers Story presents Kamala Khan's video created at the start of the episode, YouTube video from Sloth Baby Productions' channel

A QR code was included in the episode that allowed viewers to access a free digital copy of Ms. Marvel's debut solo series, Ms. Marvel (2014) #1. Marvel created a real YouTube channel for Khan's in-universe channel, uploading the full version of The Real Carol Danvers Story which appeared in the episode. After the episode's release, Marvel announced merchandise inspired by the episode as part of its weekly "Marvel Must Haves" promotion for each episode of the series, including AvengerCon apparel, and Ms. Marvel-themed Funko Pop, Marvel Legends figure, accessories, apparel, and jewelry. Following the second episode's release, a viral marketing website for the New Jersey AvengerCon became active, describing the event, showing photos, and allowing visitors to purchase AvengerCon merchandise from Marvel.

== Release ==
"Generation Why" was released on Disney+ on June 8, 2022. It was released in Pakistan as part of a special theatrical release through licenser HKC Entertainment, due to Disney+ not being available in the country at that time, on June 16, 2022 along with the second episode. The episode aired on ABC as part of The Wonderful World of Disney, along with the second and third episodes, on August 5, 2023.

== Reception ==
=== Viewership ===
According to market research company Parrot Analytics, which looks at consumer engagement in consumer research, streaming, downloads, and on social media, Ms. Marvel achieved a 52% increase in demand just four days after its first episode aired. It became the ninth most in-demand new show for the week June 4–10, 2022 in the U.S., with 17.2 times the average series demand. Analytics company Samba TV, which gathers viewership data from certain smart TVs and content providers, reported that the premiere was watched by an estimated 775,000 households in the United States in the first five days of release, which was the lowest premiere of any of the MCU Disney+ live action series. Samba TV also reported Ms. Marvel was watched by 156,000 households in the United Kingdom in that same time frame. Cole Strain, vice president at Samba TV, noted that "Generation Why" was viewed by the most diverse audience compared to previous premiers, over-indexing among Black, Hispanic, and Asian households, as well as with Gen Z viewers aged 20–24. Nielsen Media Research, which records streaming viewership on U.S. television screens, calculated that Ms. Marvel was the tenth-most watched original series across streaming services for the week of June 6–12 with 249 million minutes watched. This was the lowest amount of minutes for all of the live action MCU Disney+ series to date, with the premiere week of Moon Knight being the next lowest with 418 million minutes. JustWatch, a guide to streaming content with access to data from more than 20 million users around the world, estimated that Ms. Marvel was the second-most watched series in the United States for the week ending June 12. Whip Media, which tracks viewership data for the more than 21 million worldwide users of its TV Time app, reported that Ms. Marvel was the fourth most-watched original streaming series in the U.S. during the same week.

=== Critical response ===
The review aggregator website Rotten Tomatoes reports a 96% approval rating with an average rating of 8.00/10, based on 112 reviews. The site's critical consensus reads, "Taking a page from its plucky protagonist's own splashy imagination, Ms. Marvel instantly establishes an identity of its own with this energetic opener."

Kristen Howard of Den of Geek called "Generation Why" the best first episode of Marvel Studios' Disney+ series. Howard felt the visuals and tone of the episode were an "irresistible sugar rush" combination of the end credits sequence from Spider-Man: Homecoming (2017) and the "spirit" of Spider-Man: Into the Spider-Verse (2018). As well, they said the episode "boasts a lot of the kind of fun we were denied when Marvel decided Spider-Man didn't need his own MCU origin story: a teen with relatable coming-of-age problems who also has to contend with suddenly acquiring superpowers", and gave the episode 5 out of 5 stars. Brian Silliman at SyFy Wire called the premiere episode "a cosmic delight" since it "retains the spirit of Kamala Khan", which was more important in his view than a direct adaptation, particularly with regards to her powers. Silliman also called Vellani "utter perfection" in portraying Khan.

The A.V. Club's Sarah Shaffi highlighted the use of culture and Islam throughout the episode which was "subtle but not hidden" and felt "realistic", adding that heritage would be one of the central plot points of the season, particularly for Khan's grandmother and her bangles. Additionally, Shaffi called the episode and series "really rich visually and sonically so far, with a bright jewel-toned color palette and choice soundtrack", giving the episode a "B+". Swara Salih, writing for Gizmodo, commented that the first episode "really shines" when showing the Muslim aspects of Khan's family life; however, other cultural aspects needed "fine tuning" such as some of Shroff and Kapur's dialogue, with their "accent choices com[ing] across as more culturally from more Indian Punjabi than Pakistani". Salih also hoped that the series would become "braver" in addressing Islamophobia, as the first episode watered down an encounter from comics and "whitewashes the reality that so many Muslim kids and adults still have to face from their non-Muslim peers".

=== Accolades ===
Editors Nona Khodai and Sabrina Plisco were nominated for Outstanding Picture Editing For A Limited Or Anthology Series Or Movie at the 75th Primetime Creative Arts Emmy Awards for their work on the episode.
