= Marvel Studios: Assembled =

2021–present Marvel Studios docuseries

- Genre: Anthology; Docuseries; Superhero
- Country of origin: United States
- Original language: English
- No. of specials: 23

Production
- Executive producers: Kevin Feige; Brad Winderbaum; Louis D'Esposito; Victoria Alonso; Jeff Redmond; Bradford Baruh
- Producers: John Pisani; Jason Hillhouse; Charlie Visnic
- Cinematography: Sean Ricigliano; Pete Chiaramonte; Anthony Rose; Bradley Hogan; Byron Werner; Zsolt Nagy
- Editors: Meghan Leon; Brenton Covington; Amir Shoucri; Charlie Visnic
- Running time: 41–66 minutes
- Production company: Marvel Studios

Original release
- Network: Disney+; YouTube (Note: Agatha All Along special only)
- Release: March 12, 2021 – November 13, 2024

Related
- Marvel Studios: Legends

Marvel Studios: Assembled is an American anthology television docuseries of specials created for the streaming service Disney+. Produced by Marvel Studios, each special goes behind-the-scenes of a Marvel Studios Disney+ series or film, particularly those within the Marvel Cinematic Universe (MCU), with the creatives, exploring the process of creating each series or film.

The series was first announced in February 2021. Marvel Studios: Assembled premiered on March 12, 2021, with subsequent specials releasing shortly after a Disney+ series' completion or a film's Disney+ release. 14 specials were released for Phase Four of the MCU, followed by 9 specials released for Phase Five projects through 2024, including one for the first season of the Marvel Studios Animation series X-Men '97 (2024). The special for Agatha All Along (2024) was released for free on Marvel Entertainment's YouTube channel. Assembled received positive responses for showcasing how each series or film came together, particularly with the technical aspects and franchise connectivity.

== Premise ==
The series goes behind-the-scenes of a Marvel Cinematic Universe (MCU) Disney+ series or film with the creatives, exploring the process of creating each series or film.

== Background ==
Marvel Studios: Assembled was announced in February 2021 as a documentary series of television specials that would go behind-the-scenes with an "in-depth examination" of the Marvel Cinematic Universe (MCU) television series and films in the franchise's Phase Four slate of content. Each "making of" special follows the filmmakers and the cast and crew members during the production of each project, with exclusive on-set footage used to compile the specials in the series. Assembled was announced to premiere on March 12, 2021, starting with a special for Marvel Studios's first MCU series WandaVision (2021).

Commentators called Assembled a companion series to fellow Marvel Studios docuseries Marvel Studios: Legends, which releases before a series or film to help inform viewers about relevant events to that series or film, while Hoai-Tran Bui and Ethan Anderton of /Film, and ComicBook.com's Charlie Ridgley each noted the similarities to the Disney Gallery: The Mandalorian documentary series for the Disney+ Star Wars series The Mandalorian. Ridgley and Matt Miller at Game Informer noted Assembled allowed Marvel Studios to provide more insight on how their content is produced and answer questions audiences may have regarding them. David Wolinsky of GameSpot felt Assembled was a "promising follow-up" to Marvel's Behind the Mask (2021), a documentary special highlighting the inspiration behind Marvel's comic book heroes.

Subsequent Assembled specials were released throughout 2021 for The Falcon and the Winter Soldier, the first season of Loki, the first season of What If...?, and the films Black Widow and Shang-Chi and the Legend of the Ten Rings. Specials continued to release throughout 2022 for Hawkeye, Eternals, Moon Knight, Doctor Strange in the Multiverse of Madness, Ms. Marvel, Thor: Love and Thunder, and She-Hulk: Attorney at Law, and a special for Black Panther: Wakanda Forever was released in early 2023 as the final special for a Phase Four property.

Specials for Phase Five of the MCU began in July 2023, with the release of a special for Ant-Man and the Wasp: Quantumania. This was followed by specials for Guardians of the Galaxy Vol. 3, Secret Invasion, and the second season of Loki. These continued into 2024 with specials for Echo, The Marvels, Deadpool & Wolverine, and Agatha All Along. A special for the first season of the non-MCU Marvel Studios Animation series X-Men '97 was also released later that year.

In June 2025, Matt Webb Mitovich of TVLine reported that there were no new episodes planned for Marvel Studios' releases in 2025 and beyond.

== Specials ==
Documentary specials in the Marvel Cinematic Universe
Phase	Specials	Originally released	
Phase	Specials	First released	Last released
Four	14	March 12, 2021	February 8, 2023
Five	9	July 19, 2023	November 13, 2024

=== Phase Four (2021–2023) ===
List of Marvel Studios: Assembled specials
No. overall	No. in phase	Title	Directed by	Written by	Original release date (Note: Each Assembled special is released following the conclusion of the associated series or season, or release of the associated film.)
1	1	"The Making of WandaVision "	Bradford Baruh	Meghan Leon	March 12, 2021
The special goes behind the scenes of the making of WandaVision, with head writer Jac Schaeffer, series director Matt Shakman, stars Elizabeth Olsen, Paul Bettany, Debra Jo Rupp, Kathryn Hahn, Teyonah Parris, Randall Park, Kat Dennings, and Evan Peters, theme song composers Robert Lopez and Kristen Anderson-Lopez, and additional creatives. Discussion includes the classic sitcoms that inspired the series, how the crew emulated the production processes of early sitcoms, and the experience of filming in front of a live studio audience for the first episode, "Filmed Before a Live Studio Audience".
2	2	"The Making of The Falcon and the Winter Soldier "	Bradford Baruh	Meghan Leon	April 30, 2021
The special goes behind the scenes of the making of The Falcon and the Winter Soldier, with head writer Malcolm Spellman, series director Kari Skogland, stars Anthony Mackie, Sebastian Stan, Wyatt Russell, Erin Kellyman, Don Cheadle, Daniel Brühl, Emily VanCamp, Florence Kasumba, Julia Louis-Dreyfus, and Clé Bennett, executive producer Nate Moore, and additional creatives. Discussion includes the importance of exploring racism within the narrative, as well as the series' action scenes and the impact of the COVID-19 pandemic on the production of the series.
3	3	"The Making of Loki "	Bradford Baruh	Meghan Leon	July 21, 2021
The special goes behind the scenes of the making of Loki, with head writer Michael Waldron, series director Kate Herron, stars Tom Hiddleston, Gugu Mbatha-Raw, Wunmi Mosaku, Owen Wilson, Sophia Di Martino, DeObia Oparei, Richard E. Grant, and Jonathan Majors, executive producer Stephen Broussard, and additional creatives. Discussion includes Hiddleston's history with the title character and the casting of other main characters, as well as the design and filming of each episode.
4	4	"The Making of Black Widow "	Bradford Baruh	Brenton Covington	October 20, 2021
The special goes behind the scenes of the making of Black Widow with director Cate Shortland, several producers, and the cast members including Scarlett Johansson, Florence Pugh, David Harbour, Rachel Weisz, Ray Winstone, and more. Discussion includes the journey of Black Widow in the MCU.
5	5	"The Making of What If...? "	Bradford Baruh	Meghan Leon	October 27, 2021
The special goes behind the scenes of the making of What If...? with creator A. C. Bradley, director Bryan Andrews, animator Stephan Franck, the producers, and actor Jeffrey Wright. Discussion includes the idea of What If...?, the creation, the animating of the show, and the casting.
6	6	"The Making of Shang-Chi and the Legend of the Ten Rings "	Bradford Baruh	Amir Shoucri and Jason Hillhouse	November 12, 2021
The special goes behind the scenes of the making of Shang-Chi and the Legend of the Ten Rings with director Destin Daniel Cretton, several producers, and the cast members including Simu Liu, Awkwafina, Meng'er Zhang, Michelle Yeoh, Ben Kingsley, Tony Leung, Benedict Wong and more. Discussion includes the introduction of a Chinese character into the MCU and examining aspects of the filming process.
7	7	"The Making of Hawkeye "	Bradford Baruh	Meghan Leon	February 9, 2022
The special goes behind the scenes of the making of Hawkeye, with series directors Rhys Thomas and Bert & Bertie, stars Jeremy Renner, Hailee Steinfeld, Tony Dalton, Fra Fee, Aleks Paunovic, Piotr Adamczyk, Vera Farmiga, Alaqua Cox, Florence Pugh, Vincent D'Onofrio, Carlos Navarro, Clayton English, Adelle Drahos, and Adetinpo Thomas, the producers, and additional creatives. Discussion includes the creation of the Broadway-style musical number "Save the City" and the reintroduction of D'Onofrio as Kingpin.
8	8	"The Making of Eternals "	Bradley Hogan	Charlie Visnic	February 16, 2022
The special goes behind the scenes of the making of Eternals with director Chloé Zhao, several producers, and the cast members Gemma Chan, Richard Madden, Kumail Nanjiani, Angelina Jolie, Lauren Ridloff, Lia McHugh, Brian Tyree Henry, Barry Keoghan, Don Lee, Salma Hayek, and Kit Harington. Discussion includes the set design, the costume design, the difficulties and benefits of shooting on location, and the diversity of the cast.
9	9	"The Making of Moon Knight "	Bradford Baruh	Amir Shoucri and Jason Hillhouse	May 25, 2022
The special goes behind the scenes of the making of Moon Knight with series directors Mohamed Diab, Aaron Moorhead, and Justin Benson, stars Oscar Isaac, Ethan Hawke, May Calamawy, Karim El Hakim, and Antonia Salib, the producers, and additional creatives. Discussion includes the depiction of dissociative identity disorder, the creation of the Egyptian sets, and the difficulties of Isaac playing against himself.
10	10	"The Making of Doctor Strange in the Multiverse of Madness "	Bradford Baruh	Steve Elkins	July 8, 2022
The special goes behind the scenes of the making of Doctor Strange in the Multiverse of Madness with director Sam Raimi, writer Michael Waldron, several producers, and the cast members Benedict Cumberbatch, Elizabeth Olsen, Benedict Wong, Rachel McAdams, Chiwetel Ejiofor, Xochitl Gomez, and Bruce Campbell. Discussion includes continuing Stephen Strange's story post-Endgame, the set design, introducing the multiverse, America Chavez and the Illuminati, and the impact of the COVID-19 pandemic on the writing and production of the film.
11	11	"The Making of Ms. Marvel "	Bradford Baruh	Meghan Leon	August 3, 2022
The special goes behind the scenes of the making of Ms. Marvel with head writer Bisha K. Ali, character creator Sana Amanat, the series' directors, stars Iman Vellani, Matt Lintz, Yasmeen Fletcher, Zenobia Shroff, Mohan Kapur, Saagar Shaikh, Laurel Marsden, Rish Shah, Nimra Bucha, Farhan Akhtar, and Aramis Knight, and additional creatives. Discussion includes the parallels between actress Iman Vellani and her character Kamala Khan, the importance of Kamala's family and friends within the series, the Order of the Red Dagger, AvengerCon, recreating Karachi on location in Thailand, and bringing the real-life event of the Partition of India into the story.
12	12	"The Making of Thor: Love and Thunder "	Bradford Baruh	Brandon Bestenheider and Brenton Covington	September 8, 2022
The special goes behind the scenes of the making of Thor: Love and Thunder with director and actor Taika Waititi, co-writer Jennifer Kaytin Robinson, cast members Chris Hemsworth, Natalie Portman, Tessa Thompson, and Christian Bale, and additional creatives. Discussion includes the challenges involved in taking Thor in new directions in a fourth film, reintroducing Portman into the franchise, shooting at the Volume, adapting children's drawings for the monster design, Russell Crowe's role as Zeus, and the weapon prop design.
13	13	"The Making of She-Hulk: Attorney at Law "	Bradford Baruh	Meghan Leon	November 3, 2022
The special goes behind the scenes of the making of She-Hulk: Attorney at Law with cast members Tatiana Maslany, Jameela Jamil, Josh Segarra, Mark Ruffalo, Tim Roth, Benedict Wong, and Charlie Cox, and additional creatives. Discussion includes handling the tone and She-Hulk breaking the fourth wall, and making Marvel Studios' first comedic series.
14	14	"The Making of Black Panther: Wakanda Forever "	Bradford Baruh	Brandon Bestenheider and Brenton Covington	February 8, 2023
The special goes behind the scenes of the making of Black Panther: Wakanda Forever with director Ryan Coogler, cast members Letitia Wright, Danai Gurira, Lupita Nyong'o, Winston Duke, Angela Bassett, Tenoch Huerta Mejía, Mabel Cadena, Alex Livinalli, and Dominique Thorne, and additional creatives. Discussion includes the death of Chadwick Boseman, the expansion of Wakanda, the Mesoamerican influence in the design of Talokan, the challenges of filming underwater, the film's stunt sequences, and the character arc of Shuri.

=== Phase Five (2023–2024) ===
List of Marvel Studios: Assembled specials
No. overall	No. in phase	Title	Directed by	Written by	Original release date
15	1	"The Making of Ant-Man and the Wasp: Quantumania "	Bradford Baruh	Brandon Bestenheider and Brenton Covington	July 19, 2023
The special goes behind the scenes of the making of Ant-Man and the Wasp: Quantumania with director Peyton Reed, cast members Paul Rudd, Evangeline Lilly, Jonathan Majors, Kathryn Newton, David Dastmalchian, Katy O'Brian, Michelle Pfeiffer, Corey Stoll, and Michael Douglas, and additional creatives. Discussion includes the creation of the Quantum Realm, fully introducing Majors as major Marvel villain Kang the Conqueror, Janet van Dyne's story in the Quantum Realm, and the character arc of Cassie Lang, now a young adult played by Newton.
16	2	"The Making of Guardians of the Galaxy Vol. 3 "	Bradford Baruh	Meghan Leon	September 13, 2023
The special goes behind the scenes of the making of Guardians of the Galaxy Vol. 3 with director James Gunn, cast members Zoe Saldaña, Chris Pratt, Karen Gillan, Pom Klementieff, Dave Bautista, Sean Gunn, Chukwudi Iwuji, Vin Diesel, Will Poulter, and Bradley Cooper, and additional creatives. Discussion includes wrapping up the Guardians trilogy in a meaningful and emotional way, the relationship and history between Rocket Raccoon and the High Evolutionary, fully introducing Adam Warlock and Cosmo, the Guardians headquarters set on Knowhere, and creating Orgocorps' planet as well as their ideal society called Counter-Earth.
17	3	"The Making of Secret Invasion "	Bradford Baruh	Meghan Leon and Brandon Bestenheider and Brenton Covington	September 20, 2023
The special goes behind the scenes of the making of Secret Invasion, with head writer Kyle Bradstreet, series director Ali Selim, cast members Samuel L. Jackson, Ben Mendelsohn, Emilia Clarke, Kingsley Ben-Adir, Don Cheadle, Cobie Smulders, Olivia Colman, and additional creatives.
18	4	"The Making of Loki: Season 2"	Bradford Baruh	Meghan Leon	November 22, 2023
The special goes behind the scenes of the making of the second season of Loki, with head writer Eric Martin, series directors Aaron Moorhead and Justin Benson, stars Tom Hiddleston, Sophia Di Martino, Gugu Mbatha-Raw, Wunmi Mosaku, Owen Wilson, Rafael Casal, Kate Dickie, Ke Huy Quan, and Jonathan Majors, executive producer Stephen Broussard, and additional creatives.
19	5	"The Making of Echo "	Bradford Baruh	Brandon Bestenheider and Brenton Covington	January 31, 2024
The special goes behind the scenes of the making of Echo, with head writers Marion Dayre and Amy Rardin, series director Sydney Freeland, cast members Alaqua Cox, Vincent D'Onofrio, Chaske Spencer, Devery Jacobs, Charlie Cox, Cody Lightning, Tantoo Cardinal, and additional creatives. Discussion includes Maya Lopez' journey after the events of Hawkeye, cast and crew members learning ASL for the production of the series, collaborating with the Choctaw nation, D'Onofrio's performance as Kingpin, Maya's brief fight with Daredevil, and creating the powwow for the final episode.
20	6	"The Making of The Marvels "	N/A	Jesse Latour	February 7, 2024
The special goes behind the scenes of the making of The Marvels with director Nia DaCosta, cast members Brie Larson, Teyonah Parris, Iman Vellani, and Zawe Ashton, and additional creatives. Discussion includes the dynamic between and character development of the three leads, the design of the quantum entanglement scenes, Carol Danvers's spaceship, creating the water planet Aladna, and bringing cats and kittens to set to portray Goose and the other Flerken.
21	7	"The Making of X-Men '97 "	Bradford Baruh	Meghan Leon	May 22, 2024
The special goes behind the scenes of the making of X-Men '97 with cast members from the original series X-Men: The Animated Series and X-Men '97 who reveal their behind-the-scenes stories, and it explores the origins of the original series.
22	8	"The Making of Deadpool & Wolverine "	Bradford Baruh	Meghan Leon	November 12, 2024
The special goes behind the scenes of the making of Deadpool & Wolverine, with director Shawn Levy, cast members Ryan Reynolds, Hugh Jackman, Emma Corrin, and Matthew Macfadyen, and additional creatives.
23	9	"The Making of Agatha All Along "	Bradford Baruh	Meghan Leon	November 13, 2024 (Note: Released on YouTube)
The special goes behind the scenes of the making of Agatha All Along, with showrunner and lead director Jac Schaeffer, cast members Kathryn Hahn, Joe Locke, Debra Jo Rupp, Aubrey Plaza, Sasheer Zamata, Ali Ahn, and Patti LuPone, and additional creatives.

== Release ==
Marvel Studios: Assembled premiered on March 12, 2021, on Disney+. Additional specials are released shortly after a Disney+ series' completion or a film's Disney+ release, with the first three specials debuting one week after the release of each series' finale. The specials for Shang-Chi and the Legend of the Ten Rings and Thor: Love and Thunder were released as part of the "Disney+ Day" event, respectively in 2021 and 2022, coinciding with the Disney+ releases of those films. The special for Agatha All Along was released for free on Marvel Entertainment's YouTube channel.

Several specials were released later than they were initially announced for: the Hawkeye special was originally announced to be released on January 19, 2022, although this was moved to February 9; the Moon Knight special was initially set for May 11, 2022, but ultimately released on May 25; the special for Doctor Strange in the Multiverse of Madness was intended to be released on July 1, 2022, before being pushed back and releasing a week later on July 8; and the special for Ant-Man and the Wasp: Quantumania was set to be released on June 14, 2023, but ultimately released on July 19. The latter's delay was believed to be due to the legal issues of that film's star Jonathan Majors. The special for the second season of Loki was moved forward from its initial release date of November 29, 2023, and ultimately released on November 22.

The Ultra HD Blu-ray and Blu-ray releases for some of the series included their documentaries as bonus features. These included Loki season one's release on September 26, 2023, WandaVision's on November 28, 2023, The Falcon and Winter Soldier and Moon Knight's on April 30, 2024, and Loki season two and Hawkeye's on December 3, 2024.

== Reception ==
=== Critical response ===
With the release of the special for WandaVision, Anderton recalled how Marvel Studios had gone from making the MCU as the "largest episodic experiment ever", according to that series' star Paul Bettany, into a "full fledged success" with its interconnectivity and felt Assembled allowed Marvel Studios to "dive into every aspect" of their upcoming productions, including the "spoiler-filled details" that were kept under wraps. Elaine Low, writing for Variety, said the WandaVision special was a "delightful deep dive" that explored the "massive scale and breadth" of the visual effects used for its episodes and the production design. Lucas Pearce at The People's Movies felt that special was a "great way to close the gap" between that series' finale by showing how it "all came together".

Regarding the special for The Falcon and the Winter Soldier, Anderton felt as that series was more straightforward than WandaVision, it was less compelling or enthralling, but highlighted the technical aspects of that production he found "surprising", such as showcasing the use of real skydivers for some frames, and the use of visual effects for some backgrounds in action scenes and on Sam Wilson's Captain America suit. He particularly highlighted stars Anthony Mackie and Sebastian Stan joking around together and a single take scene of Daniel Brühl in character as Baron Helmut Zemo promoting a Sokovian clothing store called Suit-kovia for a "makeshift commercial", which was filmed at the Brass Monkey nightclub set that was used for the series' Madripoor setting.

=== Accolades ===
"The Making of Black Panther: Wakanda Forever" was nominated for Outstanding Variety, Sketch, or Talk – Series or Special at the 2023 Black Reel Awards.

== Related documentaries ==
In November 2022, the documentary special Director by Night was released, going behind the scenes of the Marvel Studios Special Presentation Werewolf by Night (2022) with an emphasis on the life and career of its director and composer Michael Giacchino.
