= Carol Danvers (Marvel Cinematic Universe) =

Character in the Marvel Cinematic Universe

- Marvel Cinematic Universe character
- Brie Larson as Carol Danvers / Captain Marvel in Captain Marvel
- First appearance: Captain Marvel (2019)
- Based on: Carol Danvers by: Roy Thomas; Gene Colan
- Adapted by: Anna Boden; Ryan Fleck; Geneva Robertson-Dworet; Nicole Perlman; Meg LeFauve
- Portrayed by: Brie Larson; Mckenna Grace (13 years old); London Fuller (6 years old)
- Voiced by: Alexandra Daniels (What If...?)

In-universe information
- Aliases: Captain Marvel; Vers; Avenger (Note: Danvers' call sign as a U.S. Air Force fighter pilot)
- Species: Human mutate-Kree hybrid
- Titles: Captain; Princess of Aladna
- Occupation: Avenger; Starforce warrior; Fighter pilot
- Affiliation: Avengers; Skrulls; Kree Empire; Starforce; United States Air Force; Marvels
- Spouse: Prince Yan

Carol Susan Jane Danvers is a fictional character portrayed primarily by Brie Larson in the Marvel Cinematic Universe (MCU) media franchise—based on the Marvel Comics character of the same name—commonly known by her alias, Captain Marvel. Danvers is initially depicted as a U.S. Air Force fighter pilot who was given superhuman abilities when a light-speed engine test went wrong and she was exposed to the cosmic energy of the Tesseract. She was subsequently transformed into a Human-Kree hybrid via blood transfusion and renamed Vers.

Initially loyal to the Kree Empire, she serves as a member of the Starforce in their war against the Skrulls, but eventually returns to Earth where she regains her memories. She unlocks her dormant powers including superhuman strength, energy projection and absorption, and flight. She befriends Nick Fury, inspiring him to create the Avengers Initiative. Decades later, she returns to Earth, joins the Avengers and participates in the battles against Thanos. Danvers met Shang-Chi and his friend Katy while talking and analyzing the Ten Rings. However, Danvers intertwined her powers with those of Kamala Khan and Monica Rambeau, who swapped powers each time they used them, and together they formed The Marvels to face the Kree Supreme Dar-Benn, who possessed a quantum band to extract resources from other planets to restore Hala, wanting revenge against Danvers.

As of 2024, Danvers has appeared in four MCU films, as well as in the miniseries Ms. Marvel (2022). Alternate versions within the MCU multiverse appear in the animated series What If...? (2021; 2024), voiced by Alexandra Daniels.

== Fictional character biography ==
=== Origin and Kree–Skrull War ===
In 1995, on the Kree Empire's capital planet of Hala, Danvers, known as 'Vers' (taken from the remains of her damaged dog tag), suffers from amnesia and recurring nightmares involving an older woman, particularly as a former U.S. Air Force test pilot who acquired cosmic energy force powers from the Tesseract after an explosion that wiped out her memory. The Kree decide to use her as a weapon against the Skrulls. Yon-Rogg, her mentor and commander, trains her to control her abilities while the Supreme Intelligence, the artificial intelligence that rules the Kree, urges her to keep her emotions in check. During a mission to rescue an undercover operative infiltrating a group of Skrulls, Vers is captured by Skrull commander Talos. A probe of Vers's memories leads them to Earth. Vers escapes and crash-lands in Los Angeles. Her presence attracts S.H.I.E.L.D. agents Nick Fury and Phil Coulson, whose investigation is interrupted by a Skrull attack. Vers and Fury later go to the Project Pegasus installation at an Air Force base, where they find Goose. They discover Vers was a pilot presumed to have died in 1989 while testing an experimental light-speed engine designed by Dr. Wendy Lawson, whom Vers recognizes as the woman from her nightmares and Goose to be Lawson's pet. They, along with Goose who stowed away on their ship, fly to Louisiana to meet former pilot Maria Rambeau, the last person to see Vers and Lawson alive.

Rambeau and her daughter Monica reveal that Vers is Carol Danvers, who was once like family to them. Talos, arriving unarmed, explains that the Skrulls are refugees searching for a new home and that Lawson was Mar-Vell, a renegade Kree scientist helping them. Talos plays a recovered recording from Lawson's jet, prompting Danvers to remember the crash, whereby she absorbed the energy from the ensuing explosion, gaining powers but losing her memory. Devastated by the truth, she suffers a breakdown that Maria and Talos help her through.

Danvers, Talos, Fury, Goose, and Rambeau locate Lawson's cloaked laboratory orbiting Earth, where Lawson hid several Skrulls, including Talos' family, and the Tesseract – the power source of Lawson's engine. There, Danvers is captured by Starforce and interfaces with the Supreme Intelligence. Danvers removes the Kree implant that suppressed her powers during their conversation, allowing her to reach her full potential. In the subsequent battle, Fury retrieves Goose, who is revealed to be an alien called a Flerken. Goose swallows the Tesseract and scratches Fury, blinding his left eye. Danvers destroys a Kree bomber, forcing Kree officer Ronan the Accuser and his squadron to retreat before overpowering Yon-Rogg on Earth and sending him back to Hala with a warning to the Supreme Intelligence. Danvers departs to help the Skrulls find a new place to live, while leaving Fury a modified pager to contact her in an emergency.

However, by 1997, Danvers is unsuccessful in finding the Skrulls a home. (Note: As mentioned in Promises, the second episode of Secret Invasion (2023)) Danvers returns to Hala to fulfill her warning and after fighting off Dar-Benn and other Kree, uses her power to destroy the Supreme Intelligence. Her actions unintentionally causes Hala to lose natural resources and to undergo a civil war making her feel guilty. (Note: As depicted in The Marvels (2023))

=== Joining the Avengers and fighting Thanos ===
In 2018, Danvers is summoned via the pager by Fury during the Blip. (Note: As depicted in the post-credit scene of Avengers: Infinity War (2018)) Danvers returns to Earth and tracks the activated pager to the Avengers Compound where she meets Natasha Romanoff, Steve Rogers, Bruce Banner, James Rhodes, (Note: As depicted in the mid-credit scene of Captain Marvel (2019)) Rocket Raccoon, and Thor. She is then sent to rescue Tony Stark and Nebula, who were aimlessly drifting in the Benatar through space, and brings them back to the Compound. She is grief-stricken when informed about the Blip and joins Banner, Nebula, Rhodes, Rocket, Rogers, Romanoff, and Thor in confronting Thanos on the Garden planet. Danvers assists in subduing him when he reveals that he has destroyed the Infinity Stones to prevent his mission from being undone. Danvers then watches as Thor decapitates Thanos.

In 2020, Danvers meets with Rambeau at her house, who tells her to take and adopt Goose as she could no longer watch her. (Note: As depicted in a flashback in The Marvels (2023)) In 2023, Danvers has become a member of the Avengers under the leadership of Romanoff, involved in space missions helping to quash post-Blip chaos across the universe alongside Rocket and Nebula. Later, Danvers returns to Earth, after learning that the Avengers and their allies are engaged in battle with an alternate Thanos. She rescues them from a bombardment rained down from alternate Thanos' Sanctuary II warship and destroys it. She is then given the Nano Gauntlet by Peter Parker and attempts to fly it into the Quantum Tunnel. However, she is stopped by Thanos, who incapacitates her with the Power Stone. Stark then sacrifices himself to win the battle, and Danvers later attends his funeral, briefly reuniting with Fury.

=== Solo Missions ===
==== Meeting Shang-Chi ====
In 2024, Danvers and Banner answer Wong's holographic call to discuss the Ten Rings with Shang-Chi and his friend Katy. While she does not recognize anything alien about the Ten Rings, they discover the Ten Rings are emitting unknown signals before Danvers receives another call and leaves.

==== Teaming up with Kamala Khan and Monica Rambeau ====
In 2026, Danvers and Goose are living a quiet life in her spaceship when Fury calls asking her to investigate a jump point anomaly. She and Goose then go to an uninhabited planet, but after touching the anomaly, she gets transported away. She is transported to a bedroom in Jersey City, New Jersey. (Note: As depicted in the post-credit scene of No Normal, the sixth episode of Ms. Marvel (2022)) After seeing Captain Marvel posters and merchandise, she goes downstairs and finds a family in the living room, before making her exit. When she flies off, she gets brought back to the planet and gets attacked by Kree soldiers who tell her where Dar-Benn is heading for. She and Goose go to Tarnax and infiltrate the peace treaty negotiation between the Skrulls and Kree. However, she gets swapped again and finds herself in Fury's space pod, before using her powers and returning to the house from before. After getting swapped repeatedly, she was returned to Tarnax. Before she could confront some Kree, she was returned to the house and found that Goose, Fury, and Monica Rambeau were also there. Danvers asked Rambeau how she got powers and was told about going into a witch hex. Rambeau explained their entanglement with another person and as Danvers flew off to find her, she crashed back in the backyard of the house. She eventually returned to Tarnax where Rambeau and the other person, Kamala Khan, had been transported too. When Dar-Ben opened a jump point, Danvers told the Skrulls and their Emperor to evacuate into her spaceship. After escaping, Danvers called Valkyrie and was met by her who came and took the Skrulls to Earth. Danvers then spoke with Rambeau privately before introducing herself to Khan. She then saw Khan's bangle, identifying it as a Quantum Band. They worked together to control their entanglement and then learned that Dar-Benn was heading for Aladna. They arrived on Aladna, where Danvers was welcomed as a Princess by the population and reunited with Prince Yan, her husband, in his palace and were supplied with new suits. Danvers then helped fight against Dar-Ben, but on the ship, Khan accidentally pressed the controls, sending them through a jump point to another planet. Danvers explained to Rambeau why she never returned to her and about being responsible the Kree Civil War. They went to the S.A.B.E.R. space station, where Danvers saw several Flerken due to Goose having given birth and helped with the evacuation process. After learning Dar-Benn's next move, they intercepted her on the Kree ship, but she was able to take Khan's Quantum Band. Danvers tried to stop her, but Dar-Benn connected the Bands killing herself and tearing a hole in their universe into the multiverse. Danvers and Khan used their powers to energize Rambeau who volunteered to close the tear, but to their dismay, ended up getting stranded in the alternate universe. Danvers sent Khan back to Earth and restored Hala's Sun. Deciding to live on Earth, she moved into Rambeau's vacant house with Goose, getting help from Khan and her family in the move.

== Alternate versions ==
Several alternate versions of Danvers from within the MCU multiverse appear in the animated series What If...?, voiced by Alexandra Daniels.

- In an alternate 2011, Danvers is summoned by Nick Fury to fight the Asgardian army led by Loki alongside Steve Rogers following the death of the other Avengers Initiative candidates. During a battle on the Helicarrier, they are assisted by Natasha Romanoff from another universe.
- In an alternate 2011, Danvers is summoned by Maria Hill to stop Thor's out-of-control intergalactic party. Danvers confronts Thor, but he refuses to leave and fights Danvers. Forced to hold back her power to avoid collateral damage, Danvers retreats and formulates a plan with S.H.I.E.L.D. to lure Thor to a remote region in Siberia. Before they can fight again, Frigga intervenes, prompting Thor to quickly repair the damages he and his partygoers conflicted across the planet; he and Danvers reconcile.
- In an alternate 2015, Danvers defends Xandar against Ultron after the android acquires the Infinity Stones. She drives him into the planet's core in an attempt to destroy him, but is killed when Ultron unleashes the Stones' full power.
- In an alternate 2018, Danvers becomes a zombie, and is locked in a never-ending battle with the Eternal Ikaris at the "Valley of the Broken Gods".
- In an alternate universe, Danvers was captured and taken to a makeshift dimension by Doctor Strange Supreme. After being freed, she engaged in fights with other freed captives, such as Vision.

== Concept, creation and casting ==
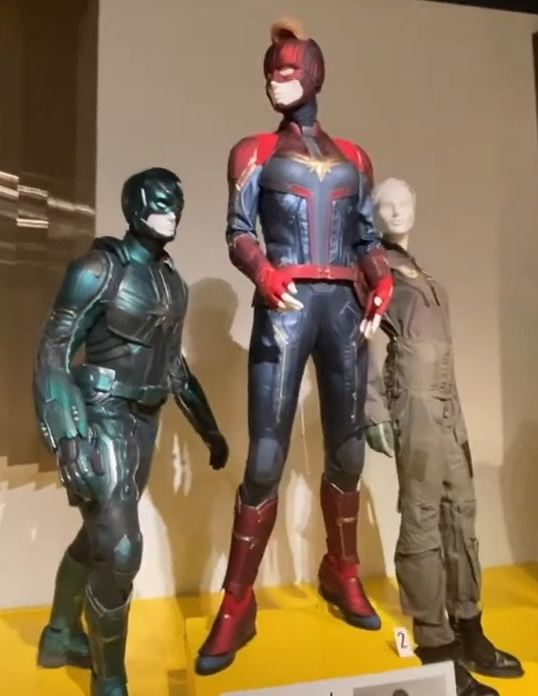
Three costumes of Danvers on display at the Fashion Institute of Design & Merchandising Museum, Los Angeles

Danvers originated as a comic book character in Marvel Super-Heroes #13 (March 1968) by writer Roy Thomas and artist Gene Colan. In the story, she is an officer in the United States Air Force and Security Chief of a restricted military base, where Danvers meets Dr. Walter Lawson, the human alias of alien Kree hero Captain Marvel. In a later story, Danvers is caught in the explosion of a Kree device after trying to get close to Captain Marvel. Although Captain Marvel manages to save her life, Danvers sustains serious injuries, later resurfacing with superhuman abilities and becoming the hero Ms. Marvel (created by writer Gerry Conway and artist John Buscema) in a self-titled series in January 1977, at first written by Gerry Conway and later by Chris Claremont. In the series, it is revealed that the energy exposure from the explosion of a device called the "Psyche-Magnetron" caused Danvers's genetic structure to meld with Captain Marvel's, effectively turning her into a human-Kree hybrid.

After her transformation as Ms. Marvel, Danvers as a character went through several developments throughout the years before becoming Captain Marvel. In the 1980s Danvers' stories are entangled with the X-Men mutants, starting when Rogue steals her powers and memories. In Uncanny X-Men series by Chris Claremont and Dave Cockrum, Danvers forgoes her identity as Ms. Marvel and subsequently uses the name Binary after being experimented on by the alien race the Brood which gives her the ability to generate the power of a star. However, in the 1990s Danvers loses the majority of her Binary power and regains her original power as Ms. Marvel. Writer Kurt Busiek and artist George Pérez then redefine her as Warbird as she joins the Avengers and fights against Kang the Conqueror. Afterwards, Danvers as Warbird continues to appear in major 2000s storylines such as, House of M, Civil War and Secret Invasion. During the Dark Reign storyline, Danvers returns as Ms. Marvel and fights against her imposter created by Norman Osborn.

After her introduction, Carol Danvers was meant to be an icon of the feminist movement as shown by her superhero name and being portrayed as a strong character. However, push-back from Marvel's then Editor-in-Chief Jim Shooter instead set a precedent for stories centred on the theme of victimization, with some of her most formative arcs involving alcoholism, torture, brainwashing, identity/power theft, kidnapping, and rape. Although not the ideal struggles expected of a hero, her tendency to bounce back from attempts to write her off and to overcome traumatic experiences and return stronger became a consistent theme in itself. As such, her continual appearances with Marvel's prominent characters throughout the decades turned Danvers into a premier heroine for the publisher. In the 2010s, Danvers eventually assumed the title Captain Marvel in the series by Kelly Sue DeConnick with a redesigned costume closer to a flight suit rather than the classic female superhero appearance. She also rejoined the flagship Avengers series New Avengers and was involved in major storylines such as the 2015 Secret Wars and 2016 Civil War II, where she leads the side advocating for stopping crime and attacks before they happen.

Marvel Studios President Kevin Feige said Larson was cast because of her ability to balance the character's vast powers with her humanity. Due to concern that Larson (who was 26 when she was cast) was too young to portray an accomplished airman, screenwriter Nicole Perlman consulted with the U.S. Air Force, who said it was possible for someone to excel between the ages of 28 and 34.

== Characterization ==
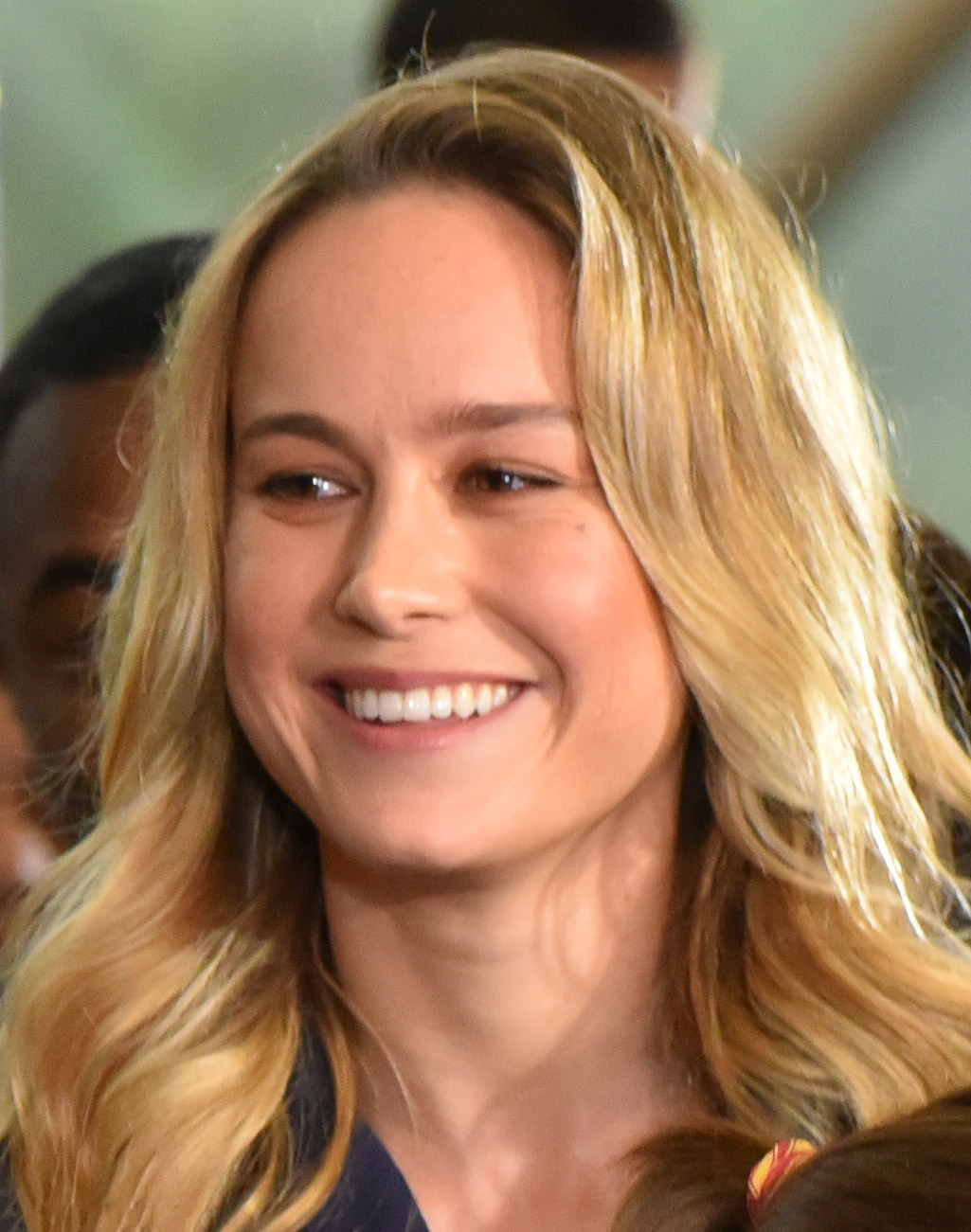
Brie Larson portrays Carol Danvers in the MCU

In the MCU, Danvers is an ex-U.S. Air Force fighter pilot and member of an elite Kree military unit called Starforce. She was imbued with superhuman strength, energy projection, and flight after exposure to Tesseract energy. Larson described Danvers as a "believer in truth and justice" and a "bridge between Earth and space", who must balance her unemotional Kree side with her "flawed" human half. Larson also called Danvers aggressive, quick-tempered, and invasive—attributes that help her in a fight but prove to be character flaws.

Brie Larson trained for nine months for the role, learning judo, boxing, and wrestling. She also visited Nellis Air Force Base and met with active-duty airmen, including Brigadier General Jeannie Leavitt and Thunderbirds pilot Major Stephen Del Bagno, in preparation for the role. Carol Danvers is portrayed as a thirteen-year-old by Mckenna Grace, and as a six-year-old by London Fuller.

In Avengers: Endgame, screenwriter Christopher Markus stated that Danvers's powers are on a scale that has not previously existed in the MCU and likened her personality to Steve Rogers, "which is sort of a person who's right and knows they're right and doesn't really want to hear it when you tell them they're wrong". Danvers has little screen time in the film, which McFeely reasoned as "not the story we're trying to tell—it's the original Avengers dealing with loss and coming to a conclusion, and she's the new, fresh blood." Larson filmed her scenes for Endgame before beginning work on her solo film Captain Marvel (2019), which was released first. Captain Marvel directors Anna Boden and Ryan Fleck were present for the filming of Larson's scenes in Endgame and gave Danvers's characterization in the film their blessing.

== Differences from the comics ==
In the comics, Carol goes by numerous superhero names before becoming Captain Marvel, with her first name being Ms. Marvel.

Furthermore, Carol Danvers received her powers through an exposure from an explosion of a Kree device called the "Psyche-Magnetron" while assisting Mar-Vell. The explosion caused her to mutate and becoming a human-Kree hybrid. In the Marvel Cinematic Universe (MCU) films, Carol received her powers from an energy exposure of an explosion when she destroyed a light-speed engine created by Mar-Vell. However, the energy comes from the Tesseract that housed one of the Infinity Stones, the Space Stone. She becomes a human-Kree hybrid later, when Yon-Rogg, a Kree officer, takes her to Hala and transfuses his blood to her.

In the MCU, Carol's activities on Earth in 1995 and her call sign, "Avenger", are the inspirations for Nick Fury's Avengers Initiative that created the Avengers. However, in the comics, the Avengers were created in response to Loki's invasion and later named by the Wasp.

== Reception ==
Following the release of Captain Marvel and Avengers: Endgame, A.O. Scott of The New York Times praised Carol Danvers's character, calling her a "tough and charming woman [... ] determined to fight gender clichés" who is "ready for a career of franchise clock-punching." Jacob Stalworthy of The Independent stated Carol Danvers has the potential to become "one of the best" characters from the MCU, saying, "Now her origin story is out of the way, the sky's the limit for her; it'll be exciting to see which planets her story scales next." Tara McNamara of Common Sense Media found Carol Danvers to be a positive role model, writing, "Carol Danvers is a fantastic role model: She always sees herself as capable, she's not objectified, male counterparts recognize her intelligence and strength, and she has a strong sense of integrity." Shana O'Neil of The Verge stated Captain Marvel depicts Carol Danvers as one of Marvel's strongest superheroes and called her "an admirable person, one with good friends and goals worth fighting for." Amanda Finn of Ms. wrote, "When we watch Captain Marvel, we witness an incredibly strong and funny woman being told to reign [sic] in her emotions from the very start. The fact that she doesn't immediately throw people around rooms just for the sake of smashing blatant misogyny is enough reason to keep watching. Captain Marvel is a level-headed person just trying to do her best with what she's got. She wants to protect those that need protecting and complete her mission, and she manages to make that happen despite the sexism that comes her way."

Callie Ahlgrim of Insider ranked Carol Danvers 2nd in their "ranking of all the Avengers, from least to most powerful" list. Richard Fink of MovieWeb ranked Carol Danvers 3rd in their "Strongest MCU Heroes" list, saying, "Essentially, Captain Marvel is the MCU Superman, a powerhouse fighter with great strength. Captain Marvel will turn out the champion in any physical fight." Simoun Victor Redoblado of Collider included Carol Danvers and Captain Marvel in their "10 Best MCU Narratives About Female Characters" list, writing, "Carol Danvers is the personification of power. [...] Carol embraced the responsibility of using her powers to help civilizations across galaxies. Now that's a strong message sent." Chris E. Hayne of GameSpot ranked Carol Danvers 15th in their "38 Marvel Cinematic Universe Superheroes" list, saying, "From her first '90s-soaked adventure through her appearance at the climax of Avengers: Endgame, we've got a good idea of how powerful Captain Marvel is. Power isn't everything, though, and after two appearances, we simply need more. That someone like Captain Marvel hasn't cracked the top 10 is telling. However, there's plenty more to come—namely The Marvels--that could improve her standing here." Hemal Jhaveri of USA Today ranked the relationship between Carol Danvers and Maria Rambeau 10th in their "Best relationships in the Marvel Cinematic Universe" list, stating, "As much as I love all things MCU, it is criminal that there are hardly any strong relationships between women in any of the movies until 2019's Captain Marvel. It is an oversight steeped in misogyny and while I'm glad Marvel producers learned the errors of their ways, they still have a long, long way to go. That said, the relationship between Carol Danvers and Maria Rambeau is a great look at female friendship."

Larson's portrayal of Carol Danvers was praised by multiple critics. Meg Downey of IGN found Captain Marvel to be a refreshing take in the MCU, stating that Larson's portrayal of Carol Danvers is a "stellar performance" that manages to give the character "a vibrant, joyful life that will fit right into the future" of the MCU. Peter Bradshaw of The Guardian called Larson's performance "fierce" across Captain Marvel, stating, "Larson has the natural body language of a superhero: that mixture of innocence and insouciance, that continuous clear-eyed idealism and indignation combined with unreflective battle-readiness, all the things that give MCU films their addictive quality." Kenneth Turan of Los Angeles Times praised Brie Larson's performance as Carol Danvers, calling her "luminous and powerful [...] with a knockout punch that would have daunted Muhammad Ali." Owen Gleiberman of Variety stated Larson provides an "emotional vibrance" across the film, writing, "Brie Larson lights up a Marvel superheroine film from within."

However, the character and the movie have also been the target of negative attention due to Brie Larson's perceived feminism. Some have been critical of the character suffering from the "Superman problem," calling her "overpowered" and "unrelatable," with concerns raised over how to convincingly write the character into established MCU plotlines without turning her into a Mary Sue.

=== Accolades ===
Accolades received by Carol Danvers
Award	Date of ceremony	Category	Film	Result	Ref.
MTV Movie & TV Awards	June 17, 2019	Best Hero	Captain Marvel	Nominated	
MTV Movie & TV Awards	June 17, 2019	Best Fight (vs. Gemma Chan)	Captain Marvel	Won	
National Film & TV Awards	December 3, 2019	Best Actress	Captain Marvel	Nominated	
Nickelodeon Kids' Choice Awards	May 2, 2020	Favorite Movie Actress	Captain Marvel and Avengers: Endgame	Nominated	
Nickelodeon Kids' Choice Awards	May 2, 2020	Favorite Superhero	Captain Marvel and Avengers: Endgame	Nominated	
Nickelodeon Kids' Choice Awards	July 13, 2024	Favorite Movie Actress	The Marvels	Nominated	
People's Choice Awards	November 10, 2019	Female Movie Star of 2019	Captain Marvel	Nominated	
People's Choice Awards	November 10, 2019	Action Movie Star of 2019	Captain Marvel	Nominated	
People's Choice Awards	February 18, 2024	The Action Movie Star of the Year	The Marvels	Nominated	
Saturn Awards	September 13, 2019	Best Actress	Captain Marvel	Nominated	
Teen Choice Awards	August 11, 2019	Choice Action Movie Actress	Captain Marvel	Nominated	

== In other media ==
Brie Larson reprises her role as Carol Danvers in the attraction Avengers: Quantum Encounter on the Disney Wish cruise ship. She also reprises her role in the theme park attraction Avengers Assemble: Flight Force in Disney Adventure World.

== See also ==
- Characters of the Marvel Cinematic Universe
