= Kamala Khan (Marvel Cinematic Universe) =

Character in the Marvel Cinematic Universe

- Marvel Cinematic Universe character
- Iman Vellani as Kamala Khan / Ms. Marvel in Ms. Marvel
- First appearance: "Generation Why"; Ms. Marvel; (2022)
- Based on: Kamala Khan by: Sana Amanat; Stephen Wacker; G. Willow Wilson; Adrian Alphona; Jamie McKelvie
- Adapted by: Bisha K. Ali
- Portrayed by: Iman Vellani
- Voiced by: Iman Vellani (Marvel Zombies)

In-universe information
- Full name: Kamala Khan
- Aliases: Ms. Marvel; Night Light
- Species: Mutant (Note: In The Marvels (2023), S.A.B.E.R.'s file on Kamala Khan additionally identifies her as a human with Inhuman heritage, as in Marvel Comics.)
- Affiliation: The Marvels (The Marvels); Avengers (Avengers: Quantum Encounter)
- Fighting style: Generation of hard-light constructs
- Family: Muneeba Khan (mother); Yusuf Khan (father); Aamir Khan (brother)
- Religion: Islam
- Origin: Jersey City, New Jersey, United States
- Nationality: Pakistani-American

Kamala Khan is a fictional character portrayed by Iman Vellani in the Marvel Cinematic Universe (MCU) media franchise—based on the Marvel Comics character of the same name—commonly known as Ms. Marvel. Kamala is a teenage Pakistani-American mutant from Jersey City, New Jersey who idolizes Carol Danvers and unlocks her dormant cosmic energy powers from the Noor dimension via a magical bangle. The MCU version of Kamala is reimagined as a latent mutant who can create glowing constructs, including stretching from her arms and legs, out of hard light.

Khan discovered her powers at AvengerCon, until she attracted the attention of the Department of Damage Control and the Clandestines, who were looking for a way to return to the Noor Dimension, although she managed to confront them with the help of her family and friends. However, Khan intertwined her powers with those of Danvers and Monica Rambeau, who swapped powers each time they used them, and together they formed The Marvels to confront the Kree Supreme Dar-Benn, who also possessed a quantum band like Khan's and was extracting resources from other planets to restore Hala. After Dar-Benn's defeat and Rambeau being stranded in another universe, Khan began using S.A.B.E.R.'s intelligence to assemble a team of young superheroes, starting with Kate Bishop.

Kamala first appeared in the Disney+ television miniseries Ms. Marvel (2022) as its main protagonist. She returned in the film The Marvels (2023) as a supporting character, while an alternate version of the character appears in the Disney+ animated television series Marvel Zombies (2025), as its main protagonist.

== Concept and creation ==
In November 2013, Marvel Comics announced that Kamala Khan, a teenage American Muslim from Jersey City, New Jersey, would take over the comic book series Ms. Marvel beginning in February 2014. The series, written by G. Willow Wilson and drawn by Adrian Alphona, marked the first time a Muslim character headlined a book at Marvel Comics. The conception of Kamala Khan came about during a conversation between Marvel editors Sana Amanat and Stephen Wacker. Amanat said, "I was telling him [Wacker] some crazy anecdote about my childhood, growing up as a Muslim American. He found it hilarious." The pair then told Wilson about the concept and Wilson became eager to jump aboard the project. Amanat said that the series came from a "desire to explore the Muslim-American diaspora from an authentic perspective." Artist Jamie McKelvie based Kamala's design on his redesign of Carol Danvers as Captain Marvel and on Dave Cockrum's design of the original Ms. Marvel. Amanat requested that the design "reflected the Captain Marvel legacy, and also her story and her background." Amanat stated that Kamala's costume was influenced by the shalwar kameez. They wanted the costume to represent her cultural identity, but did not want her to wear a hijab, because the majority of teenage Pakistani-American girls do not wear one. Amanat also stated that they wanted the character to look "less like a sex siren" to appeal to a more vocal female readership.

Marvel knew that they wanted a young Muslim girl, but stated that she could be from any place of origin and have any background. Wilson ultimately chose to create a Desi girl from Jersey City, which sits across the Hudson River from Manhattan and has been referred to as New York City's "Sixth borough". It therefore forms an important part of Kamala's identity and the narrative journey of her character since most of Marvel Comics' stories are set in Manhattan. Wilson explains, "A huge aspect of Ms. Marvel is being a 'second string hero' in the 'second string city' and having to struggle out of the pathos and emotion that can give a person." The series not only explores Kamala's conflicts with supervillains but also explores conflicts with Kamala's home and religious duties. Amanat later revealed that when she and Wilson were creating Kamala, the character was originally going to be a mutant before they changed her to being an Inhuman, an origin recanonised in The Marvels (2023).

In September 2016, Marvel Entertainment's Creative Consultant Joe Quesada stated that Ms. Marvel would appear in "other media" as result of the character's quick success amongst readers, which he noted "doesn't happen a lot" and acknowledged that it probably would not have happened ten years ago. Marvel Studios President Kevin Feige said in May 2018 that a Marvel Cinematic Universe (MCU) project based on Kamala Khan was "in the works", and would follow the release of the film Captain Marvel (2019) as Kamala is inspired by that film's title character Carol Danvers. The Ms. Marvel television series was officially announced at the 2019 D23 conference. In September 2020, newcomer Iman Vellani was cast in the lead role of Kamala. Kamala Khan co-creator Amanat, who is also serving as a co-executive producer on the television series, highlighted Vellani's Zoom audition which revealed that Vellani is an Avengers fangirl like Kamala. Amanat said, "She showed me every corner of her room, and it was covered with Avengers. Then she said, 'Oh wait, I'm not done', opened up her closet, and there was more Marvel everywhere".

=== Characterization ===
Kamala is an aspiring artist, avid gamer, and writes superhero fan fiction about the heroes she admires. She struggles to fit in at her high school and at home. Amanat said that Kamala "isn't your traditional Avenger. She's not as slick and suave as some superheroes. It's not like when Captain America throws his shield and it comes back. She's all over the place".

=== Appearance and special effects ===
The powers do look different, which is very controversial. [...] I know people are upset about it, but as someone who's probably one of the closest people to this character from the inception, and having spoken to Willow about this as well, I think Willow and I have always felt that this made sense. [...] It's really fun to give Kamala different kinds of powers that feel big in scope and cinematic in a different way. [...] At the same point, the essence of what the powers are in the comics is there, both from a metaphorical standpoint and from a visual standpoint. We're doing the embiggened fist. [...] I think it's going to be familiar to people, but at the same time, different in a fresh and unique way.

— Ms. Marvel co-creator Sana Amanat on the nature of adaptations

In the comics, Kamala is classified as a "polymorph" with moves that "are basically Ant-Man and Mister Fantastic's combined". When asked in August 2019 about the transition of Kamala from comic book to live-action, G. Willow Wilson stated, "I think there're some characters who are very much set up for the big screen; they're very naturally sort of cinematic. But with Ms. Marvel, we really weren't interested in creating something that had very obvious film potential. […] She's got very comic booky powers. God bless them trying to bring that to live action; I don't know how that's going to work out in a way that doesn't look really creepy". In the Ms. Marvel television miniseries, Kamala unlocks the ability to harness cosmic energy and create constructs from a magical bangle, which differs from the shapeshifting abilities that she has in the comics.

In May 2022, Feige explained that the Inhuman source of her abilities in the comics did not "match" with the timeline and events of the MCU, so her powers were adjusted to be related to her Pakistani heritage. They were also brought closer to the cosmic powers of the other heroes in the film The Marvels (2023), which Vellani co-stars in. Feige added that the character's "giant hands and arms" would still appear in the series "in spirit". Tyler Macready, writing for Collider, commented that "the decision to fundamentally reinterpret her powers is an interesting one" and that the bangle Kamala discovers unlocks her "ability to create and manipulate a kind of purple 'hard-light'"; Kamala pulls off moves similar to her comics' abilities "such as enlarging her fist to punch bad guys, or stretching limbs to make a far leap – albeit with a radically new visual aesthetic. […] The new powers allow Kamala to do new things, such as create shields and walk on air". Macready stated that this new power set grants Kamala cosmic abilities that are more similar to others in the "Marvels" family and set her apart from the abilities that other MCU heroes, such as Ant-Man, Wasp and Mister Fantastic, have. He also highlighted that this decision means that the show won't have to "render stretching, elongating limbs on a Disney+ budget".

== Fictional character biography ==
=== Early life ===
Kamala Khan is a Muslim Pakistani American from Jersey City, New Jersey with immigrant parents of Muhajir origin, mother Muneeba and father Yusuf. She has an older brother, Aamir. Khan grew up venerating the Avengers, particularly Carol Danvers. She became friends with Bruno Carrelli at an early age and attends Coles Academic High School where she became best friends with Nakia Bahadir. In her free time, Kamala creates various Avengers fan content such as fan-fiction, art, and cosplay. She also listens to podcasts such as one hosted by Scott Lang and runs her own YouTube channel called Sloth Baby Productions, which focuses on the Avengers, with videos about Lang and Hope van Dyne's relationship, and Thor being a secret gamer.

The series describes Kamala's heritage as coming from pre-partition India; it details that when Kamala went to visit Karachi, her grandmother shared: "My passport is Pakistani and my roots are Indian. And in between is a border, built with blood and pain."

=== Becoming Ms. Marvel ===
==== Discovering cosmic powers ====
In 2025, Khan creates a Sloth Baby production on YouTube about the Battle of Earth, as well as a Captain Marvel outfit to compete in a cosplay contest at the upcoming Avengers fan convention. However, she struggles to receive permission from her parents to attend AvengerCon and instead develops a plan to sneak out with Carrelli in order to go. To finish her cosplay costume, she adds the bangle sent from her grandmother, Sana Ali, in the mail. She and Carrelli arrive at AvengerCon in Camp Lehigh and she puts her bangle on which causes her to project constructs of cosmic energy that inadvertently cause havoc. She saves her classmate, Zoe Zimmer, using an embiggened hand. After the incident, Khan is rushed out of Camp Lehigh by Carrelli and returns home, but is caught by her mother.

The next day, Carrelli deduces the bangle activated Khan's own latent superpowers. Later, Khan, Carrelli, and Bahadir are invited to attend Zimmer's party and there, Khan meets the new high school senior, Kamran. She becomes infatuated with Kamran and after he takes her on a driving lesson, they go on a date together. She also begins to question to her parents how her great-grandmother Aisha disappeared in the partition of India and, as such, asks at the annual Eid celebration. There, Khan saves a young boy from slipping off a balcony and is called "Night Light" by the community. Retreating to an alley, Khan is chased by Department of Damage Control drones and agents led by agent Sadie Deever; she is saved by Kamran, who introduces her to his mother, Najma, the person who she had been seeing in her visions.

==== Learning of the Clandestines ====
Khan is taken to Najma's friend's house where Najma explains that she and Kamran are part of a group of enhanced beings known as Clandestines who claim to be Djinn that were exiled from the Noor dimension, and that Aisha was one of them. She also reveals that the bangle might be able to help them return, and asks for her help. She agrees to help them, but Carrelli warns her that interdimensional travel could be dangerous, so she asks Kamran for more time to ensure that they can do it safely. Kamran assents, but Najma refuses to wait and decides to force Khan to help them. Aamir marries his fiancée Tyesha Hillman, but Kamran arrives at the wedding and warns Khan that the Clandestines are coming. Khan, Carrelli, and Kamran try and fend off the Clandestines, but Najma stabs the bangle, which triggers a vision of a train, and Damage Control agents arrive on the scene. Khan and an injured Carrelli escape through the back exit, but run into Bahadir who sees Khan using her powers and becomes upset that she was never told. Later that night, Khan receives a call from Sana revealing that she also saw the vision of the train and insists that she and Muneeba visit her in Karachi, Pakistan.

==== Traveling to Karachi ====
Khan and Muneeba travel to Karachi and reunite with Sana and her golden retriever, Magnum, at Sana's house. Khan speaks to Sana about the vision and she reveals to Khan that the bangle is trying to convey a message through the vision of the train. The next day, Khan wearing a mask goes to the train station to investigate, but is attacked by Kareem, a member of the Red Daggers, who initially mistakes her for one of the Clandestines. Kareem takes her to the Red Daggers' hideout, where she learns from their leader, Waleed, that the Clandestines are trying to break the Veil of the Noor dimension, which separates the Clandestines' dimension from the human world, in order to expand and take over. Kamala begins training with the Red Daggers to master her powers, but they are interrupted by the Clandestines. A chase ensues, during which Waleed kills one of the Clandestines but is fatally stabbed by Najma. As Khan and Kareem fend off the Clandestines, Kareem kills one of them and Najma accidentally stabs the bangle, sending Kamala into the partition of India in 1947.

Khan is able to interact with Aisha, who asks her to guide a young Sana before dying. Conjuring a projection of stars to lead Sana to her father, Khan realizes she was the one who reunited them. Returning to the present, she finds that Najma's strike had opened the Veil, but it vaporizes anyone who interacts with it. Najma transfers her power to Kamran before sacrificing herself to close the Veil. Khan and Kareem are then met by Sana and Muneeba, with the latter accepting Khan's powers.

==== Protecting Jersey City ====
After returning to Jersey City, Khan learns that Carrelli's store Circle Q exploded and that Deever has ordered a lockdown. She is then given a gift in the form of a costume from Muneeba using Kareem's cloth before reuniting with Carrelli and Kamran in an alleyway. They go to Coles, where she calls Kareem asking for his help with Kamran. She then reunites with Bahadir, and receives help from her, Zimmer, and Aamir. They stall the DODC agents as Deever leads a detachment of agents to storm the school. However, the agents arrests everyone except for her and Kamran, who confronts Deever outside. Deever attacks him, but Khan helps him fight off the agents, allowing her friends and Aamir to escape. She helps Kamran escape, telling him that a Red Dagger representative would take him to Karachi. Afterwards, Khan becomes a beloved figure in her community and takes the superhero name "Ms. Marvel" from her father.

A week later, Khan goes out with Bahadir and Carrelli, before Carrelli leaves for Caltech. While out, Carrelli tells Khan she has a genetic mutation. (Note: It is implied Kamala is a mutant.) Sometime later, Khan's bangle emits a strange glow in her bedroom and she is transported elsewhere. (Note: This is a scene from The Marvels (2023))

=== Forming the Marvels ===
In 2026, in her bedroom, Khan daydreams and does some hand drawn fan-fiction of her and Danvers. Afterwards, her bangle emits a strange glow and she gets transported elsewhere. (Note: As depicted in the post-credit scene of the sixth episode of Ms. Marvel (2022)) Khan finds herself in an astronaut suit outside of the S.A.B.E.R. space station. She panics about being in space and then sees Nick Fury from the station and introduces herself, before suddenly getting transported back to her house. There she learns that Danvers had been in the house. Khan then keeps getting switched out, appearing on a Kree spaceship, on Fury's space pod, and back on the Kree spaceship again where she meets Danvers' pet Flerken, Goose, inadvertently bringing Goose with her to her house.

Khan and her family are soon visited by Fury and Monica Rambeau, where Khan finds a S.A.B.E.R. device revealing that they had a profile of her. After she tries to show her powers to them, she gets sent back to the Kree spaceship. She then gets switched and falls from the sky, forcing Rambeau to try to help her. She uses her powers to encase her and Rambeau in hard light, allowing them to both switch with Danvers and land on the Kree spaceship on the planet, Tarnax, where Dar-Benn approaches them. Danvers then arrives and the three go to Danvers' ship. They stand with the Skrull refugee colony as Dar-Benn rips open another jump point, which siphons the atmosphere of Tarnax into Hala to try and restore its air. After a hasty effort to evacuate the colony, Danvers, Rambeau, and Khan form a team informally referred to by Khan as "the Marvels". Danvers informs the others of the legend that the Quantum Bands had been used to create the jump point transportation network; the three became entangled due to their mutual contact with its energy when Dar-Benn disrupted it. Dar-Benn's repeated rupturing of jump points is causing further instability to the network and endangering the universe.

The three pursue Dar-Benn to Aladna, a planet rich in water and where Danvers' husband, Prince Yan, lives. There they fight against Dar-Benn but while back in the ship, Khan accidentally takes them through a jump point onto another planet. The three then go to the S.A.B.E.R. space station and find several of Goose's Flerken offspring which they use to evacuate the station. The three then leave to confront Dar-Benn on her ship near the Earth's Sun, but she steals Khan's Band and uses both bangles in conjunction to tear open another hole in space. The effort in doing so destroys Dar-Benn and leaves behind an opening into the multiverse. Khan puts on the second Band and then she and Danvers use their combined powers to energize Rambeau, allowing her to close the hole from the other side, but leaving her stranded in the process. Khan returns alone to New York City meeting with Fury and her family and tells them about Rambeau's situation. Khan and her family then help Danvers and Goose move into Rambeau's house in Louisiana.

The short-lived team-up inspires Khan to seek out young heroes and form a new team. She goes back to New York City to the apartment of Kate Bishop and Lucky, and asks Bishop to join, while also mentioning Cassie Lang and others.

== Alternate versions ==
=== Other universes ===
In an alternate universe, Kamala wears a mix of her Ms. Marvel costume with the Wasp helmet.

=== Zombie Apocalypse survivor ===
In an alternate universe where a zombie plague infected the world, Kamala Khan was among the survivors of the infection, and formed a group with Riri Williams and Kate Bishop. Upon finding a shrunken device inside of a zombie S.H.I.E.L.D. agent, the trio deduced that the device may be able to help the world. To confirm this, they traveled to a S.H.I.E.L.D. base located in Ohio. Along the way, they encountered a storm and crater in the mountains caused from the fighting between a zombie Carol Danvers and Ikaris. After Kate's death, Kamala is sent away with the device and the help of the natural-language user interface F.R.I.D.A.Y., who returns to help Riri. Losing her friends, Kamala is saved by Blade Knight who agrees to help her take the device to the Ohio S.H.I.E.L.D. base and they encounter Melina Vostokoff, Alexei Shostakov, and Yelena Belova who have used Melina's technology to control various zombies. They discover that the device must be taken into outer space to transmit to Nova Corps for help until the base falls under attack by a zombie Okoye, leading an army of zombies for the Queen of the Dead. In a tragic battle, Kamala, Blade, Shostakov, and Belova manage to escape and decide to go into outer space. They take refuge in Helmut Zemo's sanctuary, The Raft, upon encountering Shang-Chi's group. However, they fall into a trap set by Zemo to be sacrificed to the Talokanil zombie horde, led by a zombie Namor, who is then killed by Kamala. She and the remaining team escape, leaving Belova behind, sacrificing herself as the Raft floods, and they head to New Asgard.

Kamala and her group arrive at New Asgard, with Blade convincing Valkyrie to let them in with the help of his Khonshu pantheon. Upon entering, they see the Asgardians feasting on a gift from the Queen of Sokovia, revealed to be Zombie Wanda, the Queen of the Dead. The food was actually zombie remains, turning the Asgardians and the Red Guardian into zombies, and Zemo, Woo, and Dealer are killed by the zombies. Kamala, Shang-Chi, Katy, Blade, and Valkyrie flee while Thor battles Zombie Wanda, taking the opportunity to escape on the Asgardian spaceship beyond the atmosphere, where they activate the beacon. Upon rendezvousing with the Nova Corps in space, they reveal that Earth is under quarantine and no one is coming to help. After being shot down by the Nova Corps and falling back to Earth, they are saved and greeted by Peter Parker, Scott Lang's head, and the sorcerers of Kamar-Taj, who reveal that the energy of the Infinity Stones is being contained by the Hulk, who has become "Infinity Hulk". Arriving to help defend the Hulk, the remaining heroes falling one by one, Kamala is convinced by the zombie Wanda to help her remake the world. After a blinding energy blast, Kamala awakens to find Riri and Kate; everything seems back to normal. However, reality fades, and the real Riri, who survived, says she has hacked the system and that what Kamala is seeing is not real.

== Reception ==
Both Charles Pulliam-Moore of The Verge, and Eric Francisco of Inverse, both highlighted Kamala's fan obsessions. Pulliam-Moore also highlighted that, "like in the comics, Kamala's faith and ethnicity are important aspects of her identity, and the show explores how and why kids of color like her don't always feel like the world sees them as people meant to become champions." Destiny Jackson, for Empire, commented that "Kamala feels like she doesn't quite fit anywhere, a quirky teen who exists on the fringes of popular high school society. What she lacks in understanding the more practical aspects of everyday life, she makes up for in passionate ideas about what type of person she wants to be, and how she fits into her world." Caroline Framke, in a review of Ms. Marvel for Variety, wrote that "the looming specter of Marvel obligations to come almost makes this series, with its determination to make Kamala an individual and her neighborhood a home, an even more precious commodity. Before Kamala formally becomes Ms. Marvel and gets subsumed into something greater than herself, she just gets to be herself, and that's more than enough." Kimberly Terasaki of the feminist "geek site" The Mary Sue wrote that the origin story changes serve "the medium [Kamala's] story is told in. […] Instead of being a popular fanfic author, she's a no-name fan art stop-motion animator, which shows not only her struggle to make a name for herself but also allows for the show to have a very unique art style to play with Kamala's perspective on her world." Joyce Slaton of Common Sense Media found Kamala to be a positive role model, writing, "Kamala is a humble character who realizes she has extraordinary powers and uses them to increase the amount of good in the world, sending strong messages of courage and integrity." Chris E. Hayner of GameSpot ranked Kamala 22nd in their "38 Marvel Cinematic Universe Superheroes" list, writing, "Kamala Khan has entered the MCU and we couldn't be more excited. Sure, her powers are a bit of a remix of what we know from the comics, but it's all very exciting. At this point, though, she's still figuring out how to be a proper superhero."

Vellani's portrayal of Kamala Khan in Ms. Marvel was praised by multiple critics. Emma Fraser, for IGN, commented that "Vellani is equally charming as Hailee Steinfeld — you would never know that this is her acting debut." Kathryn Porter, for Paste, wrote that "Vellani shines as Kamala, and it is without question that she'll be able to make the jump to the big screen when The Marvels comes out next summer." Proma Khosla, for IndieWire, called Vellani "transcendent" and commented that her portrayal of Kamala "is disarmingly, consistently, potently endearing […]. Much of this is conveyed with secret smiles and giddy looks, or the abject sincerity of her friendships with Bruno (Matt Lintz) and Nakia (Yasmeen Fletcher)." Anna Moeslein of Glamour praised Vellani's performance, stating, "Iman Vellani is so perfectly cast as Kamala Khan—a.k.a. Ms. Marvel—that it's hard to believe it's real." Brian Lowry of CNN found Vellani "utterly charming" across the series. Mira Purnamasari and Chandreyee Ray of Vogue called Vellani's performance "excellent," stating she manages to make the character relatable, writing, "The 19-year-old, who will reprise the role of Ms. Marvel in the upcoming film The Marvels, injects her character with a sense of bright-eyed wonder that makes her impossible not to like.

=== Differences from the comics ===
The changes to Kamala's powers from the comics was also highlighted in reviews of Ms. Marvel, with several critics commenting on the new origin's more personal connection. Terasaki highlighted that Kamala's comic powerset "would be near impossible to adapt to good effect, even if they had the CGI budget" for it. Kaitlyn Booth, for Bleeding Cool, stated that the live-action abilities "actually look pretty good overall." In contrast, Alan Sepinwall, for the Rolling Stone, called these abilities "more generic" than the comics powers. Pulliam-Moore wrote that the live-action abilities "are only able to approximate the flashy aspects of what was originally a nuanced metaphor in the comics. [...] But the show doesn't go nearly as far with its hero in terms of using its conceit to explore ideas like internalized racism or the pressures Western (read: white) beauty standards put on people of color." G. Willow Wilson, one of the character's creators, had previously described that during the development of Kamala's powers, it was chosen not to give her "sparkly, hand wave-y, floaty, pretty powers," which Porter felt was "one of the most important things about her in the comics, and losing that in favor of powers that are, in fact, sparkly, hand wave-y, floaty, and pretty is really unfortunate. Sure, the powers could have pushed the show into the realm of the uncanny valley, but that is also of the point of them. Given the proper amount of time, the VFX artists working on Ms. Marvel absolutely could have figured out how to make things work visually, and the show would have been better for it."

In the series finale of Ms. Marvel, "No Normal", it is revealed that Kamala Khan has a genetic mutation, which implied she is a mutant through a musical excerpt of the X-Men '97 main theme. Vellani confirmed that Kamala was the first mutant in the MCU, and Ali said this explains why other members of her family do not have powers. Amanat and Wilson originally intended for Kamala to be a mutant in the comics.

Following the end of Ms. Marvel, the comics version of Kamala was retroactively established to be a mutant-Inhuman hybrid, which allowed her to be resurrected via the mutant resurrection protocols after her death in the series The Amazing Spider-Man. Kamala's mutant abilities are similar to her MCU counterpart and allow her to create purple light constructs, which she uses in conjunction with her shapeshifting abilities.

=== Accolades ===
Year	Award	Category	Work	Result	Ref.
2022	Saturn Awards	Best Performance by a Younger Actor (Streaming)	Ms. Marvel	Won	
2023	Critics' Choice Super Awards	Best Actress in a Superhero Series	Ms. Marvel	Nominated	
2023	Washington D.C. Area Film Critics Association	Best Youth Performance	The Marvels	Nominated	
2023	Las Vegas Film Critics Society	Best Youth in Film (Female)	The Marvels	Nominated	
2023	Indiana Film Journalists Association Awards	Breakout of the Year	The Marvels	Nominated	
2024	Astra TV Awards	Best Actress in a Streaming Limited or Anthology Series or Movie	Ms. Marvel	Nominated	
2024	Critics' Choice Super Awards	Best Actress in a Superhero Movie	The Marvels	Won	

== In other media ==
Vellani reprises her role as Kamala Khan in the theme park attraction Avengers: Quantum Encounter on the Disney Wish cruise ship.

== See also ==
- Characters of the Marvel Cinematic Universe
- Lists of Marvel Cinematic Universe cast members
