= Travina Springer =

American actress and comedian

- Education: Florida State University
- Occupations: Actress, comedian
- Television: Ms. Marvel (2022), The Irrational (2023—2025)

Travina Springer is an American actress and comedian. She is best known for her roles in the NBC drama The Irrational and the Disney+ series Ms. Marvel.

== Life and career ==
Because Springer's father served in the military, she lived in many different places growing up, before settling in Florida. She began studying ASL in high school and is fluent in the language. She was raised Baptist, but as an undergraduate at Florida State University, Malcolm X's autobiography struck a chord with her and she converted to Islam shortly thereafter.

Springer trained in sketch comedy at UCB Theatre and performed on a house team. As a stand-up comedian she has performed at The Comedy Store and also appeared on BET's ComicView reboot. She has also performed on tour for the nonprofit Deaf West Theatre. Her film appearances include Valentine's Day (2010), The Mule (2018), We Bare Bears: The Movie (2020), and To Live and Die and Live (2023).

Springer gained wider prominence on the Disney+ miniseries Ms. Marvel (2022) in the role of Kamala Khan's sister-in-law Tyesha Hill, a Muslim convert who wears a hijab. Her on-screen husband Aamir Khan is played by her friend Saagar Shaikh, who she worked with previously on the web series Unfair & Ugly. The parallel to Springer's own experience as a convert is part of what drew her to the role. In 2023 she was cast in her first lead television role as the character Kylie in the NBC drama The Irrational, which ran for two seasons.
