= Iman Vellani =

Pakistani-born Canadian actress and comic book writer (born 2002)

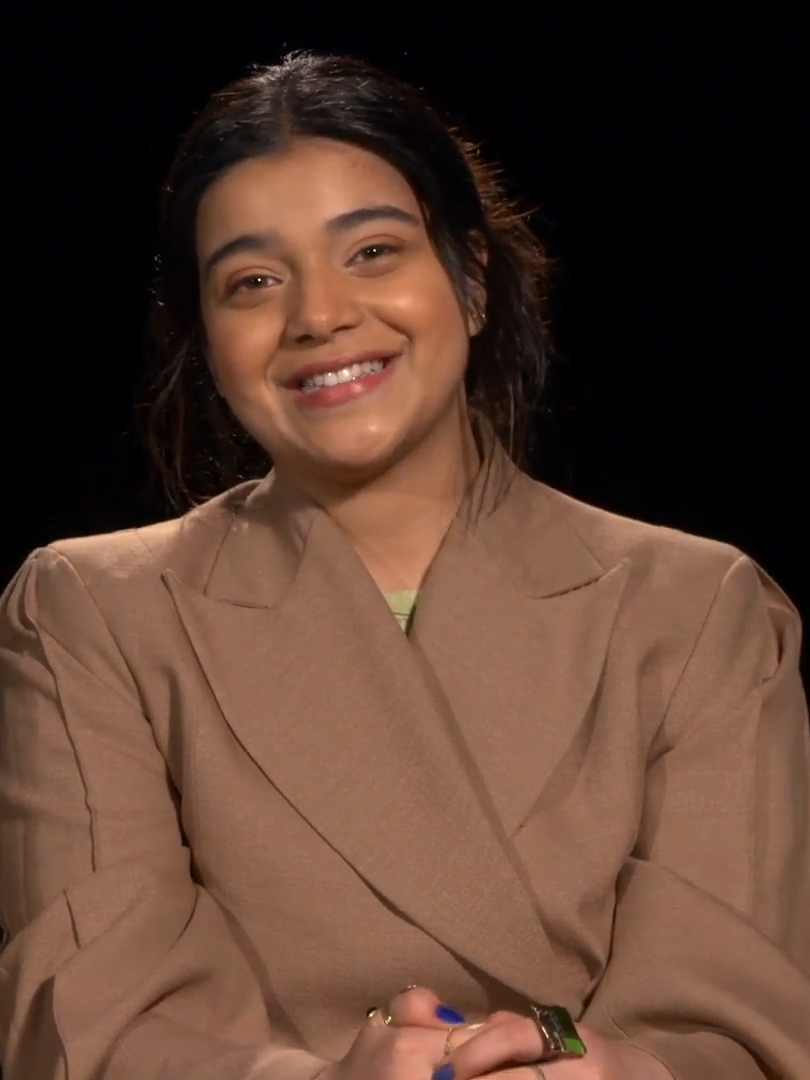
- Vellani in 2022
- Born: August 12, 2002 (age 24) (Note: While The Plain Dealer reported that Vellani was born September 3, she said in an interview with The Hollywood Reporter that she was "an August baby".); Karachi, Sindh, Pakistan
- Occupations: Actress; Comic book writer
- Years active: 2019–present

Iman Vellani (Note: Sindhi: ايمان ويلاني; /ɪˈmɑːn vəˈlɑːni/;) (born August 12, 2002) is a Pakistani-born Canadian actress and comic book writer. She starred as Kamala Khan / Ms. Marvel in the Marvel Cinematic Universe. Vellani has also appeared as Khan in other Disney productions and has co-written two Ms. Marvel limited series.

== Early life ==
Of Pakistani background, Vellani was born on 12 August 2002 in Karachi to a Sindhi family. She moved to Canada when she was a year old, and was raised as an Ismaili Muslim. She graduated from Unionville High School in Markham, Ontario. Vellani was selected as a member of the TIFF Next Wave Committee at the 2019 Toronto International Film Festival. Before being cast in Ms. Marvel at the end of her last year of high school, Vellani had planned to attend the Ontario College of Art & Design University with a focus on integrated media.

== Career ==
=== Acting ===
In September 2020, it was revealed Vellani was cast in the Marvel Cinematic Universe (MCU) as the Marvel Comics superhero Kamala Khan / Ms. Marvel for the titular Marvel Studios and Disney+'s streaming television miniseries. Vellani's aunt had forwarded her a casting call for the role; she submitted a self-tape before being asked to audition in Los Angeles; and eventually had two screen tests: in-person in February that year, and virtually over Zoom in June. Kamala Khan co-creator Sana Amanat—who served as an executive producer on the series—said Vellani revealed in her Zoom screen test that she, like Khan, is an Avengers fangirl. Amanat said, "She showed me every corner of her room, and it was covered with Avengers. Then she said, 'Oh, wait; I'm not done', opened up her closet, and there was more Marvel everywhere".

On June 8, 2022, Ms. Marvel premiered on Disney+, marking Vellani's onscreen debut. Both the series and her portrayal of the title character received widespread praise. Kathryn Porter of Paste wrote that Vellani "shines" in the role and that there was "no way to explain how great she is in this other than to say that she embodies the true spirit of Kamala Khan". Mohammad Zaheer of BBC Culture called her "an adorable bundle of charisma" in a role "tailor-made for her", while Angie Han of The Hollywood Reporter said that Vellani's full of "youthful verve and irresistible moxie" in her role. The miniseries concluded on July 13, 2022, consisting of six episodes. For her performance in the program, Vellani won a Saturn Award and received nominations for an Astra TV Award and a Critics Choice Super Award. From July 2022, Vellani appeared in Disney Wish's CGI—immersive interactive experience, Avengers: Quantum Encounter, reprising her role as Khan.

Vellani reprised her role as Kamala Khan in the MCU film The Marvels (2023) on November 10, 2023. The film serves as both a sequel to the film Captain Marvel (2019) and a continuation of Ms. Marvel. The film received polarizing reviews from critics; however, Vellani's performance was regarded as the standout amongst the cast. Amelia Emberwing of IGN declared that she "predictably steals the show", Helen O'Hara of Empire praised her humor and emotional depth with the "two older heroes." whilst Christian Holub of Entertainment Weekly noted Vellani as a "shining star" despite his lukewarm review of the film.

In September 2025, Vellani voiced an animated version of Kamala Khan for Disney+'s Marvel Zombies, which is the series adaptation of the fifth episode of the animated series, What If...?. On November 25, 2024, Vellani was cast in Shiver, her first non-Marvel acting role. By April 2025, Vellani had been cast in Mouse. In May 2026, Vellani was cast in Suffering is Optional, her first leading role in a feature film.

=== Writing ===
In August 2023, Vellani made her comic writing debut with the four-issue limited series Ms. Marvel: The New Mutant, co-written by Sabir Pirzada, who wrote the limited series Dark Web: Ms. Marvel and an episode of the Ms. Marvel show. It features Ms. Marvel exploring her newfound dual heritage as an Inhuman and a mutant and becoming a member of the X-Men. Lia Williamson of AIPT praised Vellani's handling of the character's new status quo as "[her] knowledge and love for the character allow her to make lemonade out of the lemons she's been given"; the writer opined that Vellani's "robust love and passion" for Kamala Khan "shines throughout her writing". After the conclusion of The New Mutant in November 2023, it was announced that the series would be followed by a sequel four-issue limited series titled Ms. Marvel: Mutant Menace, with Vellani and Pirzada returning as writers; the first issue was released on March 6, 2024. Alex Schlesinger, also for AIPT, praised the final issue of Mutant Menace, commenting that "Vellani is a Marvel superfan, so she knows how important Kamala's identity and power set are to her readers, and [she] and Pirzada do a wonderful job of introducing Ms. Marvel's MCU ability while keeping her polymorph powers."

Vellani wrote several more Ms. Marvel issues with Pirzada, including Ms. Marvel Annual #1 (July 2024), which is part of the connected Infinity Watch storyline, and a short story which is part of the anthology one-shot Marvel 85th Anniversary Special (August 2024) commemorating Marvel Comics' 85th anniversary.

In May 2026, it was announced that Vellani had written her first solo comic book titled Chachu, with illustrator Marianna Ignazzi and colourist Jordie Bellaire. The five-issue limited series, published by Image Comics and Tiny Onion, started on August 5, 2026. The series, set in 1979, focuses on a young Pakistani-Canadian woman as she travels to "reconnect with her estranged uncle" in California.

== Filmography ==
=== Film ===
Key
†	Denotes films that have not yet been released

Year	Title	Role	Notes	Ref.
2023	The Marvels	Kamala Khan / Ms. Marvel		
2025	Animal Farm	Puff / Tammy	Voice	
2026	Mouse	Kat		
TBA	Shiver †	TBA	Post-production	

=== Television ===
Key
†	Denotes television productions that have not yet been released

Year	Title	Role	Notes	Ref.
2022	A Fan's Guide to Ms. Marvel	Herself	Documentary short	
2022	Ms. Marvel	Kamala Khan / Ms. Marvel	Miniseries; 6 episodes	
2022	Marvel Studios: Assembled	Herself	Docu-series; special: "The Making of Ms. Marvel"	
2025	Marvel Zombies	Kamala Khan / Ms. Marvel	Voice; 4 episodes	

=== Web series ===
Year	Title	Role	Notes	Ref.
2025	Tales From Woodcreek	Una Aerie	Actual play; guest role, 2 episodes	
2026	Countdown to Avengers: Doomsday Official Podcast	Herself	Podcast; Co-host, 5 episodes	

=== Theater ===
Year	Title	Role	Notes	Ref.
2026	Spectacular	Unknown		

=== Theme park attractions ===
Year	Title	Role	Venue	Ref.
2022	Avengers: Quantum Encounter	Kamala Khan / Ms. Marvel	Disney Wish	

== Bibliography ==
- Ms. Marvel: The New Mutant #1–4 (with co-writer Sabir Pirzada and illustrators Carlos Gómez and Adam Gorham, 2023) collected as Ms. Marvel: The New Mutant (TPB, 120 pages, March 2024, ISBN 978-1-302-95490-1)
- Ms. Marvel: Mutant Menace #1–4 (with co-writer Sabir Pirzada and illustrator Scott Godlewski, 2024)
- Ms. Marvel Annual (2024) #1 (with co-writers Derek Landy, Sabir Pirzada and illustrators Giada Belviso and Sara Pichelli, July 2024)
- Marvel 85th Anniversary Special (with co-writer Sabir Pirzada and illustrator Kaare Andrews, anthology, August 2024)
- Chachu (with illustrator Marianna Ignazzi and colorist Jordie Bellaire, August 2026)

== Awards and nominations ==
Year	Award	Category	Work	Result	Ref.
2022	Saturn Awards	Best Performance by a Younger Actor (Streaming)	Ms. Marvel	Won	
2023	Critics' Choice Super Awards	Best Actress in a Superhero Series	Ms. Marvel	Nominated	
2023	Washington D.C. Area Film Critics Association	Best Youth Performance	The Marvels	Nominated	
2023	Las Vegas Film Critics Society	Best Youth in Film (Female)	The Marvels	Nominated	
2023	Indiana Film Journalists Association Awards	Breakout of the Year	The Marvels	Nominated	
2024	Astra TV Awards	Best Actress in a Streaming Limited or Anthology Series or Movie	Ms. Marvel	Nominated	
2024	Critics' Choice Super Awards	Best Actress in a Superhero Movie	The Marvels	Won	
