= Matt Lintz =

American actor (born 2001)

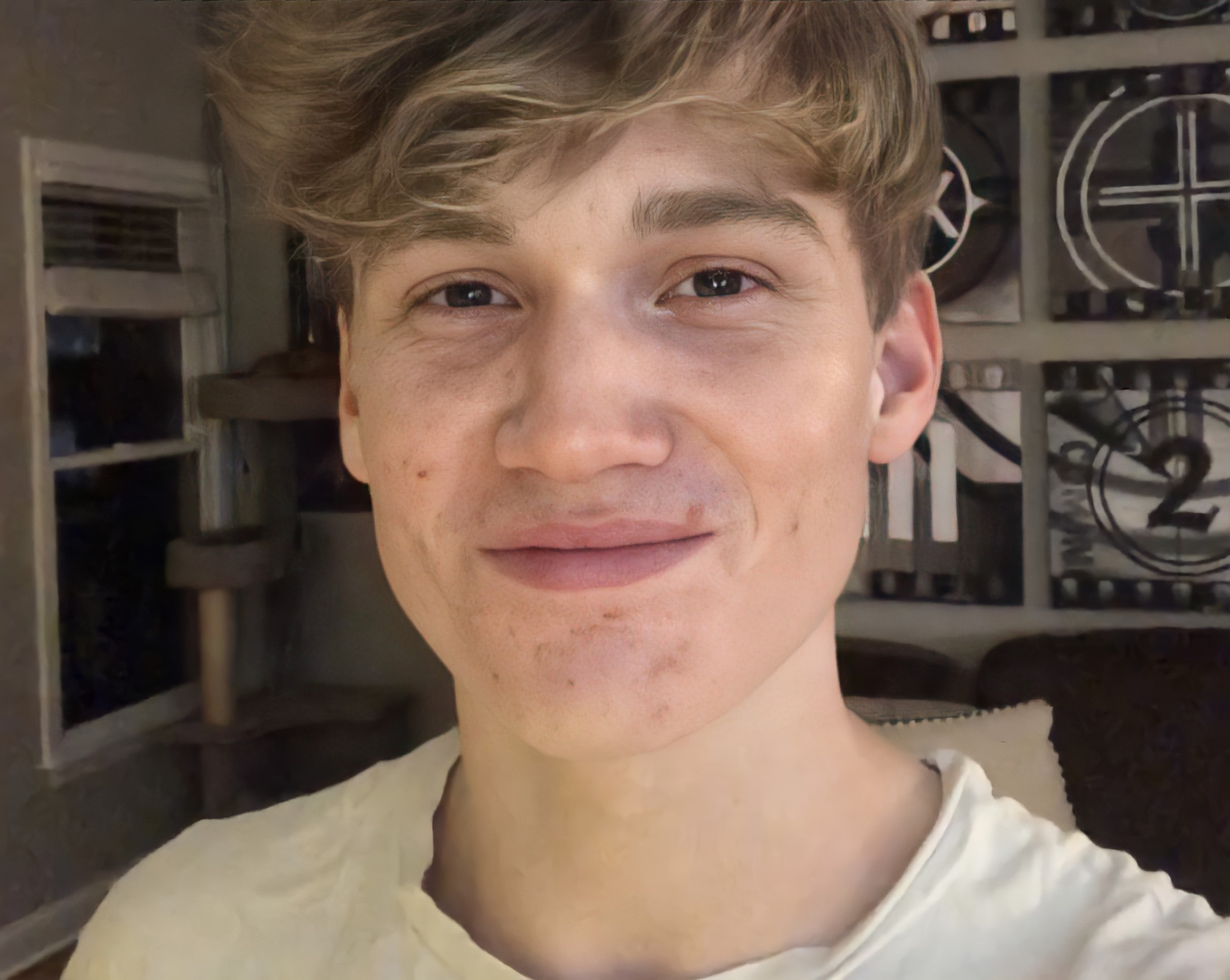
- Lintz in 2019
- Born: Matthew Lintz; May 23, 2001 (age 25); Orlando, Florida, U.S.
- Occupation: Actor
- Years active: 2009–present
- Spouse: Gracie Sapp (m. 2025)
- Relatives: Mackenzie Lintz (sister); Madison Lintz (sister)

Matthew Lintz (born May 23, 2001) is an American actor. He is best known for playing an older version of Henry in the AMC television series The Walking Dead (2018–2019) and Bruno Carrelli in the Disney+ miniseries Ms. Marvel (2022).

== Career ==
Lintz starred in commercials from the age of 4. He made his acting debut in Rob Zombie's Halloween II (2009). In 2015, Lintz auditioned for the role of Spider-Man in Captain America: Civil War. He was reportedly among the top 3 actors in talks for the role, but he eventually lost the role to Tom Holland.

In 2018, he appeared in the Primetime Emmy Award-winning show, The Alienist alongside Daniel Brühl. That same year, Lintz played the older version of Henry in the ninth season of the television series, The Walking Dead. He made a guest appearance in the tenth season. Lintz's younger brother, Macsen, played a younger version of his character while his older sister, Madison, had previously starred in the first two seasons.

In November 2020, it was revealed in set photos that Lintz would be playing Bruno Carrelli in the Disney+ series Ms. Marvel set in the Marvel Cinematic Universe (MCU). The show premiered on June 8, 2022, and ran for six episodes.

In 2022, Lintz was announced as a content creator partner for G Fuel.

== Personal life ==
In May 2024, Lintz announced on social media that he was engaged to his partner, with the two marrying a year later.

In August 2026, the couple announced that they were expecting a child.

== Filmography ==
Key
†	Denotes productions that have not yet been released

Film roles
Year	Title	Role	Notes	Refs.
2009	Halloween II	Mark		
2010	The Crazies	Distraught Son		
2010	The Way Home	Tucker Simpkins		
2011	A Cinderella Story: Once Upon a Song	Victor Van Ravensway		
2011	Level Up	Talking Boy Scout		
2012	A Smile as Big as the Moon	Shawn Kersjes		
2012	Piranha 3DD	David (Freckled Boy)		
2012	What to Expect When You're Expecting	Disruptive Kid		
2014	Kill the Messenger	Eric Webb		
2015	Pixels	Matty van Patten		
2016	The Free State of Jones	Younger Coleman Brother		
2026	Grizzly Night	Roy Ducat		

Television roles
Year	Title	Role	Notes	Ref.
2010	Memphis Beat	Scotty Groves	Episode: "Baby, Let's Play House"	
2011	Army Wives	Chris	Episode: "Farewell to Arms"	
2012	Revolution	Jack	Episode: "The Children's Crusade"	
2013	Banshee	Horace	Episode: "Wicks"	
2013	Sleepy Hollow	Thomas Grey	Episode: "John Doe"	
2018	The Alienist	Stevie Taggert	8 episodes	
2018–2019	The Walking Dead	Henry	11 episodes	
2022	Ms. Marvel	Bruno Carrelli	Main role; miniseries	
2022	Marvel Studios: Assembled	Himself	Documentary; episode: "Assembled: The Making of Ms Marvel"	
