= Sana Amanat =

American comic book editor and producer

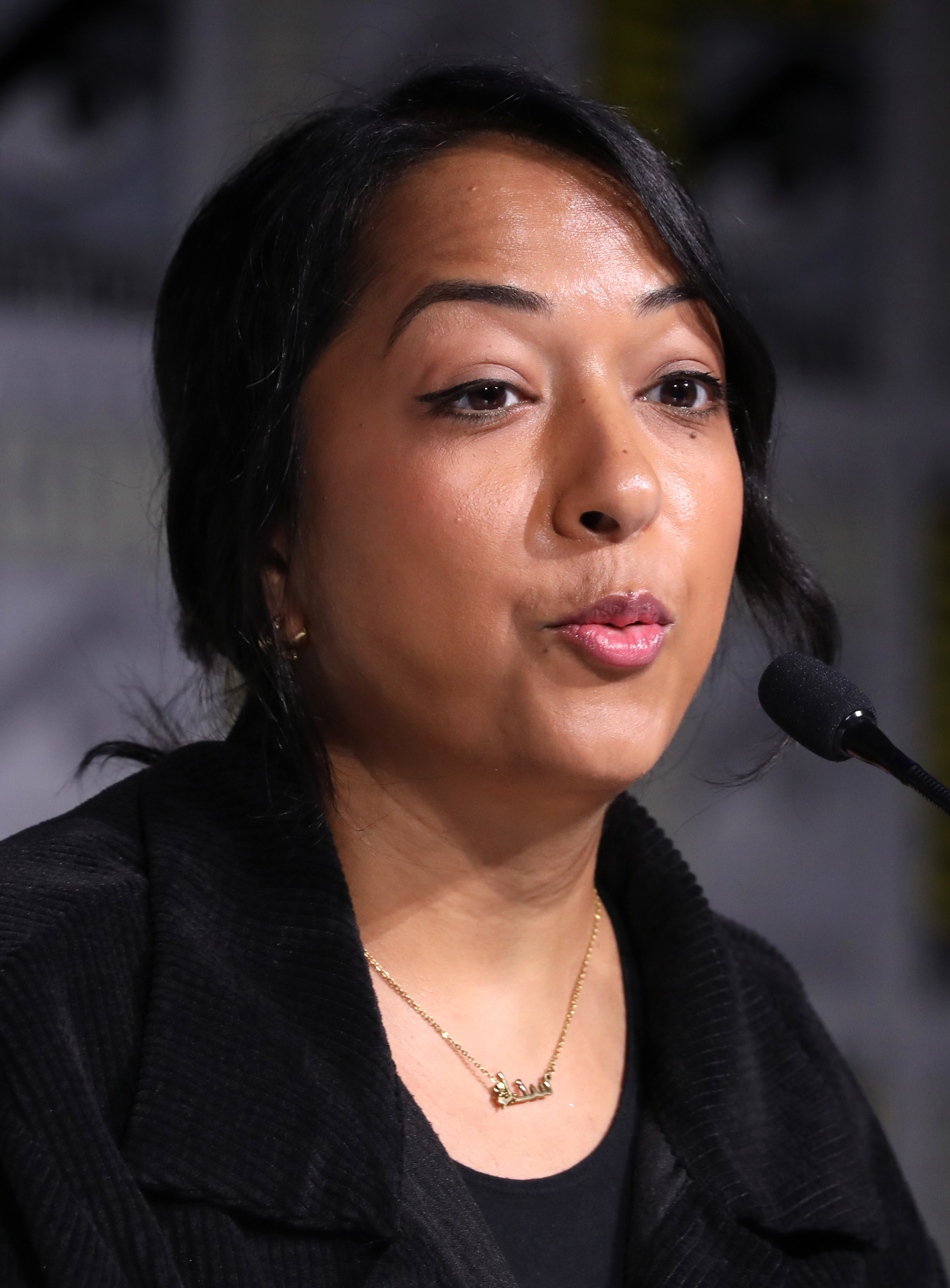
- Amanat at the Women of Marvel panel during San Diego Comic-Con 2023.
- Born: New Jersey, United States
- Areas: Editor, Writer, Executive producer
- Notable works: Ms. Marvel, Captain Marvel

Sana Amanat is an American comic book editor and an executive of production and development at Marvel Studios, having formerly been the Director of Content and Character Development at Marvel Comics. She has worked on comics such as Captain Marvel, Hawkeye, Ultimate Comics: Spider-Man, and Ms. Marvel. Amanat is known for co-creating Kamala Khan / Ms. Marvel, the first Muslim-American superhero with a solo Marvel Comics series.

== Early life and education ==
Amanat was born in New Jersey to Pakistani immigrants. Her family is Muslim. Throughout her childhood, Amanat had trouble fitting in and struggled with self-identity.

Amanat studied political science with a focus on the Middle East at Barnard College in 2004.

== Career ==
Amanat presenting Barack Obama a copy of Ms. Marvel Vol. 1 in the Blue Room of the White House during a reception for Women's History Month in 2016

After college, Amanat worked in magazine publishing for a few years. She then worked for an indie comic book company, Virgin Comics. There, Amanat learned about graphic storytelling. Two years later, the company went out of business.

Amanat's next career move was to join Marvel Comics in 2009. According to Amanat, an executive at Marvel approached her for the job because she was different from their average employee. She said that the executive told her she had "something different to offer than the regular fanboy who has read comics since he was a kid. She has a different voice, and they need her voice in order to change Marvel." Amanat runs the annual Women of Marvel panel at Comic Con and does work to make Marvel characters more diverse. Since 2014, Amanat has also co-hosted the Women of Marvel podcast; by 2020, the podcast had released over 200 episodes.

At TEDxTeen 2014, Amanat gave a talk titled "Myths, Misfits & Masks" where she spoke on "how societal constructs and stereotype affect self-image and worth and how comic book storytelling in particular helps manage the expectations of others through a positive lens".

In 2014, she co-created Marvel's first solo series to feature a female Muslim superhero, the relaunched Ms. Marvel comic; the series was headlined by a new character, Kamala Khan. The conception of Khan came about during a conversation between Amanat and Marvel editor Stephen Wacker. Amanat said, "I was telling him some crazy anecdote about my childhood, growing up as a Muslim American. He found it hilarious." The pair then told G. Willow Wilson about the concept and Wilson became eager to jump aboard the project. Amanat said that the series came from a "desire to explore the Muslim-American diaspora from an authentic perspective." Ms. Marvel Volume 1: No Normal was the best-selling graphic novel in October 2014 and it won the Hugo Award for Best Graphic Story in 2015. Several volumes of the series have been on The New York Times Best Seller list of paperback graphic books. (Note: By November 2014, Ms. Marvel Volume 1: No Normal reached No. 2 on The New York Times Best Seller list of paperback graphic books. In April 2015, Ms. Marvel Volume 2: Generation Why debuted at #4 on The New York Times Best Seller list of paperback graphic books. In July 2015, Ms. Marvel Volume 3: Crushed debuted at #3 on The New York Times Best Seller list of paperback graphic books. In July 2016, Ms. Marvel Volume 5: Super Famous debuted at #3 on The New York Times Best Seller list of paperback graphic books.) As of August 2018, Ms. Marvel has sold half a million trade paperbacks, not including digital sales. Ms. Marvel has also sold well digitally, and has at times been Marvel's top digital seller overall.

Amanat has been the Director of Content and Character Development at Marvel Comics since February 2015. Vox called her the "Shonda Rhimes of Marvel comics" in 2015. Amanat was co-executive producer on the animated television film Marvel Rising: Secret Warriors (2018) and the subsequent animated specials in the Marvel Rising series. She was also co-executive producer on the unscripted documentary series Marvel's Hero Project (2019). Amanat joined Marvel Studios by mid-2019, where she is an executive of production and development. She is as an executive producer on Marvel Studios' Ms. Marvel (2022), a Disney+ television adaptation based on the comic series of the same name; she cameos in the third episode of the series.

== Inspiration ==
In her Ted Talk, Amanat stated that "the big idea behind Ms. Marvel [was] very much about minority representation, the bigger idea was about finding your authentic self". While creating the comic, she drew on her own experience as the child of Pakistani immigrants in the New Jersey suburbs in hopes that the next generation will not experience identity rejection as she did through a relatable superhero.

== Comics ==
- True Believers: Thanos Rising (2018)
- Generations: Ms. Marvel and Ms. Marvel (2017)
- The Mighty Captain Marvel (2017)
- Hawkeye (2016–2018)
- All-New Hawkeye (2015–2016)
- Captain Marvel & The Carol Corps (2015–present)
- Daredevil (2015–present)
- Giant-Size Little Marvel: AVX (2015–present)
- Max Ride: First Flight (2015–present)
- Ms. Marvel vol. 4 #1–38 (November 2015–March 2019)
  - Volume 5: Super Famous (tpb, 136 pages, 2016, ISBN 0-7851-9611-0)
    - "Super Famous" (with G. Willow Wilson, Adrian Alphona and Takeshi Miyazawa, in #1–3, 2015–2016)
    - "Army of One" (with G. Willow Wilson and Nico Leon, in #4–6, 2016)
    - "The Road to War" (with G. Willow Wilson and Adrian Alphona, in #7, 2016)
    - "Civil War II" (with G. Willow Wilson, Adrian Alphona and Takeshi Miyazawa, in #8-11, 2016)
    - "The Road to War" (with G. Willow Wilson and Mirka Andolfo, in #12, 2016)
    - "Election Day" (with G. Willow Wilson and Mirka Andolfo, in #13, 2016)
    - "Damage Per Second" (with G. Willow Wilson, Takeshi Miyazawa, and Nelson Blake II, in #14-17, 2017)
    - "Meanwhile in Wakanda" (with G. Willow Wilson and Francesco Gaston, in #18, 2017)
    - "Mecca" (with G. Willow Wilson, Marco Failla, Nelson Blake II, and Valerio Schiti, in #19-22, 2017)
    - "Northeast Corridor" (with G. Willow Wilson, Diego Olortegui, and Valerio Schiti, in #23-24, 2017)
- Ms. Marvel vol. 3 #1–19 (with G. Willow Wilson and Adrian Alphona, February 2014–October 2015)
  - Volume 1: No Normal (tpb, 120 pages, 2014, ISBN 0-7851-9021-X) collects:
    - "Garden State of Mind" (with G. Willow Wilson and Adrian Alphona, in All-New Marvel NOW! Point One #1.NOW, 2014)
    - "Meta Morphosis" (with G. Willow Wilson and Adrian Alphona, in #1, 2014)
    - "All Mankind" (with G. Willow Wilson and Adrian Alphona, in #2, 2014)
    - "Side Entrance" (with G. Willow Wilson and Adrian Alphona, in #3, 2014)
    - "Past Curfew" (with G. Willow Wilson and Adrian Alphona, in #4, 2014)
    - "Urban Legend" (with G. Willow Wilson and Adrian Alphona, in #5, 2014)
  - Volume 2: Generation Why (tpb, 136 pages, 2015, ISBN 0-7851-9022-8) collects:
    - "Healing Factor" (with Jake Wyatt, in #6–7, 2014)
    - "Generation Why" (with G. Willow Wilson and Adrian Alphona, in #8–11, 2014–2015)
  - Volume 3: Crushed (tpb, 112 pages, 2015, ISBN 0-7851-9227-1) collects:
    - "Loki in Love" (with G. Willow Wilson and Elmo Bondoc, in #12, 2015)
    - "Crushed" (with G. Willow Wilson and Takeshi Miyazawa, in #13–15, 2015)
  - Volume 4: Last Days (tpb, 120 pages, 2015, ISBN 0-7851-9736-2) collects:
    - "Last Days" (with G. Willow Wilson and Adrian Alphona, in #16–19, 2015)
- Ultimate Spider-Man Infinite Digital Comic (2015–present)
- All-New Hawkeye (2015)
- Elektra (2014–present)
- Rocket Raccoon (2014–present)
- Daredevil (2014–2015)
- Hawkeye (2012–2015)
- Superior Carnage (2013–2014)

== Filmography ==
| Year | Title | Role | Notes |
|---|---|---|---|
| 2018 | Marvel Rising: Secret Warriors | Co-executive producer | Television movie |
| 2019 | Marvel Rising: Chasing Ghosts | Co-executive producer | Television special |
| 2019 | Marvel Rising: Heart of Iron | Co-executive producer | Television special |
| 2019 | Marvel Rising: Battle of the Bands | Co-executive producer | Television special |
| 2019 | Marvel Rising: Operation Shuri | Co-executive producer | Television special |
| 2019 | Marvel's Hero Project | Executive producer | 20 episodes |
| 2019 | Marvel Rising: Playing with Fire | Co-executive producer | Television special |
| 2022 | Ms. Marvel | Executive producer Actor | 6 episodes Cameo; episode: "Destined" |
| 2025-present | Daredevil: Born Again | Executive producer | 17 episodes |
| 2026 | The Punisher: One Last Kill | Executive producer | Post-production |

== See also ==
- List of female comics creators
