= Kamala (name) =

- Pronunciation: /ˈkɑːmələ/ Hindi: [ˈkəməlaː]
- Gender: Feminine
- Language: Hindi, English

Origin
- Origin: Sanskrit: कमला, romanized: kamalā
- Meaning: 'lotus'

Other names
- Related names: Kamal

Kamala is a Sanskrit word meaning 'lotus'. It is used as a feminine given name in Indian culture, predominantly by Hindu families, as it is one of the names of the goddess Lakshmi, who appears from the centre of a lotus.

The masculine counterpart Kamal is a given name for Indian boys.

== People ==
=== First name ===
- Kamala Bahuguna (1923–2001), Indian politician
- Kamala Balakrishnan (1930–2018), Indian immunologist
- Kamala Bhattacharya (1945–1961), Indian martyr
- Kamala Bose (1947–2012), Indian classical vocalist
- Kamala Chakravarty (born 1928), Indian classical musician and dancer
- Kamala Chandrakirana, Indonesian women's rights activist
- Kamala Devi (actress) (1933–2010), Indian actress
- Kamala Devi (footballer) (born 1992), Indian footballer
- Kamala Hampana (1935–2024), Indian writer
- Kamala Harris (born 1964), Vice President of the United States between 2021 and 2025, former California attorney and senator
- Kamala Hayman, New Zealand newspaper journalist
- Kamala Ibrahim Ishaq, Sudanese artist
- Kamala Kanta Kalita (born 1957), Indian politician
- Kamala Kamesh (born 1952), Indian actress
- Kamala Kumari Karredula, Indian politician
- Kamala Krishnaswamy, Indian nutritionist
- Kamala Kotnis, Indian actress
- Kamala Shirin Lakhdhir, American diplomat, ambassador to Malaysia
- Kamala Laxman (died 2015), Indian author of children's books
- Kamala Lopez, American filmmaker
- Kamala Markandaya (1924–2004), Indian novelist and journalist
- Kamala Nehru (1899–1936), wife of Indian Prime Minister Jawahar Lal Nehru
- Kamala Nimbkar (1900–1979), American-born occupational therapist in India
- Kamala Parks, American drummer, songwriter
- Kamala Pujari (died 2024), Indian organic agriculture promoter
- Kamala Ranathunga (born 1937), Sri Lankan politician
- Kamala Rani Balakrishnan, Singaporean criminal
- Kamala Roka, Nepali politician
- Kamala Saikhom, Indian actress
- Kamala Sankaran, Indian academic administrator
- Kamala Sankrityayan (1920–2009), Indian writer
- Kamala Selvaraj, Indian obstetrician and gynecologist
- Kamala Shankar, Indian slide guitar player
- Kamala Sinha (1932–2014), Indian politician
- Kamala Sohonie (1912–1998), Indian biochemist
- Kamala Surayya (1934–2009), Indian short story writer and autobiographer
- Kamala Todd, Canadian filmmaker

=== Surname ===
- Diodorus Kamala (1968–2024), Tanzanian politician
- Kumari Kamala (1934–2025), Indian classical dancer

== Fictional characters ==
- Kamala, in the novel Siddhartha by Hermann Hesse
- Kamala, in "The Perfect Mate", an episode of Star Trek: The Next Generation
- Kamala, a main character in the comedy-drama series Never Have I Ever
- Kamala Khan (Ms. Marvel), a Pakistani-American superhero in Marvel Comics

== Other ==
- Kamala (elephant) (c. 1975 — 2024), an Asian elephant who lived at Calgary Zoo and the National Zoological Park

== See also ==
- Kamela § People with the surname Kamela
- Komala § People with the name Komala
- Kamla (name), given name and surname
