= Kamla =

Kamla may refer to:

== Places ==
- Kamla Nagar, neighbourhood of Delhi, in the North Delhi district of Delhi, India
- Kamla Nehru Institute of Technology (KNIT), a prominent state government funded engineering college in Uttar Pradesh, India
- Kamla (Kwakwaka'wakw village), an indigenous village in, British Columbia, Canada

== Other ==
- Kamla (film), 1984 Hindi film
- Kamla (name), given name and surname, includes a list of people with the name
- Kamla (TV series), a 2015 Indian Marathi-language soap opera

== See also ==
- Kamala (disambiguation)
- Kamela (disambiguation)
- Kalla (disambiguation)
