= Kamaal =

Kamaal is a given name. Notable people with this name include:

- Kamaal Amrohi (1918–1993), Indian film director and screenwriter
- Kamaal Fareed or Q-Tip (musician) (born 1970), American rapper, record producer, singer, actor and DJ
- Kamaal R. Khan, Indian film actor, producer and writer
- Kamaal Williams (born 1989), British musician and record producer

== See also ==
- Kamahl
- Kamal (disambiguation)
- Kamala (disambiguation)
- Kamale
- Kammal
