= Komal =

Komal may refer to:

== Given name ==
- Poonam Sinha, also known as Komal, Indian actress
- Komal Aziz Khan, Pakistani television actress and model
- Komal Chautala, a fictional hockey player played by Chitrashi Rawat in the 2007 Indian film Chak De India
- Komal Jha, Indian movie actor
- Komal Kothari, Indian folklorist and ethnomusicologist
- Komal Kumar, Indian actor in the Kannada film industry
- Komal Nahta, Indian film trade analyst
- Komal Rajya Laxmi Devi Shah, queen of Nepal
- Komal Rizvi, Pakistani actress, singer, songwriter, and television host
- Komal Shah (disambiguation)
  - Komal Shah (art collector), art collector, philanthropist, computer engineer, and businessperson in Silicon Valley
- Komal Sharma, Indian actor
- Komal Swaminathan, Indian Tamil theater personality, film director and journalist
- Komal Thatal (born 1991), Indian footballer
- Poonam Sinha, Indian Bollywood actress known by her screen name Komal
- Komal Krupakupareshwarar Temple, a Shiva temple in Mayiladuthurai district

== Last name ==
- Jeffery Komal, Papua New Guinean politician
- Balraj Komal, Indian poet and writer
- Gyani Kartar Singh Komal, Indian educator

== Other ==
- Komala (disambiguation)
- KöMaL, Hungarian mathematics and physics journal
