= Drip Capital =

Digital trade finance company

- Website type: Private
- Founded: 2016
- Headquarters: Palo Alto, California
- Founders: Pushkar Mukewar; Neil Kothari
- Key people: Pushkar Mukewar (CEO)
- Industry: Fintech, International Trade
- Employees: 300+

Drip Capital (DRIP/c) is a digital trade finance and B2B commerce company based in Palo Alto, California. The company offers working capital to small and medium sized companies engaged in cross-border trade in India, Mexico and the United States using technology and data analytics. It also operates a B2B commerce platform that connects global buyers and suppliers. It's investors include Accel, Sequoia, Wing VC, Y Combinator, and Sumitomo Mitsui Banking Corporation, alongside debt partners such as Barclays, IFC (World Bank Group), and TD Bank.

== History ==
The company was founded in November 2016 by Wharton School alums Pushkar Mukewar and Neil Kothari. Using their prior experience in finance and technology, they set up the company to bridge the trade finance gap for SME export-import worldwide.

Drip Capital later launched its Indian subsidiary, Drip Capital Services India LLP to begin operations in the country. In 2018, Drip introduced its supplier financing solutions and domestic factoring services for small businesses in Mexico.

== Products and services ==
Drip Capital has two core offerings: trade finance and trade commerce.

Under trade finance, Drip Capital offers digital, collateral-free finance to small and medium-sized businesses participating in international trade. Using electronic data and automated risk assessment, the company evaluates counterparties and transactions to extend credit limits of up to US$3 million, depending on the size of the business and its requirement.

In the United States, Drip Capital operates supply chain financing programs for buyers, enabling domestic and international suppliers to receive accelerated payments. In India, the company provides receivables financing for exporters as well as supply chain financing solutions for domestic buyers and their supplier networks.

Its trade commerce offering is a B2B commerce platform that connects global buyers and suppliers to facilitate cross-border sourcing. The platform enables businesses to identify trade partners, manage transactions, and participate in global supply chains.

Drip Capital has been extensively engaging with various trade associations and export promotion councils like FIEO, EEPC, CHEMEXCIL, and PLEXCONCIL to educate exporters about its product offerings. In November 2021, Drip Capital announced two new partnerships, a collaboration with CARGOES Finance by DP World and another with TradeLens, a blockchain enabled digital platform, to enable access to working capital for emerging market small and medium-sized businesses.

== Growth and Funding ==
Drip Capital has raised nearly $640 million in venture capital and debt funding since it started operations. The company is backed by prominent equity investors, including, Accel, Wing, Transpose Platform, Peak XV Partners (Sequoia India), Sumitomo Mitsui Banking Corporation (SMBC), GMO Payment Gateway, and Y-Combinator. On the debt side, Drip partners with leading financial institutions including IFC, Barclays and East West bank. In 2025, the company received a $50 million credit facility, with an additional $25 million accordion option from TD Bank to accelerate North American expansion. As of October 2025, it has funded more than $8 billion of trade transactions.

In September 2020, Drip Capital was named to the CB Insights Fintech 250 list. In March 2022, it was featured in Y Combinator's Top Companies list. Later that year, Drip Capital was selected to the Red Herring Global Top 100 list. In 2025, the company was featured in the ASK Private Wealth Hurun India Unicorn and Future Unicorn Report 2025 as one of India's "leading soonicorns." The company has also been listed as one of the Top 10 companies list of Forbes India and D Globalist's DGEMS Select 200 list.

== Locations ==
Drip's corporate headquarters are Palo Alto, California. It also has offices in Mumbai, India and Mexico City, Mexico.
