= Kamali =

Kamali (Persian: کمالی), meaning "perfection" or "integrity", may refer to:

== People ==
- Chemena Kamali, German fashion designer and creative director of Chloe.
- Hossein Kamali (born 1953), Iranian politician
- Mohammad Hashim Kamali (born 1944), Afghan Islamic scholar and former law professor
- Norma Kamali (born 1945), American fashion designer
- Saba Kamali (born 1976), Iranian actress
- Shahriar Kamali (born 1972), Iranian bodybuilder

== Places ==
- Kamali, Estonia, a village
- Kamali, Bushehr, Iran, a village
- Kamali, Fars, Iran, a village
- Kamali Rural District, Iran, an administrative division

== Other uses ==
- Kamali (TV series), a 2018 Indian Kannada-language soap opera
- Kamali Tenywa, a character in the Ugandan television series Beneath The Lies

== See also ==
- Al Kamali, a surname
- Kamal (disambiguation)
- Kamala (disambiguation)
- Kamalia (disambiguation)
- Kamli (disambiguation)
