= Retell AI =

American artificial intelligence company

- Type: Private
- Industry: Artificial intelligence
- Founded: 2023; 3 years ago
- Founders: Bing Wu, Todd Li, Evie Wang, Weijia Yu, and Zexia Zhang
- Headquarters: Redwood City, California, United States
- Key people: Bing Wu (CEO)
- Products: Voice agent platform, Retell Assure, Conductor
- Website: www.retellai.com

Retell AI is an American artificial intelligence company based in Redwood City, California. It develops software for creating AI-based voice agents that can make and receive telephone calls.

== History ==
Retell AI was founded in 2023 by Bing Wu, Todd Li, Evie Wang, Weijia Yu, and Zexia Zhang. The company participated in Y Combinator's Winter 2024 batch and launched its product in February 2024.

In May 2024, Retell AI raised $4.53 million. In August, Retell AI announced a $4.6 million seed funding round led by Alt Capital, with participation from Y Combinator. In December 2025, the company achieved profitability.

In February 2026, G2 included Retell AI among the products in its 2026 Best Software Awards. In March of the same year, Retell AI was included in the early-stage category of Wing Venture Capital's Enterprise Tech 30 list.

The company's annualized revenue was about $60 million in April 2026, compared with about $45 million at the end of 2025, and rated of more than $100 million in November 2026.

== Products ==
Retell AI's main product is a platform for creating AI voice agents. The platform uses large language models together with speech-to-text and text-to-speech systems. Its pricing is based on usage, with charges calculated partly by the length of calls and by the use of third-party services.

In December 2025, the company introduced Voice AI's First Automated QA Solution, a tool for reviewing calls handled by AI agents. In June 2026, the company launched Conductor, a tool for testing and reviewing voice agents.
