= Al Kamali =

Al Kamali or Al-Kamali is a surname. Notable people with the surname include:

- Abdulla Al Kamali (born 1989), Emirati footballer
- Hamdan Al-Kamali (born 1989), Emirati footballer
- Hamid Al Kamali (born 1989), Emirati footballer
- Reem al-Kamali (born 1972), Emirati writer

== See also ==
- Kamali (disambiguation)
