= Komla =

Komla is a given name. Notable people with the name include:

- Komla Dumor (1972–2014), Ghanaian journalist
- Komla Agbeli Gbedemah (1913–1998), Ghanaian politician

== See also ==
- Kamla (name), given name and surname
- Komala § People with the name Komala
