= Tamil Nadu National Law University =

Law school in India

- Motto: Virtue Triumphs
- Type: National Law University
- Established: 2012; 14 years ago
- Affiliations: UGC, BCI
- Chancellor: Chief Justice of Madras High Court
- Vice-Chancellor: Dr. V. Nagaraj
- Location: Tiruchirappalli 620009, Tamil Nadu, India; 10.7467°N 78.5988°E
- Campus: 25 acres; Rural
- Website: www.tnnlu.ac.in

Tamil Nadu National Law University (TNNLU), formerly Tamil Nadu National Law School (TNNLS), is a National Law University in Tiruchirappalli, Tamil Nadu, India.

TNNLU is on the University Grants Commission (UGC)'s approved list of universities; the university is also included under section 12(B) of the UGC Act 1956, allowing TNNLU to apply for grants from the UGC and other central government agencies. The Bar Council of India also recognizes TNNLU as a Center for Legal Education.

TNNLU is a member of the Association of Indian Universities and the Shastri Indo-Canadian Institute, and is a permanent member of the Indian Academy of Social Science. It is also an empanelled institution with the Competition Commission of India.

As of 2025, TNNLU had approximately 30 faculty members, with a student-to-faculty ratio of 20:1.

== History ==
TNNLU was established on 23 February 2012 by the Government of Tamil Nadu through the Tamil Nadu National Law School Act, 2012 (Act No. 9 of 2012) with an initial allocation of ₹100 crore (equivalent to ₹189 crore or US$20 million in 2023). The Act was amended in 2018, replacing the word 'School' with 'University'. Former Chief Minister Jayaram Jayalalithaa laid the foundation stone on 13 February 2012, with construction handled by the Public Works Department at a cost of ₹79 crore (US$8.2 million). The university commenced academic operations in the 2013–2014 academic year, initially admitting 100 students to its B.A LL.B. (Honours) programme.

=== Leadership ===
In the act establishing the school, the chief justice of the Madras High Court was given the position of chancellor, and "Minister in-charge of the portfolio of law in the State" became the pro-chancellor. The chancellor had the power to appoint the vice-chancellor from a selection of three candidates picked by a separate committee; this person can hold the position of vice-chancellor for at most six years (3 years, with the option of a 3 year extension).

At inauguration, the chancellor was Chief Justice Rajesh Kumar Agrawal, with Professor N. Murugavel as vice-chancellor. In June 2015, Murugavel resigned from his post due to lack of executive office support; he was temporarily replaced by former school registrar V. Arun Roy. In December 2016, Roy was replaced by Professor Kamala Sankaran, who in turn was replaced by Professor VS Elizabeth in December 2019. As of March 2026, the current chancellor, pro-chancellor and vice-chancellor are Chief Justice Sushrut Arvind Dharmadhikari, Minister for Water Resources Durai Murugan, and Professor V. Nagaraj, respectively.

== Location ==
TNNLU is located on a 25-acre campus in the Tiruchirappalli, Tamil Nadu. The campus includes a legal history museum, administrative, undergraduate and postgraduate academic buildings, an auditorium, a training center, 2 multi-purpose halls, 2 hostels, 3 residential bungalows, and 6 apartment complexes.

== Programmes ==
Like all National Law Universities, admissions to TNNLU are based on the Common Law Admission Test (CLAT).

=== Ph.D. in Law ===
The Ph.D in Law programme is designed for post-graduate students who wish to advance their studies through research in law.
