= 4 Kids Walk Into a Bank =

2016–2017 comic book limited series

- Cover of paperback collected edition

Publication information
- Publisher: Black Mask Studios
- Format: Limited series
- Genre: Crime
- Publication date: 2016–2017
- No. of issues: 5

Creative team
- Written by: Matthew Rosenberg
- Artist: Tyler Boss
- Letterer: Thomas Mauer

Collected editions
- Hardcover: ISBN 978-1-62875-189-5
- Paperback: ISBN 978-1-62875-188-8
- Local Comic Store Day limited edition: ISBN 978-1-62875-190-1

4 Kids Walk Into a Bank is a limited series crime comic written by Matthew Rosenberg, illustrated by Tyler Boss, and lettered by Thomas Mauer. It was published in five issues from 2016–2017 by Black Mask Studios, with a collected edition graphic novel published in 2017. The novel is a crime story about a young girl who decides to rob a bank with her friends after overhearing her father plan a heist with his associates. It received generally positive reviews. 4 Kids Walk Into a Bank is being adapted into a film of the same name, scheduled to be released in 2027.

== Plot ==
The series follows the 12-year-old Paige Turner and her friends Berger, Walter, and Stretch. One evening four thugs, Vernon, Hayes, Silk, and Skinhead Mike, barge into her home but are driven away by her father. Curious, the children investigate the thugs and learn that they are planning to rob a bank with her father's help. Her father agrees, as he desperately needs the money and owes the thugs for their previous help keeping him out of jail.

Paige decides to undermine the thugs by robbing the bank herself, with the help of her friends. Their interference is detected by Vernon and his men, who intimidate Berger, Walter, and Stretch into abandoning the plans. Paige discovers that her father and the men are planning to flee under new identities after the robbery and take her with them. She uses this information to persuade her friends to helping her and avoid them being separated.

The children begin their bank robbery, only for it to fail miserably. Police arrive and they learn that the thugs had already robbed another bank without the help of Paige's father and skipped town. Upset, Berger attacks a police officer and is shot in the stomach. The children attempt to flee in a van with the wounded Berger. They are caught and Paige emerges begging for them to help Berger, whose wound worsens. The story then skips forward several years. An older Mr. Turner and the now adult Stretch and Walter are waiting outside of a prison, Berger conspicuously absent. Paige emerges and joyfully reunites with her father.

== Release ==
Black Mask Studios released the first issue of 4 Kids Walk Into a Bank on April 27, 2016; by April 22, it had sold out a 31,000 print run by Diamond Comic Distributors. The comic ran as a limited series of five issues; the final issue and a collected edition graphic novel were released in 2017.

== Reception ==
4 Kids Walk Into a Bank received generally positive reviews, and was ranked number 32 out of the top 100 comics of the 2010s by Den of Geek.

== Adaptation ==
In 2020, Matthew Rosenberg was selected to adapt 4 Kids Walk Into a Bank into a screenplay. Upon completion of the screenplay, the film entered production in 2024, with Frankie Shaw in her feature-length directorial debut and revising the screenplay, and Robert Richardson as cinematographer. The film is being produced and financed by Picturestart, Point Grey Pictures, Black Mask Studios, and Miramax. The cast includes Liam Neeson, Talia Ryder, Whitney Peak, Jack Dylan Grazer, Deacon Phillipe, and Teresa Palmer,

Filming began in December 2024 in Limerick, Ireland, with parts of the city set to appear as the United States in the 1990s. Additional filming took place in Cratloe Woods, County Clare, and at Castletroy College. Amazon MGM Studios has domestic distribution rights to the film under its Orion Pictures label, and FilmNation Entertainment is conducting international sales. The film was initially set for release in 2026, but was postponed to an unspecified 2027 release date.
