= Kamalia (disambiguation) =

Kamalia is a city in Toba Tek Singh District, Punjab, Pakistan.

Kamalia may also refer to:

- Kamalia Tehsil, a tehsil in Toba Tek Singh District, Punjab, Pakistan
- Kamalia railway station, Kamalia, Toba Tek Singh District, Punjab, Pakistan
- Kamalia Ahir, a clan of the Ahir people of Gujarat, India
- Kamalia Kathi, a clan of the Kathi people of Gujarat, India

== See also ==
- Kamali (disambiguation)
- Kamal (disambiguation)
- Kamala (disambiguation)
- Kamli (disambiguation)
