= Photonic molecule =

Theoretical natural state of matter

Photonic molecules are a form of matter in which photons bind together to form "molecules". They were first predicted in 2007. Photonic molecules are formed when individual (massless) photons "interact with each other so strongly that they act as though they have mass". Researchers drew analogies between the phenomenon and the fictional "lightsaber" from Star Wars.

== Construction ==
Gaseous rubidium atoms were pumped into a vacuum chamber. The cloud was cooled using lasers to just a few degrees above absolute zero. Using weak laser pulses, small numbers of photons were fired into the cloud.

As the photons entered the cloud, their energy excited atoms along their path, causing them to lose speed. Inside the cloud medium, the photons dispersively coupled to strongly interacting atoms in highly excited Rydberg states. This caused the photons to behave as massive particles with strong mutual attraction (photon molecules). Eventually the photons exited the cloud together as normal photons (often entangled in pairs).

The effect is caused by a so-called Rydberg blockade, which, in the presence of one excited atom, prevents nearby atoms from being excited to the same degree. In this case, as two photons enter the atomic cloud, the first excites an atom, annihilating itself in the interaction, but the transmitted energy must move forward inside the excited atom before the second photon can excite nearby atoms. In effect the two photons push and pull each other through the cloud as their energy is passed from one atom to the next, forcing them to interact. This photonic interaction is mediated by the electromagnetic interaction between photons and atoms.

== Possible applications ==
The interaction of the photons suggests that the effect could be employed to build a system that can preserve quantum information, and process it using quantum logic operations. The system could also be useful in classical computing, given the much lower power required to manipulate photons than electrons. It may be possible to arrange the photonic molecules in such a way within the medium that they form larger two-dimensional structures (similar to drawings).

== See also ==
- Solid light
