= Secret Warriors (2017 series) =

2017 comic book series

Publication information
- Publisher: Marvel Comics
- Schedule: Monthly
- Format: Ongoing
- Genre: Superhero
- Publication date: May 2017 – January 2018
- No. of issues: 12
- Main characters: Daisy Johnson; Ms. Marvel (Kamala Khan); Moon Girl; Devil Dinosaur; Inferno (Dante Pertuz); Karnak; Magik (Illyana Rasputin)

Creative team
- Written by: Matthew Rosenberg
- Artist: Javier Garron
- Penciller: Javier Garron
- Inker: Javier Garron
- Letterer: Clayton Cowles
- Colorist: Israel Silva

Secret Warriors is a 2017 comic book series which focused on a new incarnation of the Secret Warriors superhero team. The team is composed of "Inhumans who are a little outside traditional Inhuman culture". It's the second series of the title Secret Warriors to be published by Marvel Comics. It ran for twelve issues from May 2017 to January 2018.

== Publication history ==
In November 2016, Marvel announced a new incarnation of the Secret Warriors would debut in May 2017 in a series by writer Matthew Rosenberg and artist Javier Garron. The team, formed in the wake of the "Inhumans vs X-Men" storyline, would include Quake, Ms. Marvel, Karnak, Moon Girl, and Devil Dinosaur. Rosenberg stated that there is some conflict and friction amongst the team members explaining, "Ms. Marvel and Quake are really fighting for the soul of the team in a lot of ways, while Moon Girl will continue to really do her own thing. They will all be tested and challenged, they are superheroes after all, but they are going to do things their way." The first five issues of the series takes place and deals with the crossover comic Secret Empire. The following issue tackles the aftermath of the events of that series.

The "Versus Mister Sinister" story arc, which began with issue #8, was part of the Marvel Legacy relaunch. Post-Secret Empire, artist Javier Garron stated that the Secret Warriors are "recovering from the wounds that fight left. The team gathered for a specific menace, but no action goes without consequence, and the aftermath is another fight in itself. [...] They are here to protect and defend Inhumans now that their position as a species and civilization is in danger in the Marvel Universe, and even more now that they don't have a real leadership with the royal family gone into space". Rosenberg highlighted that initially the team is broken up and no one wants anything to do with Karnak so "coming out of Secret Empire puts the Warriors in an interesting place. With no Royal family, no Terrigen Mist, the future of the Inhuman race is very much in question. And Sinister loves a genetic crisis as much as the next insane geneticist. [...] I knew early on that we wanted the book to be about the future of the Inhuman race, but from a more personal place. We really wanted to show what it was like to be the last of a once great people, the final hope".

In January 2018, Secret Warriors was cancelled after twelve issues.

== Plot ==
The series begins with Daisy Johnson assembling the young characters to create a new team to battle the hordes of Hydra.

== Characters ==
Daisy Johnson
Codename: Quake, an agent of S.H.I.E.L.D. who is also an Inhuman with the ability to generate powerful waves of vibrations that resemble earthquakes.
Kamala Khan
Codename: Ms. Marvel, a teenage Inhuman with shapeshifting abilities. Khan usually uses her powers to stretch and "embiggen" herself to grow her fists. In addition to being a part of the Secret Warriors, Khan is also a former Avenger, and current leader of the Champions.
Lunella Lafayette
Codename: Moon Girl, an elementary school student who is also the smartest human alive. Lafayette is a genius inventor, and is also best friends with Devil Dinosaur.
Devil Dinosaur
A large monster from several million years ago, who was transported to modern day before befriending Lafayette.
Inferno (Dante Pertuz)
An Inhuman who has the ability to set himself on fire, and personally knows Inhuman queen Medusa.
Karnak
A member of the Inhuman royal family who can see the weak spots in anything, including people.
Magik (Illyana Rasputin)
A member of the X-Men with the ability to use magic and teleport via a hell dimension known as Limbo.

== Reception ==
The series holds an average rating of 7.6 by 41 professional critics on the review aggregation website Comic Book Roundup.

Jesse Schedeen, in IGN's review of issue #1, compared it to the original Secret Warriors by Jonathan Hickman and said, "fans of the original Secret Warriors comic will need to keep their expectations firmly in check for Vol. 2". He highlighted that the only linkage between the volumes is Daisy Johnson – "it's certainly less espionage-focused and more of a traditional superhero comic". Schedeen commented that "it doesn't help that Daisy does little to stand out as the main protagonist. Rosenberg focuses mainly on her disillusionment with S.H.I.E.L.D. in the wake of Captain America's betrayal, but even that does little to lend sympathy to her cause. [...] Javier Garron at least brings an energetic feel to the series".

In his review of issue #4 for IGN, Schedeen commented that "Marvel did this series no favors at all by giving it the 'Secret Warriors' branding and inviting unwarranted comparisons to the previous volume. The good news is that the series is starting to find its footing, even if it continues to share little in common with its namesake. The increased emphasis on Daisy's moral relativity and the conflict between her and her more idealistic teammates gives the book some much-needed dramatic weight. [...] Javier Garron's figure work is still a problem at times, both in the weirdly exaggerated, distended facial expressions and the wonky perspective".

Tara Bennett, in IGN's review of issue #5, wrote that "Secret Warriors has been a weird series for me personally because I loathe Secret Empire with my every being, and couldn't care less about the Inhumans, but this Secret Empire tie-in, starring the Inhumans, is so freaking good. It's a great successor to the Secret Warriors title, featuring heroes who are engaged in nothing less than treason, kidnapping, espionage, thievery, and murder. [...] For a long time, Marvel's been trying to make us care about Inhumans. For the first time since the Ellis/Zaffino Karnak series, they've succeeded".

Joshua Davison, in Bleeding Cool's review of issue #12, commented that "honestly, I am pretty disappointed to see this book get canned. [...] It's one of the last gasps of the Inhumans in Marvel. Just because Marvel made a huge mistake in trying to position them as the new X-Men, that doesn't mean the Inhumans are a terrible group of characters". On issue #12, Davison called it "pretty good" and "endearing". He highlighted that Ramon Bachs' "art isn't particularly impressive, but it's not awful either. [...] Matthew Rosenberg sends the Secret Warriors off in a cute and fun tale of mending bridges and respecting differences".

On the series cancellation, Kofi Outlaw for ComicBook.com said, "this 2017 iteration of the Secret Warriors was born out of the 'Secret Empire' crossover, which wasn't Marvel's most acclaimed event (to say the least). It seems as though Marvel has been trying to wrap up all things 'Secret Empire' and tie the storylines off, setting the stage for new chapter. Despite solid critical and fan acclaim, Secret Warriors may just be another casualty of that situation. Writer Matthew Rosenberg and artist Javier Garron managed to gather one of the oddest collection of Marvel heroes we've ever seen, and yet, made this quirky weird family work, while providing some exciting ties to the larger Marvel Universe - often in unexpected ways".

== In other media ==
A variation of the Secret Warriors appear in the 2018 animated film Marvel Rising: Secret Warriors. The film focused on Kamala Khan / Ms. Marvel (Kathreen Khavari), Doreen Green / Squirrel Girl (Milana Vayntrub), America Chavez (Cierra Ramirez), Dante Pertuz / Inferno (Tyler Posey), Rayshaun Lucas / Patriot (Kamil McFadden), Daisy Johnson / Quake (Chloe Bennet) and Carol Danvers / Captain Marvel (Kim Raver).

== Prints ==
=== Issues ===
No.	Title	Cover date	Comic Book Roundup rating	Estimated sales (first month)	Rated
#1	To Begin The World Over Again Part One	July 2017	8.0 by ten professional critics.	31,864, ranked 75th in North America	12+
#2	To Begin the World Over Again Part Two	July 2017	7.3 by seven professional critics.	23,902, ranked 110th in North America	12+
#3	To Begin the World Over Again Part Three	August 2017	8.0 by four professional critics.	20,457, ranked 130th in North America	12+
#4	To Begin the World Over Again Part Four	September 2017	7.3 by three professional critics.	20,457, ranked 130th in North America	12+
#5	To Begin the World Over Again Part Five	October 2017	8.7 by three professional critics.	12,507, ranked 167th in North America	12+
#6	If Trouble Must Come Part One	November 2017	7.3 by two professional critics.	11,640, ranked 169th in North America	12+
#7	If Trouble Must Come Part Two	December 2017	6.0 by one professional critic.	9,947, ranked 183th in North America	12+
#8	We Esteem Too Lightly Part One	January 2018	8.0 by two professional critics.		12+
#9	We Esteem Too Lightly Part Two	January 2018	7.4 by four professional critics.		12+
#10	We Esteem Too Lightly Part Three	February 2018	7.5 by three professional critics.		12+
#11	We Esteem Too Lightly Part Four	February 2018	7.9 by two professional critics.		12+
#12	We Esteem Too Lightly Part Five	March 2018	7.8 by four professional critics.		12+

=== Collected editions ===
Title	Material collected	Publication date	ISBN
Secret Warriors Vol. 1: Secret Empire	Secret Warriors (vol. 2) #1-5	October 11, 2017	978-1-302-90692-4
Secret Warriors Vol. 2: If Trouble Must Come	Secret Warriors (vol. 2) #6-12	February 21, 2018	978-1-302-90693-1
