= Komal Shah =

Komal Shah may refer to:

- Komal Shah (art collector), Indian-born American art collector, philanthropist, investor, and businessperson in Silicon Valley
- Queen Komal of Nepal (born 1951), the wife of former King Gyanendra of Nepal, last Queen consort of Nepal before the monarchy was abolished in 2008.
