= Kamala =

Kamala may refer to:

== People and fictional characters ==
- Kamala (name) — lists people and characters with the surname or given name
  - Kamala Harris, 49th Vice President of the United States and 2024 Democratic Party presidential nominee
- Kamala (wrestler) (1950–2020), American professional wrestler
- Kamala II or Uncle Elmer (1939–1992), American professional wrestler
- Amala and Kamala, Indian feral children who were purportedly raised by wolves

== Places ==
- Kamala Point, Hawaii, United States
- Kamala River, Nepal and India
- Kamala Beach, Phuket Province, Thailand
- Kamala, a sub-district of Kathu District, Thailand

== Plants ==
- Nelumbo nucifera or kamala, a lotus
- Mallotus philippensis or kamala, in the spurge family

== Other uses ==
- Kamala (band), a Brazilian thrash metal group
- Kamala (film), a 2019 Malayalam film
- Kamala or Kamalatmika, a Hindu goddess
- Kamala or Lakshmi, a Hindu goddess
- Operation Kamala, political corruption by BJP in India
- Kamala (elephant), an elephant in the United States National Zoo

== See also ==
- Kamela (disambiguation)
- Komala (disambiguation)
- Kamal (disambiguation)
- Kamla (disambiguation)
- Kamali (disambiguation)
- Kamalia (disambiguation)
- Kamli (disambiguation)
