= Matthew Rosenberg (writer) =

American comic book writer

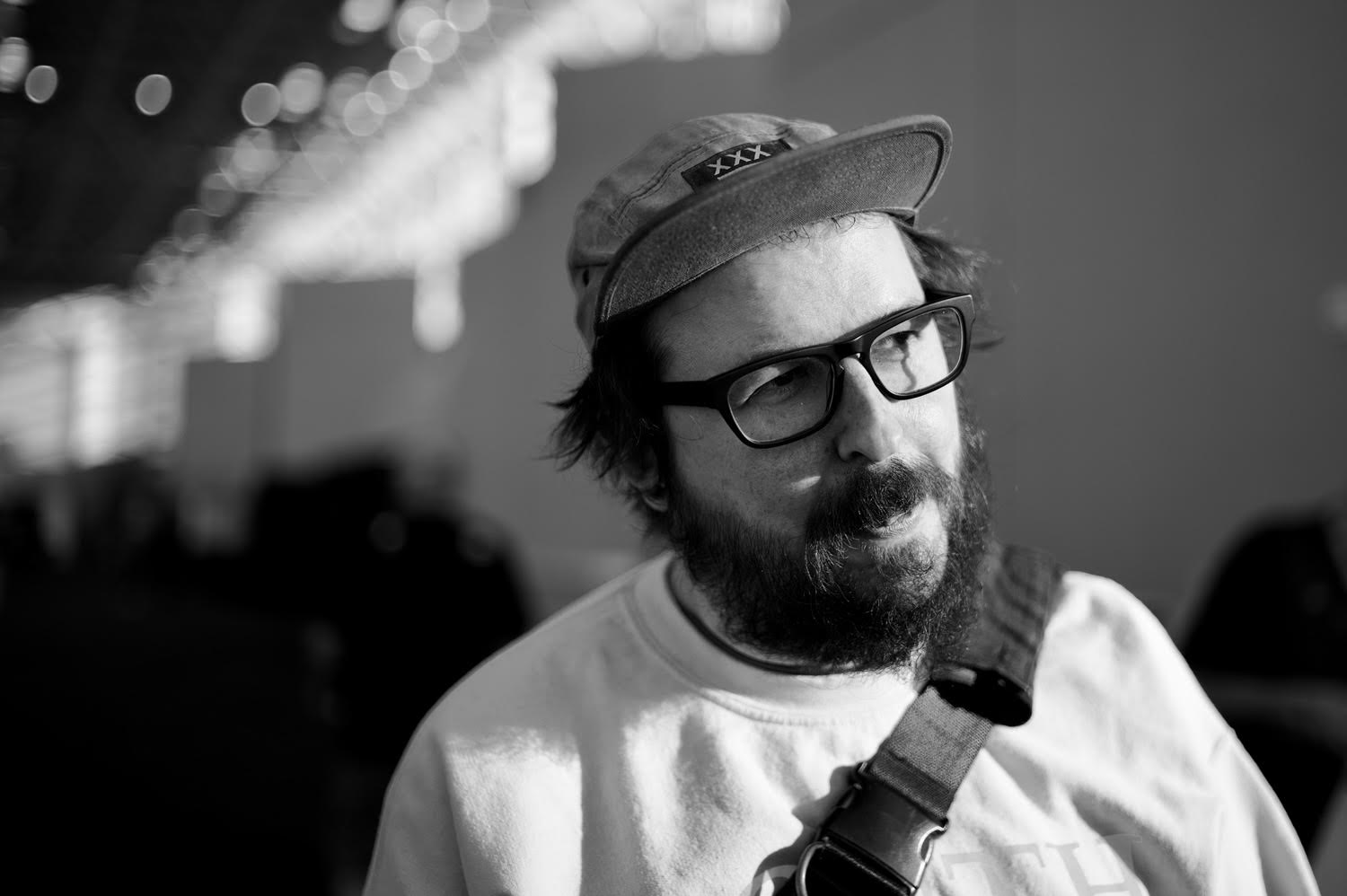
- Born: Matthew Rosenberg
- Area: Writer
- Notable works: We Can Never Go Home, 4 Kids Walk Into a Bank, The Punisher, Uncanny X-Men, Hawkeye: Freefall, Task Force Z, DC vs. Vampires, What's the Furthest Place from Here?, The Joker, We're Taking Everyone Down With Us
- www.AshcanPress.com

Matthew Rosenberg is an American comics writer who has worked for small press, Marvel Comics, and DC Comics. He is best known for his work on the Punisher, X-Men, the Red Hood, and the Joker, as well as his indie comic 4 Kids Walk Into a Bank with artist Tyler Boss. He also helps run a podcast called Ideas Don't Bleed with Ethan S. Parker and Griffin Sheridan.

== Career ==
One of the first comics Black Mask Studios published was Rosenberg's Twelve Reasons to Die, a collaboration with Ghostface Killah and RZA that he co-wrote with Patrick Kindlon. Rosenberg and Kindlon would then go on to write We Can Never Go Home, which was also published through Black Mask. After writing a Quake one-shot for S.H.I.E.L.D.'s 50th anniversary with Kindlon, Rosenberg returned to Black Mask to publish 4 Kids Walk Into a Bank with artist Tyler Boss. The book, which was about a young girl trying to stop her father from doing a heist, received critical acclaim. In 2020, it was optioned by Picturestart and in 2024, it was made into a movie starring Liam Neeson.

In 2016, it was announced that he would write the four-issue tie-in mini-series Civil War II: Kingpin, as well as a Rocket Raccoon series which saw Rocket stranded on Earth. The next year, 2017, he became the writer for the new volume of Secret Warriors, which spun out of the Secret Empire crossover. He also wrote Phoenix Resurrection: The Return of Jean Grey, which permanently brought back Jean Grey from the dead.

For Archie Comics, Rosenberg co-wrote The Archies one-shot and ongoing series with fellow writer Alex Segura, which combined his love for music and comics. He also took over writing The Punisher when the character stole the War Machine armor and wrote the 2018 relaunch of the book with artist Szymon Kudranski. The book sparked several news articles when one issued showed Frank Castle's disapproval of the cops using his symbol.

In 2019, after writing Multiple Man and Astonishing X-Men, Rosenberg, alongside Kelly Thompson and Ed Brisson, became the main writers for the relaunched Uncanny X-Men for a storyline called "X-Men Disassembled." Rosenberg became the sole writer of the book with issue 11 and wrote it until the book ended with issue 22. In 2020, he wrote Hawkeye: Freefall and co-wrote four issues of Amazing Spider-Man with Nick Spencer.

In 2021, it was announced that he would be writing two books for DC Comics, DC vs. Vampires and Task Force Z. He also began publishing a new indie book, What's the Furthest Place from Here? with artist Tyler Boss through Image Comics. He also wrote a number of books with the Joker, including The Joker Presents: A Puzzlebox, The Joker: The Man Who Stopped Laughing, and Knight Terrors: The Joker. A backup story in the fourth issue of The Joker: The Man Who Stopped Laughing sparked controversy after Fox News aired a segment about how it depicted a pregnant Joker and called it "woke garbage." Rosenberg responded to the controversy in his newsletter:

If you don't get your news from the "here's what to be angry about" people you may have missed this. But certain corners of the world are quite mad that the new issue of THE JOKER: THE MAN WHO STOPPED LAUGHING makes the Joker trans and then they become pregnant and give birth. How could we?! Think of the children!! Only, slight problem, none of that actually happens in the comic. That didn't stop Fox News, The NY Post, Channel 1 Russia, various internet outrage peddlers, and so many of the other sources of journalistic excellence from going all in on it this past week. This of course made social media somewhat unusable for me because things like this are Christmas for folks who like to get mad at stuff and yell at strangers. My DM's have never been more exciting!

In December of 2024, it was announced that Rosenberg would be teaming up with Stefano Landini for the six-issue comic We're Taking Everyone Down With Us.

As of 2026, He had become the writer for Spawn and King Spawn starting from 376 for the former and 55 for the latter

== Personal life ==
He was born and raised in New York City. His parents and brother are writers and he used to run a "small indie punk" label for ten years before moving into writing comics.

== Bibliography ==
=== Marvel Comics ===
- 2020 Force Works #1-3 (2020)
- Amazing Spider-Man vol. 5 #50.LR-54.LR (2020)
- Annihilation:
  - Annihilation - Scourge Alpha #1 (2019)
  - Annihilation - Scourge: Nova #1 (2019)
  - Annihilation - Scourge Omega #1 (2019)
- Edge of Venomverse #1 (2017)
- Elektra: Black, White, & Blood #1, short story "Powers You Can't Comprehend" (2022)
- Incoming #1 (2019)
- Hawkeye: Freefall #1-6 (2020)
- Kingpin:
  - Civil War II: Kingpin #1-4 (2016)
  - Kingpin #1-5 (2017)
  - King in Black: Thunderbolts #1-3 (2021)
- Marvel Comics #1000, short story "We Are What We Are" (2019)
- Marvel Knights 20th #2, 5 (2018–2019)
- Punisher:
  - Punisher vol. 2 #218-228 (2017–2018)
  - Punisher vol. 12 #1-16 (2018–2019)
- Quake: S.H.I.E.L.D. 50th Anniversary #1 (2015)
- Rocket Raccoon vol. 3 #1-5 (2016–2017)
- Secret Warriors vol. 2 #1-12 (2017–2018)
- Secret Wars Journal #1, short story "We Worship What We Don't Understand" (2015)
- Star Wars:
  - Star Wars #108 (2019)
  - Star Wars: Jedi Fallen Order - Dark Temple #1-5 (2019)
- Tales of Suspense #100-104 (2018)
- X-Men:
  - Phoenix Resurrection: The Return of Jean Grey #1-5 (2017–2018)
  - New Mutants: Dead Souls #1-6 (2018)
  - Multiple Man #1-5 (2018)
  - Astonishing X-Men vol. 4 #13-17, Annual (2018)
  - Uncanny X-Men vol. 5 #1-22 (2018–2019)
  - Merry X-Men Holiday Special #1, short story "The Gift of the Madri" (2018)
  - War of the Realms: Uncanny X-Men #1-3 (2019)

=== DC Comics ===
- Batman and Red Hood:
  - Batman: The Brave and the Bold vol. 2 #7, short story "The Wager" (2024)
  - Batman: Urban Legends #1-6, six-part story "Cheer" (2021)
  - Batman/Catwoman: The Gotham War: Red Hood #1-2 (2023)
  - Detective Comics #1041-1043, 1047-1058, backup stories (2021–2022), 2021 Annual
  - Task Force Z #1-12 (2021–2022)
  - Future State: Dark Detective #1, 3, backup stories (2021)
  - Legends of the Dark Knight vol. 2 #6, short story "A Hard Rain's A-Gonna Fall" (2021)
- Birds of Prey Giant #1, short story "Please, Please, Please, Let Me Get What I Want" (2020)
- Black Canary vol. 4 #9 (2016)
- Dark Crisis: War Zone #1, short story "Make Our Confessions Long 'cuz When We Pray We Keep It Short" (2023)
- Dark Nights: Death Metal: The Last 52: War of the Multiverses #1, short story "Armageddon Blues" (2021)
- DC vs. Vampires:
  - DC vs. Vampires #1-12 (2021–2023)
  - DC vs. Vampires: All-Out War #1-6 (2022–2023)
  - DC vs. Vampires: Hunters #1 (2022)
  - DC vs. Vampires: Killers #1 (2022)
  - DC vs. Vampires: World War V #1-present (2024-present)
- Joker:
  - The Joker vol. 2 #5, 10 (2021–2022), 2021 Annual
  - The Joker Presents: A Puzzlebox #1-7 (2021–2022)
  - The Joker: The Man Who Stopped Laughing #1-12 (2022–2024)
  - Knight Terrors: The Joker #1-2 (2023)
- WildC.A.T.s vol. 2 #1-12 (2023–2024)
- Wildstorm 30th Anniversary Special #1, short story "The Grifter" (2023)

=== Independent Comics ===
==== Archie Comics ====
- Archie Meets Ramones #1 (2016), co-written with Alex Segura
- The Archies: One Shot #1 (2017), co-written with Alex Segura
- The Archies #1-7 (2017–2018), co-written with Alex Segura
- Archie Meets the B-52s #1 (2020), co-written with Alex Segura

==== Black Mask Studios ====
- Occupy Comics #3 (2013)
- Twelve Reasons to Die #1-6 (2013–2014)
- We Can Never Go Home #1-5 (2015)
- 4 Kids Walk Into a Bank #1-5 (2016–2017)

==== Tiny Onion Studios ====
- Razorblades #2, short story "Somewhere to Keep My Things" (2020)

==== Image Comics ====
- What's the Furthest Place from Here? #1–present (2021–present)
- The Silver Coin #8 (2022)
- We're Taking Everyone Down with Us #1–6 (2025)
- Spawn:#376-present
- King Spawn:#55-present.

==== Oni Press ====
- Epitaphs from the Abyss #5-6, short stories (2024)
