= Kamli =

Kamli may refer to:

- Kamli, a 2000 album by Kamal Heer
- Kamli (2006 film), an Indian Telugu-language film
- Kamli (2022 film), a Pakistani drama film
- Kamli (2025 TV series), a 2025 Indian Marathi-language soap opera
- Kamli, a song by Sunidhi Chauhan from the 2013 Indian film Dhoom 3
- Kamlee, a song by Kanika Kapoor from the 2014 Indian film Happy New Year

== See also ==
- Kamali (disambiguation)
- Kamalia (disambiguation)
- Kamal (disambiguation)
- Kamala (disambiguation)
