= Kamala Khan =

Superheroine in Marvel Comics

Kamala Khan Ms. Marvel
- Textless variant cover of Ms. Marvel #2 (March 2014). Art by Jorge Molina.

Publication information
- Publisher: Marvel Comics
- First appearance: Background cameo: Captain Marvel #14 (August 2013); Full appearance: All-New Marvel Now! Point One #1 (January 2014)
- Created by: Sana Amanat; Stephen Wacker; G. Willow Wilson; Adrian Alphona; Jamie McKelvie

In-story information
- Full name: Kamala Khan
- Species: Inhuman/Mutant hybrid
- Place of origin: Jersey City, New Jersey
- Team affiliations: Avengers; Young Avengers; Champions; Secret Warriors; Protectors; New Avengers; Agents of Atlas; X-Men; X-Force
- Partnerships: Captain Marvel (Carol Danvers); Spider-Man (Miles Morales); Cyclops
- Notable aliases: Ms. Marvel; Mystic Marvel
- Abilities: Morphogenetics; Superhuman elasticity, plasticity and malleability; Appearance/size alteration; Regenerative healing factor; Bioluminescence; Shapeshifting; Hard-light generation; Portal creation, time and dimensional travel

Kamala Khan is a superheroine who appears in American comic books published by Marvel Comics. Created by editors Sana Amanat and Stephen Wacker, writer G. Willow Wilson, and artists Adrian Alphona and Jamie McKelvie, Kamala is Marvel's first major Muslim protagonist character and South Asian-American personality with her own comic book. In the Marvel Universe, she is a teenage Pakistani-American from Jersey City, New Jersey with body-morphing abilities who discovers that she has Inhuman genes in the aftermath of the "Inhumanity" storyline. She assumes the mantle of Ms. Marvel from her idol, Carol Danvers, after Danvers becomes Captain Marvel.

Kamala made her first appearance in a background cameo in Captain Marvel #14 (August 2013), before appearing in the anthology All-New Marvel Now! Point One #1 (January 2014). Her first of several Ms. Marvel solo series debuted in February 2014, with the character playing a prominent role in the "Inhumans vs X-Men" company crossover, and prominent supporting roles in the team-up books Champions and Secret Warriors, as well as the 2022 The Amazing Spider-Man series. In a 2023 storyline, Kamala joined the X-Men franchise when it was revealed she was an in fact an Inhuman/mutant hybrid, reflecting changes made for her live-action adaptation, and has been a prominent character in X-Men comics in their "Fall of X" and "From the Ashes" eras.

Marvel's announcement that a Muslim character would headline a comic book attracted widespread attention, with The New York Times Best Seller Ms. Marvel: No Normal winning the 2015 Hugo Award for best graphic story. The character and her solo series have received an overwhelmingly positive critical reception, with strong sales for her solo series. However, her 2019 and 2023 deaths in Champions and The Amazing Spider-Man, respectively, have been criticized as fridging.

Iman Vellani plays the character in the Marvel Cinematic Universe (MCU) miniseries Ms. Marvel, the attraction Avengers: Quantum Encounter (both 2022), the film The Marvels (2023), and the animated miniseries Marvel Zombies (2025); unlike in the comic books, Kamala is reimagined as a latent mutant who uses a magical bangle to create glowing constructs out of hard light. From 2016 to 2019, the character was voiced by Kathreen Khavari in animated series such as Avengers Assemble, Marvel Rising, and Spider-Man. She was voiced by Sandra Saad in the video game Marvel's Avengers (2020) and the animated series Spidey and His Amazing Friends (2021).

== Overview ==
=== Creative origins ===
Marvel Comics announced in November 2013 that Kamala Khan, a teenage American Muslim from Jersey City, New Jersey, would take over the comic-book series Ms. Marvel in February 2014. The series, written by G. Willow Wilson and drawn by Adrian Alphona, marked the first time a Muslim character headlined a Marvel Comics book. Noelene Clark of the Los Angeles Times noted that Kamala is not the first Muslim character in comic books; other Muslim characters include Simon Baz, Dust and M. The character was conceived during a conversation between Marvel editors Sana Amanat and Stephen Wacker. Amanat said, "I was telling him [Wacker] some crazy anecdote about my childhood, growing up as a Muslim American. He found it hilarious". They then told Wilson about the concept, and Wilson was eager to join it. Amanat said that the series came from a "desire to explore the Muslim-American diaspora from an authentic perspective".

Artist Jamie McKelvie based Kamala's costume on his redesign of Carol Danvers as Captain Marvel and on Dave Cockrum's design of the original Ms. Marvel. Amanat asked that the design "reflect the Captain Marvel legacy, and also her story and her background", and said that Kamala's costume was influenced by the shalwar kameez. They wanted the costume to represent her cultural identity but did not want her to wear a hijab, because most teenage Pakistani-American girls do not wear one. Amanat said that they wanted her to look "less like a sex siren" to appeal to a broader female readership.

Marvel wanted a young Muslim girl, saying that she could be from anywhere and have any background. Wilson initially considered making her an Arab girl from Dearborn, Michigan or a Somali American with the comic set in Seattle, but ultimately made Kamala a Desi girl from Jersey City. Jersey City, across the Hudson River from Manhattan, has been called New York City's "sixth borough". The city is an important part of Kamala's identity and the narrative, since most Marvel Comics stories are set in Manhattan. Wilson said, "A huge aspect of Ms. Marvel is being a 'second string hero' in the 'second string city' and having to struggle out of the pathos and emotion that can give a person".

The series explores Kamala's conflicts with supervillains and her domestic and religious duties. Wilson, a convert to Islam, said: "This is not evangelism. It was really important for me to portray Kamala as someone who is struggling with her faith ... Her brother is extremely conservative, her mom is paranoid that she's going to touch a boy and get pregnant, and her father wants her to concentrate on her studies and become a doctor". Amanat said,

As much as Islam is a part of Kamala's identity, this book isn't preaching about religion or the Islamic faith in particular. It's about what happens when you struggle with the labels imposed on you, and how that forms your sense of self. It's a struggle we've all faced in one form or another, and isn't just particular to Kamala because she's Muslim. Her religion is just one aspect of the many ways she defines herself.

=== Powers and abilities ===
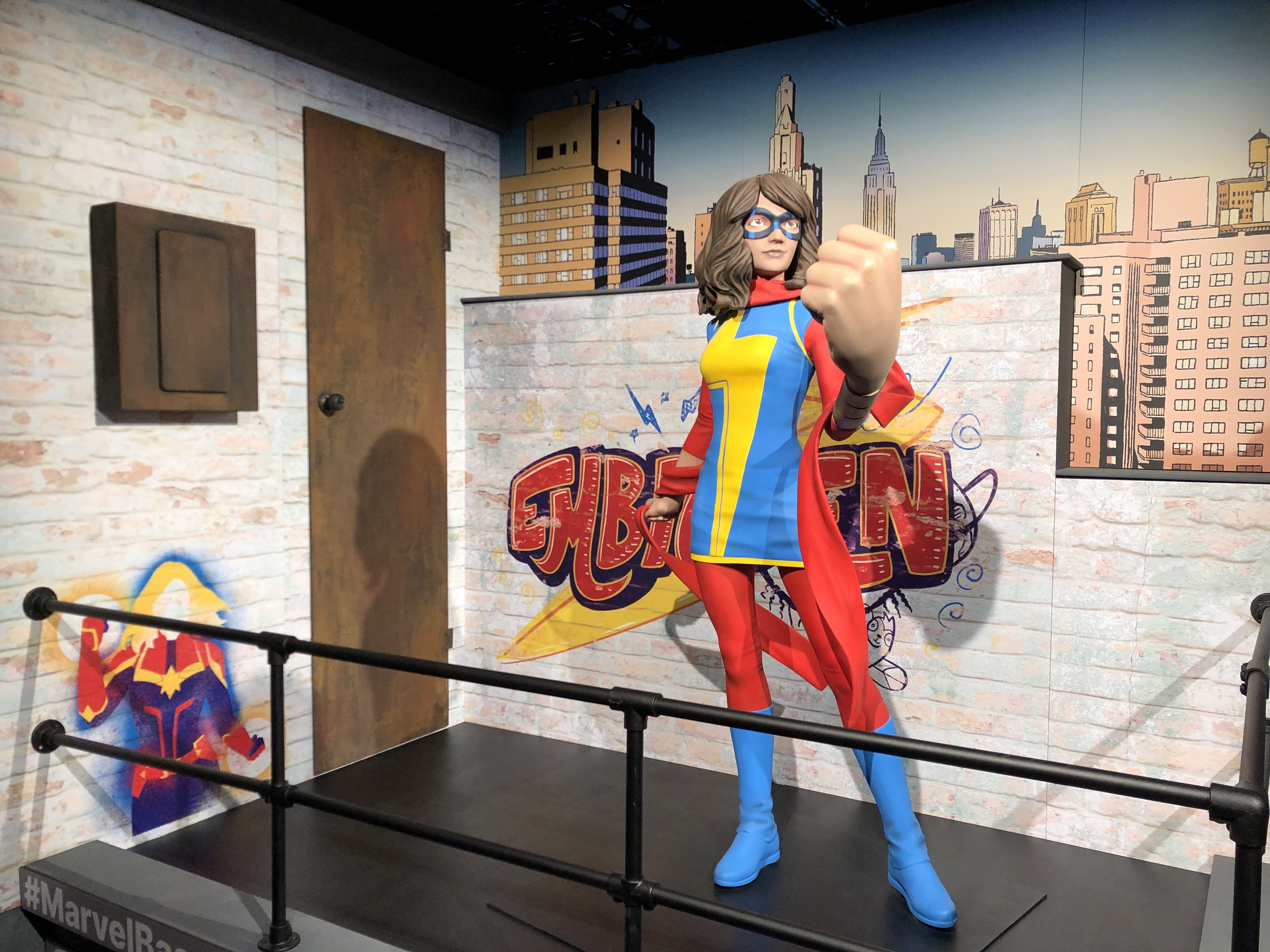
A statue of Kamala as Ms. Marvel with an embiggened fist at the Marvel: Universe of Super Heroes exhibition in Basel.

Kamala develops her superpowers after Marvel's Infinity storyline, when the Terrigen Mists are released. Her dormant Inhuman abilities are activated by the mists on a rare night when she rebelliously decides to sneak out after her parents forbid her from attending a school party. Amanat said in 2022 that when she and Wilson were creating Kamala, the character was originally going to be a mutant before they changed her to an Inhuman. Screen Rant noted that Kamala is a "polymorph", with moves which "are basically Ant-Man and Mister Fantastic's combined". According to academic Sarah Gibbons, Kamala's body-morphing is paralleled by the flexibility required of the characters who live in Jersey City; her unusual, superpowered body shape conveys a non-conforming message.

Her best-known power is elongation, which allows her to extend her limbs, torso, or neck great distances. Kamala's other powers include the ability to alter her size, shrinking and enlarging herself. When she enlarges, she can lift up to 75 tons. Kamala has also used this ability to make her body as thin as paper. She has a healing factor (capable of healing bullet wounds), which works when she is not using her polymorph abilities. If Kamala extensively heals, however, she becomes very tired. She can shapeshift into other people and inanimate objects, although she rarely uses this power.

Asked about Kamala's transition from comic book to live action in 2019, Wilson said: "I think there're some characters who are very much set up for the big screen; they're very naturally sort of cinematic. But with Ms. Marvel, we really weren't interested in creating something that had very obvious film potential [...] She's got very comic booky powers. God bless them trying to bring that to live action; I don't know how that's going to work out in a way that doesn't look really creepy". Kamala's comic-book powers are reinterpreted for the live-action version of the character which debuted in the Marvel Cinematic Universe (MCU) in 2022. This iteration has "the ability to create and manipulate a kind of purple 'hard-light' (think Green Lantern, or Symmetra from Overwatch)". In the series finale of Ms. Marvel, "No Normal", it is revealed that Kamala Khan has a genetic mutation. Iman Vellani then confirmed that Kamala was the first mutant in the MCU.

Kamala is later revealed to have both Inhuman and mutant heritage during the X-Men Krakoan Age storyline in the comics, with Charles Xavier believing that Kamala having her Inhuman powers activating first may have suppressed her mutant powers. Xavier noted that unlike other mutants, Kamala was able to make contact with Terrigen Mist without suffering any ill effects. She will "retain her original stretchy embiggening powers that were established via her Inhuman heritage". When Kamala's body begins to disintegrate due to being resurrected without properly undergoing Terrigenesis, Kamala undergoes the process again to stabilize herself but this poses the risk of never awakening her mutation. An Orchis scientist reanimates Kamala's original body as a zombie with her mutant powers activated – these powers are revealed to be purple hard light constructs which were first seen in the MCU iteration of the character and are used in conjunction with her original body's Inhuman embiggening powers.

After being pulled into the past and helping the X-Men during their rescue mission on Krakoa, Kamala awakens her mutant powers while fighting a time-displaced Legion; her body emits a golden, diamond-patterned aura that generates firework-like sparks. In her second fight with Legion, who has been possessed by the Phoenix Force, Kamala's hard-light takes on a purple, crystal-like appearance and is shown to be strong enough to restrain Legion, an omega-level mutant. In her final confrontation with Legion, the villain discovers that Kamala possesses Krakoa's DNA in her genes, giving her the unique ability to turn her body into a living portal that acts similar to Krakoa's Gateways, which also allows time and dimensional travel.

== Publication history ==
=== Volume one (2013–2015) ===
Kamala is the daughter of Yusuf and Muneeba Khan and the younger sister of Aamir Khan. She takes the name Ms. Marvel from Carol Danvers, who is now known as Captain Marvel. Captain Marvel writer Kelly Sue DeConnick said that Kamala made a brief appearance in Captain Marvel #14 (August 2013): "Kamala is in the background of a scene in Captain Marvel 14 ... She is very deliberately placed in a position where she sees Carol protecting civilians from Yon-Rogg". She has a second cameo appearance in Captain Marvel #17 (November 2013). According to co-creator G. Willow Wilson, Kamala idolizes Carol and emulates her when she acquires superhuman abilities: "Captain Marvel represents an ideal that Kamala pines for. She's strong, beautiful and doesn't have any of the baggage of being Pakistani and 'different'". "Khan is a big comic book fan and after she discovers her superhuman power – being a polymorph and able to lengthen her arms and legs and change her shape – she takes on the name of Ms. Marvel", Amanat said. Kamala initially appears in "Garden State of Mind" in the anthology All-New Marvel Now! Point One #1 (January 2014) before debuting in the solo series Ms. Marvel with the first issue released in February 2014. Kamala is one of several characters who discover that they have Inhuman heritage after the "Inhumanity" storyline, in which the Terrigen Mists are released worldwide and activate dormant Inhuman cells.

She opposes Inventor, a clone of Thomas Edison tainted with the DNA of Gregory Knox's pet cockatiel, in the series' first story arc. Wilson created the Inventor as Kamala's first archenemy to mirror her complexity. She characterized the Inventor and the overall look of the opening story arc as "kooky and almost Miyazaki-esque at times" due to the style of illustrator Adrian Alphona, which balances the drama of the threats faced by Kamala with the humor of Alphona's "tongue in cheek sight gags". During the story line, Kamala also teams up with the X-Man Wolverine against the Inventor. Because Wolverine is dealing with the loss of his healing factor during this time, Kamala is placed in the position of having to shoulder much of the responsibilities since Wilson felt this was a role reversal that would subvert reader expectations that Wolverine would take the lead in such a team-up.

At the 2014 San Diego Comic-Con, writer Dan Slott announced that Kamala would join Spider-Man in The Amazing Spider-Man #7 (October 2014) during the "Spider-Verse" storyline. Slott characterized Kamala as "the closest character to classic Peter Parker": "She's a teenage superhero, juggling her life, making mistakes, trying to do everything right".

Ms. Marvel tied into the "Secret Wars" crossover event with the "Last Days" storyline in June 2015, which details Kamala's account of the end of the Marvel Universe. Wilson said, "In the 'Last Days' story arc, Kamala has to grapple with the end of everything she knows, and discover what it means to be a hero when your whole world is on the line". Kamala rushes to deal with the threat in Manhattan and, according to Wilson, "She will face a very personal enemy as the chaos in Manhattan spills over into Jersey City, and she will be forced to make some very difficult choices. There will also be a very special guest appearance by a superhero Kamala—and the fans—have been waiting to meet for a long time".

=== Volume two (2015–2018) ===
Marvel announced in March 2015 that Kamala would join the Avengers in All-New All-Different Avengers FCBD (May 2015) by writer Mark Waid and artists Adam Kubert and Mahmud Asrar, which takes place in the aftermath of "Secret Wars", with Kamala personally facing off against enigmatic Asian American billionaire Mister Gryphon. A second volume of Ms. Marvel, starring Kamala, by Wilson, Alphona and Takeshi Miyazawa also debuted after "Secret Wars" as part of Marvel's All-New, All-Different Marvel initiative. Amanat said,

By the time this new launch comes around, it will have been almost two years since the premiere of Ms. Marvel—and boy, has Kamala Khan been through a lot since then. She's been slowly coming into her own, dealing with the challenges of navigating adulthood and being a super hero. But her training is over now and it's time for the big leagues; the question is can she handle it? ... As much as Kamala has a right to be there—it's still a bit of a culture shock. Dreaming of being an Avenger and then suddenly being one is a lot to take on for someone of her age. So, she'll be a little awestruck, a little overly ambitious.

In March 2016, Marvel announced with a promotional image illustrating a rift between Kamala and Danvers that Ms. Marvel would tie into the "Civil War II" storyline. Amanat said that this storyline would center "around self-discovery and identity, and a part of that exploration includes separating yourself from those you put on pedestals [...] It has to do with growing up and realizing that you perceive the world differently from even the ones you love". Academic Sandra Eckard wrote, "Kamala at first follows her mentor's lead until she realizes that she is not comfortable with putting people in jail for crimes they may commit. The idea of 'predictive justice' that Kamala fights against leads to a domino effect of her friends abandoning her and Captain Marvel dismissing her from duty in her group and friendship. Kamala, broken and hopeless, goes on a journey to find herself in Pakistan". According to Eckard, Kamala realizes in this journey that places cannot fix a person and problems within oneself "must be figured and sorted out by that person". The story arc introduces Kamala to Kareem, a family friend, and to a young Pakistani hero named Red Dagger. Kamala does not discover that Red Dagger is Kareem, and Kareem does not know Ms. Marvel's secret identity.

Marvel announced in July 2016 that Kamala would join the Champions, a team of teenage superheroes who leave the Avengers after the conclusion of "Civil War II". The team, featured in a series by writer Mark Waid and artist Humberto Ramos, consists of Kamala, Spider-Man (Miles Morales), Nova (Sam Alexander), Hulk (Amadeus Cho), Viv Vision, and a teenage version of Cyclops. Waid said, "The first three are the kids who quit the Avengers proper. That was an easy get. Those three, in and of themselves, form a nice little subteam. Their dynamic is great. They all show up in each other's books, and even though they have their arguments and stress points, clearly they're good together".

The following month, Kamala appeared in Moon Girl and Devil Dinosaur #10 by writers Amy Reeder and Brandon Montclare. She is a mentor to Moon Girl (Lunella Lafayette), a fellow young Inhuman who suddenly acquires her powers. Amanat said that Kamala sees much of herself in Lunella and, by teaching her, learns much about herself.

In November 2016, Marvel announced that Kamala would join a new incarnation of the Secret Warriors in a series by writer Matthew Rosenberg and artist Javier Garron; it debuted in May 2017. The team is composed of "Inhumans who are a little outside traditional Inhuman culture", such as Quake, Karnak, Moon Girl, and Devil Dinosaur, and was formed in the wake of the "Inhumans vs X-Men" storyline. Rosenberg said that there is some conflict and friction amongst the team members: "Ms. Marvel and Quake are really fighting for the soul of the team in a lot of ways, while Moon Girl will continue to really do her own thing. They will all be tested and challenged, they are superheroes after all, but they are going to do things their way". The first five issues of the Secret Warriors series were tied to the Marvel Secret Empire crossover storyline.

Marvel announced in March 2017 that Kamala would join Carol Danvers in a one-shot issue of the limited anthology series, Generations by Wilson and Paolo Villanelle. Wilson said that the issue would explore Carol and Kamala's mentor–student relationship, but "at its heart, [it] is about growing up, and a big part of growing up is discovering that your idols have feet of clay – and forgiving them for their flaws as you gain an adult understanding of your own".

From April to August 2017, the Champions series was also involved in the Secret Empire storyline. In the final story arc of the second volume of Champions, Kamala survived Weirdworld with her teammates. In October of that year, Kareem returns to Ms. Marvel in issue #23 as an exchange student at Kamala's high school. In this story arc, Kamala (as Ms. Marvel) has her first kiss with Red Dagger.

==== Marvel Legacy relaunch ====
Kamala Khan dead in Spider-Man/Miles Morales' arms after being murdered by Zzzax, from Champions (2019) #3. Art by Steven Cummings.

In December 2017, Ms. Marvel began the "Teenage Wasteland" story arc as part of the Marvel Legacy relaunch. Wilson said, "Since the events of 'Civil War II', there's been friction between Kamala and her mentor, Captain Marvel. In this arc, we're exploring how complicated legacies can be when they're passed from generation to generation ... She's questioning a lot about herself and her mission. Her friends end up stepping into some very important—and unexpected—roles. So in a sense, the arc is really about a bunch of chronically under-estimated teenagers who pull together to fight evil".

In January 2018, Secret Warriors was cancelled after twelve issues. Kamala continued to co-lead the Champions with Miles Morales, which relaunched with a third volume that month. According to IGN, "writer Jim Zub will be sticking around, and he'll be joined by new artist Stephen Cummings as the two explore what happens when Ms. Marvel takes the team global". In the third volume's first arc, Kamala and Viv Vision are killed in a battle against the supervillain Zzzax in Dubai. Miles arranges for their deaths to be undone by agreeing to the devil Mephisto's offer of a "cosmic do-over", turning back time so that Miles and Amadeus Cho survive and restrain Zzzax. This is done at the cost of a bystander's life who Miles had originally saved from falling rubble – in this new timeline, the bystander dies instead of Kamala and Viv. Guilt-ridden, Miles eventually tells Kamala of her death and the cost of her revival, "breaking her heart" and ending their friendship, before leaving the team in issue #4. In July 2019, it was announced that Champions had been cancelled, with issue #10 in October serving as its last.

Ms. Marvel #31—the 50th issue of Ms. Marvel featuring Kamala—was published in June 2018. To mark the occasion, Marvel brought in additional collaborators for the issue: writers G. Willow Wilson, Saladin Ahmed, Rainbow Rowell, and Hasan Minhaj, and artists Nico Leon, Bob Quinn, Gustavo Duarte, and Elmo Bondoc.

=== The Magnificent Ms. Marvel (2019–2021) ===
Cover of The Magnificent Ms. Marvel (2019) #1 with art by Eduard Petrovich.

Kamala headlined The Magnificent Ms. Marvel, a new series written by Saladin Ahmed and illustrated by Minkyu Jung, in March 2019. Wilson said that she had planned her departure from the series for over a year (originally anticipating that it would only last for ten issues) and was pleased at having written 60 issues. Ahmed said that the new series would have a broader scope, "while still maintaining that intimate tone that people have loved about it".

From April to September 2019, Kamala headlined the ongoing relaunch of Marvel Team-Up. The first three issues, written by Eve Ewing and illustrated by Joey Vazquez, focused on Ms. Marvel and Spider-Man. Issues 4–6, written by Clint McElroy and illustrated by Ig Guara, focused on Ms. Marvel and Captain Marvel; the series was then cancelled.

Marvel announced in July 2020 that Kamala would star in a graphic novel, published in collaboration with Scholastic Corporation and aimed at younger readers. Ms. Marvel: Stretched Thin, written by Nadia Shammas and illustrated by Nabi H. Ali, was published on September 7, 2021.

Kamala was a focus of the October 2020 one-shot Outlawed #1, which began the "Outlawed" storyline in The Magnificent Ms. Marvel series and the relaunched Champions series. The Champions protect a young climate activist, speaking at Coles Academic High School, who is targeted by the Roxxon Oil Company. As the fight between the Champions and Roxxon escalates, the school collapses. Kamala saves the activist, but is critically injured; the government passes the Underage Superhuman Welfare Act, which bans superhero activities for those under age twenty-one, as a result of the disaster. Although the act is renamed "Kamala's Law", the character's secret identity remains intact.

Champions #1 and The Magnificent Ms. Marvel #14 pick up six months later, as they deal with fallout from Kamala's Law. CBR reported that "without disclosing her true identity, Ms. Marvel rejects Kamala's Law and publicly vows to continue her superhero activities alongside the Champions regardless of her age [...] Kamala's message has quickly split the young superhero community. Several agree to continue their double lives as usual in open defiance of the controversial law, while others believe Kamala is in the wrong and they should leave superhero activity to the adults". During the "Outlawed" event, the Champions take responsibility for their actions and reveal that Roxxon is using its government contract to intern young individuals with superpowers in brutal reeducation camps. This cause Roxxon to lose its contract, and the government suspends enforcement of Kamala's Law.

After the "Outlawed" event, The Magnificent Ms. Marvel ended its run with issue #18 (the 75th issue of the Kamala Khan Ms. Marvel comics) in April 2021. Kamala continued to appear in the Champions series, which covered the repeal of Kamala's Law. The series was then cancelled, with its last issue October 2021.

=== Limited series (2021–2022) ===
Kamala next headlined a new limited series, Ms. Marvel: Beyond the Limit, written by Samira Ahmed and illustrated by Andrés Genolet. According to Entertainment Weekly, "Ms. Marvel comics have only been written by Muslim writers so far [...]. But Samira Ahmed will be the first South Asian female writer to write a Ms. Marvel series". Ahmed is known for her young-adult novels, and Beyond the Limit was her first comic series. It had five issues, from December 2021 to April 2022. Kamala is on a multiverse adventure after visiting her cousin, Razia, a scientist who specializes in "multiversal theory". The series included multiverse variants of Kamala. A trade paperback collection of the five issues was published in June 2022, reportedly coinciding with the premiere of the Ms. Marvel television miniseries.

Marvel released the one-shot Ms. Marvel: Bottled Up, written by Samira Ahmed and illustrated by Ramon Bachs, in May 2022 as part of Marvel Unlimited's digital Infinity Comics. Kamala and her friend, Nakia, confront the destroyer Mariikh at the American Museum of Natural History after the jinn is accidentally released. In June 2022, Marvel announced a new weekly Love Unlimited romance anthology series on Marvel Unlimited's Infinity Comics. The first story arc, "Ms. Marvel and Red Dagger", was written by Nadia Shammas and illustrated by Natacha Bustos. The first of the storyline's six parts was published on June 9 of that year, and focuses on Kamala and Kareem (the Red Dagger) who have kissed but not yet shared their secret identities.

In April 2022, Marvel announced that Kamala would headline a series of one-shots, Ms. Marvel: Fists of Justice, in which she joins three heroes: Wolverine, Moon Knight, and Venom. The first issue, written by Jody Houser and illustrated by Zé Carlos was released in August 2022. According to CBR, the series is "a jumping-on point for Ms. Marvel newcomers, as the new saga will lay the groundwork for the character's next era [...] The series of one-shots begins shortly after Khan made her live-action debut in the new Disney+ Ms. Marvel series".

=== The Amazing Spider-Man (2022–2023) ===
Kamala Khan dead in Spider-Man/Peter Parker's arms with the Fantastic Four and other Spider-Man supporting characters surrounding them, from The Amazing Spider-Man (2022) #26. Art by John Romita Jr..

Cover of Fallen Friend: The Death of Ms. Marvel #1 with art by Kaare Andrews.

Kamala appeared as a new Oscorp intern in the renewable energy division in The Amazing Spider-Man vol. 5 #7 (August 2022) where she runs into Peter Parker; Kamala went on to be a reoccurring supporting character in the series. In September 2022, Marvel announced that Kamala's internship would be further explored in the two-issue series Dark Web: Ms. Marvel; this limited series is a tie-in to the Spider-Man/X-Men crossover comic event titled Dark Web which details Spider-Man and the X-Men fighting Goblin Queen and Chasm as Goblin Queen's magic reactivates the chip in Inventor's head enough to revive him. The first issue, written by Sabir Pirzada and illustrated by Francesco Mortarino, was released in December 2022.

Kamala continued to appear in Zeb Wells and John Romita Jr.'s relaunched The Amazing Spider-Man vol. 5 (2022) as the personal assistant of Norman Osborn. The Direct commented that Kamala "has only appeared on 14 out of 646 pages and 37 out of 3204 comic panels of Wells' story thus far, which includes The Amazing Spider-Man #1-25, Dark Web #1, and Dark Web Finale #1". Following a leak in May 2023, Marvel confirmed that Kamala would die in The Amazing Spider-Man #26 ahead of its publication on May 31. In the issue, Kamala saves Mary Jane Watson from being sacrificed by the dimension-hopping Emissary by using her shapeshifting abilities to take on Watson's appearance. The Emissary attacks Kamala, assuming she is Watson, which botches the Emissary's ritual, and leads to his death. However, Kamala is unable to heal from the wounds sustained during that attack. Kamala reveals her identity to Peter before dying in his arms.

This was followed by the single issue Fallen Friend: The Death of Ms. Marvel (2023) which released on July 12, 2023. The issue features various superheroes gathering to memorialize Ms. Marvel. The first chapter, by writer G. Willow Wilson and artist Takeshi Miyazawa, focuses on Ms. Marvel's supporting characters. The second chapter, by writer Mark Waid and artist Humberto Ramos, focuses on Kamala's Champions teammates. The third chapter, by writer Saladin Ahmed and artist Andrea Di Vito, focuses on several Avengers such as Iron Man, Captain America, and Spider-Man. The three chapters are structured around the reading of "Al-Falaq or The Daybreak, the 113th chapter of the Qur'an" during Kamala's funeral. An additional last page for the issue was released online – it shows the modern-day Cyclops showing up as people leave the funeral with his former Champions teammates furious at him for missing it. Cyclops responds, "You'll understand....Not today. But soon". On the same day, Marvel published a recap of the friendship between Cyclops and Kamala which highlighted that Cyclops had inherited the memories of his younger time-displaced counterpart who was a member of the Champions. It teased that "it may just be that enduring friendship that saves Kamala in the end".

=== X-Men and related limited series (2023–2024) ===
As part of the "Fall of X" relaunch, Kamala is resurrected on Krakoa in the July 2023 one-shot X-Men Hellfire Gala 2023 #1. Kamala discovers that she possesses a dormant X-Gene, making her a mutant/Inhuman hybrid. Charles Xavier plans to have Kamala announce her dual heritage to the general public at the Hellfire Gala to improve mutant and human relations, but is prevented from doing so when Orchis forces attack the Gala. In X-Men vol. 6 #25 (August 2023), Emma Frost uses her powers and connections to erase the memories and records of Ms. Marvel's death from the general public, including her family and friends. Kamala subsequently joins the X-Men, who are forced to operate underground amid the wave of anti-mutant sentiment fostered by Orchis. In The Amazing Spider-Man vol. 6 #31 (August 2023), Kamala reunites with Spider-Man, who apologizes for the circumstances surrounding her death and reveals his identity as Peter Parker to her.

Variant cover of Ms. Marvel: The New Mutant (2023) #2 with art by Jamie McKelvie featuring his costume design sheet with notes.

Later that month, Kamala starred in Ms. Marvel: The New Mutant, a four-issue limited series that follows Kamala's new status as a mutant and as member of the X-Men. The series was written by Iman Vellani, who portrays Kamala in the MCU, and Sabir Pirzada, who wrote Dark Web: Ms. Marvel and episodes of the Ms. Marvel show, and drawn by Carlos Gómez and Adam Gorham. McKelvie updated Kamala's costume to highlight "her newfound mutant identity, with X-Men logos replacing the traditional Ms. Marvel lightning bolt that dates back to Carol Danvers". Polygon commented that Kamala's "new yellow and blue costume from her original designer" is "befitting her new X-Men-y origin". In the miniseries, Kamala is sent by the X-Men on an undercover mission to infiltrate an Orchis-sponsored summer program at Empire State University (ESU) as a student. Ms. Marvel's ties to the X-Men and her mutant status are exposed, resulting in anti-mutant backlash against her. Kamala was also featured in the main ongoing X-Men series, starting in X-Men (vol. 6) #26 (September 2023).

After the conclusion of The New Mutant in November, the series was followed by another four-issue series titled Ms. Marvel: Mutant Menace, with Pirazda and Vellani returning as writers and Scott Godlewski joining for artwork. Released in March 2024, Mutant Menace would see Kamala returning to her hometown of Jersey City while dealing with her now public mutant status and having her encounter more X-Men and their villains. In Mutant Menace #4 (June 2024), rogue Orchis scientist Nitika Gaiha acquires the corpse of Kamala's original body and reanimates it as a zombie while awakening her original body's mutant powers in the process, revealed to be the ability to generate purple hard light constructs. Gaiha attempts to provoke Kamala into awakening her mutant powers in her resurrected body by unleashing the zombie onto civilians, but Kamala thwarts the threat without awakening her powers. This issue also sets up Kamala's relocation to New York City as she is now hated by "the people of Jersey City [...] for her perceived attack on the Mosque and [attempted] murder of Abdullah".

Kamala's involvement with the X-Men and their allies would continue in the 2024 dual miniseries Fall of the House of X and Rise of the Powers of X. In addition to X-Men related stories, Kamala appeared as a supporting character in Miles Morales: Spider-Man written by Cody Ziglar and illustrated by Federico Vicentini, during the "Gang War" tie-in and "Retribution" storyline. Kamala continued to appear in The Amazing Spider-Man during Wells' final arc on the series.

=== NYX and Giant-Size X-Men (2024–2025) ===
Kamala appeared in parts four to six of a connected storyline titled Infinity Watch (June – September 2024) told across nine annuals. The fourth part of the story was released on July 31, 2024, as Ms. Marvel Annual #1 (2024), with returning writers Pirzada and Vellani joined by event lead writer Derek Landy and art by Giada Belviso and Sara Pichelli. The Annual takes place after Mutant Menace and reveals that due to the zombie's existence being eventually revealed to the public, Kamala is able to salvage Ms. Marvel's reputation but is forced to further keep her mutation a secret to maintain her cover. Kamala was featured in the anthology one shot Marvel 85th Anniversary Special in a story, written by Pirzada and Vellani, set in a possible future where she uses both her Inhuman and mutant powers as a Herald of Galactus; the Marvel Comics 85th anniversary commemoration was released on August 28, 2024.

In July 2024, Kamala had a starring role in NYX (vol. 2), an ongoing series which was part of the "X-Men: From the Ashes" relaunch and written by writer duo Collin Kelly and Jackson Lanzing with art by Francesco Mortarino. The series centered on Kamala and several other mutant young adults – Laura Kinney, Anole, Prodigy, and Sophie Cuckoo – attempting to adapt to life in New York City in the post-Krakoan Age when mutants are hated and feared even more due to the actions of Orchis. The first issue highlights Kamala discovering that both she and Sophie are in the "Examinations of Post-Krakoan Diaspora" class at ESU that is being taught by Prodigy, saving Anole from an anti-mutant hate group called the Truthseekers, and clashing with Laura over how to protect mutants. In addition to dealing with the Truthseekers – whose ranks also includes her cousin Bilal – Kamala and her friends also contend with a new radicalized iteration of the Quiet Council of Krakoa – consisting of the Krakoan (formally Hellion), Empath, and the remaining Stepford Cuckoos – who plot against New York's humans as revenge for the fall of Krakoa, as well as Mojo, who also has his own nefarious plans for mutants in the city. The series ended with issue #10 in April 2025.

Although Lanzing commented that he and Kelly knew in advance NYX would end so they were able to include a finale for the characters, Kamala's story would continue in the Giant-Size X-Men Anniversary Event, commemorating the 50th anniversary of the first Giant-Size X-Men issue. Consisting of five one-shots written by NYX writers Kelly and Lanzing and with art by Adam Kubert, C.F. Villa and Francesco Manna, Giant-Size X-Men involves Kamala being pulled by Legion in a battle across time, where she encounters the X-Men during their most iconic moments in history and alternate timelines, including the "Second Genesis" and "The Dark Phoenix Saga" storylines and the Age of Apocalypse and "House of M" continuities. The event began with Giant-Size X-Men #1 (May 2025) and was followed by Giant-Size Dark Phoenix Saga #1 (June 2025), Giant-Size Age of Apocalypse #1 (June 2025), Giant-Size House of M #1 (July 2025) and Giant-Size X-Men #2 (August 2025). Giant-Size X-Men #1 concludes with Kamala finally awakening her mutant powers, with her hard light emitting a golden aura. Her energy constructs are initially colored gold, but later take on their original purple coloration during the climax of Giant-Size Dark Phoenix Saga. During this event, Kamala integrates both her mutant and Inhuman powers. Kamala also reveals her mutant status to her parents in the final issue Giant-Size X-Men #2.

Batman/Deadpool #1, a DC Comics crossover issue with Marvel, was released in November 2025. It included a back-up story by writer G. Willow Wilson and artist Denys Cowan that features a team-up between Kamala and Static.

=== Inglorious X-Force and Fugitive X-Force (2026-2027) ===
In January 2026, Kamala was added as a surprise member to the titular team in Inglorious X-Force, an ongoing series which was part of the "X-Men: Shadows of Tomorrow" event and written by Tim Seeley and illustrated by Michael Sta. Maria. In the series, Cable reforms X-Force to prevent the assassination of the first mutant president, revealed to be Kamala, and recruits Ms. Marvel into the team for her protection. Unbeknownst to the team, Cable suspects one of the other members of X-Force – Archangel, Boom-Boom and Hellverine – to be Kamala's future assassin. The storyline culminates in Kamala assuming a leadership role when Cable is revealed to be the assassin under the control of a sentient bioweapon, helping X-Force prevent her future self's assassination.

In September 2026, Marvel announced Fugitive X-Force, a five-issue follow-up series written by Seeley and illustrated by Áthila Fabbio, scheduled to debut in December. The series follows Kamala and her teammates as they go on the run after being framed for a crime, with Boom-Boom assuming leadership following Cable's disappearance.

== Reception ==
=== Cultural reaction ===
Marvel's 2013 announcement of Kamala Khan drew a widespread online reaction. Fatemeh Fakhraie, founder of Muslimah Media Watch (a diversity advocacy group), told Al Jazeera America that "she is going to be a window into the American Muslim experience" and she "normalizes this idea of the American experience as Muslim". Brett White of Comic Book Resources said, "With Kamala Khan, the daughter of Pakistani immigrants living in Jersey City, Marvel Comics has shown yet again that it wants to include groups of the American population that have yet to be personally inspired by their heroes". Hussein Rashid, writing for CNN, said: "The character of Kamala Khan has the opportunity to offer something new to pop-culture portrayals of Muslims. She is born in the United States, appears to be part of the post-9/11 generation and is a teenager". Muaaz Khan of The Guardian compared Kamala to Malala Yousafzai, and the entertainment industry should follow Marvel's example.

Leon Moosavi of the University of Liverpool felt that the character's family would reinforce the stereotype of restrictive Muslim parents, and her shape-shifting ability resembled several anti-Muslim stereotypes (especially taqiyya: a legal dispensation whereby a believing individual can deny their faith or commit illegal or blasphemous acts while at risk of significant persecution). Political satirist Stephen Colbert, parodying right-wing commentators on The Colbert Report, said: "A Muslim cannot be a superhero — for Pete's sake they're on the no-fly list". Conan O'Brien tweeted a joke linking Kamala's religion to polygamy, but removed it due to a public backlash.

Kamala was received positively by students in Jersey City. At McNair Academic High School, the inspiration for the fictional school Kamala attends, Class of 2025 student Shreeya Shankerdas founded the Coles Kamala Korps (named for Kamala's fictional school). Shankerdas said, "When I first heard about Ms. Marvel being this brown teenage girl, I thought it was really cool that we're finally represented. On top of that, we were represented in the Marvel Universe, and I thought that was really cool, because it's a big company."

=== Critical reaction ===
==== 2014–2019 ====
Meagan Damore of Comic Book Resources said, "There is nothing not to love about Ms. Marvel #1: every character is well formed and distinct; the story, lovingly crafted; the art, meticulously planned and—at times—downright funny". Jen Aprahamian of Comic Vine said, "Ms. Marvel makes a delightful debut, showing confidence and heart even before she puts on a mask. Kamala is not your average superheroine and her stories seem like they're headed in an exciting direction. Kudos to Marvel for expanding its range; amping up the diversity factor in a way that doesn't feel token or temporary is a great move, and Ms. Marvel is launching with a solid first issue and a world—a universe, even—of story possibilities". Joshua Yehl of IGN said, "Ms. Marvel introduces a vibrant and troubled character that you can't help but love". George Marston of Newsarama said, "Ms. Marvel is a solid debut issue, and that in itself should be a victory not just for G. Willow Wilson and Adrian Alphona, but for Marvel Comics itself ... It's not exactly edgy, and Kamala Khan is not exactly the first reluctant teen hero in Marvel's long history, but Ms. Marvel is one of the strongest debuts for a new character that Marvel has had in a long time".

In 2016, USA Today said that Kamala "broke onto the comics scene a few years ago and has since stolen awards, sales and, oh right, our hearts. Her solo comics, written by G. Willow Wilson, are entertaining and fly off the page, and her appearances elsewhere have only increased". Alex Abad-Santos, for Vox, wrote that "Wilson and Alphona imbue the comic with grace while steering clear of 'after-school special'-of-the-month types of stories [...] As you see Kamala slowly figure out the ways of superheroism and the balance of her own life, you can't help but feel like she represents an alternate path that can save us from the ugly stuff threatening to strangle our hope, our joy, and our love. That's why superheroes were first created, and it's why Ms. Marvel is one of the greatest heroes of our generation".

Katie M. Logan, for Salon in 2017, said that Kamala "signals an important development in cultural representations of Muslim-Americans [...] Kamala Khan is precisely the hero America needs today, but not because of a bat sign in the sky or any single definitive image. She is, above all, committed to the idea that every member of her faith, her generation and her city has value and that their lives should be respected and protected". Joshua Davison, for Bleeding Cool in 2018, wrote that "Ms. Marvel #31 is the landmark 50th issue of Kamala's beloved series. G. Willow Wilson never ceases to amaze me at how she can have me invested in mundane activities like a sleepover. This is done through a good balance of endearing characters, solid drama, and the quirks and detours one can expect from a superhero comic [...] Mix that with some talented artists, and you have a book well worth recommending".

In a 2018 review of the series, the Wisconsin Muslim Journal said that the story "is a rare burst of authenticity in what can so easily become clichéd and cheap. In short, [Kamala] has a refreshing amount of depth". Academics Scott T. Smith and José Alaniz highlighted in the book Uncanny Bodies: Superhero Comics and Disability (2019) that scenes of Kamala initially struggling with her body-morphing powers have been read by scholars "as allegories of the struggle for assimilation by racial and religious others, yet what also stands out is the portrait of an unruly body". They commented that "many lionize the new Ms. Marvel as an icon of diversity, feminism, and girl power, but not of the disabled (though her body mutations would seem right at home among the Doom Patrol, as her powers to some extent mimic those of Elasti-Girl/Farr), reminds us of the resistance many still feel toward disability as an identity category. Yet an intersectional disability studies emphasizes how Khan's self-acceptance—however spectacularly 'freakish' she may appear—also extends to a demand for acceptance from others, that the world itself come to see hers, too, as a superheroic body".

==== 2019–2022 ====
===== The Magnificent Ms. Marvel =====
Joshua Yehl of IGN included The Magnificent Ms. Marvel on its list of "Best Comic Book Series of 2019". Charlie Ridgely of ComicBook.com wrote that The Magnificent Ms. Marvel was "an incredible challenge" for Ahmed since he had to follow Wilson, the character's creator. Ridgely said, "Ahmed has leaned hard into the issues that plague our current lives while still making the comic uplifting", and "every revelation that Kamala comes to is thoroughly earned and [based] on the specific experiences we see her confront. It's a master class in evolving a character while keeping them grounded in their own identity".

===== Death in 2019 =====
Kamala's death and subsequent resurrection via Miles Morales' agreement with the devil Mephisto in Champions vol. 3 1–2 (January–February 2019) was criticized by Bam Smack Pow for the lack of intended follow-up in Kamala's solo series The Magnificent Ms. Marvel, calling out "learning that one of her best friends accidentally traded an innocent life for hers via a deal with the devil [as] the sort of trauma which really should be followed up upon", while overall praising the "emotional gut-wrenching [conversation] between Kamala and Miles" about life and death. Vishal Gullapalli, in a review of Champions Vol. 1: Beat the Devil for AIPT, also criticized the Mephisto plot line as "the entire core premise of it is built on fridging — first Kamala and Viv die with very little agency in their story, which requires Miles and Amadeus to save them. Their corpses are shown as a way to drive home the horror of what has happened, but it is also a scene of two women who died to provide emotional angst for the men around them". Gullapalli commented that "Kamala does get agency in the story as it continues, which is what saves the story" and Kamala is a character who writer Zub focuses on resulting in "good development, as Kamala steps into her role as the team leader and all the duties that entails".

===== Beyond the Limit =====
Avery Kaplan, in her review of Ms. Marvel: Beyond the Limit for The Beat, wrote: "Beyond the Limit was a fun and interesting story that went to some unexpected places, all while allowing Kamala plenty of time to shine (and to make a lot of funny food jokes)". Kaplan added, "Issue five brings the main conflict to a satisfactory enough close while promising further explanation in a sequel series (which I guess is an alternative to an ongoing series, probably based on the idea that marketing five-issue arcs which are subsequently collected into graphic novel-style TPB collections is easier than getting new readers to jump on at issue #546 – whatever, just give me more Kamala)".

==== 2023–present ====
===== Death in 2023 =====
Kamala's death in The Amazing Spider-Man vol. 5 #26 (May 2023) was criticized after several low-resolution pages leaked before the issue's publication. Both Joe Grunenwald of The Beat and James Whitbrook of Io9 commented on the character's increased popularity following her onscreen appearance in the television show Ms. Marvel and that Kamala's death was occurring in another headliner's book at time when the character doesn't have her own series. Whitbrook wrote, "killing off such a prominent and influentially representative character at all, even temporarily—let alone not as part of a publisher-wide event or even in her own comic, but instead a book where she is an infrequent supporting guest character—is a move that is just as likely going to have fans reacting in anger as it is going to draw attention through shock". Grunenwald stated that "having her die in ASM feels like an afterthought, and smacks of fridging the character for the sake of making headliner Peter Parker sad". George Marston of GamesRadar+ highlighted that the marketing for The Amazing Spider-Man had been hyping an "impending death" for months and that Kamala's death feels like "an opportunistic bait-and-switch" as she hadn't been the central focus of the current storyline; Marston commented that this could also be setting up "a potential ratings bump" when Kamala is resurrected.

Marston asserted that Marvel comics have a current trend "of killing off characters who are about to star in upcoming films [...], only to give them a big, triumphant return to coincide with their new movie or series". Rich Johnston, for Bleeding Cool, wrote that Zeb Wells is not only the writer of this run of The Amazing Spider-Man but also "one of the writers of The Marvels movie. He knows, in this regard at least, exactly what he is doing". Johnston also highlighted that while Kamala is an Inhuman in the comics, she is a mutant in the MCU; he speculated that the character could be brought back in the comics as mutant if the "Resurrection Protocols of Krakoa" are used on Kamala as these protocols were "recently extended to certain select humans on a charitable basis". Susana Polo, for Polygon, commented that while there are great superhero death stories in a genre that expects resurrection, "when it's the death of a rather popular character who has her first blockbuster film coming out this fall — it breaks the kayfabe, so to speak". Polo stated "it's cruel to play shenanigans with an audience that has very few Muslim superheroes, much less Muslim superheroes known outside of comics, to go around (or teen girl superheroes, for that matter). It's telling that the character's death is already inspiring celebratory racist reactions on social media. This does not seem like a plot hook for Kamala Khan fans, which makes Marvel's copy — about the glory of Kamala's apparent upcoming heroic sacrifice — ring particularly hollow".

Fallen Friend: The Death of Ms. Marvel (2023) received mixed reviews – Chase Magnett of ComicBook.com called it a success "in fitting fashion" and a "stirring tribute" while David Brooke of AIPT rated it a 6/10 and stated "it's far too little and maybe too late". The critics highlighted the use of Kamala's religion in her funeral with the comic structured around completing a "khatm quran". Magnett stated that the issue is "a poignant reflection on the loss of a human being so young. Each of the assembled creative teams build upon their connections to the character and what she embodies in order to say something of value". Brooke wrote that the issue captures "the pulse of key characters who Ms. Marvel touched" and that "the story feels like a good way to honor Kamala by showing us how her friends are reeling, but there isn't much to it either". He commented that "with the character's revival assured, we have a comic that shows important Muslim culture but little else". Cy Beltran, for The Beat, stated that "the first two stories were solid and moving, while the last felt out of sync with the rest of the issue, both for its decentering of Kamala and the strange Spider-Man epilogue. The comic felt incomplete because of this, but the earlier two stories captured the spirit of two long-concluded runs in a way that felt enriching to long-time fans and impactful for those just coming into this world".

In a 2024 podcast interview, Miles Morales: Spider-Man writer Cody Ziglar, who featured Kamala as a supporting character in his run after her resurrection, alleged that The Amazing Spider-Man writer Zeb Wells recounted to him that the decision to kill off and resurrect Kamala as mutant was mandated by Marvel Studios president Kevin Feige. However a spokesperson for Marvel clarified that the decision to make Kamala a mutant, not to kill her off, was explicitly an editorial decision made long before the release of The Amazing Spider-Man #26 and denied Feige's involvement with the process.

===== The New Mutant and Mutant Menace =====
In her review of Ms. Marvel: The New Mutant, Lia Williamson of AIPT praised Iman Vellani's handling of the character's new status quo as "[her] knowledge and love for the character allow her to make lemonade out of the lemons she's been given"; Williamson opined that Vellani's "robust love and passion" for Kamala Khan "shines throughout her writing". Alex Schlesinger, also for AIPT, called Mutant Menace #4 "a perfect end to Ms. Marvel's role in the X-Men's Krakoan Age" with a rating of 9.5 out of 10. Schlesinger commented that:

Vellani is a Marvel superfan, so she knows how important Kamala's identity and power set are to her readers, and her and Pirzada do a wonderful job of introducing Ms. Marvel's MCU ability while keeping her polymorph powers. [...] This is often the best a fan can hope for when MCU synergy induces changes in comics canon. Kamala's past, present, and future are all still grounded in her origin and development, just now her character in the films appears more aligned with her comic twin.

Schlesinger also praised the art and coloring by Scott Godlewski and Erick Arciniega – "from Medusa's epic hair to Kamala's terrifying spasms, and the tragic death of Abdullah, the pair of artists ground the excellent writing". Evan Valentine of ComicBook.com rated the issue a 4 out of 5, and thought that the miniseries "introduces some interesting character work alongside a more interesting status quo for the future". Valentine commented that the issue shows Kamala is "just as much mutant as she is Inhuman, and the creative team does a solid job in balancing these two aspects of the character as Kamala struggles with an unnerving problem in her cellular structure. Mutant Menace feels like one of the strongest offerings for Kamala in quite some time, creating interesting hooks for the character along with a deep dive into the Marvel Universe along the way".

===== NYX and Giant-Size X-Men =====
Kamala Khan's portrayal in NYX and the subsequent Giant-Size X-Men storyline, both written by Collin Kelly and Jackson Lanzing, received mixed reviews. ComicsXF praised the writers' characterization of Kamala in NYX, particularly her enthusiasm, confidence as a superhero, and developing friendship with Sophie Cuckoo. Jenna Anderson of ComicBook.com similarly praised her relationship with Sophie, although she considered the series' debut issue somewhat shallow.

Reception to Giant-Size X-Men was more divided. Megan Nichole of Nerd Initiative praised Kamala's optimism and the emotional depth she brought to the storyline, while ComicsXF questioned the decision to insert her into pivotal events from mutant history.

===== Inglorious X-Force =====
Kamala's portrayal in Inglorious X-Force received mixed reviews. Jonathan Waugh of AIPT praised her characterization and emergence as a leader in the series finale, although he felt she had been underutilized in earlier issues. GateCrashers praised Kamala's optimism as a contrast to the team's darker personalities but criticized the storyline surrounding her future presidency. Conversely, Logan Mullins of Comic Watch praised Tim Seeley's portrayal of Kamala's narrative voice but criticized her lack of meaningful character development throughout the series.

=== Accolades ===
Year	Award	Category	Winner/Nominee	Result	Ref.
2015	Hugo Award	Best Graphic Story	Ms. Marvel Volume 1: No Normal	Won	
2015	Eisner Award	New Series	Ms. Marvel, by G. Willow Wilson & Adrian Alphona	Nominated	
2015	Eisner Award	Writer	G. Willow Wilson, Ms. Marvel	Nominated	
2015	Eisner Award	Penciller/inker	Adrian Alphona, Ms. Marvel	Nominated	
2015	Eisner Award	Cover artist	Jamie McKelvie/Matthew Wilson, The Wicked + The Divine; Ms. Marvel	Nominated	
2015	Eisner Award	Lettering	Joe Caramagna, Ms. Marvel, Daredevil	Nominated	
2015	Harvey Award	Best New Series	Ms. Marvel, Marvel Comics	Nominated	
2015	Harvey Award	Best Writer	G. Willow Wilson, Ms. Marvel, Marvel Comics	Nominated	
2015	Joe Shuster Award	Outstanding Artist	Adrian Alphona, Ms. Marvel	Won	
2015	Dwayne McDuffie Award for Diversity in Comics	Dwayne McDuffie Award for Diversity in Comics	Ms. Marvel by G. Willow Wilson and Adrian Alphona	Nominated	
2016	Angoulême International Comics Festival	Prize for a Series	Ms. Marvel, by Adrian Alphona and G. Willow Wilson	Won	
2016	Eisner Award	Best Writer	G. Willow Wilson, Ms. Marvel	Nominated	
2016	Harvey Award	Best Writer	G. Willow Wilson, Ms. Marvel, Marvel Comics	Nominated	
2016	Dragon Award	Best Comic Book	Ms. Marvel	Won	
2016	Dwayne McDuffie Award for Diversity in Comics		Ms. Marvel by G. Willow Wilson and Adrian Alphona	Won	
2017	Hugo Award	Best Graphic Story	Ms. Marvel, Volume 5: Super Famous	Nominated	
2019	American Book Award		G. Willow Wilson (author), Nico Leon (illustrator), Ms. Marvel Vol. 9: Teenage Wasteland	Won	

=== Sales ===
Ms. Marvel Volume 1: No Normal was the best-selling graphic novel in October 2014; the following month, it reached No. 2 on The New York Times Best Seller list of paperback graphic books. In April 2015, Ms. Marvel Volume 2: Generation Why debuted at #4 on The New York Times Best Seller list of paperback graphic books. In July 2015, Ms. Marvel Volume 3: Crushed debuted at #3 on The New York Times Best Seller list of paperback graphic books. Ms. Marvel Volume 5: Super Famous debuted at #3 on the July 2016 The New York Times Best Seller list of paperback graphic books. By August 2018, Ms. Marvel had sold half a million trade paperbacks, in addition to digital sales.

During a slump in Marvel's 2017 market share, senior vice president of print, sales, and marketing David Gabriel "blamed declining comic-book sales on the studio's efforts to increase diversity and female characters". Gabriel then attempted to walk-back the statement. George Gustines, for The New York Times, said that "the issue is more nuanced"; sales are also impacted by numbering restarts and fan opinion about storylines. Gustines wrote that in February 2017, Ms. Marvel "sold an estimated 19,870 copies. It landed at 109 out of the top 300 comics for the month. But the series is known to be doing well digitally and with collected editions. There are also other signs of prestige. This week, a collected edition of the series, 'Ms. Marvel: Super Famous,' written by G. Willow Wilson and illustrated by Takeshi Miyazawa, was nominated for a Hugo Award, which is given to the best science-fiction or fantasy stories". Later that year, during Marvel's Legacy initiative, many titles featuring "diverse and new voices" were cancelled. On the survival of the series, Joe Glass of Bleeding Cool wrote that Ms. Marvel's periodical sales were only slightly higher than many of the cancelled titles; however, "it could be down to trades sales. It is generally held that these books survive on the popularity of their trades sales, not just in the direct market and local comic shops, but in book stores across the world" and at "Scholastic [book] fairs and the like". Associate professor at Northumbria University and comics scholar Mel Gibson said that Ms. Marvel "absolutely leapt in sales to what could be considered non-traditional comic book readers – such as females, Muslims, or Pakistani-Americans for example. The idea of who reads comics and how they read them was changing. It helped draw in new folk and diversify the fan base".

The hardcover collection Ms. Marvel Volume 1 and Volume 2, which collected the 2014–2015 run and non-MM appearances, made the top 10 of Diamond's Top 500 Selling Graphic Novels charts (Note: Note: This monthly sales chart no longer includes sales of DC titles, since DC Comics left Diamond Comic Distributors in July 2020.) for September 2020; volume 1 reached number five, and volume 2 reached number nine on the charts. In September 2021, Ms. Marvel Volume 1: No Normal (2014) was number 11 on the NPD BookScan's top 20 Superheroes Graphic Novels Chart. (Note: Note: The NPD Group says that its BookScan "covers approximately 85 percent of trade print books sold in the U.S., through direct reporting from all major retailers, including Amazon, Barnes & Noble, Walmart, Target, independent bookstores, and many others".)

== Cultural impact ==
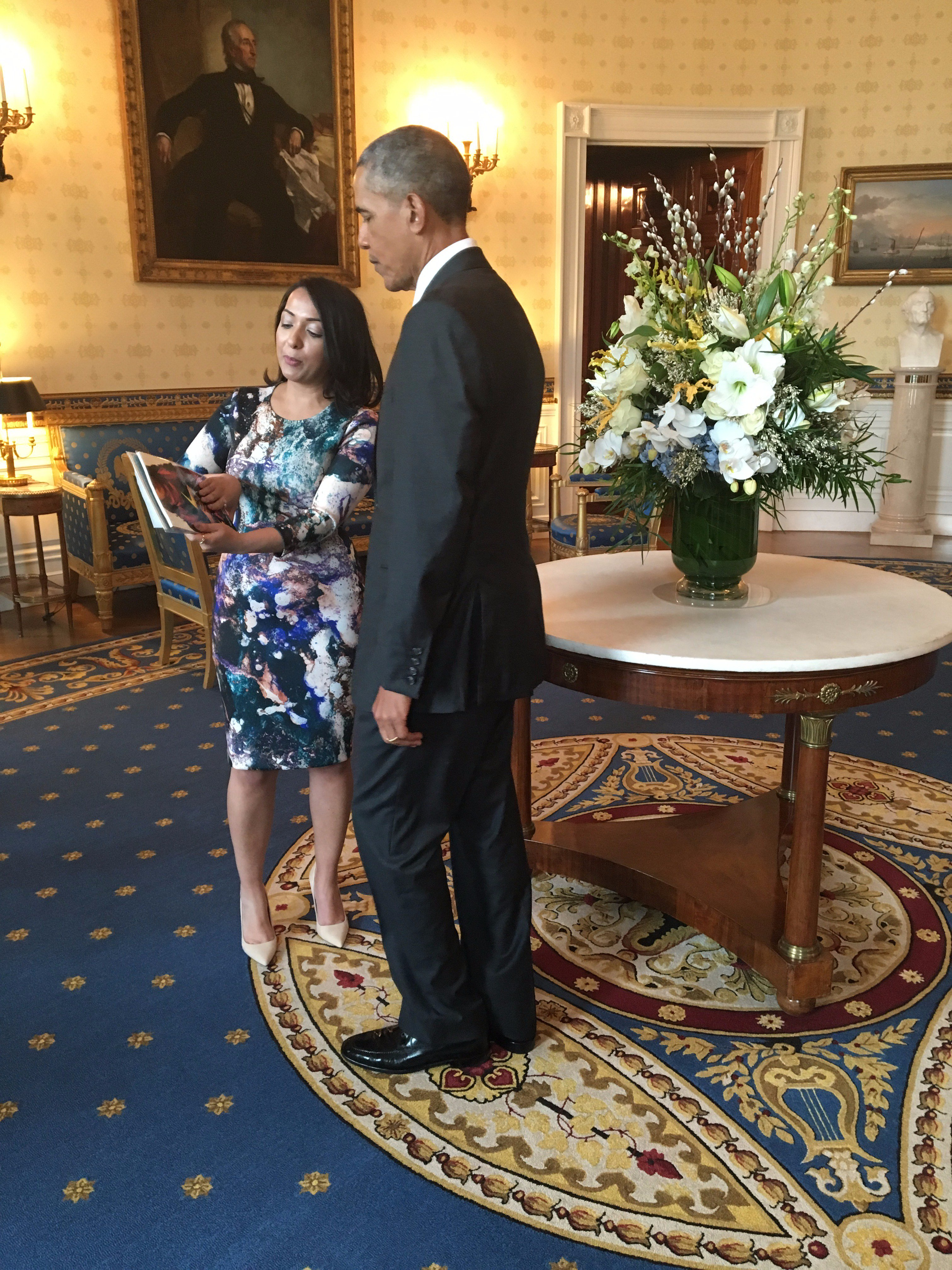
Creator Sana Amanat presenting Barack Obama a copy of Ms. Marvel Vol. 1 in the Blue Room of the White House during a reception for Women's History Month.

In January 2015, images of Kamala began appearing over anti-Islamic advertisements on San Francisco city buses. The advertisements, purchased by the American Freedom Defense Initiative, equated Islam with Nazism. Street artists covered the ads with images of Kamala and messages such as "Calling all Bigotry Busters", "Stamp out racism", "Free speech isn't a license to spread hate", "Islamophobia hurts us all", and "Racist". About the response, Wilson tweeted, "Some amazing person has been painting over the anti-Muslim bus ads in SF with Ms. Marvel graffiti ... To me, the graffiti is part of the back-and-forth of the free speech conversation. Call and response. Argument, counterargument".

Sana Amanat was introduced to United States President Barack Obama at a March 2016 reception celebrating Women's History Month at the White House. In his opening remarks, Obama said: "Ms. Marvel may be your comic book creation, but I think for a lot of young boys and girls, Sana's a real superhero".

Kamala appeared on the cover of The Village Voice in an October 2016 illustration by Autumn Whitehearst which paid homage to J. Howard Miller's "We Can Do It!" poster. The cover was accompanied by "The Super Hero For Our Times: Ms. Marvel Will Save You Now", an article by Mallika Rao which profiled Wilson and focused on the increasing diversity of comic-book characters, creators, and fans.

In March 2018, Merriam-Webster added 850 words to its dictionary. This included the word "Embiggen", which first appeared in The Simpsons episode "Lisa the Iconoclast" (1996) and was popularized in Ms. Marvel as an exclamation by Kamala when using her shape-shifting powers.

Ms. Marvel cosplayers
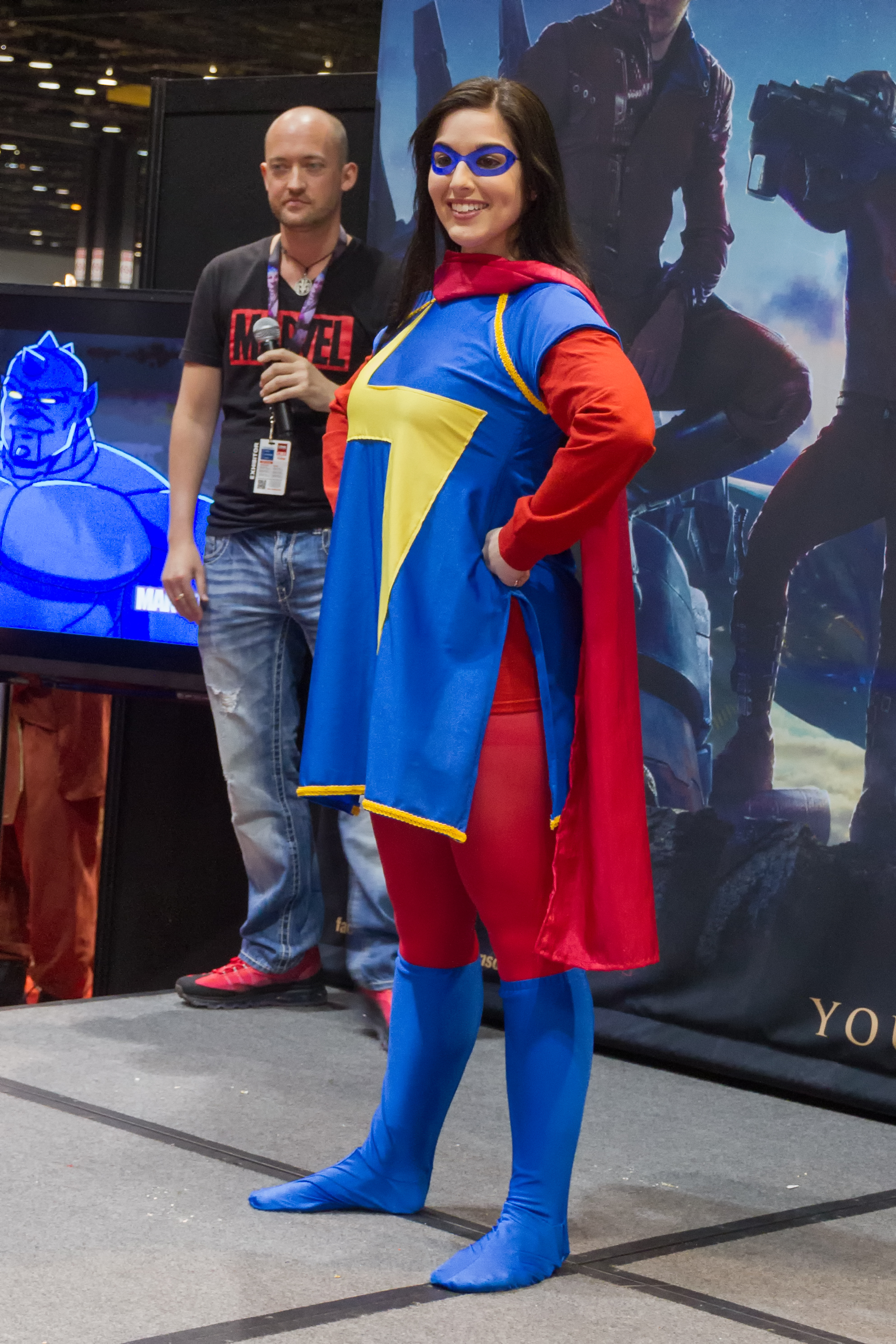
Cosplay at C2E2 in April 2014

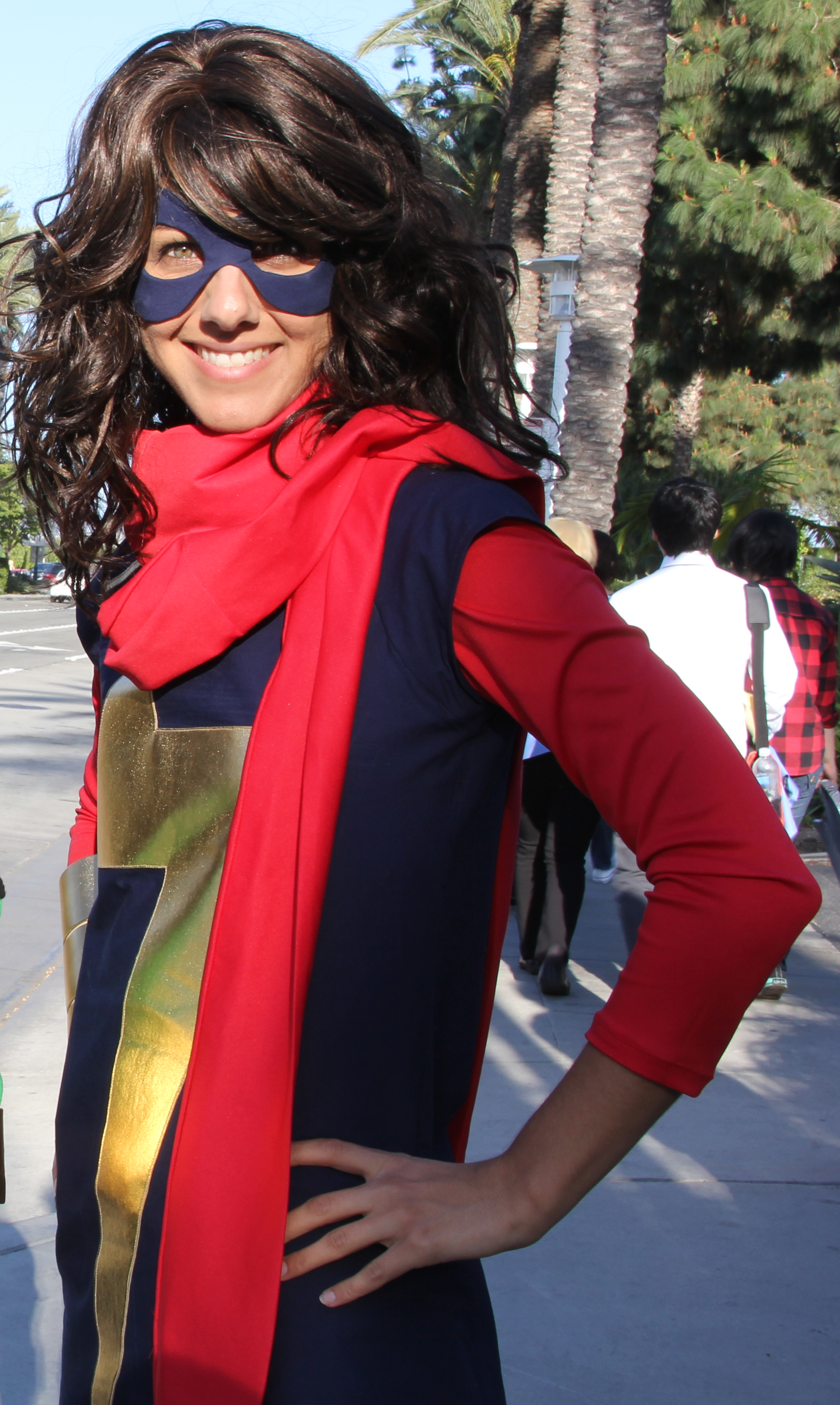
Cosplay at WonderCon in April 2015

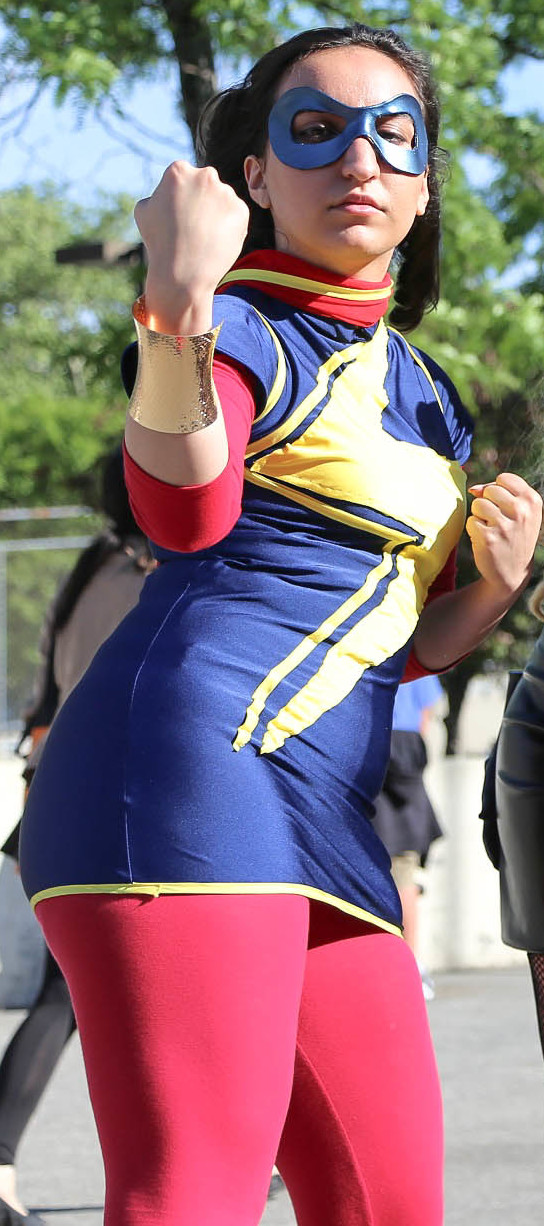
Cosplay at Special Edition NYC in June 2015

== Other versions ==
=== Agent Khan ===
An older version of Kamala, referred to as Agent Khan, appears in Inhumans: Attilan Rising by Charles Soule and John Timms as part of the 2015 "Secret Wars" storyline, which details Black Bolt's rebellion against Queen Medusa of New Attilan. In her review of Inhumans: Attilan Rising #2, Emma Houxbois of The Rainbow Hub said: "While [Kamala has] had a few chances to shine in the core Inhuman book, her reintroduction (complete with character redesign by Dave Johnson and strong line work by John Timms) packs a real punch. Soule's evolution of her powers and costume will hopefully also coincide with further opportunities later in the story to learn more about her views on the resistance and reasons for supporting Attilan – solidifying this version of Kamala as a comparatively matured hero forced to make difficult moral choices".

=== Kamala Carrelli ===
A future version of Kamala, a widow named Kamala Carrelli (née Khan), known by the vigilante name Khan after her maiden name, appears as a member of the Exiles with the Unseen, Blink, Iron Lad, Valkyrie, and a chibi-style cartoon version of Wolverine in a series by writer Saladin Ahmed and artist Javier Rodriguez which debuted in April 2018 and concluded in March 2019. From Earth-81111, a reality where the events of Inhumans vs. X-Men lead to a Third World War, Khan joins the titular team sometime after her husband's and daughter's murder by Sabretooth.

=== President Khan ===
Another future version of the character appears in All-New Wolverine #33 (April 2018) by Tom Taylor and Ramon Rosanas as part of the "Old Woman Laura" storyline as the future President of the United States of Earth-18366, who, some time after fighting in the Doom World War, retired as Ms. Marvel to enter politics. Kieran Shiach of Comic Book Resources said, "Kamala as President of the United States makes a lot of sense. She's smart, resourceful and cares about her community ... It also helps solidify the world of 'Old Woman Laura' as a 'good future,' presenting a President who is both a woman and Muslim as a possibility within our lifetime".

=== Kamala Kang ===
During the 2018 "Infinity Wars" storyline, there is a Warp World version of Kamala Khan who is amalgamated with Kang the Conqueror where she is known as Kamala Kang. CBR commented that in this storyline "Kamala was exposed to Chronogen Mists – which warped her perception of the universe and gave her the ability to 'embiggen her cosmic perspective,' effectively allowing her to stretch across the course of time and space".

=== Captain Krakoa ===
A future version of Kamala Khan appears in the Rise of the Powers of X (January 2024) miniseries by writer Kieron Gillen and artist R.B. Silva at the end of the "Fall of X" relaunch. Set ten years into an alternate future where Orchis is victorious against mutantkind, Kamala dons the suit and mantle of Captain Krakoa and is part of the surviving X-Men. On this change in identity, Gillen commented that:

Everyone gets a dark future when they join the X-Men. [...] When you have a character who's beloved by so many people, including me, taking them and putting them in this different position means you want to do good by them. When you're showing a little older version of a teenage hero, you want to show they're a great person. [...] Writing her as a slightly older leader, you see bits of her personality as it is now still there, but you also get the person who can do their taxes better.

=== Herald of Galactus ===
In the anthology one shot Marvel 85th Anniversary Special, the still alive Wolverine and Deadpool's floating head are exploring a superhero museum in the 85th century as they observe various superhero artifacts; one of the artifacts is Ms. Marvel's cosmically powered scarf which allowed her to travel through the cosmos as the Herald of Galactus. In this possible future, an older version of Kamala has retired from superhero life and settled down with her husband, child, and Lockjaw until Captain America recruits her for an important assignment; Kamala is shown to be using both her Inhuman embiggening powers and her mutant hard light powers together. Galactus agrees to spare Earth in exchange for Kamala serving as his Herald like the Silver Surfer before her; Kamala searches for planets for Galactus to consume "without harming any sentient life in the process". Kamala finds a seemingly abandoned planet for Galactus but discovers a small settlement of aliens living there just as he arrives. Kamala is able to evacuate the planet before Galactus consumes it; with their deal fulfilled, Galactus releases Kamala from his service.

== Collections ==
Trade paperbacks
Title	Material collected	Publication date	ISBN	Ref.
Volume One
Ms. Marvel Volume 1: No Normal	Ms. Marvel vol. 3 #1–5, material from All-New Marvel Now! Point One	October 15, 2014	978-0785190219	
Ms. Marvel Volume 2: Generation Why	Ms. Marvel vol. 3 #6–11	March 18, 2015	978-0785190226	
Ms. Marvel Volume 3: Crushed	Ms. Marvel vol. 3 #12–15, material from SHIELD #2	June 10, 2015	978-0785192275	
Ms. Marvel Volume 4: Last Days	Ms. Marvel vol. 3 #16–19, material from The Amazing Spider-Man vol. 3 #7–8	November 18, 2015	978-0785197362	
Volume Two
Ms. Marvel Volume 5: Super Famous	Ms. Marvel vol. 4 #1–6	June 22, 2016	978-0785196112	
Ms. Marvel Volume 6: Civil War II	Ms. Marvel vol. 4 #7–12	December 14, 2016	978-0785196129	
Ms. Marvel Volume 7: Damage Per Second	Ms. Marvel vol. 4 #13–18	July 19, 2017	978-1302903053	
Ms. Marvel Volume 8: Mecca	Ms. Marvel vol. 4 #19–24	December 13, 2017	978-1302906085	
Ms. Marvel Volume 9: Teenage Wasteland	Ms. Marvel vol 4 #25–30	July 31, 2018	978-1302910785	
Ms. Marvel Volume 10: Time and Again	Ms. Marvel vol 4 #31–38	March 27, 2019	978-1302912697	
The Magnificent Ms. Marvel
Ms. Marvel by Saladin Ahmed Vol. 1: Destined	The Magnificent Ms. Marvel #1–6	October 16, 2019	978-1302918293	
Ms. Marvel By Saladin Ahmed Vol. 2: Stormranger	The Magnificent Ms. Marvel #7–12	April 1, 2020	978-1302918309	
Ms. Marvel by Saladin Ahmed Vol. 3: Outlawed	The Magnificent Ms. Marvel #13-18	May 5, 2021	978-1302925000	
Limited series
Ms. Marvel Team-Up	Marvel Team-Up vol. 4 #1-6	November 27, 2019	978-1-302-91831-6	
Ms. Marvel: Beyond the Limit	Ms. Marvel: Beyond the Limit #1-5	June 28, 2022	978-1302931261	
Ms. Marvel: Fists Of Justice	Ms. Marvel & Wolverine #1, Ms. Marvel & Moon Knight #1 and Ms. Marvel & Venom #1	January 18, 2023	978-1-302-94838-2	
Ms. Marvel: The New Mutant	Ms. Marvel: The New Mutant #1-4	March 19, 2024	9781302954901	
Ms. Marvel: The New Mutant	Ms. Marvel: Mutant Menace #1-4	November 5, 2024	9781302958855	

Hardcovers
Title	Material collected	Publication date	ISBN	Ref.
Ms. Marvel Volume 1	Ms. Marvel vol. 3 #1–11, material from All-New Marvel Now! Point One	August 25, 2015	978-0785198284	
Ms. Marvel Volume 2	Ms. Marvel vol. 3 #12–19, Annual 1, The Amazing Spider-Man vol. 3 #7–8	April 19, 2016	978-0785198369	
Ms. Marvel Volume 3	Ms. Marvel vol 4. #1–12	June 27, 2017	978-1302903619	
Ms. Marvel Volume 4	Ms. Marvel vol 4. #13–24	June 26, 2018	978-1302909130	
Ms. Marvel Volume 5	Ms. Marvel vol 4. #25–38	August 27, 2019	978-1302917357	

Omnibuses and other collections
Title	Material collected	Publication date	ISBN	Ref.
Omnibus
Ms. Marvel Omnibus Volume 1	Ms. Marvel vol. 3 #1–19, Annual 1, The Amazing Spider-Man vol. 3 #7–8, S.H.I.E.L.D. #2 and material from All-New Marvel Now! Point One	November 2, 2016	978-1302902018	
Magnificent Ms. Marvel Omnibus Vol. 1	The Magnificent Ms. Marvel #1-12, Ms. Marvel Annual #1	November 1, 2021	978-1846533280	
Graphic-novel trade paperbacks
Ms Marvel: Kamala Khan	Ms. Marvel vol. 3 #1–11 and material from All-New Marvel Now! Point One	February 19, 2019	978-1302916404	
Ms Marvel: Metamorphosis	Ms. Marvel vol. 3 #12–19, S.H.I.E.L.D. (2014) #2 and material from The Amazing Spider-Man (2014) #7–8	June 25, 2019	978-1302918088	
Ms. Marvel Meets the Marvel Universe	Ms. Marvel vol. 3 #6–9, #17–18, S.H.I.E.L.D. (2014) #2, Moon Girl and Devil Dinosaur (2015) #10, Champions (2016) #1, material from The Amazing Spider-Man (2014) 7–8 and material from Free Comic Book Day 2015 (Avengers) #1	May 12, 2020	978-1302923624	
Ms. Marvel: Army of One	Ms. Marvel vol. 4 #1-12	February 10, 2021	978-1302923631	
Ms. Marvel: Game Over	Ms. Marvel vol. 4 #13-24	September 8, 2021	978-1302929862	
Ms. Marvel: Something New	Ms. Marvel vol. 4 #25-35	October 12, 2021	978-1302931674	
Ms. Marvel: Generations	Ms. Marvel vol. 4 #36-38, Generations: Ms. Marvel & Ms. Marvel, Marvel Team-Up (2019) #1-6	October 12, 2022	978-1302945299	
Marvel-Verse: Ms. Marvel	Ms. Marvel vol. 3 #12, Generations: Ms. Marvel & Ms. Marvel #1, Ms. Marvel vol. 4 #38, and Miles Morales: Spider-Man #24. (Note: 6" x 9" format aimed at middle-grade readers.)	August 16, 2022	9781302947811	
Scholastic's Graphix line
Ms. Marvel: Stretched Thin		September 7, 2021	978-1-338-72258-1	

== In other media ==
Marvel creative consultant Joe Quesada said in September 2016 that Ms. Marvel would appear in "other media" because of the character's success, which "doesn't happen a lot" and probably would not have happened ten years earlier.

=== Animation ===
- Kamala Khan appears in Avengers Assemble, voiced by Kathreen Khavari. This version is a founding member of the All-New, All-Different Avengers.
- Kamala Khan appears in Marvel Future Avengers, voiced by Akari Kitō in Japanese and again by Kathreen Khavari in English.
- Kamala Khan appears in the Marvel Rising franchise, voiced again by Kathreen Khavari.
- Kamala Khan appears in Spider-Man, voiced again by Kathreen Khavari.
- Kamala Khan appears in Marvel Super Hero Adventures, voiced by Aliza Vellani.
- Kamala Khan appears in Spidey and His Amazing Friends, voiced by Sandra Saad.

=== Live-action ===
Kamala Khan appears in media set in the Marvel Cinematic Universe (MCU), portrayed by Iman Vellani:

- Introduced in a self-titled miniseries (2022), this version wields a magical bangle which unlocks her the ability to harness cosmic energy and create glowing constructs out of hard light. In the final episode, "No Normal", Kamala is described as having a "mutation" unrelated to her powers.
- Vellani reprised her role as Kamala in The Marvels (2023).
- Kamala appears in Marvel Zombies (2025), voiced by Vellani.

=== Video games ===
- Kamala Khan appears as an unlockable playable character in Marvel Puzzle Quest.
- Kamala Khan appears in Marvel Avengers Alliance.
- Kamala Khan appears in Lego Marvel's Avengers, voiced by Ashly Burch.
- Kamala Khan appears in Marvel Avengers Academy, voiced by Priyanka Chopra.
- Kamala Khan appears in Marvel: Future Fight.
- Kamala Khan appears in Marvel Contest of Champions.
- Kamala Khan appears as a playable character in Lego Marvel Super Heroes 2, voiced by Rebecca Kiser.
- Kamala Khan appears in Marvel Strike Force.
- Kamala Khan appears in Marvel Heroes, voiced by Erica Luttrell.
- Kamala Khan appears in Zen Pinball 2 as part of the "Women of Power" DLC pack.
- Kamala Khan appears in Marvel Ultimate Alliance 3: The Black Order, voiced again by Kathreen Khavari.
- Kamala Khan appears in Marvel's Avengers, voiced and motion-captured by Sandra Saad.
- Kamala Khan appears as a playable character in the Arc System Works fighting game Marvel Tōkon: Fighting Souls, voiced by Honoka Kuroki in Japanese and Dalia Rooni in English. She is a member of Amazing Guardians, led by Spider-Man (Peter Parker), alongside their teammates Star-Lord and Peni Parker.

=== Miscellaneous ===
GraphicAudio released the audio book Ms. Marvel: No Normal in August 2015, with the first five issues of the comic-book series. Jeff Reingold, Marvel's manager of licensed publishing, said that "The challenge here was conveying the comic visuals into a strictly audio form without the use of a third-person narrator".

In March 2016, Marvel Press announced that it would publish a 128-page chapter book entitled Ms. Marvel: Fists of Fury in October 2017. The story focuses on bullying, due to Kamala's gender and background.

Vellani also appears as Kamala / Ms. Marvel in the Disney Wish cruise ship attraction Avengers: Quantum Encounter, which debuted in July 2022. She joins the Avengers in facing a rebuilt Ultron.
