= Kamla (name) =

Kamla is a given name and surname. Notable people with the name include:

- Kamla Beniwal (1927–2024), governor of the Indian state of Gujarat, Indian independence activist, veteran politician
- Kamla Bhatt, Indian blogger acclaimed as India's first podcaster
- Kamla Chaudhry (1908–1970), Indian short story writer
- Kamla Nehru (1899–1936), wife of Jawaharlal Nehru and a freedom fighter
- Kamla Persad-Bissessar (born 1952), governor of Trinidad and Tobago, politician, educator, lawyer
- Kamla Prasad (born 1954), Indian politician for the Barabanki
- Rick Kamla (born 1969), television personality for NBA TV

== See also ==
- Kamala (name)
- Komla, given name
