= Kamali, Bushehr =

Kamali كمالي
- Village
- Location within Iran
- Coordinates: 29°51′19″N 50°31′48″E
- Country: Iran
- Province: Bushehr
- County: Ganaveh
- Bakhsh: Central
- Rural District: Hayat Davud

Population (2006)
  - Total: 47
- Time zone: UTC+3:30 (IRST)
  - Summer (DST): UTC+4:30 (IRDT)

Kamali (Persian: كمالي, also Romanized as Kamālī) is a village in Hayat Davud Rural District, in the Central District of Ganaveh County, Bushehr Province, Iran. At the 2006 census, its population was 47, in 12 families.
