= Kamala Todd =

Canadian filmmaker, community planner, and curator

Kamala Todd is a filmmaker, community planner, and curator based in Vancouver, British Columbia. She is of Métis, Cree and European descent. Her writing, films, and curatorial practice often revolves around the topic of Indigineity in Canada.

== Personal life and education ==
Although she was born and raised in Vancouver, British Columbia, Todd's family originates from both St. Paul, Alberta and Whitefish Lake, Alberta. Similarly to her mother, Loretta Todd, who was a prominent Indigenous filmmaker in Vancouver, she worked for the city while maintaining her career in film and video. Kamala Todd received her Bachelor of Arts in Geography in 1994, and completed her Master of Arts in Cultural Geography in 1999, both from the University of British Columbia.

== Career ==
From 2000–2006, Todd served as the Aboriginal Social Planner at the City of Vancouver. She has been working as an Indigenous advisor and facilitator for the past twenty years, working for various cultural organizations across Vancouver, and she currently works as the Indigenous Cultural Planner for the City of Vancouver. She has also taught at Langara College, Native Education Centre, and Simon Fraser University, teaching a wide range of topics from Aboriginal Community Development to Canadian and Media Studies.

== Films and other projects ==
Some of her notable films include Indigenous Plant Diva (2008), Cedar and Bamboo, and Sharing our Stories: the Vancouver Dialogues Project. She has also curated for the Framing History Coast Salish artworks exhibit at the Roundhouse Community Centre, Indian Summer Festival, and the Drum is Calling Festival. Her video installation artwork, Known and Unknown Trails, was produced at Kingcome Inlet to be a part of Marianne Nicolson and Althea Thauberger's exhibit, Hexsa’am: To Be Here Always, at the Morris and Helen Belkin Art Gallery.

== Awards, honours and residencies ==
- Greater Vancouver Urban Aboriginal Award for Community Leadership, 2006
- Aboriginal Arts Development Award, First Peoples' Heritage, Language and Culture Council, 2006
- National Film Board of Canada Filmmakers Assistance grant, 2003
- Canada Council for the Arts, Aboriginal Media Arts production grant, 2000
- Aboriginal Achievement Foundation youth scholarship, for media training, 1999
