= Kamal =

Kamal may refer to:

- Kamal (name), a given name and surname with multiple origins
  - Kamal (director) (Kamaluddin Mohammed Majeed), Indian film director
  - Kamal Haasan (born 1954), or Kamal, Indian actor, filmmaker, singer and politician
- Kamal (navigation), a navigational instrument for measuring latitude
- Kamal, Jhapa, a rural municipality in Nepal
- Kamal, Kalideres, a village in Indonesia
- Alfa Romeo Kamal, an SUV by Alfa Romeo
- Kamal, a race of snow demons from the continent Akavir in The Elder Scrolls; also the name of their nation

== See also ==
- Kamala (disambiguation)
- Kamali (disambiguation)
- Kamalia (disambiguation)
- Kamli (disambiguation)
- Kamahl, Australian Malaysian singer
