= Komala =

Komala may refer to:

- Komala (Pokémon), a Gen VII Normal-type Pokémon species introduced in Pokémon Sun and Moon
- Komala Party of Iranian Kurdistan, a Kurdish political party led by Abdullah Mohtadi
- Komalah (CPI), a Kurdish political party led by Ibrahim Alizade
- Komala – Reform Faction, a Kurdish political party led by Reza Kaabi
- Komalapuram, a census town in Alappuzha district in Kerala

== People with the name Komala ==
- A. P. Komala (born 1934), South Indian playback singer
- Komala Dewi (born 1989), Indonesian badminton player
- Komala Saovamala (1887–1890), Princess of Siam
- Komala Varadan, Indian classical dancer

== See also ==
- Komal (disambiguation)
- Kamala (disambiguation)
- Komla, given name
