= Solid light =

Hypothetical solid form of light

Solid light, or hard light, is a hypothetical material consisting of light in a solidified state. It primarily appears in science fiction.

It has been theorized that solid light could exist. Some experiments claim to have created solid photonic molecules by inducing strong interaction between photons. Potential applications of solid light could include logic gates for quantum computers and room-temperature superconductor development.

A team of Italian scientists published in Nature Journal in March 2025 that they have found a way to make light act like a supersolid.

== Fiction ==
Solid light appears in several video game franchises, including Halo, Portal, and Overwatch. In Portal 2, sunlight is used to create "hard light bridges", which act as solid semi-transparent walkways or barriers. In Overwatch, the fictional Vishkar Corporation uses solid light as a construction material. In Halo, solid light is the foundation of Forerunner weapons and many of their utilitarian devices like retractable bridges.

Solid holograms appear many times in the TV show Star Trek. In Red Dwarf, the character Rimmer is a hologram who obtains a "hard light drive", allowing him to become tangible. In the animated show Steven Universe, several main characters are aliens who have physical forms made out of light, with a gemstone as the only material part of their body.

In DC Comics' Green Lantern, the various Lantern Corps use solid light constructs. In Marvel Comics properties, "hard light" manifests in many forms. For example, the Marvel Cinematic Universe version of Ms. Marvel uses hard light to generate giant fists, shields, and other constructs. This concept was later applied to the comics version of Ms. Marvel, who gains the ability to generate light constructs and uses them in conjunction with her original shapeshifting abilities. The X-Men's Danger Room also utilizes hard light constructs in its simulations.

== Experiments ==
Photons, the particles that make up forms of electromagnetic radiation like light, do not normally interact with one another, but may be made to interact in a nonlinear medium.

The MIT-Harvard Center for Ultracold Atoms conducted experiments on photon interaction in the 2010s. Single photons were fired from weak lasers into a dense cloud of rubidium cooled to near absolute zero. The speed of light in the cloud was about 100,000 times slower than in a vacuum. Within the cloud, photons lost energy and gained mass. The conditions allowed photons to attract and bind to other photons, and exit the cloud as molecules. Reportedly, photon pairs were observed in 2013, and triplets in 2018.

== See also ==
- Jaynes–Cummings model
- Macroscopic quantum self-trapping
- Slow light
