= Diodorus Kamala =

Tanzanian politician and diplomat (1968–2024)

Dr Diodorus Kamala
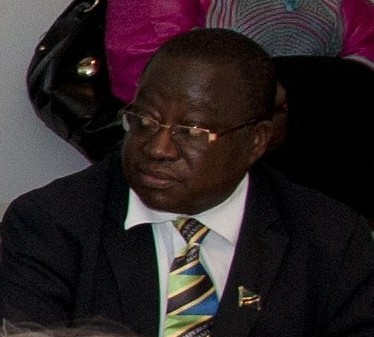

Tanzanian Ambassador to Belgium
- In office June 2012 – February 2017
- Appointed by: Jakaya Kikwete
- Succeeded by: Joseph Sokoine

Member of Parliament for Nkenge
- In office 2000–2010
- Succeeded by: Assumpter Mshama

Personal details
- Born: 26 November 1968
- Died: 12 February 2024 (aged 55) Dar es Salaam, Tanzania
- Education: University of Bradford (MSc); Mzumbe University (PhD)

Diodorus Buberwa Kamala (26 November 1968 – 12 February 2024) was a Tanzanian politician and diplomat.

== Background ==
Kamala received his doctorate in economics from Mzumbe University. His thesis was on intra-regional trade in the East African Community. Kamala died on 12 February 2024, at the age of 55.
