= Kamla Bhatt =

Indian writer

Kamla Bhatt is an Indian blogger and contributor to the IndiaTech feature on Silicon Valley's PodTech.Net. Her radio/podcast show is called Kamla Bhatt Show.

== Biography ==
The Deccan Herald, Bangalore's leading newspaper, said of her: "She has always been fascinated by people from all walks of life — be they IT czars or celebrity chefs or Bollywood stars and directors, or a driver."
