= Komal Shah (art collector) =

Indian–American art collector

- Born: Ahmedabad, Gujarat, India
- Other name: Komal Shah Garg
- Education: Gujarat University (B.S.); Stanford University (M.A.); University of California, Berkeley (M.B.A.)
- Occupations: Art collector, philanthropist, investor, business executive, computer engineer
- Known for: Shah Garg Foundation, and Shah Garg Collection
- Spouse: Gaurav Garg

Komal Shah is an Indian-born American art collector, philanthropist, business executive, and computer engineer. She is one of the most influential collectors in California and is known for her art collection, the Shah Garg Collection, which has a substantial number of female artist's work. Shah formerly worked at Oracle, Netscape, and Yahoo!. She lives in Atherton, California.

== Early life and education ==
Komal Shah was born and raised in Ahmedabad, Gujarat, India. Shah attended Gujarat University where she studied Computer Engineering (B.S. degree 1991). She came to the United States to continue her schooling in 1991. Shah has a master's degree at Stanford University, and MBA degree from the Haas School of Business at the University of California, Berkeley.

== Art collection ==
Shah is one of the most influential collectors in the state of California, and she serves on the board of trustees for the San Francisco Museum of Modern Art. She previously served on the board of trustees for the Asian Art Museum in San Francisco.

Her and her husband's art collection is made of some 300 pieces, devoted to modern and contemporary works by women artists. It has taken over a decade to assemble. Artists in the collection include Elizabeth Murray, Trude Guermonprez, Rina Banerjee, Jennifer Bartlett, Laura Owens, Carol Bove, Carrie Moyer, Phyllida Barlow, Jaune Quick-to-See Smith, and Cecily Brown.

Highlights from the collection have been exhibited at several locations from 2023 through 2027. The exhibition was entitled Making Their Mark: Works from the Shah Garg Collection.

== Personal life ==
She is married to Gaurav Garg, a co-founder and managing partner of Silicon Valley–based Wing Venture Capital.
