= Kamala Sankaran =

Indian legal academic

Kamala Sankaran is a legal academic, and currently a professor of law at National Law School of India University, Bengaluru. She has also been the vice-chancellor of Tamil Nadu National Law University. She has served as a member of the Working Group on Migration, set up by the Ministry of Housing and Urban Poverty Alleviation, Government of India; and on the Delhi High Court Legal Service Committee and the Delhi State Legal Services Authority.

== Education ==
Sankaran obtained an undergraduate degree in law (LLB) and master's of law (LLM) from the Faculty of Law, University of Delhi in 1982 and 1985, respectively. She obtained a PhD from the Faculty of Law, University of Delhi in 1999.

== Academic career ==
Sankaran has taught at the Faculty of Law, Jamia Milia Islamia, Indian Law Institute and Campus Law Centre, Faculty of Law, University of Delhi.

She currently teaches at the National Law School of Indian University, Bengaluru where she is a Professor of Law, Ford Foundation Chair in Public Interest Law. Additionally, she is the Dean of the university's research.

== Selected publications ==
- Sankaran, Kamala; Dupper, Ockert eds. (2014). Affirmative Action: A View from the Global South. Stellenbosch: Sun Press. ISBN 978-1-920689-46-9.
- Sankaran, Kamala; Fudge, Judy; McCrystal, Shae eds. (2012). Challenging the Legal Boundaries of Work Regulation. Oxford: Hart Publishing. ISBN 9781849462792.
- Sankaran, Kamala. (2009). Freedom of Association in India and International Labour Standards. Nagpur: LexisNexis. ISBN 9788180385131.
