= Kamala Krishnaswamy =

Indian scientist in nutrition

- Education: Osmania University, Karolinska institute
- Scientific career
- Workplaces: National institute of Nutrition

Kamala Krishnaswamy is an Indian scientist in nutrition. She is a former director of the National institute of Nutrition from 1997 to 2002, and was the President of the Nutrition Society of India from 2003 to 2008.

== Early life ==
Born on 4 April 1940 in Hyderabad in India, She earned her MBBS and MD in Internal Medicine from Osmania University. She trained in clinical pharmacology in the Karolinska institute in Sweden under a World Health Organization fellowship. She joined the National institute of Nutrition in 1964 and became its director in 1997.

Krishnaswamy is a former Emeritus Medical Scientist at the Indian Council of Medical Research, she was inducted as a fellow in the National Academy of Agricultural Sciences in 2003, and is also a fellow of the Indian National Science Academy, the Indian Academy of Sciences, the National Academy of Medical Sciences, and the International Union of Nutritional Sciences as well as other societies.

== Honors and awards ==
The recipient of multiple awards, including Dr. VN Patwardhan Prize and the Dr. Kamala Menon Medical Research Award from the Indian Council of Medical Research; the Ramachandran Oration Award from the Nutrition Foundation of India in 2011, Dr. Gopalan Cenetenary Award of Nutrition Society of India in 2018 and many others, Krishnaswamy was most recently honored with the Living Legend Award of International Union of Nutritional Sciences Award in 2022.

== Books ==
- Obesity in the urban middle class in Delhi.
- Drug Metabolism and Pharmacokinetics in Malnutrition.
