= Kamela =

Kamela may refer to:

- Kamela, Poland, village
- Kamela, Oregon, unincorporated community, United States

== People with the surname Kamela ==
- Danielle Kamela or Vanessa Borne (born 1988), American professional wrestler and actress
- Paul Kamela (born 1962), Cameroonian boxer

== See also ==
- Kamala (disambiguation)
