= Wing Venture Capital =

Venture capital firm

- Type: Private
- Industry: Venture capital
- Founded: 2013
- Founder: Peter Wagner; Gaurav Garg
- Headquarters: Palo Alto, California

Wing Venture Capital is a venture capital firm based in Palo Alto, California. It was founded by Peter Wagner and Gaurav Garg; Sara Choi is a partner.

== History ==
Wing Venture Capital was founded in 2013 by Wagner and Garg. Wagner had been a former partner at Accel, while Garg had been at Sequoia Capital. By 2016, the firm was already on Wing Two, its second fund, with $250 million allocated for startup companies working on business technology.

By the 2020s, the firm was specifically interested in investing in an "AI-first technology stack." In 2023, it closed a $600 million fund to invest in startup companies "that develop AI tools with a business use case."

== Enterprise Tech 30 ==
Every year, the firm announces the Enterprise Tech 30, a list of top startup companies working on business technology.

== Portfolio companies ==
- Snowflake
- Gong
- Cohesity
- Lumana
- Develop Health
- Theom
- Inventive
- Orby AI
- Kay.ai
- Torii
- Billables AI
- Tailscale
- Gradient
- Tome
- Spectrum Labs
