= Asif Ali (comedian) =

American actor

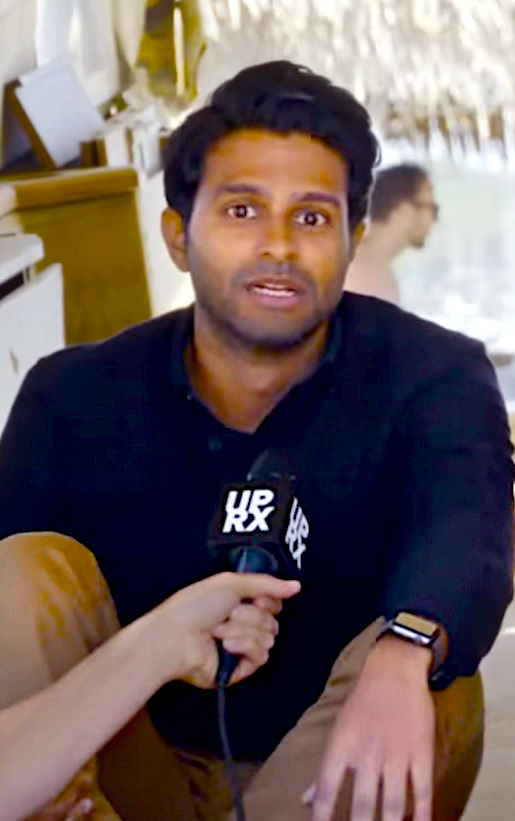
- Ali in 2017
- Born: c. 1988 (age 37–38); Phoenix, Arizona, U.S.
- Occupations: Actor; comedian
- Years active: 2011–present

Asif Ali (born c. 1988) is an American comedian and actor. He has appeared in productions including Wrecked, WandaVision, Don't Worry Darling, and Deli Boys. Ali was named one of Variety's 10 Comics to Watch in 2024.

== Career ==
Ali started his career performing improv comedy in Chicago. He relocated to Los Angeles and became a founding member of the L.A.-based sketch comedy group Goatface with Fahim Anwar, Aristotle Athari and Hasan Minhaj, which formed in 2011.

When he started out acting, he appeared in guest appearances in television shows such as Up All Night, NCIS and Modern Family. In January 2015, Ali was cast as a series regular in the TBS sitcom Wrecked.

In October 2020, it was announced Ali would be starring in the Olivia Wilde psychological thriller Don't Worry Darling, and would appear in roles in Disney+'s The Mandalorian and WandaVision. He would reprise his WandaVision role in Agatha All Along.

Ali starred in the 2022 comedy film Easter Sunday, directed by Jay Chandrasekhar. In January 2023, Ali was cast in the video game Hogwarts Legacy, portraying the Ravenclaw student Amit Thakkar. In March, he joined the cast of the Netflix series Agent Elvis.

He starred in the Hulu series Deli Boys alongside Alfie Fuller and Saagar Shaikh.

== Personal life ==
Ali was born and raised in Phoenix, Arizona, the son of Indian immigrants from Hyderabad. He has a brother.

== Accolades ==
- 2024 – Variety, 10 Comics to Watch

== Filmography ==
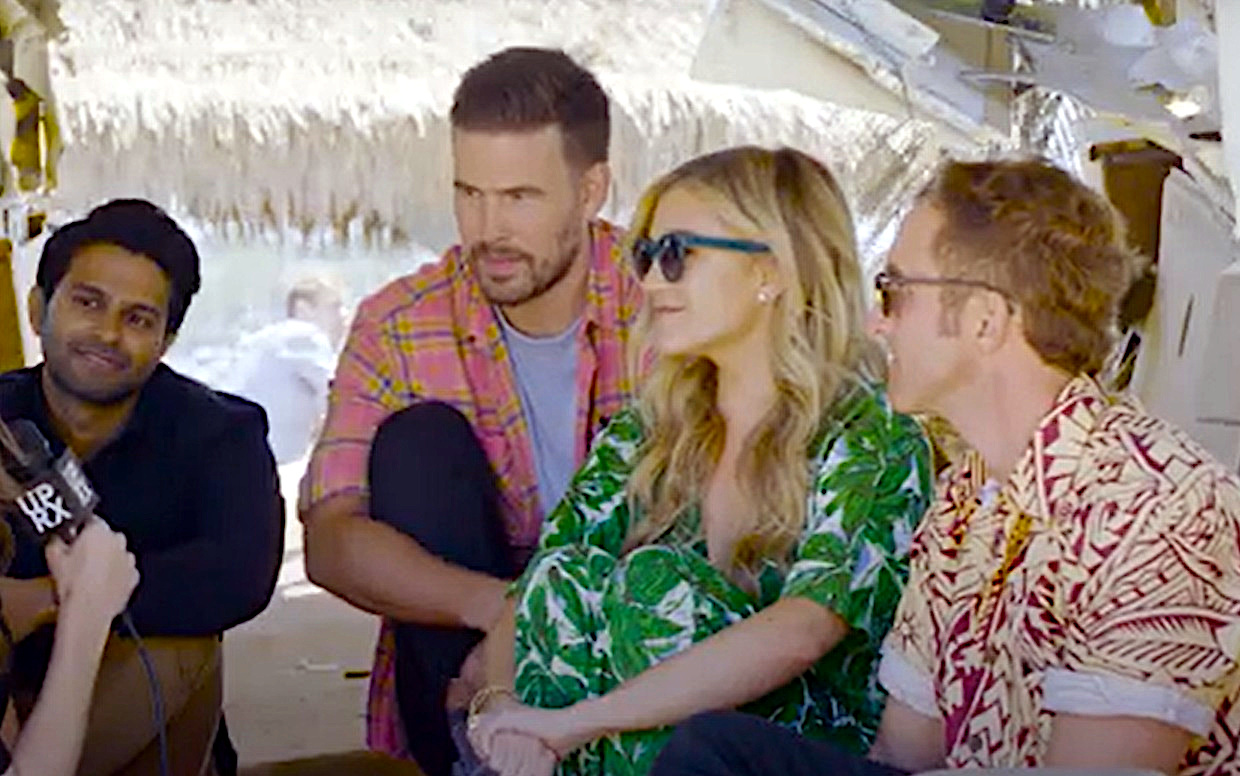
Cast of Wrecked in 2017

=== Film ===
Year	Title	Role	Notes
2012	Noobz	Gas Station Clerk	
2016	Operator	Embarrassed Guy's Voice	Voice role
2016	Dean	Noah	
2016	Chee and T	Mayunk	
2021	7 Days	Asif	
2022	Bromates	Angry Mike	
2022	Easter Sunday	Dev Deluxe	
2022	Don't Worry Darling	Peter	

=== Television ===
Year	Title	Role	Notes
2011	Up All Night	Michael	1 episode
2012	NCIS	Phil	1 episode
2012	Modern Family	Technician	1 episode
2013	Arrested Development	Trout	1 episode
2013	The Goodwin Games	Pizza Delivery Guy	1 episode
2014	Agents of S.H.I.E.L.D.	Jesse Fletcher	1 episode
2014	Silicon Valley	Kwerpy CEO	1 episode
2014	The Comeback	Party Guy	1 episode
2015	Mr. Robinson	Samir Panj	Recurring role, 5 episodes
2016	American Housewife	Vali	1 episode
2016–2018	Wrecked	Pack Hara	Main role, 30 episodes
2017	New Girl	Jeremy	2 episodes
2017	The Mick	Security Guard	2 episodes
2019	American Princess	Sanjeep Farooqui-McMahon	1 episode
2019	The Mandalorian	Caben	Episode: "Chapter 4: Sanctuary"
2019	Mad About You	Rishi	3 episodes
2020	BoJack Horseman	Various roles	2 episodes
2020	Indebted	Ravi	2 episodes
2020	The Big Show Show	Bennett	3 episodes
2020	Brews Brothers	Kale	1 episode
2020	Space Force	Capt. Dave Powers	1 episode
2020–2023	Star Trek: Lower Decks	Ensign Asif / Grafflax	Voice role, 3 episodes
2021	WandaVision	Abilash Tandon / Norm	Miniseries, 5 episodes
2021	Devil May Care	Beans	Voice role, 7 episodes
2021	The Good Doctor	Cal Lewis	1 episode
2023	Agent Elvis	Doyle	Voice role, 6 episodes
2023	Shrinking	Alan	3 episodes
2024	Grimsburg	Lt. Ravi	Voice role, 1 episode
2024	Agatha All Along	Norm	Miniseries, 2 episodes
2024	American Dad!	Lifeguard	Voice role, 1 episode
2025–2026	Deli Boys	Mir Dar	Main role, 16 episodes; Also executive producer
2025	Ghosts	Sunil	1 episode
2025	Krapopolis	Entochus	Voice role, 1 episode
2026	Eternally Yours	Igor	1 episode

=== Video games ===
Year	Title	Role	Notes
2023	Hogwarts Legacy	Amit Thakkar	Voice role only
