= Abdullah Saeed =

American producer, journalist, and writer

- Born: May 18, 1984 (age 42); Hanover, New Hampshire, U.S.
- Education: Temple University
- Occupations: Journalist; producer; writer; host; actor
- Spouse: Alexandra Ruddy

Abdullah Saeed (born May 18, 1984) is an American writer, producer, composer, and journalist. He produced and hosted several TV shows and documentaries for Vice.

== Early life and education ==
Saeed was born in New Hampshire to a Pakistani family. He grew up in Thailand, where his father worked at a college campus, and his mother is a nurse.

== Career ==
Saeed began his career as a music journalist and DJ specializing in hip hop and electronic music. He has interviewed DJ Shadow, El-P, and Flying Lotus, among others.

He wrote a weekly online column called Weediquette from 2012 to 2014 and produced and hosted the first episode of the web series of the same name. His works include the James Beard Award-nominated series Bong Appétit, for which he also composed the theme song, and the limited series Vice Does America on Viceland, as well as the Webby Award-winning documentary Mad Honey.

Saeed stopped making content for Vice Media in protest in 2017 in the wake of allegations that Vice tolerated an abusive workplace culture and sexual harassment, and their practice of making employees sign “non-traditional workplace agreements” to protect themselves from being sued by employees for issues arising from said workplace culture.

In 2019, Saeed was recognized by the Associated Press Television and Radio Association for his investigative reporting for KCRW on "seshes" or underground cannabis markets in Los Angeles. Saeed is a former member of The Kominas and Sunny Ali & the Kid, and a current member of the band GOD$. He was a writer and actor on the HBO series High Maintenance and co-wrote a film with Ben Sinclair for Fox Searchlight and New Regency. In 2022, Onyx Collective ordered Saeed's pilot Deli Boys, starring Asif Ali, Saagar Shaikh, Alfie Fuller, and Poorna Jagannathan. It was picked up to series in May 2023.

== Views ==
Saeed is an advocate for cannabis liberalization and education. He describes his family as "pretty liberal and open minded”.

== Personal life ==
He is married to Alexandra Ruddy. He speaks both English and Urdu.

== Filmography ==
=== Film ===
Year	Title	Role	Notes	Ref
2024	South Park: The End of Obesity	Pakistani #2 (voice)	Television film	

=== Television ===
Year	Title	Role	Notes
2025	Deli Boys	Director/Creator	
