= The Marvels =

2023 Marvel Studios film

- Theatrical release poster
- Directed by: Nia DaCosta
- Written by: Nia DaCosta; Megan McDonnell; Elissa Karasik
- Based on: Marvel Comics
- Produced by: Kevin Feige
- Starring: Brie Larson; Teyonah Parris; Iman Vellani; Zawe Ashton; Gary Lewis; Park Seo-joon; Zenobia Shroff; Mohan Kapur; Saagar Shaikh; Samuel L. Jackson
- Cinematography: Sean Bobbitt
- Edited by: Catrin Hedström; Evan Schiff
- Music by: Laura Karpman
- Production company: Marvel Studios
- Distributed by: Walt Disney Studios Motion Pictures
- Release dates: November 7, 2023 (Las Vegas); November 10, 2023 (United States)
- Running time: 105 minutes
- Country: United States
- Language: English
- Budget: $374 million (gross); $307.3 million (net)
- Box office: $206.1 million

The Marvels is a 2023 American superhero film based on Marvel Comics. Produced by Marvel Studios and distributed by Walt Disney Studios Motion Pictures, it is the sequel to the film Captain Marvel (2019), a continuation of the television miniseries Ms. Marvel (2022), and the 33rd film in the Marvel Cinematic Universe (MCU). The film was directed by Nia DaCosta, who co-wrote the screenplay with Megan McDonnell and Elissa Karasik. It stars Brie Larson as Carol Danvers / Captain Marvel, Teyonah Parris as Monica Rambeau, and Iman Vellani as Kamala Khan / Ms. Marvel, alongside Zawe Ashton, Gary Lewis, Park Seo-joon, Zenobia Shroff, Mohan Kapur, Saagar Shaikh, and Samuel L. Jackson. In the film, Danvers, Rambeau, and Kamala team up as "the Marvels" after they begin swapping places with each other every time they use their powers.

Marvel Studios confirmed plans to make a sequel to Captain Marvel in July 2019. Development began in January 2020 with McDonnell hired after working on the television miniseries WandaVision (2021). Larson was set to return from the first film as Danvers, and DaCosta was hired to direct that August. In December, Parris was revealed to be reprising her role as Rambeau from WandaVision alongside Vellani returning as Kamala from Ms. Marvel. Second unit filming began in mid-April 2021 in New Jersey, and the title—referring to the three characters and their similar abilities—was revealed in early May. Principal photography began in July 2021 and concluded by mid-May 2022, taking place at Pinewood Studios in Buckinghamshire and Longcross Studios in Surrey, England, as well as in Los Angeles and Tropea, Italy. Karasik's involvement was revealed during post-production.

The Marvels premiered in Las Vegas on November 7, 2023, and was released in the United States on November 10 as part of Phase Five of the MCU. It received mixed reviews from critics, with praise for its performances and action sequences but criticism for its script and tonal inconsistencies. The film was a box-office bomb, grossing $206.1 million worldwide against a gross production budget of $374 million, making it the lowest-grossing film in the MCU and one of the few MCU films not to break even in its theatrical run.

== Plot ==
Carol Danvers destroys the Supreme Intelligence, the artificial intelligence that leads the Kree empire. (Note: This is soon after the events of Captain Marvel (2019)) This leads to a civil war on planet Hala, the Kree home world, rendering the planet barren as it loses its air, water, and sunlight over the next 30 years. The Kree come to know Danvers as "the Annihilator".

The Kree's new leader Dar-Benn discovers one of the two legendary Quantum Bands, which were previously used to create a network that allows fast travel across space. She uses the Band to forcibly open a new jump point that connects to the network. The resulting anomaly impacts the entire network, including a jump point near Earth's S.A.B.E.R. space station run by Nick Fury. Captain Monica Rambeau investigates the jump point near S.A.B.E.R. while Danvers investigates the new one that Dar-Benn opened. When they touch their respective jump points, Rambeau is transported to Danvers's location, Kamala Khan—who has the other Quantum Band on Earth—is transported to Rambeau's location, and Danvers is transported to Kamala's house. The three use their different light-based powers to fight off Kree enemies, leaving Kamala's home destroyed.

After the trio return to their original places, Fury and Rambeau visit Kamala on Earth. Rambeau surmises that their light-based powers are linked through quantum entanglement and that they switch places when any of the three use their powers simultaneously. They join up at a Skrull refugee colony on planet Tarnax, which Danvers helped found and where a peace treaty is being negotiated with the Kree. When talks break down, Dar-Benn rips open another jump point which siphons the atmosphere from Tarnax to restore breathable air to Hala. After a hasty effort to evacuate the colony, Danvers, Rambeau, and Kamala form a team that Kamala names "the Marvels". Danvers explains that Dar-Benn's repeated rupturing of jump points is causing instability in the network and endangering the entire universe. They deduce that Dar-Benn is targeting planets that are meaningful to Danvers, whom Dar-Benn blames for the desolation of Hala.

The Marvels travel to the water planet Aladna—where people communicate in song—and warn Prince Yan, Danvers's husband through a diplomatic act. Dar-Benn arrives and tears open a jump point, drawing the planet's water to Hala. Her final plan is to use the energy from Earth's sun to restore that of Hala's sun. On S.A.B.E.R., Goose—Danvers's cat-like pet Flerken—gives birth to a litter of kittens that can temporarily consume people, which Fury uses to evacuate the station's personnel. Dar-Benn steals Kamala's Band and attempts to use both Bands, but this destroys Dar-Benn, ends the Marvels' entanglement, and leaves behind a rupture between realities. Kamala reclaims the Bands and joins Danvers to energize Rambeau, allowing her to close the rupture but stranding her on the other side. Kamala returns to Earth and Danvers uses her power to restore Hala's sun.

Kamala's family helps Danvers move into Rambeau's house. Kamala's short-lived team-up with Danvers and Rambeau inspires her to seek out other young heroes and form a new group, starting with Kate Bishop. In a mid-credits scene, Rambeau awakes in a parallel universe where she is greeted by Binary—an alternate version of her mother Maria—and the mutant scientist Hank McCoy.

== Cast ==
- Brie Larson as Carol Danvers / Captain Marvel:
  An Avenger and former United States Air Force fighter pilot whose DNA was altered during an accident, imbuing her with superhuman strength, energy projection and absorption, and flight. Larson said the film would dive deeper into the complexities of Danvers's character after her origin story was established in Captain Marvel (2019). Since the events of Avengers: Endgame (2019), Danvers has mostly been off Earth in deep space. Larson said the character had become a "workaholic" and lost touch with her family and friends.
- Teyonah Parris as Monica Rambeau:
  An astronaut for S.A.B.E.R. who has the ability to manipulate all wavelengths of the electromagnetic spectrum. She is the daughter of Danvers's late friend and fellow airwoman Maria Rambeau, and looked up to Danvers as a child. Parris said The Marvels would further explore Rambeau beyond what was established in the Disney+ miniseries WandaVision (2021). She boxed to prepare for the role.
- Iman Vellani as Kamala Khan / Ms. Marvel:
  A teenage mutant from Jersey City who idolizes Danvers and wears a Quantum Band, a magical bangle that unlocked her ability to harness cosmic energy and create hard light constructs. Kamala is in awe of Danvers and Rambeau, her heroes, which producer Kevin Feige likened to Peter Parker's role in Captain America: Civil War (2016). Vellani practiced parkour to prepare for Kamala's movement style in the film.
- Zawe Ashton as Dar-Benn:
  The Kree leader who is trying to restore her homeland after a civil war. She wields the Universal Weapon, a large hammer that was previously used by the Kree fanatic Ronan the Accuser in Guardians of the Galaxy (2014). Director Nia DaCosta encouraged Ashton to prioritize her agility and strength in her training. Ashton's fiancé Tom Hiddleston, who portrays Loki in the MCU, gave her advice on playing a Marvel villain.
- Gary Lewis as Emperor Dro'ge: The leader of the Skrull colony on the planet Tarnax
- Park Seo-joon as Prince Yan: The charismatic prince of the planet Aladna who is Danvers's husband and ally
- Zenobia Shroff as Muneeba Khan: Kamala's mother
- Mohan Kapur as Yusuf Khan: Kamala's father
- Saagar Shaikh as Aamir Khan: Kamala's older brother
- Samuel L. Jackson as Nick Fury:
  The former director of S.H.I.E.L.D. who is working on the space station S.A.B.E.R. The film's version of Fury is much lighter and more fun than the version seen in the Disney+ miniseries Secret Invasion (2023), which executive producer Mary Livanos attributed to the relationship between Fury and Danvers that was established in Captain Marvel.

Tessa Thompson reprises her role from previous MCU films as Valkyrie, and Hailee Steinfeld reprises her role as Kate Bishop from the Disney+ miniseries Hawkeye (2021). Lashana Lynch reprises her role as Monica's mother, Maria Rambeau, from Captain Marvel. She also portrays an alternate version of Maria called Binary, appearing in the mid-credits scene alongside Kelsey Grammer as Dr. Hank McCoy / Beast. Grammer reprises his role from 20th Century Fox's X-Men films X-Men: The Last Stand (2006) and X-Men: Days of Future Past (2014). Leila Farzad and Abraham Popoola portray S.A.B.E.R. workers Talia and Dag, respectively, and Daniel Ings portrays Kree scientist Ty-Rone. Goose, Carol's pet Flerken who resembles a cat, is played by cats Nemo and Tango, replacing actors Reggie, Archie, Rizzo, and Gonzo from the first film.

== Production ==
=== Development ===
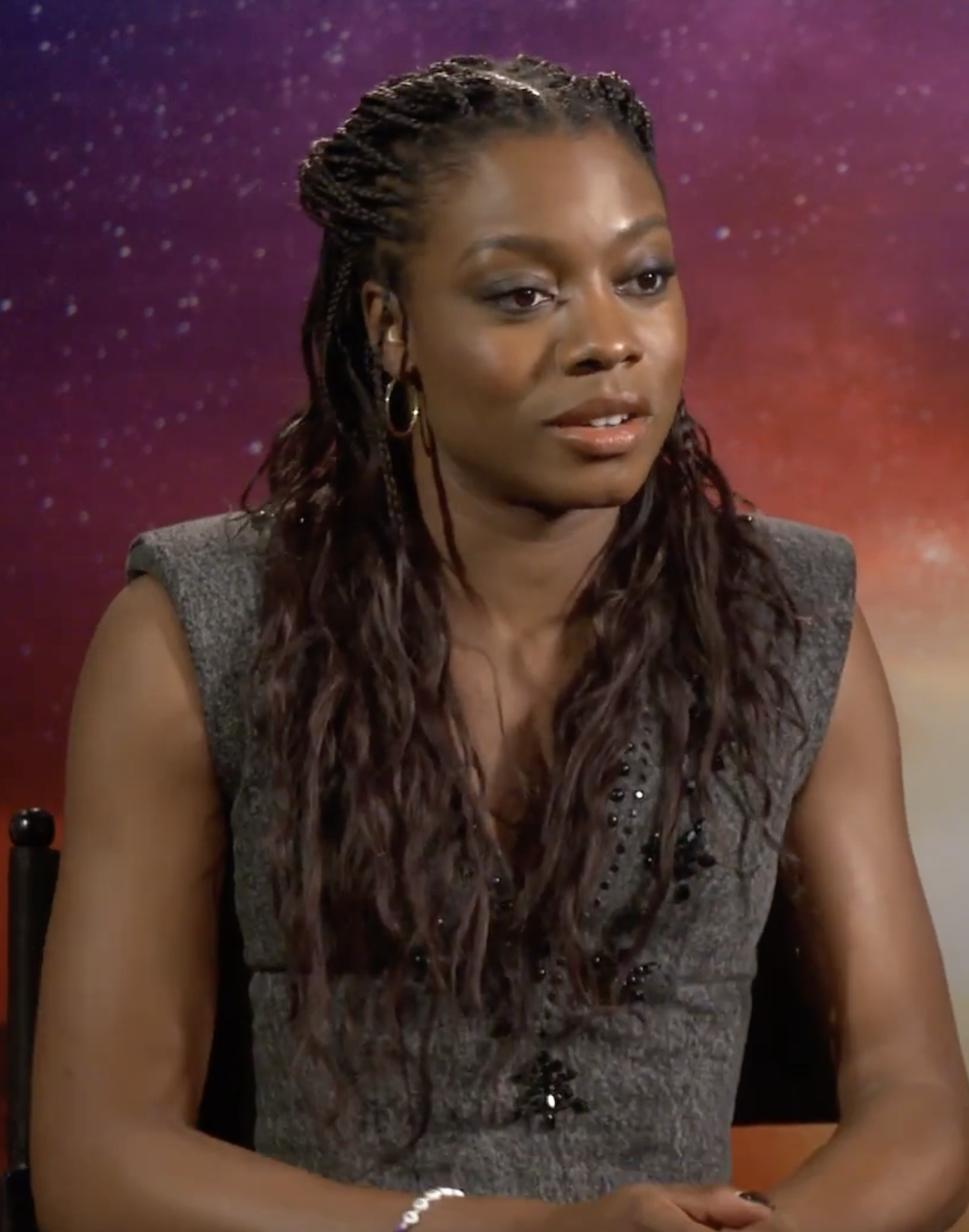
Director Nia DaCosta promoting the film in November 2023

Ahead of the release of Captain Marvel (2019), star Brie Larson expressed interest in a sequel featuring the character Kamala Khan / Ms. Marvel. Producer Kevin Feige previously said there were plans to introduce Kamala to the Marvel Cinematic Universe (MCU) following the release of Captain Marvel, because Kamala is inspired by Carol Danvers / Captain Marvel; Iman Vellani was later cast as Kamala for the Disney+ television miniseries Ms. Marvel (2022). In March 2019, Feige said Marvel Studios had some "pretty amazing" ideas for a sequel, which could either be set in the 1990s, like the first film, or the present day. Lashana Lynch expressed interest in reprising her role of Maria Rambeau in a sequel, even if it was set in the present.

At the 2019 San Diego Comic-Con in July, Feige confirmed plans for a Captain Marvel sequel. Official development began in January 2020, when Megan McDonnell entered negotiations to write the script after serving as a staff writer on Marvel Studios' Disney+ miniseries WandaVision (2021). Larson was confirmed to return as Danvers, but Anna Boden and Ryan Fleck were not expected to return after directing and co-writing the first film. The studio hoped to hire a female director to replace them. The film was expected to be set in the present day, and was aiming for a 2022 release. In April 2020, Disney scheduled the film for release on July 8, 2022, filling the July 2022 date that the studio had previously reserved for an untitled Marvel film.

Nia DaCosta was hired to direct the film in August 2020. Deadline Hollywood's Justin Kroll said this was another sign of Marvel Studios adding diversity to its films due to DaCosta being the first Black woman hired as a director by the studio. Kroll added that the film would likely break the record for the biggest-budgeted film directed by a Black woman. The studio had also considered Olivia Wilde and Jamie Babbit as directors for the film, but DaCosta was said to have been the frontrunner for some time. Richard Newby of The Hollywood Reporter said DaCosta's hiring could bring new energy to the MCU and Captain Marvel franchise, saying she "enjoys challenging preconceived notions about the relationship between characters and the lore behind stories". Newby also felt the film could explore Danvers's story from the perspective of Maria Rambeau's daughter Monica, a Black woman in present-day America.

DaCosta, a self-professed comic book nerd, developed the film with WandaVision producer Mary Livanos who gave her "creative latitude" to make the film she wanted. Larson said DaCosta was the best person to direct the film and praised her pitch presentation. DaCosta's original pitch included Adam Warlock and time travel, but she was told that Warlock would be appearing in Guardians of the Galaxy Vol. 3 (2023) and the Disney+ series Loki (2021–2023) already dealt with time travel stories. DaCosta also cited Final Fantasy VII: Advent Children (2005) in her pitch as a reference for the film, particularly for its fight scenes and ending sequence.

Feige announced Captain Marvel 2 in December 2020, with a new release date of November 11, 2022. He confirmed DaCosta's involvement, revealed that Teyonah Parris would reprise her role as Monica Rambeau from WandaVision, and said Vellani would reprise her role as Kamala. Parris was excited to work with DaCosta again after Candyman (2021), and to further explore Monica's relationship with Danvers as teased in WandaVision. Larson felt it made sense narratively to have Kamala and Rambeau introduced to the MCU in other projects before the three characters meet in this film, something she had discussed with Feige "from the beginning".

=== Pre-production ===
Pre-production work began by February 2021, when Zawe Ashton was cast as the film's villain. By that time, all of the scripts for Ms. Marvel had been written so The Marvels creative team was able to read those to know what happens to Kamala in that series. Principal photography was expected to begin at the end of May, though some second unit filming began on April 9 in Jersey City, New Jersey, under the working title Goat Rodeo, to capture aerial footage, establishing shots, and green screen plates. In May, Marvel Studios revealed that the sequel would be titled The Marvels. Ethan Anderton of /Film noted that the title referred to both Captain Marvel and Ms. Marvel, since the film's logo included the same stylized "S" from the Ms. Marvel series' logo. Graeme McMillian at The Hollywood Reporter acknowledged this explanation, but also wondered if there was a connection with the 1994 comics series Marvels—which tells various Marvel Universe events from the perspective of a photographer—or with a project of the same name announced in 2020. He also wondered if "The Marvels" referred to a family of heroes, much like DC Comics' Marvel Family (now known as the Shazam Family). Later that month, pre-production work began in the United Kingdom.

Park Seo-joon was cast in an undisclosed role in mid-June, and was set to join the production after completing work on the film Concrete Utopia (2023). His role was reported as Prince Yan of the planet Aladna. Larson and Parris began preparing for filming the next month. DaCosta said The Marvels would deal with "specific, personal, [and] sometimes sad things", such as how people deal with pain and trauma, but would have a lighter story than her films Little Woods (2018) and Candyman. She felt that she had more creative freedom on The Marvels than on her prior films. Feige said the dynamic between Danvers, Kamala, and Rambeau was the center of the film and likened their team-up to the formation of the Avengers in The Avengers (2012). He revealed that The Marvels would have "fun cosmic elements", including some from Roy Thomas's 1971 "Kree–Skrull War" comic book storyline, with the story directly picking up from the ending of Captain Marvel. He described the film as tonally different from the MCU miniseries Secret Invasion (2023), another Captain Marvel follow-up; the series was believed to tie in with the film, but The Marvels largely ignores the events of Secret Invasion. Matt Webb Mitovich at TVLine speculated that Marvel intended for The Marvels to be set before Secret Invasion, given that film had numerous previous release dates prior to Secret Invasion's June 2023 premiere, but that assumption "still leaves continuity issues all over the place".

=== Filming ===
Principal photography was expected to begin on May 31, 2021, but began on July 26, 2021, at Pinewood Studios in Buckinghamshire, and at Longcross Studios in Longcross, Surrey, England. Sean Bobbitt was the cinematographer. Larson confirmed that she had started filming on August 10, and shortly after, Samuel L. Jackson revealed that he would reprise his MCU role as Nick Fury, working on it in London at the same time as he was preparing to film Secret Invasion. Filming for The Marvels took place in Tropea, Italy, beginning on August 27, including on the coast of the Tyrrhenian Sea. On September 3, Park left for Los Angeles to begin filming. Shortly after, Saagar Shaikh, Zenobia Shroff and Mohan Kapur were revealed to be reprising their respective roles as Kamala's older brother Aamir, mother Muneeba, and father Yusuf, from Ms. Marvel. In October 2021, the film's release was delayed to February 17, 2023. Park shot his scenes for two months, and completed filming in England by November 2. Production designer Cara Brower said the film's scale and scope were massive, contrasting her work with DaCosta on Candyman. The production created 54 sets at Pinewood and Longcross Studios for five different planets (including Aladna) and spaceships, the S.A.B.E.R. space station, Maria Rambeau's house, and the Khan family's house. DaCosta wanted each planet to have a distinct design. In April 2022, the film's release was moved to July 28, 2023, swapping places with Ant-Man and the Wasp: Quantumania, as that film was further along in production. Filming of The Marvels wrapped by the middle of the following month.

=== Post-production ===
Jackson revealed in mid-June 2022 that he would return to London in August to work on reshoots for The Marvels, before doing the same for Secret Invasion, and Marvel was preparing for those reshoots by the end of July. That month, Larson made a cameo appearance in the last episode of Ms. Marvel, "No Normal", through footage that DaCosta had filmed for The Marvels. DaCosta did not know the footage would be used this way when she filmed it, and its inclusion in Ms. Marvel was a surprise to directors Adil El Arbi and Bilall Fallah as well. Filming for The Marvels occurred in early August in Battery Park in New York City to capture visual effects plates. DaCosta was revealed in January 2023 to have also worked on the film's script alongside Elissa Karasik and Zeb Wells, who had respectively served as a writer on Loki and the MCU miniseries She-Hulk: Attorney at Law (2022), though only DaCosta, McDonnell, and Karasik were credited. In February 2023, the film's release was delayed to November 10, 2023, as Disney and Marvel Studios were re-evaluating their content output and costs. This allowed more time for post-production. Joanna Robinson of The Ringer reported in April that the film was undergoing a "massive overhaul" and reshoots, which took place for four weeks to reportedly make the storyline coherent. Feige reportedly became more involved with the film than he had been previously following the poor box office reception to Quantumania.

The first trailer, released in April 2023, revealed that Ashton was playing Dar-Benn and Daniel Ings had been cast as Ty-Rone. Lynch was then reported to be reprising her role as Maria Rambeau, alongside Cobie Smulders and Randall Park in their respective MCU roles as Maria Hill and Jimmy Woo, although Smulders denied her involvement in June. Also in June, Gary Lewis was revealed to have joined the cast, portraying Emperor Dro'ge, and Marvel Studios held a public test screening of the film in Texas. This was an "uncharacteristic" move by the studio and the screening was reportedly met with mixed responses. Tessa Thompson was revealed to be reprising her MCU role of Valkyrie in the film when the final trailer was released in early November. Marvel wanted to show a friendship between Danvers and Valkyrie after fans had "shipped" the two characters, and they thought it made sense for Thompson to cameo in the film due to her close relationship with DaCosta after starring in Little Woods. When the film was released soon after, Hailee Steinfeld and Kelsey Grammer were revealed to be in the film, reprising their respective roles of Kate Bishop from the Disney+ miniseries Hawkeye (2021) and Dr. Hank McCoy / Beast from 20th Century Fox's X-Men films X-Men: The Last Stand (2006) and X-Men: Days of Future Past (2014). Kate Bishop was chosen for the film's end scene, where she is recruited by Kamala to join a new team of young heroes, because the characters live close together in the New York tri-state area. Livanos was excited to start bringing together the MCU's younger heroes, many of whom had been introduced in various recent MCU projects, and said the scene would "lead to some pretty exciting things". For Grammer's cameo in the mid-credits scene, Feige personally called him about returning, leveraging their relationship from when Feige worked on the X-Men film series. Grammer was excited to return to his role, which he described as "a real character of gravitas and importance in our culture", and hoped it would lead to more MCU appearances. Also appearing in the scene is Lynch as an alternate version of Maria called Binary.

Catrin Hedström and Evan Schiff edited the film. Hedström previously worked with DaCosta on Candyman. Ashton stated in February 2024 that they filmed an alternate ending where Danvers perished with Dar-Benn. Visual effects for the film were created by Industrial Light & Magic, Rise FX, Rising Sun Pictures, Sony Pictures Imageworks, Trixter, Wētā FX, and Wylie Co. Tara DeMarco was the visual effects supervisor.

== Music ==
In January 2022, Laura Karpman was hired to compose the score for the film, after previously doing so for the first season of the MCU television series What If...? (2021) and Ms. Marvel. DaCosta asked Karpman to write a new theme for the titular team rather than focusing on the individual characters, similar to how The Avengers focused on a team theme rather than individual character themes. Karpman described the film's main theme, "Higher. Further. Faster. Together", as a chosen family theme that combines elements for Danvers, Rambeau, and Kamala. The theme ends with a choir chanting "higher, further, faster, together" in Latin. Dar-Benn's "slithery and jazzy" theme is mainly played on flutes and was inspired by the music of Herbie Hancock. John Ottman's X-Men themes from X2 (2003) and X-Men: Days of Future Past are heard during the mid-credits scene.

A suite that Karpman wrote to take the main theme "through paces", titled "The Marvels Suite", was performed at the Philadelphia Orchestra on June 3, 2023. "Higher. Further. Faster. Together." premiered at the Last Night of the BBC Proms on September 9, and was released as a digital single on November 2. A soundtrack album for Karpman's score was released by Hollywood Records and Marvel Music on November 8.

== Marketing ==
Larson, Parris, and Vellani appeared at the 2022 D23 Expo to promote the film and show exclusive footage. A teaser trailer, which featured the song "Intergalactic" by Beastie Boys, premiered on Good Morning America on April 11, 2023. Edidiong Mboho of Collider felt the teaser "delivers on the charm and action the MCU is known for". Charles Pulliam-Moore at The Verge said the trailer showed that Danvers, Rambeau, and Kamala "are going to end up making quite the team" and thought the 'place-switching' fight sequences could be the most inventive of the MCU. Jackson's appearance in the teaser was considered by some commentators to be a spoiler for the end of Secret Invasion, as it indicated that Fury survives the events of the series despite speculation that the character could die by the end of it. Marvel Studios and Bic partnered to create limited-edition pens inspired by the film, as well as the "Write with Might" sweepstakes that offered a chance to win a trip to the film's premiere. Pita Pit was also partnered with Marvel Studios and Walt Disney Pictures to launch the brand new limited edition smoothie "Banana Chai" to promote the film. In September 2023, DaCosta expressed concern that she would be promoting the film on her own since the cast were not able to participate in marketing during the 2023 SAG-AFTRA strike. The strike ultimately did not end until after the film's premiere, which was held in Las Vegas on November 7 without the cast. Marvel collaborated with software company Autodesk to display a video of Goose, Danvers's cat-like pet Flerken, on the Sphere through November 13. The strike ended on November 9, and Larson was booked to appear on The Tonight Show Starring Jimmy Fallon the next day to promote the film.

== Release ==
=== Theatrical ===
The Marvels premiered in Las Vegas on November 7, 2023. It was released in South Korea on November 8, and in the United States and China on November 10, in IMAX, ScreenX, and 4DX. The film was initially not expected to have an IMAX release because Dune: Part Two was scheduled to be released on November 3 and would have access to all IMAX screens for five to six weeks. IMAX Corporation CEO Richard Gelfond said the company would pivot to showing The Marvels in IMAX should Dune: Part Two be delayed by the SAG-AFTRA strike, and this was confirmed in August when the film was moved to March 2024. Before it was set for the November 2023 release date, The Marvels was scheduled for July 8, 2022, November 11, 2022, February 17, 2023, and July 28, 2023. It is part of Phase Five of the MCU.

=== Home media ===
The film was released by Walt Disney Studios Home Entertainment on digital download on January 16, 2024, on Disney+ on February 7, and on Ultra HD Blu-ray, Blu-ray, and DVD on February 13. It includes deleted scenes and behind-the-scenes featurettes.

In the United Kingdom, The Marvels debuted at number one on the Official Film Chart and held the top position through January 24, 2024. For the chart period ending January 31, the film placed third. It later returned to number one for the chart period ending February 28.

In the United States, following its premium video-on-demand (PVOD) release, The Marvels ranked first on Vudu, third on Apple TV, and third on Google Play. On physical media, The Marvels ranked second on both Circana's VideoScan First Alert chart and the Blu-ray Disc charts for the week ending February 17, 2024. During that week, the film sold approximately 75% as many copies as The Hunger Games: The Ballad of Songbirds & Snakes. High-definition formats accounted for 69% of first-week sales, including 32% from standard Blu-ray and 37% from 4K Ultra HD. For February 2024, The Marvels ranked as the second-best-selling physical media title by units sold, behind The Hunger Games: The Ballad of Songbirds & Snakes. The film entered Circana's monthly top 10 and placed fourth on the year-to-date physical media sales chart through February 2024, behind Trolls Band Together, The Hunger Games: The Ballad of Songbirds & Snakes, and Oppenheimer. In March 2024, The Marvels ranked as the tenth-best-selling physical media title by units sold, moving from its second-place position in February. On the year-to-date physical media sales chart through March 2024, the film placed sixth overall, down two positions from the previous month. For the full year, The Marvels ranked 21st on the Top Selling Titles on Disc (DVD and Blu-ray combined) of 2024, according to Circana VideoScan, recording a sales index of 25.07 relative to the year's top-selling title. Blu-ray formats accounted for 56 percent of total unit sales, including a 23 percent share from 4K Ultra HD.

According to the file-sharing news website TorrentFreak, The Marvels ranked among the top ten most-pirated films for the weeks ending December 11 and 18, 2023. It was reported as the most-pirated film for the week ending January 22, 2024, and remained in the top ten from January 29 through March 4, 2024. Nielsen Media Research, which records streaming viewership on U.S. television screens, calculated that The Marvels was watched for 559 million minutes from February 5–11, 2024, making it the most-streamed film of the week. The following week, from February 12–18, the film accumulated 337 million minutes of watch time, ranking as the fifth most-streamed film.

== Reception ==
=== Box office ===
The Marvels grossed $84.5 million in the United States and Canada, and $121.6 million in other territories, for a worldwide total of $206.1 million. It is the first box-office bomb and the lowest-grossing film of the MCU franchise, falling short of an estimated break-even point of $439.6 million. Puck News reported that the film needed to earn around $700 million to become profitable. Deadline Hollywood calculated the net losses of the film to be $237 million, when factoring together expenses and revenues. Despite this, it surpassed A Wrinkle in Time (2018) to become the highest-grossing film directed by a Black woman.

In the United States and Canada, The Marvels was originally projected to gross around $60 million from 4,030 theaters in its opening weekend. After making $21.3 million on its first day (including $6.6 million from Thursday night previews), estimates were lowered to $47–52 million. It went on to debut to $46.1 million, topping the box office and marking the best opening weekend for a Black female director. However, this also marked the lowest opening weekend for an MCU film, taking that record from The Incredible Hulk (2008). In its second weekend, the film made $10.12 million and finished fourth behind newcomers The Hunger Games: The Ballad of Songbirds & Snakes, Trolls Band Together, and Thanksgiving. This was a 78% drop from the first weekend, which was the biggest second-weekend drop for an MCU film, a record previously held by Quantumania. The Marvels made $6.4 million in its third weekend, finishing in sixth place. On December 3, during its fourth weekend, Disney described the film's box office as "winding down" and said the studio would no longer report its weekend box office grosses, despite the film remaining in theaters through the New Year's holiday. It earned an additional $2.4 million in the fourth weekend, dropping out of the top 10 to 11th place.

Discussing the film's low box office performance, Anthony D'Alessandro of Deadline Hollywood rejected claims that it was impacted by general "superhero fatigue" and instead blamed lackluster marketing and the overexposure of MCU content on Disney+. John Scalzi, writing for Uncanny Magazine, criticized the amount of "homework" required to understand the film considering its connections to multiple Disney+ series and prior MCU films. Disney CEO Bob Iger also acknowledged the large amount of MCU content produced for Disney+, but added that insufficient day-to-day supervision by Disney executives while filming took place during the COVID-19 pandemic was partially to blame for the film's failure. Multiple commentators took issue with this statement, questioning how more executive oversight than Marvel is already known for could be an improvement. Some felt Iger was wrongfully blaming DaCosta for the film's performance, and several characterized his statement as throwing the director "under the bus". This came amid a wider narrative in the Hollywood media, which some attributed to Disney, in which DaCosta appeared to be unfairly targeted. Kaitlyn Booth at Bleeding Cool and Rachel Ulatowski at The Mary Sue both noted that Iger did not suggest Disney's other 2023 box office failures required additional supervision, including Quantumania and Indiana Jones and the Dial of Destiny which were both directed by men, and Ulatowski made it clear that she found Iger's statement to be sexist. In July 2025, Feige attributed the box office to audiences believing they needed to watch the Disney+ series to see the film. He felt the studio should have better explained that this was not necessary.

=== Critical response ===
The review aggregator Rotten Tomatoes reported an approval rating of 63% with an average score of 5.9/10, based on 377 reviews. The website's critical consensus reads, "Funny, refreshingly brief, and elevated by the chemistry of its three leads, The Marvels is easy to enjoy in the moment despite its cluttered story and jumbled tonal shifts." Metacritic, which uses a weighted average, assigned the film a score of 50 out of 100 based on 57 critics, indicating "mixed or average" reviews. Audiences polled by CinemaScore gave the film an average grade of "B" on A+ to F scale, which at the time was tied with Eternals (2021) and Ant-Man and the Wasp: Quantumania for the lowest score of the MCU, while those polled by PostTrak gave it a 73% positive score.

Writing for The Hollywood Reporter, Lovia Gyarkye praised DaCosta's direction as "kinetic", and felt that the directing and the "intimate storytelling style" lets audiences see the main characters from "new and entertaining vantage points". Abby Olcese, for Paste, rated the film an 8.5/10 and praised the film for playing with genre and pulling "aesthetics" from the Ms. Marvel streaming series; Olcese felt that "DaCosta's assured, efficient direction" was an example of what the MCU could have been if the franchise "hadn't gotten bogged down by gloopy effects and overblown lore". In contrast, James Mottram of NME gave the film a 3/5 star rating and felt that the film "never musters the same level of engagement" as DaCosta's Candyman even with "a script that is chock full of good lines and a cast of willing participants". Christy Lemire of RogerEbert.com gave the film a negative review with a 1.5 star rating, calling it "terrible" and opined that it is "the worst film yet in the Marvel Cinematic Universe" with only the musical moments as "an unexpected and much-needed delight".

Despite mixed critical reception, the performances were praised. Peter Bradshaw of The Guardian described the lead trio as "an entertaining intergalactic ensemble". Peter Travers of ABC News similarly commended that "If there is such a thing as chemistry, Larson, Parris and Vellani have it". Amelia Emberwing of IGN declared that Vellani "predictably steals the show". Helen O'Hara of Empire praised the humor and emotional depth of Vellani's Kamala with the "two older heroes". Christian Holub of Entertainment Weekly gave a lukewarm review of the film and opined that it was "a mixed bag that tries to juggle too many different characters and plotlines", but praised Vellani as a "shining star".

=== Accolades ===
Accolades received by The Marvels
Award	Date of ceremony	Category	Recipient	Result	Ref.
Critics' Choice Super Awards	April 4, 2024	Best Actress in a Superhero Movie	Iman Vellani	Won	
Hollywood Music in Media Awards	November 15, 2023	Best Original Score – Sci-Fi/Fantasy Film	Laura Karpman	Won	
Indiana Film Journalists Association Awards	December 18, 2023	Breakout of the Year	Iman Vellani	Nominated	
Las Vegas Film Critics Society Awards	December 13, 2023	Best Youth in Film (Female)	Iman Vellani	Nominated	
Nickelodeon Kids' Choice Awards	July 13, 2024	Favorite Movie	The Marvels	Nominated	
Nickelodeon Kids' Choice Awards	July 13, 2024	Favorite Movie Actress	Brie Larson	Nominated	
People's Choice Awards	February 18, 2024	Action Movie of the Year	The Marvels	Nominated	
People's Choice Awards	February 18, 2024	Action Movie Star of the Year	Brie Larson	Nominated	
Washington D.C. Area Film Critics Association Awards	December 10, 2023	Best Youth Performance	Iman Vellani	Nominated	

== Documentary special ==
In February 2021, the documentary series Marvel Studios: Assembled was announced. The special on this film, "The Making of The Marvels", was released on Disney+ on February 7, 2024.
