= Is God Is =

2018 play by Aleshea Harris

- Original language: English
- Written by: Aleshea Harris
- Genre: Drama, Tragedy

Premiere
- Date: February 6, 2018
- Place: Soho Repertory Theatre

Is God Is is an American play by Aleshea Harris. In 2018 a production directed by Taibi Magar opened Off-Broadway at Soho Rep and ran from February 6 to March 11. The play looks at deviant morality, familial dysfunction, being a black girl/woman, and patricide.

A film adaptation of the play, written and directed by Harris for distribution by Orion Pictures, began filming in 2024, and was released on May 15, 2026.

== Plot ==
Twenty-one-year-old African-American twin sisters Racine and Anaia were burned and scarred as babies. Racine has burn scars on her arms, back, and neck, and Anaia has scars on her arms, face, and neck. After receiving a letter in their apartment in Northeast, they journey to the Dirty South to the deathbed of their mother, who is known as "SHE" or "God" and has scars all over her body. SHE informs them that their father, referred to as “Man”, set the fire that burned the three of them. SHE instructs the sisters to go west to The Valley to find and kill him for revenge. The sisters travel to the Valley to face Man and his new family.

== Reception ==
Is God Is received 3 Obie Awards: Playwriting for Aleshea Harris, Directing for Taibi Magar, and Performance for Alfie Fuller as Anaia and Dame-Jasmine Hughes as Racine.

The play won the American Playwriting Foundation's Relentless Award in 2016. The award, issued to playwrights annually to honor Philip Seymour Hoffman, honored the play, noting its depiction of a revenge story that draws from "the ancient, the modern, the tragic, the Spaghetti Western, hip-hop and Afropunk". The cash prize of $45,000 is the largest cash prize in American theatre given, and about 2,000 un-produced plays were submitted. The award gave Harris the opportunity to have stage readings in regional theaters across the country and abroad.
