= Percy (1989 film) =

- Film poster
- Directed by: Pervez Merwanji
- Written by: Cyrus Mistry; Jill Mistry
- Produced by: Pervez Merwanji
- Starring: Kurush Deboo; Ruby Patel; Hosi Vasunia; Sharad Smart; Ratan Batliwalla; Zenobia Shroff; Rajan Bane; Tushar Joshi; Porus Irani; Kyan Bharucha; Keziah Elavia; Ashdeen Lillawalla; Silloo Mahava; Roshan Tirandaz; Aban Shiekh
- Cinematography: Navroze Contractor
- Edited by: Priya Krishnaswamy
- Music by: Vanraj Bhatia
- Production company: National Film Development Corporation
- Distributed by: National Film Development Corporation
- Release date: 20 January 1989 (India)
- Running time: 128 minutes
- Country: India
- Language: Gujarati

Percy is a 1989 Indian Parsi Gujarati comedy drama film directed by Pervez Merwanji. The film is about a Parsi boy from Bombay (now Mumbai). The film was well received and won the 1989 Best Gujarati Film Award at the National Film Awards. It was Zenobia Shroff's film debut.

== Plot ==
The somewhat awkward bachelor Percy Bhathena is 27 years old and lives together with his mother in a residential area of the Parsi middle class. He works in a small Unani drugstore, where he is harassed by a Marathi colleague. His mother goes from house to house and sells homemade sweets and pickles.

Percy learns of her youth love Vera, that she is going to get married. From that moment on, his thoughts drifts into the past, into his childhood. He reflects on his childhood with his religious mother's quarrels, the reluctant and devastated father, his drowned friend Dara and playing with his childhood friend Vera.

Percy proved the misappropriation of funds by colleague and the colleague was dismissed.

Percy finds out an old gramophone of his father which has the music of Swan Lake and he recalls the incident of sudden death of the father. With the music he imagines to dance with the adult Vera, he even buys a dance councilor for his imaginary dance exercises. The visit of Vera's wedding party with his mother leaves Percy unhappy despite the good food.

Percy's solitude finds a comfort in a music society of his Parsi community, which regularly meets with the common listening of records with Western classical music. Percy is studying Edvard Grieg's piano concerto. On his way home to one of the musical adventures, Percy is hit on the street by the former ex-colleague and his friends. The next day, he has to conclude that the drug trade has been subjected to a fire and that he suddenly has no work and no income. He takes his mother's sales trip, but he does not get rid of anything. Without a goal or as an anesthetic, he strays his time in the streets of Bombay and finally lands in the Music Society. There, in a vision, he experiences his childhood friend Dara as an adult man, who urges him not to waste his lifetime and grab the opportunities at the top.

The next day, Percy is unsuccessful in search for jobs, and his mother breaks up on her sales trip. With the death of his mother, desperate Percy stands alone.

== Cast ==
- Kurush Deboo as Percy Bhathena
- Ruby Patel as Banubai, Percy's Mother
- Hosi Vasunia as Percy's Father
- Zenobia Shroff as Vera
- Sharad Smart as Seth
- Ratan Batliwalla as Dara
- Rajan Bane as Ajit
- Tushar Joshi as Pappu
- Porus Irani as Percy (teenager)
- Kyan Bharucha as Dara (teenager)
- Keziah Elavia as Vera (child)
- Ashdeen Lillawalla as Percy (child)
- Silloo Mahava as Homai
- Roshan Tirandaz as Freny
- Aban Shiekh as Aunt Sera
- Priya Krishnaswamy as a bus rider (cameo appearance)

== Production ==
Percy is based on the short story by Gujarati writer Cyrus Mistry written in 1976. It was produced by National Film Development Corporation. Percy remained the only feature film of documentary and television director Pervez Merwanji, who died two years after its production. Several well-known actors of the Bombay Parsi Theater appeared in the film and he uses the self-irony typical for Parsi plays.

== Reception ==
The film was well received by critics. The Encyclopaedia of Indian Cinema notes, "The film intercuts his actual experiences with his dreams and fantasies... The two realities are separated and merged mainly via Contractor's masterful camerawork."

== Awards ==
The film won 1989 the best feature film in Gujarati award at the 37th National Film Awards "for its searing exploration of the neuroses and the claustrophobic embrace of an ingrown familial culture". At the 1990 Mannheim International Film Festival, Pervez Merwanji received the Prize for the Promotion of Intercultural Dialogue.

The film is preserved at the National Film Archive of India.
