= Deli Boys =

2025 American comedy-drama series

- Official promotional poster
- Genre: Crime comedy Comedy drama
- Created by: Abdullah Saeed
- Starring: Asif Ali; Saagar Shaikh; Poorna Jagannathan; Alfie Fuller; Brian George; Fred Armisen
- Theme music composer: Abdullah Saeed
- Composer: Wendy Wang
- Country of origin: United States
- Original language: English
- No. of seasons: 2
- No. of episodes: 16

Production
- Executive producers: Abdullah Saeed; Michelle Nader; Jenni Konner; Nora Silver; Vali Chandrasekaran; Nisha Ganatra; Mehar Sethi
- Running time: 26 minutes
- Production companies: Cold Fusion Industries; Shaky Gun Productions; Jenni Konner Productions; Onyx Collective; 20th Television

Original release
- Network: Hulu
- Release: March 6, 2025 – May 28, 2026

Deli Boys is an American crime comedy-drama series created by Abdullah Saeed. The series follows two Pakistani-American brothers whose lives are upended after the sudden death of their father reveals his criminal enterprise. Asif Ali, Saagar Shaikh, Poorna Jagannathan, Alfie Fuller, and Brian George star. The 10-episode series premiered on Hulu on March 6, 2025 to positive critical reception. In August 2025, the series was renewed for a second season, which premiered on May 28, 2026.

In August 2026, it was announced that the series was cancelled after two seasons.

== Plot ==
After their multimillionaire father's sudden death, hardworking Mir (Asif Ali) and party boy Raj (Saagar Shaikh) are thrust into Dark DarCo, their father's drug empire that they knew nothing about. With the help of one of Baba's closest consiglieres, Lucky (Poorna Jagannathan), they juggle managing the illegal enterprise and the public-facing company, DarCo, while concealing their activities from their loved ones.

== Cast ==
=== Main ===
- Asif Ali as Mir Dar, who is hardworking and eager to impress his father
- Saagar Shaikh as Raj Dar, a pothead party boy happy to live off his family wealth
- Alfie Fuller as Prairie, Raj's girlfriend, shaman, and an afrofuturist hipster
- Poorna Jagannathan as Naveeda "Lucky", Baba's closest confidante and a leader in the enterprise
- Brian George as Ahmad, a striver seeking the top spot at DarCo
- Fred Armisen as Max Sugar, a casino owner and Lucky's romantic interest (season 2)

=== Recurring ===
- Kevin Corrigan as Chickie Lozano, an Italian American crime boss
- Alexandra Ruddy, as Agent Mercer, an ambitious FBI agent
- Tim Baltz as Director Simpson, regional director of the FBI
- Zainne Saleh as Bushra, Mir's fiancée
- Sakina Jaffrey as Seema, Bushra's mother
- Amita Rao as Nandika, a cosplayer with a crush on Raj
- Anish Jethmalani as Patika, the kindhearted owner of an Indian restaurant
- Minita Gandhi as Latika, Patika's wife
- Iqbal Theba as Arshad "Baba" Dar, the father of Mir and Raj and the head of a criminal enterprise
- Jake Prizant as Matthew, Baba's assistant
- Sofia Black-D'Elia as Gigi, Chickie Lozano's daughter
- Andrew Rannells as Andrew Chadwater, a district attorney (season 2)
- Kumail Nanjiani as Danyal, Max Sugar's attorney (season 2)
- Felonious Munk as Carl, Andrew Chadwater's Chief of Staff (season 2)

=== Guest ===
- Geoffrey Arend as Ralph, who oversees cocaine production
- Ali Sethi as singer and performer to song "Chaap Tilak" (season 2)
- Azhar Usman as Feraz Khan, head of compliance
- Lily Sullivan as Janet, Ralph's wife
- Shahjehan Khan as Ali "Paneer" Sahir, head of distribution
- Tan France as Zubair, a South London gang leader
- Lilly Singh as Aisha (season 2)
- Robin Thede (season 2)
- Ivy Wolk as Seven Sugar (season 2)

== Series overview ==
Season	Episodes	Originally released
1	10	March 6, 2025
2	6	May 28, 2026

== Episodes ==
=== Season 1 (2025) ===
No. overall	No. in season	Title	Directed by	Written by	Original release date
1	1	"Pilot"	Nisha Ganatra	Abdullah Saeed	March 6, 2025
Arshad "Baba" Dar, a Pakistani-American immigrant and head of the successful deli chain ABC Deli, is struck by a stray golf ball on a family golf trip and killed. Following the funeral, his sons Raj and Mir visit the headquarters of DarCo, ABC Deli's parent company, in a bid to have Mir instated as CEO. Their pitch is interrupted by a raid by the FBI, who arrest interim CEO Lucky. Agent Mercer informs the brothers of DarCo's two-decade history of tax fraud among other white-collar crimes. All company accounts are frozen and Mir and Raj's possessions are confiscated. With no other sources of income, they return to the first ABC Deli, Baba's sole business not owned by DarCo and the only deli still operating. Lucky arrives and shoots a staff member, Hamza, in front of the brothers before advising them to leave town. At Raj's insistence, she shows them a video from their father in which he bequeaths the family business to them. Lucky reveals that DarCo is a front for organized crime far beyond what the FBI knows about and blackmails them both into participating. Later, Hamza wakes and flees the store pursued by Raj and Mir. Mercer begins her surveillance.
2	2	"Deadly Boys"	Oz Rodriguez	Abdullah Saeed	March 6, 2025
Lucky orders Raj and Mir to find Hamza and kill him. Mercer confronts the brothers and voices her suspicions about them. Later, she realizes a Tastykake she took from the deli is several years expired, confirming her suspicions that the store is a front. With permission from her boss Simpson, she resolves to crack down on the Dars. Raj and Mir successfully track down Hamza, take him to the apartment above the deli, and tie him up. While they are deliberating about killing him, he escapes his bindings and stabs Raj. In the struggle, Mir smashes a lamp on Hamza's head, finally killing him. Mir's fiancée Bushra visits, so he diverts her away from the store. Mir takes Raj to the hospital and has his injury treated by Dr. Elahi-Khan, Baba's doctor. Meanwhile, Lucky meets with her fellow DarCo associates of the company's illegal side, nicknamed "Dark DarCo". Ahmad, who is vying for the CEO position and sent Hamza to help with his takeover, proposes a vote to elect Baba's successor, but the group is unable to reach a consensus. Guilt-ridden, Raj and Mir begin making plans to start a new life in Florida, but their conversation is interrupted when they are kidnapped.
3	3	"Delhi Boys"	Oz Rodriguez	Mehar Sethi	March 6, 2025
Raj and Mir's kidnappers, revealed to be Lucky and Ahmad, explain the details of smuggling cocaine using containers of Caca Brand Achar, a pungent achar. Lucky nominates the brothers to run DarCo while she and Ahmad act as their advisors. The board agrees to give the brothers a preliminary trial period as co-CEOs. With their regular distribution network shut down, Mir suggests using a Pakora Palace, a local family-owned Indian restaurant chain, to resume the smuggling. Lucky, Ahmad, and Mir visit a Pakora Palace and request they act as distributors. Negotiations soon turn hostile as the owners, Patika and Latika, demand a 50% cut of the profits and Ahmad reveals his prejudice against Indians. Murderwalla, a cleaner, arrives at the deli and forces Raj to assist him in disposing of Hamza's body, all the while berating him for his laziness compared to his father. Seeking to prove his worth, Raj goes to Pakora Palace to assist in negotiations. Together, they secure a deal: Patika and Latika will accept a modest fraction of the profits, and Raj will marry their daughter Nandika after a four-year engagement. As the group celebrates the deal, they realize Hamza's storage locker of cocaine has been emptied. Meanwhile, Mercer begins blackmailing Prairie for information about Raj.
4	4	"Delicate Boys"	Jeremy Konner	Sudi Green	March 6, 2025
5	5	"Jersey Boys"	Maureen Bharoocha	Feraz Ozel	March 6, 2025
6	6	"Lucky Boys"	Andrew Ahn	Abdullah Saeed & Michelle Nader	March 6, 2025
7	7	"Delivery Boys"	Nisha Ganatra	Kyle Lau	March 6, 2025
8	8	"Sweaty Boys"	Fawzia Mirza	Nikki Kashani & Ekaterina Vladimirova	March 6, 2025
9	9	"Shaadi Boys"	Ahmed Ibrahim	Abdullah Saeed	March 6, 2025
10	10	"Confetti Boys"	Jenni Konner	Abdullah Saeed & Mehar Sethi & Michelle Nader	March 6, 2025

=== Season 2 (2026) ===
No. overall	No. in season	Title	Directed by	Written by	Original release date
11	1	"Wealthy Boys"	Nisha Ganatra	Story by : Abdullah Saeed; Teleplay by : Kyle Lau	May 28, 2026
12	2	"Stealthy Boys"	Nisha Ganatra	Mehar Sethi	May 28, 2026
13	3	"Felony Boys"	Nisha Ganatra	Sudi Green	May 28, 2026
14	4	"Icky Boys"	Fawzia Mirza	Nikki Kashani	May 28, 2026
15	5	"DarCo Boys"	Fawzia Mirza	Feraz Ozel	May 28, 2026
16	6	"Manly Boys"	Fawzia Mirza	Mehar Sethi & Sudi Green & Michelle Nader	May 28, 2026

== Production ==
The series Deli Boys was ordered for a pilot by Onyx Collective in October 2022. On May 11, 2023 it was announced that Onyx Collective picked up the comedy series Deli Boys for a 10-episode order. The series was created by Abdullah Saeed and developed in collaboration with executive producers Jenni Konner and Nora Silver. Vali Chandrasekaran, Nisha Ganatra (who directed the pilot), and Michelle Nader (showrunner) are also executive producers. Deli Boys is the first scripted series created by Saeed. He named The Godfather, Hogan's Heroes, Bored to Death, and Office Space as influences for the show.

Deli Boys was filmed in Chicago, which began in January 2024 after a delay in production resultant from the WGA and SAG-AFTRA strikes. Filming wrapped on April 5, 2024. Filming locations include Essence of India in Lincoln Square, Rogers Park, 2330 W Wilson Avenue, and McKinley Park.

In October 2022, Asif Ali, Saagar Shaikh, and Alfie Fuller were announced as main cast members. Ten additional cast members were announced on May 3, 2024: recurring cast members Kevin Corrigan, Alexandra Ruddy (Abdullah Saeed's wife), Tim Baltz, Zainne Saleh, Sakina Jaffrey, Amita Rao, Anish Jethmalani, and Minita Gandhi; and guest stars Geoffrey Arend and Azhar Usman. Poorna Jagannathan and Brian George were also announced as main cast members. On January 26, 2025, fashion stylist and Queer Eye star Tan France was announced as a guest star in the role of Zubair, a well-dressed gang leader. It is his first acting role. In August 2025, Hulu renewed the series for a second season, with Fred Armisen joining the cast as a new series regular.

== Release ==
Deli Boys premiered at Sundance 2025 in January. A teaser trailer was released on January 30, 2025. The series became available for streaming on Hulu in the United States on March 6, 2025. Internationally, Deli Boys was released on Disney+.

All six episodes of Season 2 were released on Hulu in the United States on May 28, 2026. The series was cancelled after two seasons.

== Reception ==
=== Viewership ===
TVision, using its Power Score to evaluate CTV programming through viewership and engagement across over 1,000 apps, calculated that Deli Boys was the eleventh most-streamed series from March 3–9. The series ranked No. 14 on Hulu's "Top 15 Today" list—a daily updated list of the platform's most-watched titles—on March 7. Deli Boys maintained the same position at No. 14 on Hulu on March 11. The streaming aggregator Reelgood, which tracks real-time data from 20 million U.S. users for original and acquired content across SVOD and AVOD services, reported that it ranked as the tenth most-streamed show in the U.S. for the week ending March 12. Market research company Parrot Analytics, which looks at consumer engagement in consumer research, streaming, downloads, and on social media, reported that Deli Boys reached demand levels 9.9 times the average show in the United Kingdom during March 2025. This performance placed it in the top 2.7% of all TV shows by demand, with a 112.7% increase in audience demand over the month. The show ranked in the 98th percentile for the comedy genre.

=== Critical response ===
On the review aggregator website Rotten Tomatoes, 96% of 24 critics' reviews are positive, with an average rating of 7.5/10. The website's consensus reads: "A tasty crime caper where the laughs come first, Deli Boys busts a gut with Asif Ali and Saagar Shaikh's bumbling chemistry and Poorna Jagannathan's scene-stealing turn." On Metacritic, the series holds a weighted average score of 74/100 based on 11 critics, indicating "generally favorable" reviews.

Devan Suber from IGN gave Deli Boys a rating of 9 out of 10, calling it a standout crime comedy with sharp humor, cultural relevance, and fast-paced dialogue. He praised Jagannathan's performance, naming her one of the best new TV characters of the year. While Suber noted that lead actors Saagar Shaikh and Asif Ali took some time to settle into their roles, he found the series consistently engaging. He also appreciated how Deli Boys highlighted aspects of the Pakistani immigrant experience without losing its comedic focus. Kourtnee Jackson from CNET described Deli Boys as a wildly entertaining mix of dark comedy, crime drama, and action, comparing it to Weeds and The Brothers Sun. She highlighted the strong chemistry between Asif Ali and Saagar Shaikh as the Dar brothers and praised Jagannathan's performance as a memorable mentor. Although Jackson questioned the moral aspects of the characters' actions, she ultimately found the series engaging and entertaining.

Tania Hussain of Collider appreciated the show for its fast-paced, irreverent humor and sharp writing, blending absurd situations with authentic cultural elements. She found the performances of Ali and Shaikh to be particularly impressive, noting their strong chemistry and impeccable comedic timing. Hussain stated that the supporting cast, especially Jagannathan, added depth to the show. She complimented the series for its unpredictable storytelling, vibrant character dynamics, and unique mix of comedy and crime. Alison Herman of Variety stated that Deli Boys provides a fresh take on the crime comedy genre, using farcical humor to explore mafia tropes from a Pakistani American perspective. She praised the show's blend of dark comedy and cultural specificity. Jagannathan's portrayal of Auntie Lucky was noted as a standout performance, and the show's quick pacing and sitcom-style storytelling added to its appeal. However, Herman felt the series lacked emotional depth but concluded that Deli Boys remains a unique and engaging addition to Hulu's lineup.

=== Accolades ===
Deli Boys was nominated for Best Comedy TV Spot - TV/Streaming Series at the 2025 Golden Trailer Awards. At the 2025 Gotham TV Awards, Saagar Shaikh was nominated for Outstanding Lead Performance in a Comedy Series, while Poorna Jagannathan won for Outstanding Supporting Performance in a Comedy Series.
