= Easter Sunday (film) =

2022 American film by Jay Chandrasekhar

- Theatrical release poster
- Directed by: Jay Chandrasekhar
- Screenplay by: Ken Cheng; Kate Angelo
- Story by: Ken Cheng
- Produced by: Dan Lin; Jonathan Eirich
- Starring: Jo Koy; Eugene Cordero; Tia Carrere; Asif Ali; Lou Diamond Phillips
- Cinematography: Joe Collins
- Edited by: Steven Sprung
- Music by: Dan the Automator
- Production companies: DreamWorks Pictures; Reliance Entertainment; Rideback
- Distributed by: Universal Pictures
- Release date: August 5, 2022
- Running time: 96 minutes
- Countries: United States; India
- Languages: English; Filipino
- Budget: $17 million
- Box office: $13.1 million

Easter Sunday is a 2022 American comedy film directed by Jay Chandrasekhar and written by Ken Cheng and Kate Angelo from a story by Cheng. It stars Jo Koy as a struggling actor, comedian, and single father who attends a gathering of his loud and dysfunctional Filipino American family on Easter Sunday. In addition to Koy, the film stars Tia Carrere, Brandon Wardell, Eugene Cordero, Asif Ali, Lydia Gaston, Jimmy O. Yang, and Lou Diamond Phillips.

Easter Sunday was theatrically released in the United States on August 5, 2022 by Universal Pictures. It received mixed reviews from critics and grossed $13.1 million worldwide.

== Plot ==
Joe Valencia is a comedian and struggling actor in Los Angeles, known for his beer commercial catch-phrase, "Let's Get This Party Started". He is also a single father to his son Junior, though his work schedule often comes first.

Joe's agent Nick obtains a sitcom audition, but when the producer learns he is half-Filipino, the role turns stereotypical. The audition also causes Joe to miss a school meeting with Junior and his teachers. To compensate, Joe resolves to take Junior with him to his family's Easter Sunday celebration in Daly City for the weekend.

Joe and Junior arrive and meet with Joe's mom, Susan, and his sister, Regina, his cousin Eugene, his aunt Yvonne, uncles Arthur and Manny, and aunt Theresa (who is feuding with Susan). The family goes to church, where Joe learns Eugene wasted an investment meant for a taco truck on a "hype truck" selling useless merchandise.

Joe learns Eugene borrowed from a gangster named Dev in order to pay for the hype truck merchandise. They attempt to get money from a wealthy acquaintance Marvin by pawning off Manny Pacquiao's boxing gloves from his fight with Oscar De La Hoya, which Eugene stole from Dev. Marvin refuses, knowing Dev's ruthless reputation.

Joe and Eugene go to the mall with Junior, who runs into Tala, his crush, at her workplace. They find out Tala's boss is Dev, who spots them and chases them out of the mall. Joe and Eugene go to a mysterious man called "The Jeweler" who can help buy Pacquiao's gloves. The Jeweler ends up being Lou Diamond Phillips who agrees to give them the money they seek later.

On Easter Sunday, the family is preparing for dinner, but Nick informs Joe that he booked him a flight back to Los Angeles to meet with a producer for the show, and assures the role is guaranteed if Joe plays to stereotype, but Joe refuses. The flight also happens to be at the same time as the dinner. Junior invites Tala to the dinner, and everyone teases Junior about possibly having a girlfriend. Susan and Theresa keep bickering, which is revealed to have begun when Theresa called Susan a bad mother for supposedly not taking care of Joe. As Joe calms them down, Junior sees Joe's texts from Nick about the show, prompting Junior to call Joe a hypocrite. He storms out, and Tala runs after him. As the dinner grows more tense, Joe gives a speech about family and brings everyone together to sing karaoke, cheering everyone up. Susan and Theresa appear to reconcile, just as Dev and his goons arrive.

Susan and Theresa try to pay Dev back, but Dev takes Junior as a hostage. Arthur distracts Dev while Joe puts on the gloves and runs outside. He punches Dev, knocking him out, and they wait for the police. Vanessa, Joe's ex and now an officer, shows up to arrest Dev. When the family goes back inside, Joe finds that his video chat was on and Nick and the producer were watching. Before Joe can explain himself, he suffers a panic attack and faints.

Joe wakes up in the hospital with the rest of the family at his bedside. The producer tells Joe she wants to create a sitcom centered around Joe and his family rather than the one from the audition. Joe agrees, and the family celebrates. Later, Joe's family is seen giving pointers to the cast of Joe's new show.

== Cast ==
- Jo Koy as Joe Valencia, a down on his luck comedian
- Eugene Cordero as Eugene, Joe's cousin
- Tia Carrere as Tita Teresa
- Asif Ali as Dev Deluxe
- Jimmy O. Yang as Marvin
- Lou Diamond Phillips as a fictionalized version of himself (The Jeweler); he plays Eugene in the sitcom about Joe Valencia's Filipino family
- Lydia Gaston as Susan Valencia, Joe and Regina's mom
- Brandon Wardell as Joe Valencia Jr, aka Junior, Joe's son.
- Eva Noblezada as Tala, Junior's love interest
- Rodney To as Tito Arthur
- Melody Butiu as Tito Yvonne
- Joey Guila as Tito Manny
- Elena Juatco as Regina, Joe's sister
- Carly Pope as Catherine, Joe's ex-wife
- Dustin Ybarra as Alfonso
- Michael Weaver as Kyle, Catherine's new husband
- Rodney Perry as Father Hildo
- Jay Chandrasekhar as Nick, Joe Valencia's agent
- Tiffany Haddish (uncredited) as Vanessa, a police officer who was Joe's former fling.
- Garette Ratliff Henson as Man (Uncredited)

== Production ==
Easter Sunday from director Jay Chandrasekhar was announced on February 16, 2021, with Jo Koy attached to star. In April, Eva Noblezada and Brandon Wardell joined the cast. In May, Lou Diamond Phillips was cast as a fictionalized version of himself.

Principal photography began on May 3, 2021, in Vancouver. The movie was never filmed in Daly City, California due to strict traffic rules in Daly City in obtaining a film permit. On May 29, Sharon Cuneta revealed that she was originally going to star in the film but had to drop out due to a false positive COVID-19 test; her role was given to Tia Carrere. In July, Universal Pictures confirmed that Jimmy O. Yang, Lydia Gaston, Rodney To, Chandrasekhar, and Tiffany Haddish were part of the cast.

== Release ==
In February 2022, the film's release date was postponed from April 1, 2022 — shortly before the Easter holiday — to August 5 of the same year.

The film was released for VOD platforms on August 23, 2022, followed by a Blu-ray and DVD release on October 18, 2022.

== Reception ==
=== Box office ===
In the United States and Canada, Easter Sunday was released alongside Bullet Train, and was projected to gross $5–7 million from 3,175 theaters in its opening weekend. The film made $2 million on its first day, including $500,000 from Thursday night previews. It went on to debut to $6 million, finishing seventh at the box office. Women made up 55% of the audience, with 29% being over 45 years old; 37% was Asian, with 31% Caucasian, 15% Latino/Hispanic, and 11% African-American. It made $2.4 million in its sophomore weekend, finishing 11th.

=== Critical response ===
On the review aggregator website Rotten Tomatoes, 40% of 68 critics' reviews are positive, with an average rating of 4.9/10. The website's consensus reads: "Easter Sunday's refreshing representation is frustratingly undermined by stale gags and an unimaginative approach to its numbingly familiar story." Metacritic assigned the film a weighted average score of 41 out of 100, based on 18 critics, indicating "mixed or average" reviews. Audiences polled by CinemaScore gave the film an average grade of "B+" on an A+ to F scale, while PostTrak gave the film a 71% overall positive score, with 49% saying they would definitely recommend it.

== See also ==
- List of Easter films
