= Saagar Shaikh =

American actor (born 1986)

- ساگر شيخ
- Born: 1986 (age 39–40); Alief, Texas, U.S.
- Education: University of Texas at San Antonio
- Occupation: Actor
- Known for: Ms. Marvel, Deli Boys

Saagar Shaikh (Sindhi: ساگر شيخ;born 1986) is an American actor best known for his roles as Aamir Khan on Ms. Marvel and Raj Dar on Deli Boys, for which he won the Breakthrough Actor Spotlight Award at the 2025 Astra TV Awards.

== Early life and education ==
Shaikh was born in Alief, Texas and raised in Houston until age 14, when his family moved to San Antonio. He is of Pakistani Sindhi descent and was raised in a Muslim family. He has two brothers. His father worked at a gas station and eventually became the owner of three convenience stores. Shaikh worked part-time at his father's convenience store when he was a teenager. He graduated from John Marshall High School in 2005 and received his bachelor's degree in business from University of Texas at San Antonio.

== Career ==
Shaikh began to pivot to acting while in college after he secured an internship at a talent management company. Against his parents' wishes, he moved to Los Angeles to pursue acting full-time after graduation. Shaikh struggled to find acting roles due to limited opportunities for South Asian actors. In 2015 he began to take post-production jobs to stay employed in the entertainment industry even though his primary interest was acting. He worked in post-production roles for five years, including as a production assistant and occasional on-camera crew member for the YouTube series Good Mythical Morning hosted by Rhett & Link. He also took classes and performed at UCB Theatre for several years. Shaikh is a founding member of The Get Brown, a South Asian comedy troupe that formed at UCB in 2018.

He gained prominence in the role of Aamir Khan on the Disney+ series Ms. Marvel. He also appeared in the film The Marvels. Shaikh also co-hosted the comedy podcast The Bollywood Boys with Shaan Baig, where they revisit classic and some contemporary Bollywood films. He was a lead role in the 2025 Hulu comedy Deli Boys, created by Abdullah Saeed.

Shaikh returned to his alma mater University of Texas at San Antonio in the spring semester 2026 as a professor of practice to teach a course in the dramatic arts program.

== Personal life ==
Shaikh is married.

== Awards and nominations ==
=== For Deli Boys: ===
- 2025 – Nominee, Gotham TV Award for Outstanding Lead Performance in a Comedy Series
- 2025 – Winner, Astra TV Awards, Breakthrough Actor Spotlight Award
- 2026 – Winner, IndieWire Honors Breakthrough Award

== Filmography ==
=== Film ===
Year	Title	Role	Notes	Ref.
2013	Chavez Cage of Glory	Bar Patron		
2014	Welcome to Forever	Bruce		
2023	The Marvels	Aamir Khan		

=== Television ===
Year	Title	Role	Notes	Ref.
2015-2016	Just Giggle It	Matt / Weight-Lifter		
2016	Average Joe	Sound Guy		
2018	Unfair & Ugly	Haaris Shaikh		
2018	Yeoja	Amit		
2019	Liza on Demand	Office-Topia Worker		
2022	Ms. Marvel	Aamir Khan	Recurring role	
2025–2026	Deli Boys	Raj Dar	Main role	
