= Zenobia Shroff =

American actress (born 1965)

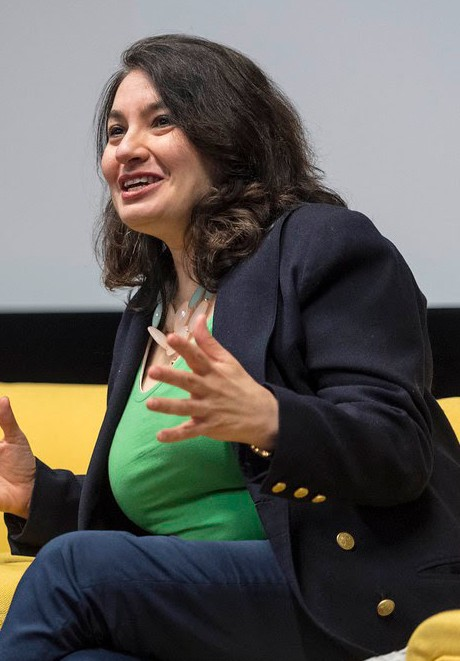
- Shroff in 2018
- Born: May 27, 1965 (age 61); Bombay, India (present-day Mumbai)
- Citizenship: United States
- Education: Circle in the Square Theatre School
- Occupations: Actress; comedian; model
- Years active: 1981–present
- Known for: Muneeba Khan in the Marvel Cinematic Universe

Zenobia Shroff (born May 27, 1965) is an Indian-born American actress and former model. Shroff has been an actress, writer, teaching artist and sketch comedian for over 30 years and she is known for her role in the 2017 film The Big Sick, and as Muneeba Khan in the Marvel Cinematic Universe.

== Early life ==
Shroff grew up in a Zoroastrian Parsi family in South Bombay, in what is now known as Mumbai.

== Career ==
Shroff began her professional career at age sixteen as a commercial print model. After seven successful years as a model, she switched to acting. She got her acting start in Mumbai under the mentorship of Pearl Padamsee. She then moved to study acting at New York City's Circle in the Square Theatre School. Soon after, she appeared at the Broadway Castillo Theatre, where she played several roles such as Nora in Henrik Ibsen's A Doll's House to German avant-gardist Heiner Müller. She also performed in Erotic Adventures in Venice at the La MaMa Experimental Theatre Club, in Milan Kundera's Jacques and His Master, and in Christopher Hampton's Les Liaisons Dangereuses. She made her acting debut in the 1989 film Percy.

=== 2007–2016 ===
In 2007, she was cast as Roxanne in Little Zizou, written and directed by Sooni Taraporevala. For that role she was nominated as best actress at the New York Indian film festival. A few years later, she appeared in When Harry Tries to Marry, an American romantic comedy film. She followed that up with her first Bollywood film, Ek Main Aur Ekk Tu alongside Imran Khan. The film received critical acclaim. Her solo show, Show How to Succeed as an Ethnically Ambiguous Actor premiered at the Planet Connections Festival in June 2016. For that performance she has been nominated as Outstanding Solo Performer.

Shroff has been a lifelong dancer, starting with the classical Indian temple dance, Bharat Natyam for several years and moving onto jazz and modern as a young adult. She is a founding company member of the Shiamak Davar dance company with whom she toured nationally doing musical theatre including playing Anita in West Side Story, Cabaret, and A Chorus Line.

=== 2017–present ===
She has performed stand-up at the Guild Gallery, the Indo American Arts Council, Don't Tell Mama, UCB and the South Asian International Performing Arts Festival. She went on to perform her show, Show How to Succeed as an Ethnically Ambiguous Actor, with over 30 characters in and off-Broadway at the Castillo Theatre in a full run in the summer of 2017. Also in 2017, she was cast as Kumail Nanjiani's mother in The Big Sick, produced by Judd Apatow. The cast was nominated for a Screen Actors Guild Awards in 2018.

She has appeared in the American medical drama series The Resident, American political drama television series Madam Secretary, and a recurring role as Priya Ullah in seasons 4 and 5 of The Affair. In 2020, she voiced one of the many counselors named “Jerry”, in the Disney-Pixar film Soul.

In 2022, she was cast as Muneeba Khan in the Marvel Studios series Ms. Marvel on Disney+. She reprised the role in the 2023 film The Marvels.

== Personal life ==
She holds a master's degree in Psychology.

== Filmography ==
Key
†	Denotes films that have not yet been released

=== Film ===
Year	Title	Role	Notes	Refs.
1989	Percy	Vera		
2008	Little Zizou	Roxanne Pressvala		
2010	When Harry Tries to Marry	Geeta Shankar		
2012	Ek Main Aur Ekk Tu	Nicole Braganza		
2016	Misaligned	Nadia's Mother	Short film	
2017	The Big Sick	Sharmeen		
2019	(t)here	Geeta (Mother)	Short film	
2020	Save Yourselves!	Su's Mom	Voice role	
2020	Soul	Counselor Jerry	Voice role	
2021	Unpacking	Mother	Short film	
2021	7 Days	Rita's Mom		
2023	The Marvels	Muneeba Khan		
2025	This Tempting Madness	Lakshmi		
2026	Rishta	Noreen Auntie	Short film	
TBA	Rest and Relaxation †	Roshni	Post-production	

=== Television ===
Year	Title	Role	Notes	Refs.
2018–2019	The Resident	Himaya Pravesh	3 episodes	
2018	The Affair	Priya Ullah	6 episodes	
2018	The Greatest American Hero	Leena	TV film	
2018	Madam Secretary	Indian Prime Minister Vanya Kharti	Episode: "E Pluribus Unum"	
2022	Ms. Marvel	Muneeba Khan	Main role (6 episodes)	
2025	Marvel Zombies	Muneeba Khan (voice)	1 episode	

== Awards ==
=== Actor Awards ===
Year	Category	Nominated work	Result
2018	Outstanding Performance by a Cast in a Motion Picture	The Big Sick	Nominated
