= Bong Appétit =

American television series

- Presented by: Abdullah Saeed

Original release
- Network: Viceland
- Release: December 14, 2016 – June 4, 2019

Bong Appétit is a television series produced by Viceland. The series debuted in 2016. According to NJ.com, Abdullah Saeed "hosts extravagant cannabis dinners featuring chefs that are famous in the cannabis community for their expertise."

The third season, Bong Appétit: Cook Off, has a different format. The season "adds a competitive twist, pitting three seasoned chefs against each other to see who can cook the best marijuana-infused dishes." Celebrities join hosts rapper B-Real, Vanessa Lavorato and chef/restaurateur Miguel Trinidad.

A tie-in cookbook, Bong Appétit: Mastering the Art of Cooking with Weed, containing 65 recipes was released in 2018.

== See also ==
- List of programs broadcast by Vice
