= Ms. Marvel (miniseries) =

2022 Marvel Studios television miniseries

- Genre: Action-adventure; Comedy; Coming-of-age; Superhero
- Created by: Bisha K. Ali
- Based on: Marvel Comics
- Starring: Iman Vellani; Matt Lintz; Yasmeen Fletcher; Zenobia Shroff; Mohan Kapur; Saagar Shaikh; Laurel Marsden; Azhar Usman; Rish Shah; Arian Moayed; Alysia Reiner; Laith Nakli; Nimra Bucha; Travina Springer; Adaku Ononogbo; Samina Ahmad; Fawad Khan; Mehwish Hayat; Farhan Akhtar; Aramis Knight
- Music by: Laura Karpman
- Country of origin: United States
- Original language: English
- No. of seasons: 1
- No. of episodes: 6

Production
- Executive producers: Kevin Feige; Louis D'Esposito; Victoria Alonso; Brad Winderbaum; Sana Amanat; Adil & Bilall; Bisha K. Ali
- Production locations: Atlanta, Georgia; New Jersey; Thailand
- Cinematography: Robrecht Heyvaert; Carmen Cabana; Jules O'Loughlin
- Editors: Nona Khodai; Sabrina Plisco; Emma McCleave; Sushila Love
- Running time: 38–50 minutes
- Production company: Marvel Studios

Original release
- Network: Disney+
- Release: June 8 – July 13, 2022

Related
- The Marvels; Marvel Cinematic Universe television series

Ms. Marvel is an American television miniseries created by Bisha K. Ali for the streaming service Disney+, based on Marvel Comics featuring the character Kamala Khan / Ms. Marvel. It is the seventh television series in the Marvel Cinematic Universe (MCU) produced by Marvel Studios, sharing continuity with the films of the franchise. It follows Kamala Khan, a 16-year-old fangirl of the Avengers who struggles to fit in until she gains her own powers. Ali served as head writer with Adil & Bilall leading the directing team.

Iman Vellani stars as Kamala Khan, with Matt Lintz, Yasmeen Fletcher, Zenobia Shroff, Mohan Kapur, Saagar Shaikh, Laurel Marsden, Azhar Usman, Rish Shah, Arian Moayed, Alysia Reiner, Laith Nakli, Nimra Bucha, Travina Springer, Adaku Ononogbo, Samina Ahmad, Fawad Khan, Mehwish Hayat, Farhan Akhtar, and Aramis Knight also starring. The series was announced with Ali's involvement in August 2019. Vellani was cast in September 2020, with Adil & Bilall, Meera Menon, and Sharmeen Obaid-Chinoy hired as the series' directors. Filming began in early November 2020, shooting in Atlanta, Georgia, and New Jersey, before concluding in Thailand in May 2021.

Ms. Marvel premiered on June 8, 2022, and ran for six episodes until July 13. It is part of Phase Four of the MCU. The series received positive reviews, particularly for its creative visual style and Vellani's performance. Ms. Marvel sets up the events of the film The Marvels (2023), in which Vellani reprises her role as Kamala.

== Premise ==
Kamala Khan, a 16-year-old fangirl of the Avengers, particularly Carol Danvers / Captain Marvel, struggles to fit in until she gains her own powers.

== Cast and characters ==
- Iman Vellani as Kamala Khan / Ms. Marvel:
  A 16-year-old Pakistani-American high school student from Jersey City. Kamala is an aspiring artist, avid gamer, and writes superhero fan fiction about heroes such as Carol Danvers / Captain Marvel. She gains the ability to harness cosmic energy and create hard light constructs from a magical bangle, and is revealed to be a mutant in the series finale. Executive producer Sana Amanat said Kamala brought a grounded perspective to the MCU with "bright and eager eyes". Vellani said Kamala enjoys the simplicity of a life with powers, instead of worrying about high school, relationships, family drama, or culture and religion. She related to the character due to their similar background, ethnicity, and love for the Marvel universe. Head writer Bisha K. Ali described Kamala as an "avatar" for all of the viewers who had grown up with the MCU.
- Matt Lintz as Bruno Carrelli:
  Kamala's best friend and a tech genius who has a crush on her. Lintz called Bruno "very loyal" to Kamala, more so after she gets her powers, as it creates a new dynamic between them.
- Yasmeen Fletcher as Nakia Bahadir:
  Kamala's close friend, who runs for a position on the mosque board. Fletcher called Nakia "strong" and "kind of a badass", who speaks her mind and is confident in who she is, adding that she is "opinionated and is willing to fight for anything that she believes in", as well as a character that "breaks a lot of the stereotypes for hijab girls". Director Meera Menon felt Nakia had the "ability to communicate confidence" when needed, while still being "a vulnerable teenage kid, figuring it out like everyone else". In Ms. Marvel, Nakia is Lebanese-American and mixed race, like Fletcher, compared to the comics version who is Turkish-American.
- Zenobia Shroff as Muneeba Khan:
  Kamala's mother and Yusuf's wife. She is stricter on Kamala than Yusuf, with Shroff saying it comes from her knowing Kamala's potential while still wanting to "protect her from all that".
- Mohan Kapur as Yusuf Khan:
  Kamala's father and Muneeba's husband. Kapur described Yusuf as "a warm, caring, compassionate man", who is more understanding of Kamala and her dreams than Muneeba.
- Saagar Shaikh as Aamir Khan:
  Kamala's older brother. Shaikh described Aamir as "kind of aloof and is not as funny as he thinks he is", who is also very religious, and serves as a middleman between Kamala and their parents.
- Laurel Marsden as Zoe Zimmer: The most popular girl at Kamala's high school and a social media influencer.
- Azhar Usman as Najaf: A halal food vendor acquainted with Kamala.
- Rish Shah as Kamran:
  A boy Kamala has a crush on. Shah believed Kamran is able to relate to Kamala so easily because he had a "a lack of belonging and community" and is able to express himself culturally around her.
- Arian Moayed as P. Cleary: A Department of Damage Control (DODC) agent.
- Alysia Reiner as Sadie Deever: A DODC agent working with Cleary.
- Laith Nakli as Sheikh Abdullah: An imam at Kamala's mosque.
- Nimra Bucha as Najma: Kamran's mother, who is the leader of the Clandestines, a group of Djinn trying to return to their home Noor dimension after being exiled on Earth.
- Travina Springer as Tyesha Hillman: Aamir's wife.
- Adaku Ononogbo as Fariha: A member of the Clandestines who wields a spear.
- Samina Ahmad as Sana: Kamala's grandmother who lives in Karachi, Pakistan. Zion Usman portrays a young Sana.
- Fawad Khan as Hasan: Kamala's great-grandfather.
- Mehwish Hayat as Aisha: Kamala's great-grandmother, a member of the Clandestines and the original owner of the bangle.
- Farhan Akhtar as Waleed: The leader of the Red Daggers, a group of vigilantes who wear red bandanas and wield throwing knives.
- Aramis Knight as Kareem / Red Dagger:
  A member of the Red Daggers. Knight trained with a dialect coach so he could speak Urdu and have a Pakistani accent to "appear like a kid from Karachi" and was "really happy to represent for the culture".

Recurring in the series are Jordan Firstman as school counselor Gabe Wilson, and Anjali Bhimani and Sophia Mahmud as Aunties Ruby and Zara. Additional guest stars include Ali Alsaleh and Dan Carter as Aadam and Saleem, members of the Clandestines who wield a golden mace and powered whip, respectively; and Vardah Aziz and Asfandyar Khan as Kamala's cousins Zainab and Owais, respectively. Ryan Penagos, vice president and creative executive at Marvel New Media, has a cameo appearance as the cosplay competition host at AvengerCon. Directors Adil El Arbi and Bilall Fallah make cameo appearances as a man in the mosque and one of the "Mosque Bros", respectively, while Amanat cameos during Aamir and Hillman's wedding, and G. Willow Wilson cameos as herself as a TikTok commentator. Brie Larson makes an uncredited cameo as Carol Danvers / Captain Marvel in the series finale's mid-credits scene. A photo of Jameela Jamil as Titania, who stars as the character in the Disney+ series She-Hulk: Attorney at Law (2022), appears in the series; Jamil was unaware of its inclusion in Ms. Marvel until it aired.

== Episodes ==
No.	Title	Directed by	Written by	Original release date
1	"Generation Why"	Adil & Bilall	Bisha K. Ali	June 8, 2022
Kamala Khan is a 16-year-old high schooler and fangirl of the Avengers, particularly Carol Danvers / Captain Marvel. After failing a driving test, Kamala and her best friend Bruno Carrelli finish her Captain Marvel cosplay for "AvengerCon" while avoiding her strict parents, Yusuf and Muneeba. Kamala receives a package from her grandmother Sana that includes a golden bangle, which Muneeba says is junk. After failing to convince her parents to let her go to AvengerCon, Kamala sneaks out with Bruno to attend and takes the bangle as part of her cosplay. After getting there and dressing up, she puts on the bangle and it causes her to project constructs of cosmic energy. This inadvertently causes havoc, during which Kamala uses her powers to save her classmate Zoe Zimmer. Bruno rushes Kamala home, where a distraught Muneeba pleads with her to focus on her own life. In a mid-credits scene, Department of Damage Control (DODC) agents P. Cleary and Sadie Deever watch a video of Kamala's incident at AvengerCon and head to New Jersey to find and detain her.
2	"Crushed"	Meera Menon	Kate Gritmon	June 15, 2022
Kamala begins training to control her powers with Bruno, who deduces that the bangle activated superpowers that Kamala already had within her. Kamala, Bruno, and their friend Nakia Bahadir attend a party organized by Zimmer, where they meet a new senior, Kamran, who Kamala befriends. Bruno becomes frustrated when Kamala chooses to spend time with Kamran instead of training. After seeing a vision of a mysterious woman, Kamala asks Sana and Muneeba about her great-grandmother Aisha, the bangle's original owner, but both dismiss her. Yusuf says young Sana lost her way during the partition of India, but was mysteriously able to find her father again. After questioning Zimmer about her savior at AvengerCon, Cleary and Deever order a sweep of the tri-state area, targeting South Asian communities. At an Eid al-Adha celebration, a young boy slips from a mosque balcony and almost falls before Kamala saves him with her powers. Kamala is chased by DODC agents led by Deever, but is saved by Kamran, who introduces her to his mother Najma, the woman from Kamala's vision.
3	"Destined"	Meera Menon	Teleplay by : Freddy Syborn and A. C. Bradley & Matthew Chauncey; Story by : Freddy Syborn	June 22, 2022
Najma explains that she and Kamran are part of a group of five enhanced beings known as the Clandestines, who claim to be Djinns that were exiled from the Noor dimension. Najma says Aisha was also a Clandestine, and asks for Kamala's help in using the bangle to let them return to the Noor dimension. Kamala agrees, but Bruno warns her that interdimensional travel could be dangerous, so she asks Kamran for more time to ensure that they can do it safely. Kamran agrees, but an impatient Najma decides to force Kamala to help them. Kamala's brother Aamir marries his fiancée Tyesha Hillman, but Kamran crashes the wedding to warn Kamala before the other Clandestines arrive. Kamala, Bruno, and Kamran are overpowered while Najma tries to use the bangle, which triggers a vision of a train. The DODC agents arrive and capture the Clandestines, including Kamran. As Kamala and Bruno escape, Nakia sees Kamala using her powers. Sana contacts Kamala, revealing that she also saw the vision of the train and insisting that Kamala and Muneeba visit her in Karachi.
4	"Seeing Red"	Sharmeen Obaid-Chinoy	Teleplay by : Sabir Pirzada and A. C. Bradley & Matthew Chauncey; Story by : Sabir Pirzada	June 29, 2022
Kamala and Muneeba travel to Karachi and reunite with Sana, who reveals to Kamala that the bangle is trying to convey a message through the vision of the train. The next day, a masked Kamala goes to the Karachi train station to investigate, but is attacked by Kareem, a member of the Red Daggers vigilante group who initially mistakes her for one of the Clandestines. Kareem takes Kamala to the Red Daggers' hideout, where Kamala learns from their leader Waleed that the Clandestines are trying to break the Veil of Noor, which separates the Noor dimension from the human world, in order to expand and take over. The Clandestines escape the DODC's supermax prison, but Najma abandons Kamran for his betrayal. Kamala begins training with the Red Daggers to master her powers, but they are interrupted by the Clandestines. A chase ensues, during which Waleed kills one of the Clandestines before Najma kills him in turn. As Kamala and Kareem fend off the Clandestines, Kareem kills one of them and Najma accidentally stabs the bangle, sending Kamala back in time to the partition.
5	"Time and Again"	Sharmeen Obaid-Chinoy	Fatimah Asghar	July 6, 2022
In India, 1942, Aisha takes refuge in a village, where Hasan, an Indian independence activist, offers her food and shelter. They fall in love and have a child, Sana. Five years later, Najma finds Aisha and orders her to retrieve the bangle. Aisha leaves it with Sana and attempts to flee to the new nation of Pakistan with her family, but Najma finds and stabs her. Hasan and Sana are separated in the chaos. Kamala is able to interact with Aisha, who asks her to guide Sana before dying. Conjuring a projection of stars to lead Sana to her father, Kamala realizes that she was the one who reunited them per the stories her parents had told of that night. Returning to the present, Kamala finds that Najma's strike had opened the Veil of Noor, but it vaporizes anyone who interacts with it. Najma transfers her power to Kamran before sacrificing herself to close the Veil. Sana and Muneeba find Kamala and the latter accepts her daughter's powers. Kamran seeks refuge with Bruno, where they are both attacked by a DODC drone. Kamran destroys it, but the ensuing explosion obliterates the store below them.
6	"No Normal"	Adil & Bilall	Teleplay by : Will Dunn and A. C. Bradley & Matthew Chauncey; Story by : Will Dunn	July 13, 2022
Bruno and Kamran go on the run from the DODC, but Deever orders a city-wide lockdown to find them. Kamala crafts a disguise using a gift from her mother and a mask made by Bruno, before reuniting with Bruno and Kamran. With help from Nakia, Aamir, and Zimmer, the group stall the DODC agents. Cleary orders a retreat, but Deever ignores him and leads a detachment of agents in storming the school where Kamala and her friends are hiding. The agents arrest everyone except for Kamala and Kamran, who confronts Deever. She attacks him, but Kamala fights off the agents and allows all of her friends to escape. Deever withdraws and is later relieved of her duty by Cleary. Kamala becomes a beloved figure in her community and takes the superhero name "Ms. Marvel" following a heart-to-heart with Yusuf. Kamran flees to Pakistan and meets Kareem, as arranged by Kamala. Bruno later tells Kamala that she possesses a genetic mutation which the rest of her family lacks. (Note: It was confirmed by Vellani that Kamala is the first mutant in the MCU.) In a mid-credits scene, the bangle emits a strange glow before Kamala switches places with Danvers. (Note: As depicted in The Marvels (2023))

== Production ==
=== Development ===
Marvel Entertainment's creative consultant Joe Quesada said in September 2016 that there were plans to explore the character of Kamala Khan / Ms. Marvel in other media following her unusually rapid success and popularity among comic book readers. Marvel Studios President Kevin Feige said in May 2018 that a Marvel Cinematic Universe (MCU) project based on Kamala Khan was "in the works", and would follow the release of the film Captain Marvel (2019) as Kamala is inspired by that film's title character Carol Danvers.

By August 2019, Marvel Studios had begun development on a Ms. Marvel television series for the streaming service Disney+, with Bisha K. Ali hired to serve as the head writer after working as a writer on the series Loki. Ali had approached one of the Marvel Studios executives on Loki, Kevin R. Wright, while were working on that series to get an opportunity to meet about Ms. Marvel, and she declined an extension to continue working on Loki in order to create her pitch. She believed that Marvel responded to her "general vibe and energy" from the pitch, which conveyed to them that a series about Ms. Marvel was very personal to her "as a fan, as a South Asian person, as a Pakistani woman, [and] as a woman from a Muslim background". Ms. Marvel was officially announced at the 2019 D23 conference.

In September 2020, Adil El Arbi and Bilall Fallah (credited as Adil & Bilall) were hired to direct two episodes of the series, with Meera Menon hired to direct one episode, and Sharmeen Obaid-Chinoy hired to direct three; Menon and Obaid-Chinoy ultimately directed two episodes each. Despite their different visual styles and prior work, all of the directors worked closely together to create a "seamless transition" between their episodes. Ali, El Arbi, and Fallah serve as executive producers on the series and worked closely with Marvel Studios to develop it, with Kamala Khan co-creator Sana Amanat also serving as an executive producer, alongside Marvel Studios' Feige, Louis D'Esposito, Victoria Alonso, and Brad Winderbaum.

=== Writing ===
In addition to Ali, writers for the series include Kate Gritmon, Freddy Syborn, A. C. Bradley, Matthew Chauncey, Sabir Pirzada, Fatimah Asghar, and Will Dunn. Bradley and Chauncey were respectively the head writer, and story editor and writer for What If...?, joining Ms. Marvel after completing the scripts for What If...? season two, with Bradley also serving as a consulting producer on Ms. Marvel, while Pirzada was a writer for Moon Knight. Bradley stated that she "significantly [rewrote] all episodes" of the series, which in turn necessitated the WGA to mandate she receive writing credit on three of the episodes. Despite this work, Bradley claimed she was only paid a weekly rate and did not receive script fees. Ali said Amanat's involvement allowed them to "stay true to the character" from the comic books while adding "something new, with a freshness, vitality and contemporary edge". Ali described her time working on Loki as "good training ground" to serve as Ms. Marvel's head writer, learning what creative freedoms Marvel Studios allowed for each series to inhabit their own part of the MCU while still being bounded by the overarching storytelling. She was told to keep Kamala's story "ground level", which was already part of her plan for the series, and to always focus on who the character represents. Ali received advice from WandaVision and The Falcon and the Winter Soldier head writers Jac Schaeffer and Malcolm Spellman.

In Ms. Marvel, Kamala gains the ability to harness cosmic energy and create hard light constructs from a magical bangle, which differs from the shapeshifting abilities that she has in the comics. Feige explained that the Inhuman source of her abilities in the comics did not "match" with the timeline and events of the MCU, so her powers were adjusted to be related to her Pakistani heritage. They were also brought closer to the cosmic powers of the other heroes in the film The Marvels (2023), in which Vellani co-stars. Feige added that the character's "giant hands and arms" would still appear in the series "in spirit". The change to Kamala's powers was not part of Ali's initial pitch and arose as a group decision to align the character with what had been established in the MCU. It was important to the creative team that Kamala's new powers have the "same connectivity with her psychology and the journey she's going through and the way she sees herself" as her shapeshifting abilities did in the comics. Amanat and another of the character's co-creators, G. Willow Wilson, were both consulted on and supported the change. Amanat felt it was "fun to give Kamala different kinds of powers that feel big in scope and cinematic... the essence of what the powers are in the comics is there, both from a metaphorical standpoint and from a visual standpoint." The finale episode reveals that Kamala has a genetic "mutation", implying that she is a mutant (which is supported by a musical excerpt of the X-Men: The Animated Series theme being played during the reveal). Vellani confirmed that Kamala was the first mutant in the MCU, and Ali said this explains why other members of her family do not have powers. Amanat and Wilson originally intended for Kamala to be a mutant in the comics.

Ms. Marvel is a coming-of-age story that Amanat said would be told "through the lens of Kamala's experience and her wild imagination". She described Kamala's life and world as "naturally colorful" due to Jersey City being a "pretty crazy and vibrant and multicultural place". Carol Danvers is Kamala's inspiration to become a hero after she almost defeated Thanos during the events of Avengers: Endgame (2019). Amanat believed it was important to tell a story about who your heroes are for a young person of color, and exploring what that does to "your sense of self". Ali wanted to mix the "whimsical and magical" qualities from Ms. Marvel's comics with American high school films, taking specific inspiration from the films of John Hughes as well as 10 Things I Hate About You (1999), Lady Bird (2017), Eighth Grade (2018), Booksmart (2019), and the MCU film Spider-Man: Homecoming (2017). Bollywood actor Shah Rukh Khan was another inspiration for the series. Ms. Marvel features a love triangle between Kamala, Bruno Carrelli, and Kamran, which was toned down during the writing process because Ali did not want audiences to believe it was the dominant storyline. El Arbi said it was relatable that Bruno was in the "friend zone", and Ali felt this was a "fundamental part of growing up".

Kamala's family plays a large role in the series, which Ali felt was "vital" and a way to differentiate the character within the MCU. She wanted to explore "what's been passed down to [Kamala] through intergenerational trauma. I wanted to show these four generations of women and show that they are her superpower." Kamala's father also gives her the Ms. Marvel name, while her mother helps construct her costume. The partition of India is a major part of the series, and was included from the beginning of development. Ali looked to the film Captain America: The First Avenger (2011), which occurs at the end of World War II, to see how she could tie in the real-life events of the partition to what had been established in the MCU. Priya Satia, a professor at Stanford University and British Empire historian, consulted on the series. The writers created "essays" about how the Clandestines, the Noor dimension, and the Red Daggers were all connected. Ali explained that much of this was unable to be put into the final version of the series due to the COVID-19 pandemic and other time constraints, with the stories for the Clandestines and the Red Daggers having to be "truncated". Kamala and the Clandestines are referred to as Djinn in the series. When some Muslim fans pointed out that the Quran prohibits the worshipping of Djinn, Obaid-Chinoy responded that Djinn was just being used to represent "anyone who is different, or anyone who has powers". Ali elaborated that Kamala and the Clandestines were not actually Djinn, but the writers wanted to explore how Kamala would feel about the name due to its negative cultural connotations.

=== Casting ===
In September 2020, newcomer Iman Vellani was cast in the lead role. Her aunt had forwarded her a casting call for the role, which led to Vellani submitting a self-tape before being asked to audition at Marvel Studios' offices in Los Angeles. She had an in-person screen test in February 2020, as well as a virtual one over Zoom in June 2020, before landing the role. Set photos in November revealed that Matt Lintz had been cast in the series. The next month, Marvel confirmed that Lintz had been cast, portraying Bruno Carrelli, along with Yasmeen Fletcher as Nakia Bahadir; Zenobia Shroff as Muneeba Khan; Mohan Kapur as Yusuf Khan; Saagar Shaikh as Aamir Khan; Azhar Usman as Najaf; Aramis Knight as Kareem / Red Dagger; Rish Shah as Kamran; Travina Springer as Tyesha Hillman; Laith Nakli as Sheikh Abdullah; and Nimra Bucha as Najma.

Newcomer Laurel Marsden was cast in the role of Zoe Zimmer in February 2021, while Alysia Reiner was revealed to have also been cast in the series as Department of Damage Control (DODC) agent Sadie Deever. Fawad Khan said he was part of the cast in December 2021, appearing as Hasan, and Mehwish Hayat was reported a month later to also have a role in the series, as Aisha. In March 2022, Adaku Ononogbo was revealed to be cast as Fariha. Arian Moayed was part of the cast by that May, reprising his role as DODC agent P. Cleary from Spider-Man: No Way Home (2021), as was Farhan Akhtar in the guest role of Waleed. Samina Ahmad appears as Kamala's grandmother Sana, who was named for Amanat.

Also in February 2021, Alyy Khan revealed that he planned to be a part of the series in Obaid-Chinoy's episodes. In March 2022, Anjali Bhimani was revealed as auntie Ruby, a recurring role, after previously appearing in the Marvel Television series Runaways. Jordan Firstman appears as Gabe Wilson, named as an homage to G. Willow Wilson, while Ali Alsaleh and Dan Carter appear as Aadam and Saleem. Vardah Aziz and Asfandyar Khan appear as Kamala's cousins Zainab and Owais, respectively. Brie Larson makes an uncredited cameo appearance as Carol Danvers / Captain Marvel in the series finale's mid-credits scene.

=== Design ===
Arjun Bhasin was the costume designer for the series. Kamala's Ms. Marvel costume was inspired by burkinis and shalwar kameez, with subtle "cultural details" in the fabric. Amanat credited Bhasin for incorporating "cool textures" to make the costume feel South Asian in a subtle way, and she noted that the lightning bolt on the costume was updated from the comic version. Christopher Glass was the production designer for the series, while Natasha Gerasimova took over for the series' reshoots. Perception created the end title sequence, using footage of locations in Jersey City mixed with Ms. Marvel-related murals.

=== Filming ===
El Arbi and Fallah, Menon, and Obaid-Chinoy directed the series. Filming began in early November 2020 at Trilith Studios in Atlanta, Georgia, with additional filming at Blackhall Studios and Areu Brothers Studios. The series was filmed under the working title Jersey. Cinematographers were Robrecht Heyvaert for El Arbi and Fallah, Carmen Cabana for Menon, and Jules O'Loughlin for Obaid-Chinoy.

The animated sequences were not scripted, though an early version of the first episode's script had a moment inside Kamala's head which the directors expanded across the entire series. El Arbi and Fallah conceived them as a way to "get inside Kamala Khan's head and capture her dream world and fantasy world", and for viewers to see the world "through her eyes". These moments were a way to translate the vibrancy the directors enjoyed from the comics into the series, and were inspired by the animated film Spider-Man: Into the Spider-Verse (2018). The integration of the animated elements took a lot of planning during pre-production, so the directors could not improvise how those sequences were shot. El Arbi said the other directors enjoyed using these ideas for their episodes as well. The duo were inspired by Spike Lee to make New Jersey a character in the series like Lee does with New York City in his films, and also took inspiration from Steven Spielberg, anime (particularly for the visual effects), John Hughes's films, the films Booksmart and Scott Pilgrim vs. the World (2010), the early 1990s television series Parker Lewis Can't Lose and Saved by the Bell, and Adrian Alphona and Jamie McKelvie's art from the Ms. Marvel comics. El Arbi and Fallah concluded filming their episodes on March 5, 2021.

Cultural advisors were used to examine the scripts and footage to ensure authenticity. Secondary filming occurred in Hudson County, New Jersey, from March to early April. Vellani and Shah continued to film scenes in Atlanta through late April and early May. Obaid-Chinoy began filming the fourth and fifth episodes in Thailand by March 23, specifically in Bangkok and at the Studio Park facilities. Due to the series' strict COVID-19 protocols, Ms. Marvel was able to obtain a waiver from the Thai government to continue filming in the country throughout April and May 2021 despite new restrictions put in place in April that suspended other film and television productions. The cast and crew of 450 people were divided into three bubbles so production could continue if a positive test was found in one of the bubbles. Thailand stands in for Pakistan in the series, with the production unable to shoot in that country because of its political situation, though some pickup shots were filmed in Karachi. Principal photography concluded in Thailand in early May 2021.

Reshoots, with Obaid-Chinoy directing, occurred at the end of January 2022. She said these were mostly pickup material to help clarify story elements and make a cohesive narrative. Conversely, Gerasimova called the reshoots "pretty massive" because there was "quite a big script restructuring, and a lot of episodes were reshuffled", which resulted in the need to build new sets in Atlanta. This included trying to match with material that was shot in Thailand which Gerasimova said was "incredibly challenging". The series finale's mid-credits scene was shot by The Marvels director Nia DaCosta.

=== Post-production ===
Editors on the series include Nona Khodai (episodes one, four, five, and six), Sabrina Plisco (episodes one, three, and six), and Emma McCleave and Sushila Love (episodes two and three). Visual effects for the series were created by Digital Domain, Framestore, FuseFX, Method Studios, RISE, SSVFX, Trixter, and Perception.

=== Music ===
External audio
- Laura Karpman – Ms. Marvel Suite (From "Ms. Marvel"/Audio Only) presents composer Laura Karpman's main theme for the series, YouTube audio-only video from MarvelMusicVevo's channel

Composer Laura Karpman worked on the score for the series for five months, from February to July 2022. She previously composed for What If...? and had been hired to score The Marvels. Karpman said she immersed herself in Kamala's "rich musical heritage", and wanted to give the character "the kind of dignity and presence of every other major Marvel superhero" while acknowledging her cultural background. She worked closely with Amanat, who had specific ideas she wanted for the music of the series, while also recommending a violinist to Karpman to achieve certain "unique sounds".

Approaching Kamala's theme, Karpman looked to incorporate a traditional orchestra with South Asian musical elements, ensure that it was "hip, driven by contemporary beats, dhol beats, tabla beats, or both" since the character was a teenager. The South Asian elements were achieved by a number of artists who played the sarangi, sursringar, bansuri, and mridangam, recording remotely in India and Pakistan, alongside featured soloists, violinist Raaginder and vocalist Ganavya Doraiswamy. Karpman was impressed with the improvisation by these artists, believing those takes had "the most interesting stuff" in them over the ones with just the themes she had provided for them to play. These sounds were combined with a 70-piece orchestra that recorded every week at Synchron Stage Vienna, along with other production and processing elements; an eight-voice choir of South Asian singers added for the fifth episode score. Other themes created by Karpman included one for Kamala's bangle and one for her heritage, and a love theme for Aisha and Hasan, among others. Karpman's score was released digitally by Marvel Music and Hollywood Records in two volumes: music from the first three episodes was released on June 22, and music from the last three was released on July 13. Karpman's "Ms. Marvel Suite" was released as a single on June 7.

Ms. Marvel also features a number of existing songs, with Ali believing music was an integral part of adapting the character to the screen. She credited Amanat for having a strong vision of which songs were needed and should be used. Amanat called Ms. Marvel a "great platform" to showcase South Asian music, with the selections being a blend in a similar way to Kamala.

All music composed by Laura Karpman except where noted.

Ms. Marvel: Vol. 1 (Episodes 1–3) [Original Soundtrack]
No.	Title	Length
1.	"Ms. Marvel Suite"	4:30
2.	"Figure Out Your Life"	1:24
3.	"Mysterious Parcel"	3:30
4.	"The Plan"	2:18
5.	"Sure They Do"	2:04
6.	"Siren Call"	1:58
7.	"The Save"	5:20
8.	"Cosmic"	1:35
9.	"About Last Night"	1:30
10.	"Bathroom Confab"	1:02
11.	"Trail of Stars"	2:33
12.	"Damage Control"	1:35
13.	"Hard Landing"	3:22
14.	"Flee the Scene"	2:08
15.	"Digging in the Dirt"	3:26
16.	"Bad Things Happen"	1:48
17.	"Questioning"	0:52
18.	"Good News, Bad News"	1:13
19.	"A Thing You Do"	1:43
20.	"Circle Q Score"	1:19
21.	"Bonding"	1:39
22.	"Not Asking Anymore"	2:53
23.	"Blitz"	1:17
24.	"Showdown"	2:03
25.	"Homecoming"	2:09
Total length:		49:29

Ms. Marvel: Vol. 2 (Episodes 4–6) [Original Soundtrack]
No.	Title	Artist	Length
1.	"Karachi Station"		1:12
2.	"Arrival"		2:57
3.	"Friend or Foe"		1:52
4.	"It's Genetic"		1:41
5.	"Stove"		1:30
6.	"Two Worlds"		2:36
7.	"Getaway"		1:38
8.	"Blood and Pain"		1:11
9.	"Mother and Daughter"		2:01
10.	"Training"		1:11
11.	"Surprise"		0:52
12.	"Street Chase"		2:09
13.	"Leaping Balconies"		1:16
14.	"Running Scared"		2:05
15.	"Another Season"		1:44
16.	"Fight for Freedom"		0:44
17.	"Walking Stick"		1:11
18.	"She Who Lives"		2:33
19.	"Peaceful Transition"		1:05
20.	"Charity"		1:09
21.	"A Meeting and a Deadline"		1:45
22.	"People Are Dying"		1:23
23.	"Exodus"		1:20
24.	"The Last Train"		3:39
25.	"Answered Prayer"		4:26
26.	"Transfer"		1:46
27.	"Two People"		1:40
28.	"Reconciliation"		1:16
29.	"Generations"		0:58
30.	"Nowhere to Go"		0:45
31.	"Subway Powers"		1:14
32.	"Circle Q Exploded"		1:14
33.	"New Suit"		0:43
34.	"Raid"		0:49
35.	"Ensure Your Safety"		1:35
36.	"Keep Looking"		1:09
37.	"Glowing Pains"		1:26
38.	"Back to School"		1:44
39.	"New Plan"		1:42
40.	"Threat"		1:18
41.	"Bad Press"		1:27
42.	"Walls Close In"		1:32
43.	"Stay With Me"		1:13
44.	"What Happens in Karachi"		2:35
45.	"Powerful Hands"		2:52
46.	"There is No Normal"		2:25
47.	"Control Damaged"		1:41
48.	"On a Lamp Post"		3:19
49.	"Who...Is...That...??!!"		0:32
50.	"Bed of Roses – Indian Mix"	Tanweer Mian, Prashant Patil & Gurinder Negi	2:32
51.	"Aavegi"	Ritviz	2:31
Total length:			1:28:29

== Marketing ==
A first look at the series with early footage, testimonials about the impact the character has had, and clips of Vellani's audition was shown at Disney's Investor Day in December 2020. Josh Weiss at Syfy Wire called it "absolutely priceless" seeing the exact moment Vellani learned she had been cast as Kamala. Additional footage was shown during Disney+ Day on November 12, 2021.

The first trailer for the series was released on March 15, 2022. Many commentators noted the change to Kamala's powers from the comics (in which she has shape-shifting abilities) to being able to harness cosmic energy and form constructs with magical bangles, believed to be similar to the Nega-Bands from the comics. Linda Codega at Gizmodo said the trailer was "as adorable, fun, and exciting as the comics[, full] of absolutely excellent directorial decisions" and that the series looked like "a tone-perfect mashup of Scott Pilgrim vs. The World and Sky High". Gabrielle Sanchez of The A.V. Club said the trailer offered "an illustrative guide to Kamala Khan". The final shot of the trailer, as well as a teaser poster also released for the series, pays homage to the cover of Ms. Marvel (2014) #5.

A Fan's Guide to Ms. Marvel, a documentary short featuring an exclusive look at the production of the series and interviews from the filmmaking team and Vellani, was released on Disney+ on June 1, 2022. In January 2021, Marvel announced their "Marvel Must Haves" program, which reveals new toys, games, books, apparel, home decor, and other merchandise related to each episode of Ms. Marvel following an episode's release, which started on June 7 and concluded on July 15, 2022. QR codes were included in the first four episodes linking viewers to a website to access free digital comics featuring Ms. Marvel that updated weekly; this followed a similar program that happened with Moon Knight. The comics released for the episodes, in order, were Ms. Marvel (2014) #1, Ms. Marvel (2014) #15, Magnificent Ms. Marvel (2019) #1, Ms. Marvel (2015) #12, and Ms. Marvel (2014) #19.

== Release ==
Ms. Marvel premiered on Disney+ on June 8, 2022, and consisted of six episodes, with episodes being released weekly, concluding on July 13. The red carpet premiere occurred on June 2 at El Capitan Theatre in Los Angeles. The series was originally scheduled to debut in late 2021, but following the announcement of Hawkeye premiering in late November 2021, Aaron Couch of The Hollywood Reporter said it was "unclear" if Ms. Marvel would also still release in 2021, given Hawkeye would still be releasing into December and it was "unlikely" two Marvel Studios series would release at the same time. In August 2021, Matt Webb Mitovich of TVLine felt it was "very safe to assume" Ms. Marvel would premiere in early 2022, with it confirmed the following month to be moving to 2022. In November 2021, it was confirmed to be releasing in mid-2022, with the June 2022 premiere confirmed in March 2022. Ms. Marvel is part of Phase Four of the MCU.

The series received a three-part theatrical release across Pakistan through licenser HKC Entertainment, due to Disney+ not being available in the country at that time. The first two episodes were released on June 16, 2022, followed by the third and fourth episodes on June 30, with the last two episodes released on July 14. Ms. Marvel aired on ABC as part of The Wonderful World of Disney, with the first three episodes airing on August 5, 2023, and the final three airing on August 12, 2023. This was done in hopes of allowing an additional opportunity for viewers to see the series and be introduced to Kamala Khan before her appearance in The Marvels later in 2023, as well as to fill programming time for ABC during the 2023 Writers Guild of America and SAG-AFTRA strikes that had shut down production on television series.

== Reception ==
=== Viewership ===
Whip Media, which tracks viewership data for the more than 21 million worldwide users of its TV Time app, calculated that Ms. Marvel was the most anticipated new television series for June 2022. Variety's Trending TV chart, which tracks social media engagement across trending television content, reported that Ms. Marvel generated 526,000 engagements on Twitter from March 14–20, 2022. The surge in engagement was largely driven by the March 15 trailer drop, which introduced the character to audiences. Ms. Marvel ranked No. 2 on the chart, behind the Critics Choice Awards broadcast. Ms. Marvel later generated 344,000 engagements on Twitter from June 6–12, 2022. The show ranked No. 2 on the chart, behind Stranger Things. The show was featured in the Pakistan Google Search Trends list, ranking as one of the most-searched television series in the country in 2022.

Market research company Parrot Analytics, which looks at consumer engagement in consumer research, streaming, downloads, and on social media, reported that Ms. Marvel had 46.2 times the average series demand in its first month after premiering. It ranked behind Obi-Wan Kenobi and Star Trek: Strange New Worlds in demand for new series premieres in the second quarter of 2022. Parrot Analytics also noted steady week-to-week growth in demand throughout the series' release. Luminate, which measures streaming performance in the U.S. by analyzing viewership data, audience engagement metrics, and content reach across various platforms, reported that Ms. Marvel accounted for 4.1% of total original series viewership on Disney+ between December 31, 2021, and December 29, 2022. It was the platform's fifth most-streamed show in 2022, with 2.5 billion minutes viewed in the United States. On August 12, 2023, the series drew 910,000 viewers on ABC, earning a 0.29 rating—an increase of 3% from the previous week.

=== Critical response ===
Ms. Marvel: Critical reception by episode
Percentage of positive critics' reviews tracked by the website Rotten Tomatoes

The review aggregator website Rotten Tomatoes reported a 98% approval rating, with an average score of 8.20/10, based on 303 reviews. The website's critics consensus reads, "Ms. Marvel is a genuinely fresh addition to the MCU—both stylistically and substantively—with Iman Vellani ably powering proceedings with her super-sized charisma." Metacritic, which uses a weighted average, assigned a score of 78 out of 100 based on 23 critics, indicating "generally favorable reviews".

The first two episodes were given to critics to review the series ahead of its premiere, with Destiny Jackson at Empire feeling the series was able to balance the comedic and dramatic moments, with "witty visual gags and well-rounded, warmly funny, instantly likeable characters", adding that Ms. Marvel had "an authentic take on Pakistani-American culture; [...] the show takes admirable care in explaining the rituals and realities of life as a modern Muslim". Writing for Rolling Stone, Alan Sepinwall commented that the superhero scenes were "rarely more than functional" with a lack of energy compared to the more personal ones such as Kamala's "arguments with her parents, her and Nakia protesting the condition of the gender-segregated parts of the mosque, or her and... Kamran flirting while discussing their favorite Bollywood films". Variety's Caroline Framke felt Ms. Marvel broke through "Marvel's typical house style" with the use of animation throughout to convey Kamala's thoughts and day dreams, calling it a "tangibly kinetic magic" and likening it to the animated film Spider-Man: Into the Spider-Verse.

Vellani's portrayal of Kamala Khan received widespread praise. IGN's Emma Fraser compared her to Hailee Steinfeld as Kate Bishop in Hawkeye, with Kathryn Porter of Paste adding that Vellani "shines" in the role and that there was "no way to explain how great she is in this other than to say that she embodies the true spirit of Kamala Khan". Mohammad Zaheer at BBC Culture called Vellani "an adorable bundle of charisma" in a role "tailor-made for her", likening her to Robert Downey Jr. as Tony Stark and Emma Watson as Hermione Granger in the Harry Potter film series.

The changes to Kamala's powers from the comics was also highlighted, albeit with a mixed reception. While the new origin's more personal connection was praised, the powers themselves drew criticism: Sepinwall called these abilities "more generic" than the comics powers; Charles Pulliam-Moore at The Verge wrote that the live-action abilities "are only able to approximate the flashy aspects of what was originally a nuanced metaphor in the comics. [...] But the show doesn't go nearly as far with its hero in terms of using its conceit to explore ideas like internalized racism or the pressures Western (read: white) beauty standards put on people of color"; and Porter pointed out that G. Willow Wilson—one of the character's creators—had previously described that during the development of Kamala's powers, it was chosen not to give her "sparkly, hand wave-y, floaty, pretty powers", which Porter felt was "one of the most important things about her in the comics, and losing that in favor of powers that are, in fact, sparkly, hand wave-y, floaty, and pretty is really unfortunate".

Activist Malala Yousafzai praised the series for its reflection of Pakistani people, and was "struck by how familiar Kamala Khan's life seemed to me", saying the series was "for every young person finding their place in the world". The series was anticipated by Muslims in Jersey City, New Jersey, with councilman Yousef Saleh calling Ms. Marvel a "critical point in TV culture" since it would feature Muslims portrayed as heroes rather than villains as is more commonly done, and he was excited about the presence of a Muslim Marvel superhero to "inspire the next generation". McNair Academic High School in the city features a club called Coles Kamala Korps, which was launched in 2022 in response to anticipation for the series and The Marvels, after informally focusing on the character previously.

After the release of the first episode, the series was review bombed on IMDb with a high number of 1 star ratings. Multiple reviews were also posted with some reviewers expressing distaste for the family friendly aspects of the series or the change of Kamala's powers, while others called the series "woke", mentioning Captain Marvel.

=== Accolades ===
Accolades received by Ms. Marvel
Award	Date of ceremony	Category	Recipient	Result	Ref.
Harvey Awards	October 7, 2022	Best Adaptation from a Comic Book/Graphic Novel	Ms. Marvel	Won	
Saturn Awards	October 25, 2022	Best Limited Event Series (Streaming)	Ms. Marvel	Nominated	
Saturn Awards	October 25, 2022	Best Performance by a Younger Actor (Streaming)	Iman Vellani	Won	
Kids' Choice Awards	March 4, 2023	Favorite TV Show (Kids)	Ms. Marvel	Nominated	
Guild of Music Supervisors Awards	March 5, 2023	Best Music Supervision – Television Drama	Ms. Marvel	Nominated	
Critics' Choice Super Awards	March 16, 2023	Best Superhero Series, Limited Series or Made-For-TV Movie	Ms. Marvel	Nominated	
Critics' Choice Super Awards	March 16, 2023	Best Actress in a Superhero Series	Iman Vellani	Nominated	
TCA Awards	August 7, 2023	Outstanding Achievement in Family Programming	Ms. Marvel	Won	
Primetime Creative Arts Emmy Awards	January 6–7, 2024	Outstanding Picture Editing For A Limited Or Anthology Series Or Movie	Nona Khodai, Sabrina Plisco (for "Generation Why")	Nominated	
Primetime Creative Arts Emmy Awards	January 6–7, 2024	Outstanding Music Composition For A Limited Or Anthology Series, Movie Or Special (Original Dramatic Score)	Laura Karpman (for "Time and Again")	Nominated	
Primetime Creative Arts Emmy Awards	January 6–7, 2024	Outstanding Original Main Title Theme Music	Laura Karpman	Nominated	
Primetime Creative Arts Emmy Awards	January 6–7, 2024	Outstanding Motion Design	Ian Spendloff, David Lochhead, Daniella Marsh, David Stumpf, Philip Robinson, and Matthew Thomas	Won	
Astra TV Awards	January 8, 2024	Best Streaming Limited Series	Ms. Marvel	Nominated	
Astra TV Awards	January 8, 2024	Best Actress in a Limited Series or Streaming Movie	Iman Vellani	Nominated	
Astra TV Awards	January 8, 2024	Best Supporting Actress in a Limited Series or Streaming Movie	Anjali Bhimani	Nominated	

== Documentary special ==
In February 2021, the documentary series Marvel Studios: Assembled was announced. The specials go behind the scenes of the making of the MCU films and television series with cast members and additional creatives. The special of this series, "The Making of Ms. Marvel", featuring Vellani, was released on Disney+ on August 3, 2022.

== Future ==
During the series' official announcement at D23, Feige stated that after introducing Ms. Marvel in the series, the character would cross over to the MCU films, which he reiterated in November 2019. Previously, Captain Marvel star Brie Larson expressed interest in including Ms. Marvel in that film's sequel, and Vellani was confirmed to be appearing in the Captain Marvel sequel, The Marvels, in December 2020. In February 2021, Feige stated that Ms. Marvel would set up the events of The Marvels. The film was not fully conceived by the time Ali started working on the series, so she had a lot of creative freedom in crafting the series but knew there needed to be a "maturity" across Kamala's character arc so she would be ready for the events of The Marvels. Shaikh, Shroff, and Kapur reprise their roles as Kamala's family members in The Marvels.

In September 2023, Ali and El Arbi said a decision regarding a potential second season would be made following the release of The Marvels. In December 2023, Vellani expressed interest in having Doc.X serve as the villain in a second season, since it would "resonate with the Gen Z audience", and was also hopeful her and Pirzada's Ms. Marvel comic books, which retconned the character as a mutant in the main Marvel Comics continuity, would eventually be adapted within the MCU.
