= Alfie Fuller =

American actress

- Fuller in 2026
- Education: The New School (MFA)
- Years active: 2018–present
- Awards: Obie Award (2018)

Alfie Fuller is an American actress. In 2018, she starred in the World Premiere of Aleshea Harris's Is God Is at Soho Rep, Off-Broadway. For her performance, Fuller won the Obie Award for Distinguished Performance by an Actress, and was nominated for the Drama League Award for Distinguished Performance.

On television, Fuller is best known for her portrayal of Dinah Rutledge on the Amazon Prime Video comedy series The Marvelous Mrs. Maisel (2022-2023). She also starred as Prairie on the Hulu comedy series Deli Boys (2025-2026).

== Early life and education ==
Fuller obtained a Master of Fine Arts from the New School for Drama.

== Career ==
In 2018, Fuller made her Off-Broadway debut as Anaia in the World Premiere Aleshea Harris's Is God Is at Soho Rep. Her performance drew critical acclaim, earning her the Obie Award for Distinguished Performance by an Actress, as well as a nomination for the Drama League Award for Distinguished Performance. Later that year, she appeared in James Anthony Tyler's Artney Jackson and Jen Silverman's Dangerous House, both at the Williamstown Theatre Festival.

In 2019 she appeared in Aziza Barnes' BLKS at MCC Theater, Beth Henley's Lightning (Or The Unbuttoning) at New York Stage and Film, and William Shakespeare's Measure for Measure at The Public Theater. The latter production, produced as part of the Mobile Unit, included a cast composed entirely of women of color. In 2021, she starred as Angel Allen in Pearl Cleage's Blues for an Alabama Sky at Keen Company for which she received an AUDELCO Award nomination. In 2021, she appeared as Peaseblossom in Douglas Carter Beane's Fairycakes at Greenwich House Theater.

Fuller's made her television debut in the 2020 Apple TV anthology series Little America. She gained wider prominence as the recurring character Dinah on Marvelous Mrs. Maisel beginning in season four. She was promoted to a main cast member for season five. She was also the lead character of Prairie, a shaman and afrofuturist hipster, on the Hulu comedy series Deli Boys (2025). Fuller made her feature film debut as Trish in Shatara Michelle Ford's 2024 drama Dreams in Nightmares.

== Credits ==
=== Film ===
Year	Title	Role	Notes	Ref.
2024	Dreams in Nightmares	Trish		

=== Television ===
Year	Title	Role	Notes	Ref.
2020	Little America	Lianna	Episode: "The Rock"	
2020	Platonic	Isabel	2 episodes	
2022-2023	The Marvelous Mrs. Maisel	Dinah Rutledge	Recurring (season 4); Main role (season 5); 12 episodes	
2025-2026	Deli Boys	Prairie	Main role 16 episodes	

=== Theatre ===
Year	Title	Role	Playwright	Venue	Ref.
2018	Is God Is	Anaia	Aleshea Harris	Soho Rep, Off-Broadway	
2018	Artney Jackson	Rhonda Simpson	James Anthony Tyler	Williamstown Theatre Festival	
2018	Dangerous House	Noxolo	Jen Silverman	Williamstown Theatre Festival	
2019	BLKS	Imani	Aziza Barnes	MCC Theater, Off-Broadway	
2019	Lightning (Or The Unbuttoning)	Net Marsh	Beth Henley	New York Stage and Film	
2019	Measure for Measure	Pompey	William Shakespeare	The Public Theater, Off-Broadway	
2020	Blues for an Alabama Sky	Angel Allen	Pearl Cleage	Keen Company, Off-Broadway	
2021	Fairycakes	Peaseblossom	Douglas Carter Beane	Greenwich House Theater, Off-Broadway	

== Awards and nominations ==
Year	Associations	Category	Work	Result	Ref.
2018	Obie Award	Distinguished Performance by an Actress	Is God Is	Won	
2018	Drama League Award	Distinguished Performance	Is God Is	Nominated	
2020	Audelco Award	Outstanding Lead Actress	Blues for an Alabama Sky	Nominated	
