= Entochus =

Ancient Greek sculpto

Entochus was an Ancient Greek sculptor. His statues of Oceanus and Jupiter were in the collection of Asinius Pollio.
