= Aziza Barnes =

American poet, screenwriter and playwright (1992–2024)

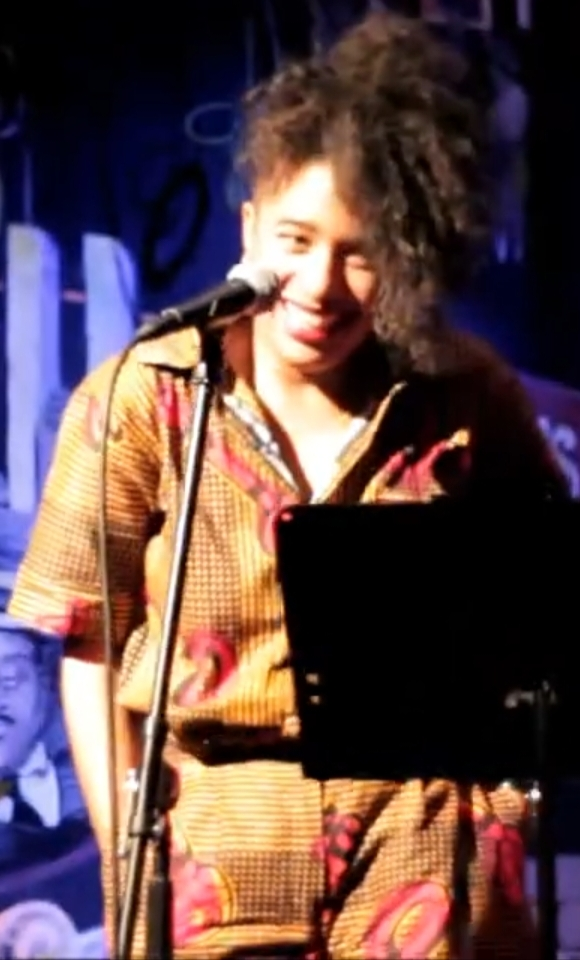
- Barnes in 2013
- Born: Aziza Danielle Bailey Barnes; October 8, 1992; Los Angeles, California, U.S.
- Died: December 15, 2024 (aged 32)
- Education: New York University (BFA); University of Mississippi (MFA)
- Occupations: Poet; screenwriter; playwright
- Notable work: BLKS
- Title: Fellow, Cave Canem Foundation

Aziza Danielle Bailey Barnes (October 8, 1992 – December 15, 2024) was an American poet, screenwriter and playwright. Barnes frequently performed slam poetry and performed at the Da Poetry Lounge, Urban Word NYC, PBS News Hour and Nuyoricans Poets Café. They wrote for television shows, including Snowfall and Teenage Bounty Hunters.

== Early life and education ==
Barnes was born in Los Angeles in October 1992 to Craig Barnes and Marchelle Bailey. Aziza had a younger sister and an older brother. They went to undergrad at the New York University Tisch School of the Arts. They received their MFA from the University of Mississippi.

== Career ==
A performer, Barnes was a member of the Divine Fabrics Collective, alongside fellow writers Safia Elhillo, Camonghne Felix, and Sean "Mega" DesVignes. Barnes was the author of the chapbook me Aunt Jemima and the nailgun (2013), which became the first book to ever win a prize from Button Poetry. Their full-length collection, i be but i ain’t (2016), won a Pamet River Prize from YesYes Books. They were the co-founder of the Poetry Gods podcast and the co-founder of The Conversation Literary Festival. Barnes wrote the play BLKS, which was played at Steppenwolf Theatre Company in Chicago. Their debut novel, The Blind Pig, was published by Not A Cult on October 14, 2019. Barnes wrote the play Pues Nada (2020). Barnes also wrote for MEL.

=== BLKS ===
BLKS is the story of four black millennial friends, Octavia, June, Ry and Imani, who share a New York City apartment. The story is a "day in the life" style of work and was called "comedic social realism". The production was compared to the drama series Girls. BLKS was originally Barnes' final thesis project at NYU.

Actresses Nora Carroll, Leea Ayers, Danielle Davis and Celeste M. Cooper performed in the Steppenwolf Theatre Company rendition of BLKS. The show was directed by Nataki Garrett. The show debuted on December 18, 2017, and ran through January 28, 2018.

BLKS won the 2020 Antonyo Award in the Best Play category. Barnes was nominated for the Lucille Lortel Award for the play that same year.

Barnes made their acting debut in June 2024 with their play FKA I Am a Bad Blk Person, which is a sequel to BLKS.

=== Television ===
Barnes wrote for the series Snowfall, Teenage Bounty Hunters, Rap Sh!t, and the Game of Thrones prequel A Knight of the Seven Kingdoms. At the time of their death, Barnes was working on an HBO adaptation of the novel The Vanishing Half.

== Personal life and death ==
Barnes was black and identified as queer. They were from Los Angeles and lived in Oxford, Mississippi. They also lived in Bedford–Stuyvesant. Barnes used they/them pronouns.

Barnes died by suicide on December 15, 2024, at the age of 32.

== Bibliography ==
- Barnes, Aziza (January 1, 2013). me Aunt Jemima and the nailgun. Exploding Pinecone Press. Button Poetry. ISBN 978-09896415-0-0. Published as an e-book by Button Poetry. (January 4, 2020. ASIN B01MZC3LXJ, ISBN 978-1-943735-02-0.)
- Barnes, Aziza (June 1, 2016). i be, but i ain't. Portland, Oregon: YesYes Books. ISBN 1936919397, 978-1936919390. OCLC 953984258.
- Barnes, Aziza (October 14, 2019). The Blind Pig. Not a Cult (First ed.). ISBN 1945649321, 978-1945649325. ASIN 1945649321. EAN 9781945649325.
- Barnes, Aziza (January 1, 2020). BLKS. Dramatists Play Service. ISBN 0822240696, 978-0822240693. ASIN 0822240696.
- Barnes, Aziza. The Blind Pig (Dog-eared Edition). Not a Cult.

== Awards and fellowships ==
- 2015 Winter Tangerine Award
- 2013 NYU Grey Art Gallery Prize for Radical Presence
- Emerging Poets Fellowship at Poets House
- Cave Canem Foundation Fellow
- Callaloo Fellow
