= Special Forces Association =

Fraternal organization

The Special Forces Association (SFA) is a non-profit fraternal organization for current and retired U.S. Army Special Forces soldiers, also known as "Green Berets." Established in 1964, the association is based at Fort Bragg, North Carolina, with 84 chapters located in the United States as well as Panama, South Korea, Germany, Thailand, Philippines and Okinawa. Chapters meet in their respective areas and conduct meetings, hold reunions and host social functions for their members.

Membership is open to any person who is or has been a member of Special Forces, including those in the U.S. Army Reserve and Army National Guard. Those wishing to join must apply, providing certified documentation proving past or current assignment with a special forces unit. Associate membership is also available to individuals who do not meet this criterion, but who have "contributed significantly to the support of Special Forces, or its lineage, in the accomplishment of its mission."

The Association publishes The Drop, a quarterly magazine providing news and information about its members, and sponsors an annual convention.

== Notable members ==
- LTG William P. Yarborough, commander of the US Army Special Warfare Center/School for Special Warfare and "Father of the Modern Green Berets"
- MG John K. Singlaub, OSS/Jedburgh in WW II, MACV-SOG Commander in Vietnam
- COL Aaron Bank, founder and first commanding officer of U.S. Army's first Special Forces unit
- LTC William Francis Buckley, US Army officer and CIA officer
- COL Roger Donlon, Medal of Honor recipient
- SSG Franklin D. Miller, Medal of Honor recipient
- Robin Moore, author of The Green Berets
- MAJ John Plaster, veteran of MACV-SOG and author of The Ultimate Sniper
- Martha Raye, entertainer and honorary "Green Beret"
- SFC Randall Shughart, Medal of Honor recipient
- SGM Billy Waugh, former US Army NCO and CIA officer
- SFC Jesse "DOC" Gonzales Look Magazine,

== Chapters ==
Name	Location
Chapter 1–18	Fayetteville, North Carolina
Rising Sun Chapter 2	Okinawa, Japan
Chapter 3	Bangkok, Thailand
Charles Hosking/Al Fontes, Rocky Mountain Chapter 4–24	Colorado Springs, Colorado
Wheeler James Chapter 6	Charlotte, North Carolina
South of the Border Chapter 7	Crestview, Florida
Jimmy Dean Chapter 10	Sierra Vista, Arizona
Chapter 11	Alexandria, Virginia
Gen. Robert C. Kingston Chapter 13	Republic of Korea
Steve King VP Chapter XIV	Monterey, California
The Alamo Chapter 15	San Antonio, Texas
William R. Card Memorial Chapter 16	Fort Lewis, Washington
SSG Kenneth Worthley Memorial Chapter 20	Minneapolis-St. Paul, Minnesota
Chapter 22	Chandler, Arizona
Golden Gate Chapter 23	San Francisco
Gunpowder Chapter 26	Baltimore, Maryland
Martha Raye Chapter 27	St. Louis, Missouri
Col. Arthur "Bull" Simons Memorial Chapter 29	Kansas City, Missouri
A.J. "Bo" Baker Memorial Chapter 30	Kenner, Louisiana
Billy M. Smith Chapter 31	Dallas, Texas
Chapter 32	Lawton, Oklahoma
Larry A. Thorne Memorial Chapter 33	Cleveland, Tennessee
Maj. Gen. Michael D. Healy Chapter 37	Chicago, Illinois
Chapter 38	Fort Campbell, Kentucky
Chapter 39	Houston, Texas
CSM Paul M. Darcy Memorial Chapter 40	Clearwater, Florida
Col. Nick Rowe Memorial Chapter 46	Barrigada, Guam
Chapter 48	Providence, Rhode Island
Chapter 50	Tulsa, Oklahoma
George Morton/Harry Munck Chapter 51	Las Vegas, Nevada
Lt. Col. William F. Buckley Memorial Chapter 54	Boston, Massachusetts
Michael F. May Memorial Chapter 55	Richmond, Michigan
Chapter 56	Albuquerque, NM
Joe Alderman Memorial Chapter 59	Atlanta, Georgia
Richard J. Meadows Memorial Chapter 60	MacDill AFB, Florida
Chapter 61	Manlius, New York
SFC Randall Shughart Memorial Chapter 64	Carlisle, Pennsylvania
SSG William A. Will Memorial Chapter 67	Johnstown, Pennsylvania
John J. Kedenburg Memorial Chapter 66	New York City
Great Lakes Chapter 73	Wisconsin
Cpt. Robert M. May Memorial Chapter 74	Winter Park, Florida
Roger H. Donlon Chapter 75	San Diego
Chapter 77	Killeen, Texas
Lt. Col. Frank J. Dallas Chapter 78	Santa Ana, California
Rocky Versace, Ozarks Chapter 82	Branson, Missouri
The Treasure Coast Chapter 85	Stuart, Florida
Green Berets of North East Florida, Chapter 88	Jacksonville, Florida
Allen C. Johnson Memorial Chapter 89	Reno, Nevada
Richard L. Ferguson Memorial Chapter 90	Fredericksburg, Virginia
Chapter 100	Fort Bragg, North Carolina

|Chapter 102 SGM Billy Waugh Chapter |CSSRA Georgia South Carolina |}
