= Sean Mullin =

American film director

- Born: January 13, 1975 (age 51); Indianapolis, Indiana
- Education: United States Military Academy; Columbia University
- Occupations: Film director, screenwriter, film producer

Sean Mullin (born January 13, 1975) is an American film director, screenwriter and film producer.

== Early life ==
Originally from Indiana, Mullin moved to Boca Raton, Florida, when he was eight. He graduated from Spanish River Community High School before attending The United States Military Academy at West Point, where he was a four-year member of the Army Rugby Football Club.

Upon graduation from West Point, Mullin served on active duty as an army officer in Germany. He finished his service commitment as a captain in the New York Army National Guard in Manhattan, where he worked as the Officer in Charge of the soldiers stationed at Ground Zero as a first responder to the attacks of September 11, 2001.

While living in New York City, Mullin performed stand-up comedy regularly and studied improv at New York's Upright Citizens Brigade Theater.

After leaving the military in 2002, Mullin earned an MFA in film directing from Columbia University.

== Career ==
While in graduate school, Mullin wrote and directed three short films -- Sadiq, Man is a Bridge, and The 14th Morning—all of which played at film festivals and won various awards. His MFA thesis film -- Sadiq (starring Laith Nakli, Zach McGowan, and Danny Bruckert) -- was a finalist for the "Student Filmmaker Award" at the 2006 MTV Movie Awards.

In 2012, he produced the feature film Allegiance, written and directed by Michael Connors, and starring Seth Gabel, Pablo Schreiber, Bow Wow, Corey Hawkins, Malik Yoba and Aidan Quinn.

In 2014, his debut feature film as a writer/director -- Amira & Sam—had its world premiere at the Seattle International Film Festival, where it received positive reviews from a variety of sources, including The Hollywood Reporter. Amira & Sam went on to win several major awards at numerous film festivals and was purchased by Drafthouse Films, who released the film theatrically in 2015. The film stars Martin Starr, Dina Shihabi, Paul Wesley, Laith Nakli, Ross Marquand, and David Rasche.

Amira & Sam was named "One of the 10 Best Romantic Comedies of the Decade" by Slashfilm.

Mullin is the co-writer/co-producer of Semper Fi, which was released theatrically by Lionsgate Films in 2019. Semper Fi was co-written/directed by Academy Award nominee, Henry-Alex Rubin, and produced by Academy Award nominee, David Lancaster. The film stars Jai Courtney, Nat Wolff, Finn Wittrock, Arturo Castro, Beau Knapp, and Leighton Meester.

Mullin is the writer/director of the feature-length documentary It Ain't Over about baseball legend, Yogi Berra. The film was made with the support of the Berra family and it features interviews with Joe Torre, Derek Jeter, Don Mattingly, Mariano Rivera, Joe Girardi, Ron Guidry, Willie Randolph, Bobby Richardson, Tony Kubek, Hector Lopez, Al Downing, Joe Maddon, Bob Costas, Billy Crystal, and Vin Scully. It premiered at the 2022 Tribeca Film Festival and was released theatrically by Sony Pictures Classics in 2023. It has been met with widespread acclaim on Rotten Tomatoes—scoring 98% with critics and 96% with audiences.

Mullin produced the feature film Bob Trevino Likes It, which won over two dozen film festivals around the world—including the Jury Award and the Audience Award at the 2024 SXSW Film Festival. The film was distributed theatrically by Roadside Attractions and stars Barbie Ferreira, John Leguizamo, French Stewart, Rachel Bay Jones and Lauren "Lolo" Spencer.

== Filmography ==
Year	Film	Category	Role
2004	The 14th Morning	Short Film	Director, Producer, Writer
2005	Man is a Bridge	Short Film	Director, Producer, Writer
2006	Sadiq	Short Film	Director, Producer, Writer
2012	Allegiance	Feature Film	Producer
2014	Amira & Sam	Feature Film	Director, Co-Producer, Writer
2019	Kings of Beer	Documentary	Director, Producer, Writer
2019	Semper Fi	Feature Film	Co-Producer, Writer
2022	It Ain't Over	Documentary	Director, Co-Producer, Writer
2024	Bob Trevino Likes It	Feature Film	Producer
