= Lovat Scouts =

British Army unit (1900–1969)

- Cap badge of the Lovat Scouts
- Active: 1900–1969
- Country: United Kingdom
- Branch: British Army
- Type: Yeomanry
- Size: 1900s: Two battalions World War I: Six regiments World War II: Two battalions
- Motto: Je suis prest (I am ready)
- Battle honours: South Africa 1900–02; Gallipoli 1915; Egypt 1915–16; Macedonia 1916–18; France and Flanders 1916–18

Commanders
- Notable commanders: Simon Fraser, 14th Lord Lovat; Simon Fraser, 15th Lord Lovat; Donald Cameron of Lochiel

The Lovat Scouts was a British Army unit first formed during the Second Boer War as a Scottish Highland yeomanry regiment. They were the first known military unit to wear a ghillie suit, and were renowned for their elite reconnaissance capabilities. In 1916, the Lovat Scouts formally became the British Army's first sniper unit, then known as "sharpshooters". The regiment served in the First World War and Second World War.

== History ==
=== Formation and early history ===
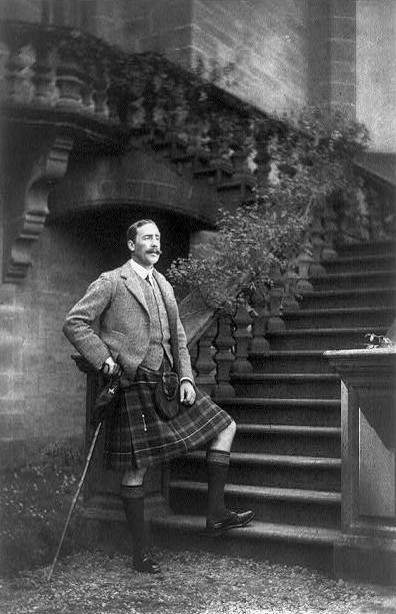
Simon Fraser, 14th Lord Lovat

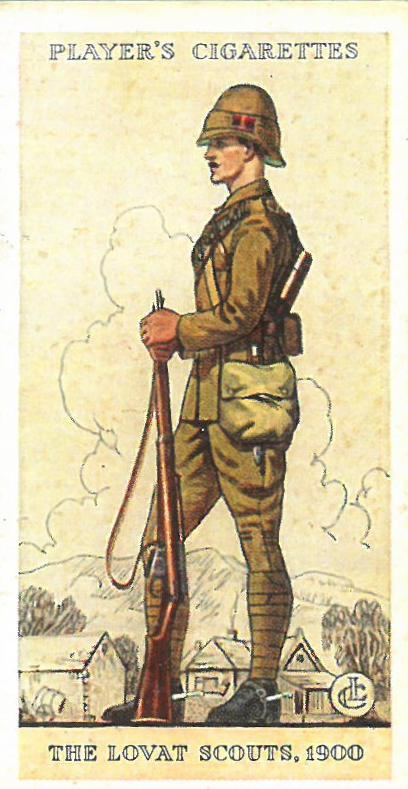
The Lovat Scouts, 1900, Player's Cigarette Card

The regiment was formed in January 1900 for service in the Second Boer War by Simon Fraser, 14th Lord Lovat, Chief of Clan Fraser of Lovat, as the Lovat Scouts. Recruited initially from gamekeepers and professional stalkers on Highland estates, the unit was commanded by the Hon. Andrew David Murray from his appointment by Lord Lovat in February 1900 until killed in action September 1901. After his death Lord Lovat, who had hitherto served as second-in-command of the regiment, took command himself (aged 29), and in such a role he remained till the end of the war. Well practiced in the arts of marksmanship, fieldcraft and military tactics, they were also phenomenal woodsmen "always ready to tempt fate", but also practitioners of discretion: "He who shoots and runs away, lives to shoot another day." The Lovat Scouts have the distinction of being the first military unit to wear a Ghillie suit.

Lovat Scouts were attached to the Black Watch, but were disbanded in July 1901 while two companies (the 113th and 114th) were formed for the second contingent of the Imperial Yeomanry (IY) and another (178th) for the third contingent. After the end of the Second Boer War in June 1902, the companies returned to the United Kingdom on SS Tintagel Castle two months later, and were disbanded. The unit was reformed the following year, consisting of two battalions, titled the 1st and 2nd Lovat Scouts. From these Scouts a sharpshooter unit was formed and formally become the British Army's first sniper unit. The regiment was disbanded in August 1902 but reformed as Lovat's Scouts Imperial Yeomanry in February 1903. It reverted to the Lovat's Scouts Yeomanry when the yeomanry regiments transferred to the Territorial Force in April 1908. The regiment was based at Croyard Road near Beauly at this time (since demolished).

=== First World War ===
In accordance with the Territorial and Reserve Forces Act 1907 (7 Edw. 7, c.9) which brought the Territorial Force into being, the TF was intended to be a home defence force for service during wartime and members could not be compelled to serve outside the country. However, on the outbreak of war on 4 August 1914, many members volunteered for Imperial Service. Therefore, TF units were split in August and September 1914 into 1st Line (liable for overseas service) and 2nd Line (home service for those unable or unwilling to serve overseas) units. Later, a 3rd Line was formed to act as a reserve, providing trained replacements for the 1st and 2nd Line regiments.

==== 1/1st and 1/2nd Lovat Scouts ====
The 1/1st Lovat's Scouts Yeomanry landed in Gallipoli in September 1915. It was evacuated to Egypt in December 1915 and then converted into 10th (Lovat's Scouts) Battalion, the Queen's Own Cameron Highlanders in September 1916. It landed at Salonika and under the command of 82nd Brigade in the 27th Division in October 1916 and then became Line of Communication troops in France in June 1918.

==== 2/1st and 2/2nd Lovat Scouts ====
The 2nd Line regiments were formed in 1914 and in January 1915 joined the 2/1st Highland Mounted Brigade. On 31 March 1916, the remaining Mounted Brigades were ordered to be numbered in a single sequence; the brigade became the 1st Mounted Brigade and joined 1st Mounted Division in Norfolk.

In July 1916, the 1st Mounted Division was reorganised as the 1st Cyclist Division and the regiments were converted to cyclist units in the 1st Cyclist Brigade of the division at Somerleyton near Lowestoft. In November 1916, the 1st Cyclist Division was broken up and the regiments were merged to form 1st (Lovat's Scouts) Yeomanry Cyclist Regiment, still in the 1st Cyclist Brigade. In March 1917, they resumed their identities as 2/1st Lovat's Scouts and 2/2nd Lovat's Scouts at Gorleston. By July 1917, the regiments had moved to Beccles, where they remained until the end of the war, still in 1st Cyclist Brigade.

==== 3/1st and 3/2nd Lovat Scouts ====
The 3rd Line regiments were raised in July 1915 at Beauly and affiliated to a Reserve Cavalry Regiment at Aldershot. They provided drafts to 1st and 2nd Line regiments. In June 1916, they moved to Perth. The regiments were disbanded in January 1917 with personnel transferring to the 2nd Line units or to the 3rd (Reserve) Battalion of the Queen's Own Cameron Highlanders at Invergordon.

==== "Sharpshooters" ====
In 1916, the regiment formed detachments known as "sharpshooters", which were used for observation and sniping work on the Western Front.

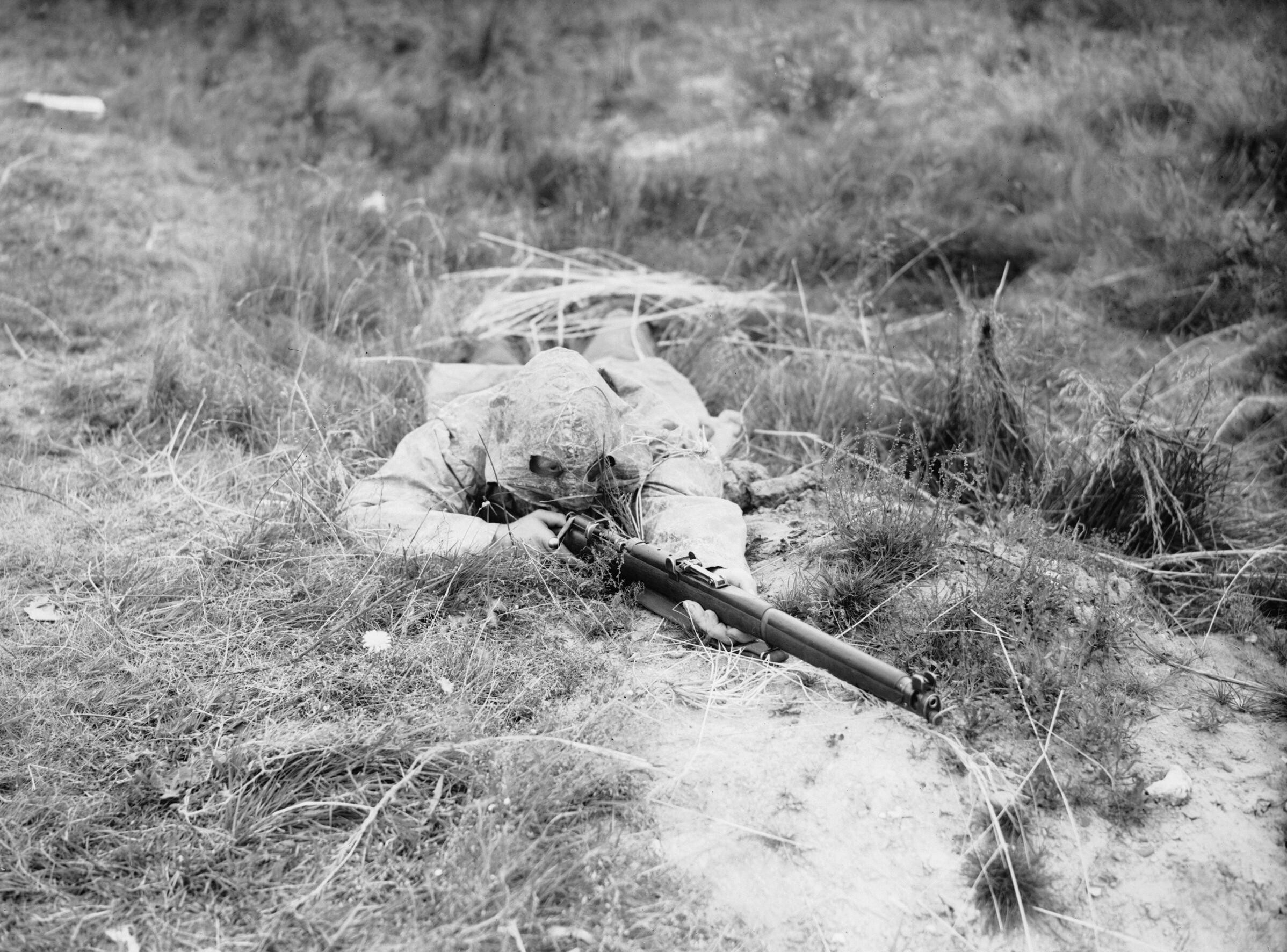
Lovat Scout sniper training

=== Between the wars ===
Post-war, a commission was set up to consider the shape of the Territorial Force from 1 October 1921. The experience of the First World War made it clear that there was a surplus of cavalry. The commission decided that only the 14 most senior regiments were to be retained as cavalry, the others being variously converted to armoured cars or artillery. However, two Scottish Yeomanry regiments remained mounted as 'Scouts': the Scottish Horse and the Lovat Scouts (reduced to a single battalion).

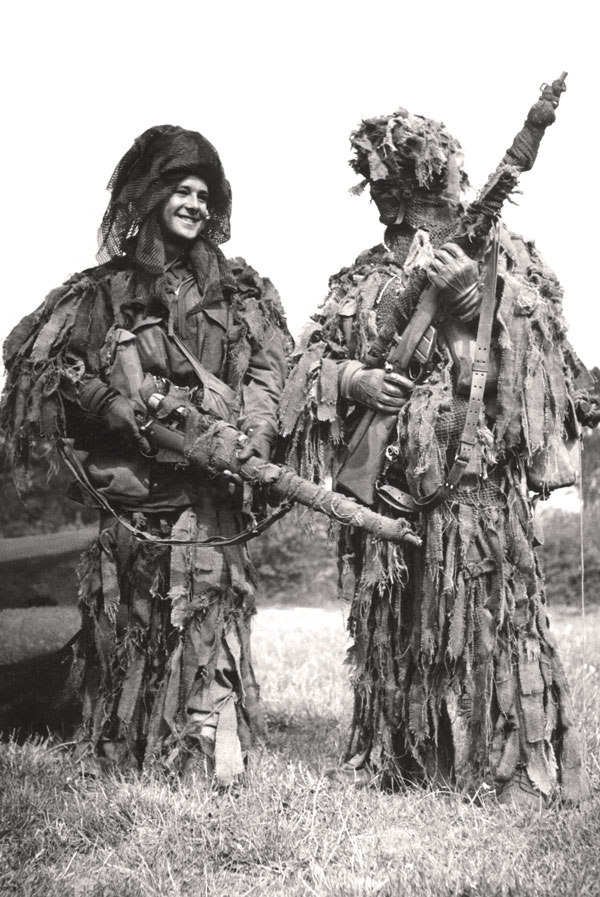
Lovat Scouts in ghillie suits

=== Second World War ===
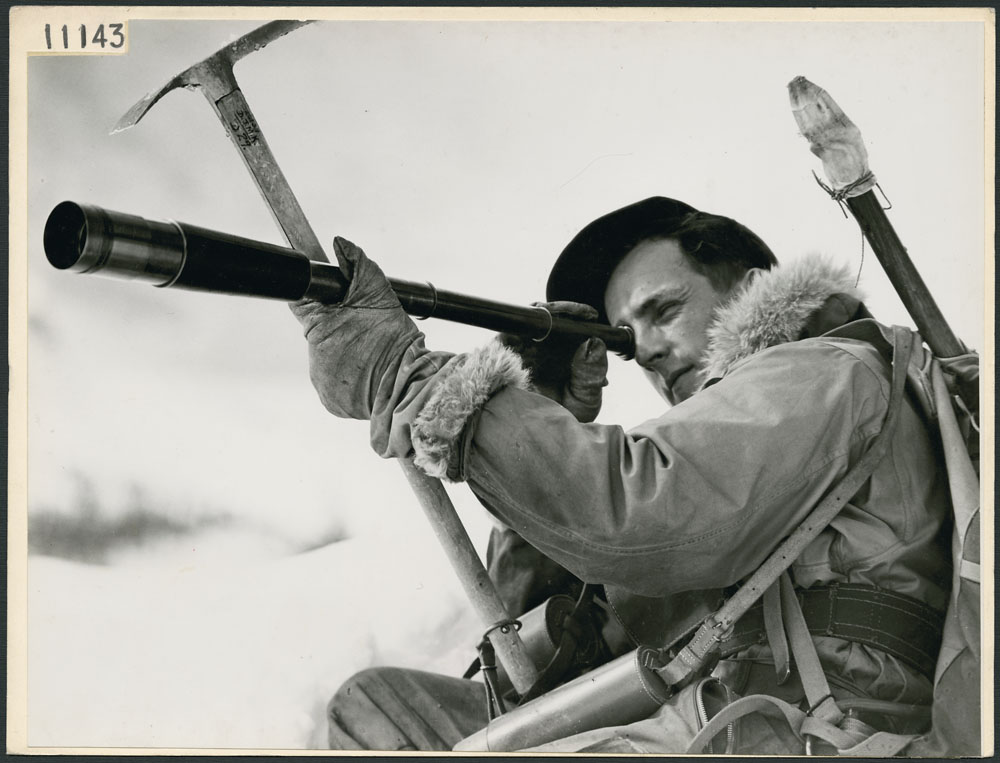
Canadian mountaineer and guide William Blacklaw helped train the Lovat Scouts during their mountain training

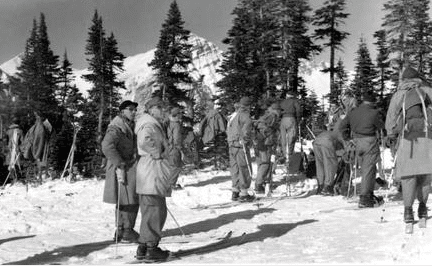
Lovat Scouts ski training in Alberta, Canada

From May 1940 to June 1942, the Lovat Scouts provided the garrison in the Faroe Islands, protecting against the feared German invasion. The regiment at this time was under the command of Lt.-Col. Sir Donald Cameron of Lochiel, 26th Chief of Clan Cameron. After stationing in Scotland, the regiment was sent to Canada in December 1943 for specialist ski and mountain training. They sailed on the Mauretania for 11 days. They pulled into Grand Central Station, New York and then travelled on the Canadian Pacific Railway eventually arriving in Jasper, Alberta after five days. The training, which took place in remote areas of Jasper National Park, started with basic ski training. The emphasis was on cross country work with the type of load that would have to be carried in action e.g. sleeping bag, rations for two or more days, and a rifle. This was followed by survival instruction—what to do and what not to do to exist and function in very cold conditions e.g. by digging snow holes in which to sleep, or erecting simple shelters from the virgin pine and spruce forests. After this stage, there was instruction and practice in ascents on snow and ice, use of ice axe, crampons etc.

Typically, men would spend three or four weeks at a mountain base, in the vicinity of Mount Edith Cavell, or in the Tonquin Valley—all within the 4200 square miles of Jasper National Park. In that time, squadrons would practice their survival work in expeditions usually lasting about two or three days at a time, with the men sleeping in snow holes. For the remainder of the time, they were billeted in canvas marquees, each accommodating about 25 men, with a large wood-burning stove in the middle that was kept on night and day with logs sawn from the fallen or naturally dead trees in the area. At the end of the three or four weeks on Mount Edith Cavell or in the Tonquin Valley, the men would come down for a few days' rest and recreation in the chalets in Jasper. Alberta was then a "dry" province, so there was no alcohol. When a few days' leave was given, most made the 500-mile journey to Vancouver or Halifax, Nova Scotia or Windsor, Ontario, where they were entertained by the locals, many of whom were Scotch expatriates or descendants. The men were also able to get limitless supplies of liquor from over the U.S. border in Montana.

By late April, spring was well on the way, and the regiment embarked by train for a journey to Halifax. Their intended embarkation there was delayed when some fell ill with scarlet fever, but training continued with work on river crossing, whether or not the individual soldiers could swim, and route marches. Eventually, all embarked on the converted liner Andes on convoy, which had an uneventful crossing, being in mid-Atlantic on 6 June, the day of the Normandy landings. On landing at Liverpool, the regiment entrained for Aberdeen Kittybrewster railway station, where it spent about three weeks, including spells of home leave.

As a consequence of its training in Jasper, the Scouts was sent to Italy, arriving in Naples in July 1944, to take their part in the relatively fluid situation following the fall of Monte Cassino. The regiment took part in the remainder of the Italian campaign, and the German surrender in early May 1945.

=== Post-War ===
At the end of the war in Europe, the regiment drove north, through the Brenner Pass, into Austria and Bavaria, where they sought out senior members of the Nazi party and SS personnel. In early 1946, the regiment moved to Greece by plane, landing in Salonika in support of the Greek Civil Power during the communist insurgency.

Upon the reconstitution of the Territorial Army on 1 January 1947, the regiment was reduced to a squadron (C (Lovat Scouts) Squadron) of The Scottish Horse, part of the Royal Armoured Corps. However, on 1 January 1949 it was transferred to the Royal Artillery as 677 (Lovat Scouts) Mountain Regiment, RA , with headquarters at Inverness. On 22 May the following year one battery became independent as 850 (Lovat Scouts) Mountain Battery then on 30 September the rest of the regiment amalgamated with 532 Light Anti-Aircraft Regiment at Falkirk and 540 Light Anti-Aircraft Regiment at Inverness, the combined unit taking the title 532 (Lovat Scouts) Light Anti-Aircraft Regiment, RA. 850 Mountain Bty was disbanded on 5 April 1954 and the personnel absorbed back into 532 LAA Regiment, which was redesignated 540 (Lovat Scouts) LAA Regiment on 4 November that year. On 31 October 1956 it absorbed 412 (Highland) (Mixed) Coast Regiment with no change of title.

The regiment underwent further changes when the TA was reorganised on 1 May 1961:

- B Troop at Alness and Tain, and the detachment at Gare Loch, were absorbed into 11th Battalion, Seaforth Highlanders
- A Troop at Benbecula, C Troop at Newtonmore, and the detachment at Fort William, were absorbed into 4th Battalion, Queen's Own Cameron Highlanders
- The rest of 540 LAA Regiment absorbed 861 (Orkney and Zetland) Independent LAA Battery, which became Q (Orkney & Zetland) Bty at Lerwick, Shetland; it dropped 'LAA' from the regimental title on 4 October that year, and was designated 'Light Air Defence' from 18 March 1964.

When the TA was reduced into the Territorial and Army Volunteer Reserve (TAVR) after the defence cuts of 1967, the unit became A (The Lovat Scouts) Company, in 3rd (Territorial) Battalion, Queen's Own Highlanders (Seaforth and Camerons), which became part of 2nd Battalion 51st Highland Volunteers in March 1969.

The unit was re-organised as two separate platoons in two different companies of 51st Highland Volunteers in 1981 and as two separate platoons of 3rd (Volunteer) Battalion, The Highlanders (Seaforth, Gordons and Camerons) in 1995. The lineage was maintained by the Orkney Independent Cadet Battery (RA) Lovat Scouts from 2012 until 1 January 2018 when the unit amalgamated with Shetland Independent Cadet Battery (RA) forming Orkney and Shetland Battery of 1 Highlanders Battalion Army Cadet Force where they are still allowed to wear the head dress and tartan but now are a battery within 1 Highlanders ACF.

In the 2020s, a new squadron was formed within the new Scottish and North Irish Yeomanry based in Edinburgh. After forming, the squadron was designated as HQ (Lovat Scouts) Squadron.

== Music ==
The Lovat Scouts is a lively Scottish quickstep and strathspey, written in the bagpipe idiom by James Scott Skinner.

== Memorials ==
There is a memorial to the Lovat Scouts in the town square of Beauly, Inverness.

== See also ==
- Imperial Yeomanry
- List of Yeomanry Regiments 1908
- Yeomanry
- Yeomanry order of precedence
- British yeomanry during the First World War
- Second line yeomanry regiments of the British Army
- Queen's Own Cameron Highlanders
- Commandos (United Kingdom)

== Bibliography ==
- Fairrie, Lt. Col. Angus (1998). Queen's Own Highlanders (Seaforth and Camerons): An Illustrated History. QOHLDRS Amalgamation Trustees. ISBN 0-9508986-2-7.
- J.B.M. Frederick, Lineage Book of British Land Forces 1660–1978, Vol I, Wakefield: Microform Academic, 1984, ISBN 1-85117-007-3.
- J.B.M. Frederick, Lineage Book of British Land Forces 1660–1978, Vol II, Wakefield: Microform Academic, 1984, ISBN 1-85117-009-X.
- James, Brigadier E.A. (1978). British Regiments 1914–18. London: Samson Books Limited. ISBN 0-906304-03-2.
- Norman E.H. Litchfield, The Territorial Artillery 1908–1988 (Their Lineage, Uniforms and Badges), Nottingham: Sherwood Press, 1992, ISBN 0-9508205-2-0.
- Melvile, Major Michael Leslie (1981). The Story of the Lovat Scouts 1900-1980. St Andrew Press. ISBN 1-904440-03-7.
- Mileham, Patrick (1994). The Yeomanry Regiments; 200 Years of Tradition. Edinburgh: Canongate Academic. ISBN 1-898410-36-4.
- Plaster, John (2006). The Ultimate Sniper: An Advanced Training Manual for Military and Police Snipers. Boulder, CO: Paladin Press. ISBN 978-0-87364-704-5.
- Rinaldi, Richard A (2008). Order of Battle of the British Army 1914. Ravi Rikhye. ISBN 978-0-97760728-0.
