= Juba (sniper) =

Anonymous Iraqi sniper

Juba - Azamulaneze
- Known for: Sniper in the Iraqi insurgency
- Military career
- Allegiance: Islamic Army in Iraq
- Nickname: Joba
- Conflicts: Iraqi Insurgency

Juba (Arabic: جوبا), sometimes spelled Joba, also known as Juba the Baghdad Sniper, is the pseudonym of an anonymous sniper with the Sunni insurgent group Islamic Army in Iraq involved in the Iraqi insurgency, featured in several videos released between 2005 and 2007. Juba became famous after videos showing footage of his shootings appeared online. The second of these videos shows Juba marking a tally of 37 "kills". Juba became a folk hero among many Iraqis due to his role in fighting against the American occupation of Iraq.

Juba worked in mostly Sunni parts of Iraq, specifically the Al Anbar province. Juba's videos showed real battle scenes with background nasheeds. In many videos, Juba is seen killing and wounding multiple American soldiers with what seems to be a Dragunov sniper rifle. Juba is seen wounding and killing at ranges of a few hundred meters to approximately a thousand meters in the videos, several of them involving precision shots to the head. Juba waits for U.S. soldiers to dismount, or stand up in a Humvee turret, and aims for gaps in their body armor, the lower spine, ribs, or above the chest. There have been speculations that Juba is not one person but multiple snipers working under a pseudonym. The number of kills Juba claimed has also been debated as not all were verified. The IAI statistics claims that from 2005 to 2006 that the sniper brigade had killed 634 American soldiers, 23 military officer, 11 American snipers and wounded 206 American soldiers. However, according to sniper expert and Vietnam War veteran, John Plaster, Juba may have killed around 143 American service members.

== Videos ==
Several video clips which show the actions of Juba have been circulated over the Internet. Videos included parts of anti-U.S sniper operations with digital cameras mounted over the sniper rifle. These videos can also be found on YouTube.

=== First video ===
In November 2005, a video which was circulating in Iraq appeared on the Internet. The video, attributed to the Sunni insurgent group Islamic Army in Iraq, showed American soldiers being shot and falling to the ground. The video starts with a man saying, "I have nine bullets in this gun, and I have a present for George Bush. I am going to kill nine soldiers. I am doing this for the viewers to watch. God is greater. God is greater." With that, he makes his way from the vehicle, and a series of separate scenes follow showing several individuals shot in action.

=== Second video ===
A second "Juba" video was distributed in 2006 in western Baghdad and released on the Internet in late October 2006. The video contained an interview with the supposed commander of the Baghdad sniper division, the footage shows numerous fighters being trained in the use of sniper rifles. The video discusses the alleged fear generated in coalition forces by insurgency snipers and shows "Juba" returning from a sniping mission, marking a tally of 37 on a wall. The sniper then sits down to make a diary entry. The video claims that there are dozens of snipers operating within the IAI and other factions, and shows more being trained. The rest of the video shows numerous clips of U.S. soldiers being sniped with nasheeds in the background, and an insurgent commander explaining that his men are inspired and trained to an extent based on the information in the book The Ultimate Sniper by retired Major and U.S. Army sniper John Plaster.

=== Third and fourth videos ===
In December 2007, "Juba - The Baghdad Sniper 3" was released on the Internet. The production quality of the video had improved from Islamic Army's previous releases; the video was made available in nine languages. This video also refers to a website that is supposedly connected to the Juba character. In 2008, "Juba - The Baghdad Sniper 4" was released on the Internet and on that website.

== Fate ==
Juba, or one of multiple snipers who may have used the title, was rumored to have been captured along with his cameraman at a coalition checkpoint in Baghdad on June 2, 2015, but this has not been confirmed. US Marine sniper A. J. Pasciuti believes he killed Juba in Habbaniyah on June 16, 2006. A Marine M40 A1 sniper rifle was recovered from the body that had been captured by Iraqi insurgents two years previously. Again, no positive identification was made.

== In popular culture ==
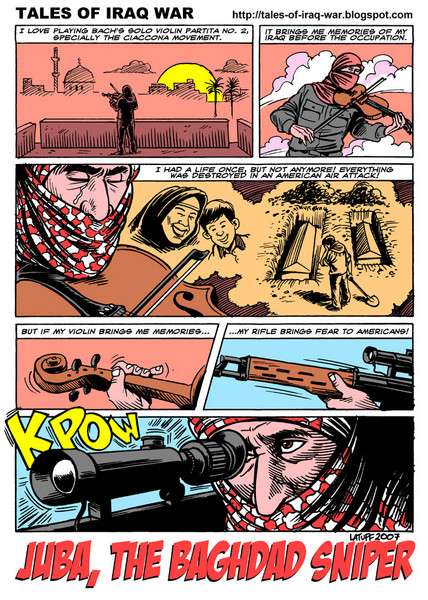
Juba webcomic by Brazilian political cartoonist Carlos Latuff

Juba is the basis for the expert insurgent sniper character codenamed "Mustafa" in the war film American Sniper.

Juba is referenced multiple times in the 2017 war film The Wall voiced by Laith Nakli.

Juba is the main antagonist in the Stephen Hunter novel "Game of Snipers" where the main character, Retired Gunnery Sergeant Bob Lee Swagger, is tasked by the CIA to track the evasive Jihadist sniper.

== See also ==
- Simo Häyhä
- Lyudmila Pavlichenko
- Abu Tahsin al-Salihi
- Chris Kyle
- Clive Hulme
- Tha'ir Kayid Hamad
- Nguyễn Văn Cốc
- Erwin König
