= Mr. & Mrs. John Sacrimoni Request... =

- The Sopranos episode
- Episode no.: Season 6 Episode 5
- Directed by: Steve Buscemi
- Written by: Terence Winter
- Cinematography by: Phil Abraham
- Production code: 605
- Original air date: April 9, 2006
- Running time: 52 minutes

Episode chronology
← Previous "The Fleshy Part of the Thigh"	Next → "Live Free or Die"
- The Sopranos season 6

"Mr. & Mrs. John Sacrimoni Request..." is the 70th episode of the HBO original series The Sopranos and the fifth of the show's sixth season. Written by Terence Winter and directed by Steve Buscemi, it originally aired on April 9, 2006. On its debut, the episode was the most-watched show of the week on U.S. cable TV.

== Starring ==
- James Gandolfini as Tony Soprano
- Lorraine Bracco as Dr. Jennifer Melfi
- Edie Falco as Carmela Soprano
- Michael Imperioli as Christopher Moltisanti
- Dominic Chianese as Corrado Soprano, Jr.
- Steven Van Zandt as Silvio Dante
- Tony Sirico as Paulie Gualtieri
- Robert Iler as Anthony Soprano, Jr.
- Jamie-Lynn Sigler as Meadow Soprano
- Aida Turturro as Janice Soprano Baccalieri *
- Steven R. Schirripa as Bobby Baccalieri
- Vincent Curatola as Johnny "Sack" Sacrimoni
- Frank Vincent as Phil Leotardo
- Joseph R. Gannascoli as Vito Spatafore
- Dan Grimaldi as Patsy Parisi

* = credit only

=== Guest starring ===
- Sharon Angela as Rosalie Aprile
- Denise Borino as Ginny Sacrimoni
- Elizabeth Bracco as Marie Spatafore
- Carl Capotorto as Little Paulie Germani
- Max Casella as Benny Fazio
- Will Janowitz as Finn De Trolio
- Anthony Ribustello as Dante Greco
- Frankie Valli as Rusty Millio
- Maureen Van Zandt as Gabriella Dante
- Louis Gross as Perry Annunziata
- Caitlin Van Zandt as Allegra Sacrimoni
- Adam Mucci as Eric DiBenedetto
- Taleb Adlah as Ahmed
- Donnie Keshawarz as Muhammad
- Arthur J. Nascarella as Carlo Gervasi
- William DeMeo as Jason Molinaro
- Josh Pais as Zev Charney
- Brad Zimmerman as Ron Perse
- Jeffrey Joseph as Deputy Mayweather
- Mike Pniewski as Deputy Featham
- Robert Hirschfeld as Judge Holzer
- Randy Barbee as Judge Whitney Runions
- Alysia Reiner as Linda Vaughn
- Dan Castleman as Prosecutor Castleman
- Cristin Milioti as Catherine Sacrimoni
- John Bianco as Gerry Torciano
- John "Cha Cha" Ciarcia as Albie Cianflone
- Merel Julia as Gianna Millio
- Lenny Venito as "Murmur"
- Jeffrey M. Marchetti as Peter LaRosa
- Frank Borrelli as Vito Spatafore, Jr.
- Paulina Gerzon as Francesca Spatafore
- Joe Iacona as Johnny's Dad
- Jean Marie Evans as Aunt Louise
- Irma St. Paul as Aunt Grace
- Erik Martin as Nurse Hasley
- Joey Vega as U.S. Marshal #1
- Teresa Meza as U.S. Marshal #2
- Jimmy Smagula as Wise Guy #1 (Sal Iacuzzo)
- Jared DiCroce as Wise Guy #2
- Anthony Stropoli as Rick
- David Coburn as Bartender
- Carmine Parisi as Priest
- Lou Martini Jr. as Anthony Infante

== Synopsis ==
A judge decides Junior's mental condition has deteriorated to the level where he can be held in a private psychiatric facility while awaiting his retrial. Tony does not want to see or hear of his uncle again. Carmela quickly fetches a newspaper with a report about Junior's "cushy psych lockup" and throws that section in the trash before Tony can see it.

At the Bada Bing, Ahmed and Muhammad ask Chris about getting some Tec-9 semi-automatic weapons for their "family troubles." Dealing with a phone call, Chris does not answer.

Johnny is granted a six-hour strictly controlled release from prison in order to attend his daughter Allegra's wedding, all extra security expenses to be borne by him. At the wedding, Tony collapses bending down to remove his shoes at the request of U.S. Marshals. During the reception, he talks to Johnny for the first time since his arrest. Through Phil, Tony has received Johnny's request to take care of killing New York capo Rusty Millio who, Johnny fears, may trigger another power struggle within the Lupertazzi family; Tony has refused. As a personal favor, Johnny himself asks Tony to do it. Watched by U.S. Marshals, they join Johnny's aged relatives, either deaf or senile, at a large table and, pretending to speak to them, discuss the situation obliquely. Tony reluctantly agrees. Shortly after, he suggests to Christopher that a contact from Italy should be brought in to kill Rusty and leave the country the same day.

Johnny's happiness at the wedding is cut short when the Marshals tell him his time is up. He cries in front of the guests as Marshals haul him away; his wife Ginny faints. Led by Phil, the Lupertazzis and Tony's crew speak of their loss of respect for Johnny. Only Tony stands up for him.

At home later that night, Vito tells his wife he is heading out to make collections, but instead goes to a gay club. Dancing in leather fetish garb, he is spotted by two New York associates making collections. Although Vito tries to pass it off as a joke, they call him a "fag" and leave. Vito collects a gun and some cash from home and checks into a motel. After an exploratory phone call to Silvio, he makes no further contact with anyone and does not return calls from Tony.

Tony returns to work with a new bodyguard and driver, Perry Annunziata, a muscular, hot-headed young man. Tony shows his scar to his crew and begins to bore them describing his medical procedures. Silvio interrupts him, sensing Tony is being too vulnerable and weakening his alpha-male persona, changing the topic. Tony tells Dr. Melfi that they are giving him "certain looks" and are beginning to question his judgment. She advises him to "act as if you are not feeling vulnerable. As if you're the same Anthony." Tony, scans his crew sizing up every member. He asserts himself through an act of unpredictable violence. Finding a pretext, he starts a one-sided fight with the younger and significantly more physically fit Perry that ends with Perry bleeding on the floor and Tony walking away, seemingly unscathed. However, when he retreats to the bathroom he vomits blood. Leaning on the bathroom sink, he looks at himself in the mirror and smiles. Then he vomits again.

== First appearances ==
- Perry Annunziata: Tony's new driver and bodyguard.
- Vito Spatafore, Jr.: Vito's young son.
- Francesca Spatafore: Vito's daughter.

== Production ==
- The location of the reception scene is at Leonard's of Great Neck (now Leonard's Palazzo) on Northern Boulevard in University Gardens, New York.
- The location of the church where the marriage took place was at the Episcopal Christ Church and Holy Family in Cobble Hill, Brooklyn.
- Despite sharing the same last name, Caitlin Van Zandt, who plays Johnny "Sack"'s daughter Allegra, is not related to Steven Van Zandt, who plays Silvio Dante.

== Other cultural references ==
- Perry was a first runner-up in Mr. Teenage Bloomfield.
- When dressing for his court appearance, it is specifically stated that Johnny "Sack" wears a Brioni suit.
- Tony tells Melfi that Tylenol helps him sleep. He later mentions vacuum-assisted closure, Ativan and Dilaudid.
- When Dante Greco offers to set a timer to remind Tony to take his medications, Silvio derisively comments "Nurse Betty over here."
- Talking to Tony, Phil Leotardo refers to Rusty Millio as "the mayor of Munchkinland."
- When Tony takes a nap with Carmela he says "Smells good. Downy Fresh".
- When Muhammad and Ahmed meet Christopher to pay for stolen credit card numbers and order weapons, Christopher greets them with a reference to the Ali Baba story: "Where are the rest of the 40 thieves?". Christopher also quips, when handing over the stolen credit card numbers: "Don't leave home without them!" This confuses the Middle Easterners, who are unfamiliar with the American Express advertising campaign Chris is referring to.
- Carmela picks up a newspaper headlining Junior's move to a prison psychiatric facility, using the phrase "Don Squirrel-Leone," mocking his mental state with reference to "Don Corleone" from The Godfather.
- Johnny "Sack" angrily asks his lawyer if he has read recent GQ magazines after inspecting the dress shoes brought to him.
- As the wedding guests walk through the heightened security at the church of John's daughter's wedding as part of one of the conditions that would allow John to be granted leave for the wedding, Tony makes a remark "You'd think bin Laden was getting married in there."
- Christopher erroneously comments to Paulie that "Allegra" (the bride's name) is a brand of cold medication. The antihistamine drug Fexofenadine is sold under the brand name Allegra, which is touted in its commercials as an allergy medication that does not cause drowsiness like other similar medications.
- Vito Spatafore calls the construction official interested in "playing ball" with the mob Joe DiMaggio.
- When Allegra and Eric are in the limousine to leave for their honeymoon in Hawaii, Phil yells, "Say hi to Don Ho!"
- Phil and Tony's men make "Cinderella" references (e.g., "his coach turned into a pumpkin" or "even Cinderella didn't cry") when the Marshals abruptly cut the festivities short to make an embarrassing public display of returning John to prison.
- When Vito leaves for the leather bar, Marie Spatafore is watching the movie Imitation of Life. This is an allusion to the double life Vito is living as a gay man.
- Christopher suggests that Tony wouldn’t be able to refuse a request from John on the day of his daughter’s wedding, as depicted in The Godfather. Tony then corrects him that it is supposed to be the other way around, stating "I should be asking him for something."
- Junior is taking Coumadin.
- Tony derisively calls Perry a "Philadelphia lawyer."

== Music ==
- The song played at the Bada Bing! VIP room where strippers are dancing and Ahmed and Muhammad come in looking for Christopher is "I Need a Freak" by Sexual Harassment.
- When the Soprano family enters the wedding party, The Four Seasons is playing.
- At Allegra's wedding party, the hired band plays and the singer sings:
  - "Ain't That a Kick in the Head?" by Jimmy Van Heusen and Sammy Cahn.
  - "At Last" by Mack Gordon and Harry Warren
  - An instrumental version of "Unchained Melody" when Tony and Chris are discussing the hit.
  - "Daddy's Little Girl" by Robert Burke and Horace Gerlach
  - "The Bride Cuts the Cake," which is based on the melody of "The Farmer in the Dell"
- The song played at the New York gay bar, where Vito is outed, is "Flashing For Money" by Deep Dish.
- As Vito checks into the motel, "The Three Bells" by The Browns is played — specifically, the second verse, about Jimmy Brown's marriage. The song is also used in the previous episode, "The Fleshy Part of the Thigh," though in that instance, the first verse (about Jimmy Brown's birth) is featured.
- The song played over the end credits is "Every Day of the Week" by The Students.

== Reception ==
This episode led the Nielsen U.S. cable ratings for the week of April 3 to 9 with 8.58 million viewers and a 5.1 rating. This was the fourth straight episode of the season with declining viewership.

Television Without Pity graded the episode with an A−. Its review concluded: "Like Vito, Tony's façade and secret life have disappeared to a much greater extent than ever before."

For The Star-Ledger, Alan Sepinwall found the scene of Vito at the gay bar to be "cheap and over-the-top" while praising the overall plot and character development of Tony: "Though he's physically weakened, the people around him seem to be changing more than he is."
