= Semper Fi (film) =

2019 film directed by Henry Alex Rubin

- Theatrical release poster
- Directed by: Henry-Alex Rubin
- Written by: Henry-Alex Rubin; Sean Mullin
- Produced by: David Lancaster; Karina Miller
- Starring: Jai Courtney; Nat Wolff; Finn Wittrock; Beau Knapp; Arturo Castro; Leighton Meester
- Cinematography: David Devlin
- Edited by: Kevin Tent; Kyle Valenta
- Music by: Hanan Townshend
- Production companies: Concourse Media; Sparkhouse; Rumble Films
- Distributed by: Lionsgate
- Release date: October 4, 2019 (United States)
- Running time: 99 minutes
- Countries: United States; United Kingdom
- Language: English
- Budget: $6.6 million
- Box office: $6,584

Semper Fi (also known as Brothers in Arms) is a 2019 crime drama film directed by Henry-Alex Rubin and written by Rubin and Sean Mullin. It stars Jai Courtney, Nat Wolff, Finn Wittrock, Beau Knapp, Arturo Castro, and Leighton Meester.

It was released on October 4, 2019, by Lionsgate.

== Plot ==
In 2005, close friends "Cal" (Jai Courtney), "Milk" (Beau Knapp), "Jaeger" (Finn Wittrock), "Snowball" (Arturo Castro) and "Oyster" (Nat Wolff) bowl at Westside Lanes in Bridgewater, NY. Their nicknames are carved into their respective balls. After some roughhousing, an employee named Tony threatens to have them removed, but they show him Cal's police badge. Cal makes a deal with Tony to buy drinks for them all if Oyster can bowl 3 strikes, otherwise he agrees to make his friends leave. Oyster's third roll is a miss because he does it blindfolded, but with much laughter and joking, Tony doesn't throw them out.

Cal, whose full name is Chris Callahan, is a police officer, Milk (whose last name is Milkowski) is a firefighter at the Ernest J Cooper Memorial Fire Station, Jaeger is an auto body detailer and Snowball is a dockside crane operator. Oyster, who is Cal's half-brother, works at a diner.

Together, all five enlist in the Marine Corps Reserve and they report to Fort Drum, where Cal is appointed their Staff Sergeant. Oyster proves to be a slovenly recruit, he frequently picks fights, forgets his cap, and is generally reckless during their time. Oyster is frequently given punishment duties spending most of his free time cleaning toilets. Over time the difference between Oyster and Cal's roles creates resentment between the two brothers. Cal is the responsible Staff Sergeant while Oyster is seen as the unit's screw-up.

At home after leaving Fort Drum, the brothers argue. Oyster has had prior felony convictions, and Cal reminds him that one more will land him back in prison. Oyster argues back that he has big dreams, which Cal feels are empty pipe dreams. Cal wishes for the best for his brother while Oyster resents how perfect and easy Cal seems to have things in life. One evening their arguing turns into a scuffle, where Oyster accidentally gets hurt. Cal tries to make amends to his brother, but Oyster has locked himself in his bedroom. As Cal tries to apologise through the door, Oyster sulks and sullenly plucks at his guitar.

Late at night, at Old Point Bar, they start to chat up two girls, Carrie and Val, to whom Cal shows the tattoo on his forearms: Semper Fidelis. Cal and Jaeger spot Jaeger's ex-girlfriend, Clara (Leighton Meester), who has returned to town. When they go over to chat, both are rebuffed because of Jaeger’s rudeness. As the evening goes on, a drunken Oyster demands $10 to buy drinks for Carrie and Val, but Cal declines his request.

As the evening draws to a close, Cal, Milk, and Jaeger head out into the night for a friendly race home. Cal warns Oyster not to get too drunk or let his temper get him into trouble. Oyster walks away but finally manages to get the drink money from another friend, Dwyer ("DJ"). However, when he approaches Carrie and Val he discovers that he is too late as the women are now talking with Ben Daley. Oyster shoves Ben aside and angrily hands the drinks to the girls, before walking off despondently.

When Oyster goes to use the restroom, Ben and a friend come in and pick a fight with him. Ben punches Oyster in the stomach twice before Oyster retaliates by hitting him in the head. Ben falls backward, hits his head hard on a porcelain urinal, and lands on the floor. In a horrendous turn of events, it appears as if Cal's warning to Oyster has come true. Oyster starts to panic as he stands over the prone Ben, who is now lifeless on the floor with blood coming out of his ear.

At home studying Arabic in the quiet, Cal gets a call from Oyster, then hurriedly dresses and returns to the bar in his police cruiser. Cal learns that Oyster was involved in the assault on Ben but he has fled the scene and is nowhere to be found. Cal sets off to find his brother starting back at their house, he finds the bedroom drawers empty, indicating that Oyster has gone on the run. He finally spots his brother's Bronco at Snowball's apartment and, since is on duty, he calls it in. Snowball attempts to intervene, explaining that he witnessed the fight and that Oyster was just defending himself. However, Cal knows that he needs to do his duty and is forced to arrest Oyster. In order to calm things down and assure Oyster, he calls him by his real name, Teddy, telling him everything will be OK.

Scared and panicked beyond distraught, Oyster attempts to flee. Cal tackles him to the ground and places him in handcuffs as other officers arrive. As Oyster is being taken into custody, a senior officer arrives and informs Cal and Oyster that Ben has died, changing the charge from assault to murder. Realizing this now means Oyster could go to jail for life, Cal is visibly distraught. While being placed in a squad car, Oyster shouts profanities at Cal, leaving him grief-stricken.

Eight months later, Cal, Snowball, Jaeger, and Milk are on full active duty in the Mosul province of Iraq. Aware of the mounting casualty toll from remote IEDs, the four friends decide to do something. They improvise a radio jammer to prevent the detonation of IEDs. Later their convoy heads out on patrol of the streets of Mosul and the jammer proves ineffective and one of their humvees is hit with an explosion. Jaeger's leg is horrifically injured. Cal manages to keep Jaeger alive until medical staff can take over. Once Jaeger is evacuated, Cal's unit is ordered to raid nearby buildings and find a specific resident. With no interpreter, the unit's approach is disorganised and they are unable to find the man in question. The locals respond angrily to the soldiers and when one of them threatens Cal's unit, resulting in Cal shooting the man dead. Cal is distraught.

Meanwhile, in Watertown, NY, Oyster has begun his 25-year sentence at Franklin Correctional Facility. He tries to keep a low profile but while he's on cooking duty, the prison guards notice him sneaking apples into pancakes to increase flavour. Oyster is invited into the pantry under the pretense that the guards are giving him more ingredients in order to make apple pies. While his back is turned, he is set upon by three guards who beat him mercilessly, leaving him badly injured.

Cal completes his tour of Iraq and returns with Snowball, Jaeger, and Milk to a town welcoming them all as heroes. But Cal has changed and is sullen. Due to his arrest of Oyster, no family have turned up to meet him. Clara eventually agrees to drive him home. His family feels that Oyster is imprisoned unjustly and Cal is at fault. The next day, when Cal goes to visit and reconcile with Oyster, he is saddened to learn that Oyster doesn't want to see him. Cal returns later to the prison with Snowball to act as a mediator, but the mediation does not go well. The meeting descends into a shouting match that even Snowball can't stop. As the two brothers argue, old resentments between the two brothers resurface, including the fact that Cal long ago was made legal guardian of Oyster. Eventually, the Prison Guards intervene, pulling the brothers apart, but not before Snowball notices bruising on Oyster's chest.

Disheartened at the injustice of Oyster's lengthy sentence, Cal and Snowball start probing into legal ways to get Oyster released. First, they petition for Oyster to be moved to a new prison. However, when they investigate the abuse Oyster is suffering, the guards learn about this and threaten Oyster to keep his mouth shut. Cal believes that Oyster's appeal may be aided by getting Dwyer (a key witness in Ben's death) to alter his testimony. He approaches Dwyer and attempts to get him to tell the truth about the altercation and what led to the fatal fight. The discussion turns badly and gets violent descending into a fight and consequently, Cal is suspended from duty. Even Clara, who provides free legal service to veterans, can't seem to make any headway.

Cal, Snowball, and Clara then visit Jaeger at Walter Reed Medical Hospital in Maryland, where they learn that he has lost the lower third of his right leg. Cal brings Jaeger home. Finally reunited with his friends, Jaeger quietly voices his concerns as to Cal's mental state, as well as Oyster's well-being.

Sleepless nights and bouts of rage envelop Cal. He is unable to see a way forward and fears he may never save Oyster. Cal meets with Jaeger and Snowball and rants that if he were to shoot someone at home like he did in Iraq, he'd be in prison for it. One night, after a visit to the VFW hall, Cal breaks down. His three friends remind him they need him.

Cal decides that they cannot wait on the judicial system to free Oyster, Cal tells Snowball, Jaeger, and Milk that their only option left is to break Oyster out of prison. Once he is out, they can smuggle him across the border into Canada. Cal informs the three friends that he's not asking for their advice. Cal pinpoints Oyster's upcoming transfer to another facility as the perfect time to free his brother. Snowball and Jaeger agree to join him, while Milk is opposed. He relents eventually and the four friends plan the prison break.

As the plan comes to fruition, the foursome's military expertise starts to pay off. The plan is seemingly straightforward, Oyster once freed will be transported across the water into Canada at Snowball's place of work. Snowball also organises false documentation for Oyster. Clara grows suspicious of what the four are up to and confronts Cal. After he queries her on the prison sentences for jailbreakers, she realises he intends to break Oyster out of prison. Cal explains to her in detail the abuse Oyster is facing in prison while also explaining the futility of an appeal. Eventually, over the course of the night, she realizes that Cal may in fact be right and agrees to go along with the prison break. She even tells Cal she'll lie to provide Jaeger with an alibi as they still have feelings for each other.

Cal and the friends put the plan into action, freeing Oyster from the prison transport. Oyster is taken to Snowball's work and quickly moved to Canada. The brothers say their farewells and make peace with one another. With Oyster now free, Cal decides to surrender.

== Cast ==
- Jai Courtney as Officer Chris "Cal" Callahan
- Nat Wolff as Teddy "Oyster"
- Finn Wittrock as "Jaeger"
- Beau Knapp as "Milk" Milkowski
- Arturo Castro as "Snowball"
- Leighton Meester as Clara
- Lance E. Nichols as Balfour
- Rachel Hendrix as Rachel
- Wayne Péré as Tom Nichols
- Sylvie Grace Crim as Carrie
- Ashton Leigh as Val

== Production ==
Principal photography began on 1 February 2018 in Louisiana. On 12 December that year it was confirmed that filming had wrapped.

== Release ==
In May 2019, Lionsgate acquired North American distribution rights to the film. It was released in the USA on October 4, 2019.

== Critical reception ==
Semper Fi received negative reviews from film critics. It holds a 19% approval rating on review aggregator website Rotten Tomatoes, based on 16 reviews, with an average of 4.8/10. On Metacritic, the film holds a rating of 48 out of 100, based on 5 critics, indicating "mixed or average reviews".
