= It Ain't Over (film) =

- Theatrical release poster
- Directed by: Sean Mullin
- Written by: Sean Mullin
- Produced by: Natalie Metzger; Matt Miller; Michael Sobiloff; Peter Sobiloff
- Starring: Yogi Berra
- Cinematography: Daniel Vecchione
- Edited by: Julian Robinson
- Music by: Jacques Brautbar
- Production companies: Vanishing Angle; Off Media
- Distributed by: Sony Pictures Classics
- Release dates: June 11, 2022 (Tribeca); May 12, 2023 (United States)
- Running time: 98 minutes
- Country: United States
- Language: English
- Box office: $705,355

It Ain't Over is a 2022 American documentary film about New York Yankee Hall of Fame catcher Yogi Berra. It was written and directed by Sean Mullin. The film premiered at the Tribeca Festival in June 2022, and was theatrically released in the United States on May 12, 2023.

== Cast ==
The film features interviews with the following people:

- Roger Angell
- Dale Berra
- Bobby Brown
- Bob Costas
- Billy Crystal
- Al Downing
- Joe Garagiola Jr.
- Joe Girardi
- Ron Guidry
- Derek Jeter
- Tony Kubek
- Don Mattingly
- Willie Randolph
- Bobby Richardson
- Mariano Rivera
- Vin Scully
- Nick Swisher
- Ralph Terry
- Joe Torre
- Suzyn Waldman

== Reception ==
=== Box office ===
The film made $88,504 from 99 theaters in its opening weekend.

=== Critical response ===
On the review aggregator website Rotten Tomatoes, 98% of 53 critics' reviews are positive, with an average rating of 7.9/10. The website's consensus reads: "While fittingly echoing Yogi Berra's famously sunny disposition, It Ain't Over persuasively makes the case for his incredible achievements on and off the baseball diamond." Metacritic, which uses a weighted average, assigned the film a score of 78 out of 100, based on 12 critics, indicating "generally favorable" reviews.

== Awards & Nominations ==
| Award | Year | Category | Recipient | Result | Ref. |
|---|---|---|---|---|---|
| International Catholic Film Critics Association | 2024 | ICFCA Award Best Documentary | Sean Mullin | Nominated | |
| Writers Guild of America, USA | 2024 | WGA Award (Screen) Documentary Screenplay | Sean Mullin | Nominated | |
| Critics' Choice Documentary Awards | 2023 | Critics' Choice Documentary Award Best Archival Documentary | Sony Pictures Classics | Nominated | |
| St. Louis Film Critics Association, US | 2023 | SLFCA Award Best Documentary Film | Sean Mullin | Nominated | |
| Calgary International Film Festival | 2022 | Best International Documentary Best International Documentary | Sean Mullin | Nominated | |
| Nantucket Film Festival | 2022 | Audience Award Best Feature | Sean Mullin | Won | |

== See also ==
- List of baseball films
