= Amira & Sam =

- Directed by: Sean Mullin
- Screenplay by: Sean Mullin
- Produced by: Matt Miller; Erich Lochner; Terry Leonard; Timothy R. Boyce Jr.; Michael Connors; Sean Mullin; Julian Robinson
- Starring: Martin Starr; Dina Shihabi; Paul Wesley; Laith Nakli; David Rasche
- Cinematography: Daniel Vecchione
- Edited by: Julian Robinson
- Music by: Heather McIntosh
- Production companies: Five By Eight Productions; Hole in 1 Productions; Strongman; Vanishing Angle
- Distributed by: Drafthouse Films
- Release dates: May 30, 2014 (Seattle International Film Festival); January 30, 2015 (US)
- Country: United States
- Language: English
- Box office: $31,849

Amira & Sam is a 2014 American romantic comedy film written and directed by Sean Mullin and produced by Terry Leonard, Erich Lochner, and Matt Miller with executive producers James Ponsoldt, Meg Montagnino-Jarrett, and Peter Sobiloff. Set in New York City, the film is about Sam, an American soldier, and Amira, an illegal immigrant from Iraq. Drafthouse Cinemas has the distribution rights.

The film has several story elements, including capitalism, immigration, life after the military, and attempting to be successful in the entertainment world.

== Plot ==
The film is set in New York City in 2008, prior to the Great Recession. Sam Seneca, a former Green Beret who served in Afghanistan and Iraq, meets Amira Jafari when he visits her uncle, Bassam Jafari, who had served as Sam's Iraqi translator. Bassam and Sam have a special bond due to their time together in the war.

Initially Amira does not trust him because he was an American soldier and her brother was killed by a bomb from American troops in the war. After getting fired from his job as a security guard for punishing a group of rude people, Sam's cousin, Charlie Seneca, asks Sam to help him with illegal hedge funds; the true status of the legality is unbeknownst to Sam at the time. Amira is staying with her uncle Bassam since her father died.

She sells bootlegged films on the street corner but is forced to flee after getting busted. Bassam calls Sam to inform him of what happened with Amira and asks him to let Amira stay with him. Sam agrees and goes to Amira and Bassam's apartment to get Amira. Amira tells Sam that she cannot go back to Iraq because it became too dangerous for her after her family started helping American soldiers.

Bassam tried to claim her as a dependent but they had trouble with the courts. Therefore, if Amira was arrested, she would be deported to Iraq as an illegal immigrant. Although reluctant at first Amira eventually agrees to go and stay with Sam. Sam and Amira begin spending time together with both learning to enjoy the company of the other and slowly beginning to fall in love.

While at a gathering with Charlie and his friends from work, Sam learns from one of Charlie's friends that Charlie's hedge funds that he has been helping Charlie with may be illegal. He confronts Charlie over it but Charlie denies this is the case. Back at Sam's apartment, Sam and Amira share a bed and Amira reveals that she read Sam's notebook of jokes that he had written when Sam hoped to become a stand-up comedian but didn't do so well.

After an exchange of words the two kiss, but do not become too intimate. The next day at Charlie's invitation, Sam and Amira attend a party Charlie is having. While at the party Sam only becomes more suspicious of Charlie's hedge funds. Amira meanwhile faces certain degrees of racism, particularly from Sam's Uncle Nick Seneca, who tells Sam that he was in 4 World Trade Center when the September 11 attacks occurred and watched three of his friends die when the Twin Towers were hit with planes.

Not wanting to be involved in Charlie's hedge funds and displeased with the party and guests Sam decides to leave. Charlie tries to stop him which results in a brief scuffle between the two cousins. Amira attempts to intervene but unintentionally hits Charlie's pregnant wife Claire Seneca in the commotion.

Sam and Amira leave the party and head back to Sam's apartment. After sharing a moment of passion, Sam and Amira have sex. The next morning, two police officers arrive and arrest Amira saying that she's being charged with assaulting Claire. Bassam arrives at the police station where Sam is already waiting.

One of the police officers involved in the arrest informs Sam and Bassam that it was revealed that Amira is an illegal immigrant and will be released on bail tomorrow and will be deported back to Iraq the day after. Sam meets with Charlie later where Sam tells him that Amira is being deported. Although Charlie says that he'll have Claire drop the charges Sam tells him it's too late and again asks Charlie about his hedge funds.

Charlie comes clean and confirms that they are illegal but that he's rigged the system so that no one would ever find out about it. Later that night, Amira calls Sam from jail and confesses her love for him and asks to spend one last day together with him.

The next day, Sam comes over to Bassam and Amira's apartment where Bassam says that he is going back to Iraq with Amira to look after her despite Amira's protests. Bassam asks Sam to leave but Amira firmly states that she's spending her last day with Sam.

The two go out and enjoy an entire day of passion. At the end of the day Amira asks Sam to try his luck at stand-up comedy for her. He does so and has good success. On stage Sam confesses his love for Amira and asks her in Arabic to run away together with him. Amira agrees and asks where but Sam says that he doesn't know and doesn't care. The next day, without Sam's help Charlie's hedge funds don't go through and Sam and Amira leave a note for Bassam.

Sam and Amira tell Bassam that they are leaving New York City to be together and avoid Amira's deportation and that they will be in touch as soon as they settle down somewhere else. Bassam smiles happily understanding Sam and Amira's love and knowing that he and Amira will not have to go back to Iraq. Sam and Amira are then seen leaving New York City looking forward to a bright future together.

== Cast ==
Nabila Pathan of Al Arabiya wrote that the film's protagonists, Amira and Sam, both have "non-conformist" attitudes.

- Amira Jafari (Dina Shihabi) - A Muslim woman from Iraq, Amira is an illegal immigrant and sells unlicensed movies. She identifies as a Muslim American but is not strict with the Islamic religion.
  - She wears a khimar (hijab) with miniskirts and low-cut tops. This clothing choice is intentional, and when a Muslim woman observing hijab criticizes her choices, Amira responds by telling her to mind her own business. Mullin stated that the scene demonstrates that Amira feels trapped between American and Iraqi cultures and that she does not represent Islam.
  - Shihabi immigrated to the U.S. at age 18 and began living in New York City so she could become an actress; she used her previous experiences of culture shock in her performance as Amira. Previously she resided in Saudi Arabia and Dubai, United Arab Emirates. She stated she was interested in Amira & Sam because of her own background. Shihabi researched the cases of Iraqi translators attempting to come to the U.S. to prepare for her role.
  - Andrew O'Hehir of Salon describes her as "a saucy, rebellious Muslim girl trying out the new roles made available to her, at least temporarily, in America." Jeannette Catsoulis of The New York Times described her as "a sharp-tongued hottie — hijab above, party below — given to heedless lawbreaking."
- Sam Seneca (Martin Starr)
  - He is an Italian American former Green Beret sergeant. Unlike many other veterans, he does not suffer from post-traumatic stress disorder (PTSD). He loses his job as a security guard in an apartment complex after he intentionally traps some poorly-behaving tenants in an elevator. Sam has difficulty fitting into the American culture around him. He also tries to be a stand-up comic.
  - O'Hehir described him as "an introspective guy with a dry wit" and "as laconic as" the fictionalized depiction of Chris Kyle in the film American Sniper. O'Hehir also described Sam as "somewhat the black sheep" in his family. Sheri Linden of the Los Angeles Times wrote that Sam's "deadpan humor makes him the perfect foil for feisty Amira." Nick Schager of The A.V. Club stated that Sam, a "basically a one-note flawless good guy", had lacked charisma and complexity, and was "far more stoic and upstanding" compared to Bertram Gilfoyle of Silicon Valley, another character played by Starr.
- Bassam Jafari (Laith Nakli)
- Charlie Seneca (Paul Wesley) - Charlie, Sam's cousin and a hedge fund manager, asks Sam to encourage veterans to invest in his financial schemes. As time passes Sam learns the true nature of Charlie's operations.
  - Tom Keogh of the Seattle Times describes him as "manipulative." Linden describes him as "a stereotypical finance guy but not without compassion". Schager, however, stated that Charlie was "an untrustworthy me-first crook" who only values Sam because of his potential usefulness to him.
  - Wesley suggested that Charlie have a pregnant wife in order to give him a motive for engaging in the fraud and to make him more sympathetic; Charlie's motive would be that he would have to take care of his child.
- Jack (David Rasche)
- Greg (Ross Marquand)
- Claire Seneca (Taylor Wilcox)
- Officer Velez (Teddy Cañez)

Sean Mullin makes a cameo as the host of a stand-up comedy routine in which Sam performs.

== Background ==
Mullin, a former member of the New York Army National Guard, had performed stand-up comedy and was a first responder in the September 11 attacks. He decided to create the film after hearing about friends in the U.S. military trying to get asylum for their Iraqi translators.

== Production ==
Much of the film was shot on Staten Island.

Shihabi and Naikli used an Iraqi dialect coach, one of Nakli's friends, to refine their Arabic. Shihabi's native dialect is a form of Levantine Arabic while she used Iraqi Arabic in the film.

Nakli also served as an associate producer in recognition of the contributions he made to the film.

The director, Mullin, used suggestions from the actors to shape the film and there were periods where actors improvised.

At the end of the movie, the song "Havre de Grace" by Zerobridge was played.

== Awards & nominations ==
| Award | Year | Category | Recipient | Result | Ref. |
|---|---|---|---|---|---|
| Seattle International Film Festival | 2014 | New American Cinema Award | Sean Mullin | Nominated | |
| Savannah Film Festival | 2014 | Best Feature Jury Award | Sean Mullin | Winner | |
| Napa Valley Film Festival | 2014 | Favorite Narrative Feature Audience Award | Sean Mullin | Winner | |
| Napa Valley Film Festival | 2014 | Best Narrative Feature Jury Award | Sean Mullin | Winner | |

== Release ==
The release was scheduled for early 2015. A limited theatrical release was planned, scheduled for January 30, 2015. A video on demand release was scheduled for the same day. In addition the film was to be available on home video and digital formats. Amira & Sam grossed $31,849 at the box office.

== Reception ==
Catsoulis wrote that the film is "more successful as a portrait of veteran alienation than as a romance."

Linden wrote that it is "a considerable feat" that the film "manages to be engaging and unforced for a good portion of its running time" and that the "low-key warmth" of the main actors is among the most positive elements of the film. She added that "Nothing feels truly at stake, no matter how weighty the risks the characters face".

O'Hehir stated that despite implausibilities in the film, its romance "worked on me, or at least it made me wish that the world of Sam and Amira’s wonderful and unlikely love affair really existed. It’s a better world than ours." O'Hehir added that even though the film had good intentions and any cultural mistakes "are exceptionally mild", "If enough people see this movie, it’s possible that Mullin will come under attack for eroticizing or exoticizing an Arab woman, and/or disrespecting Islam."

Schager gave the movie a "C" ranking, arguing that it was generic even though it had a cultural divide as a theme. Schager criticized the nature of Sam Seneca.

Ben Sachs of the Chicago Reader stated that the "message of tolerance" was "heavy-handed", the romance "unconvincing", and the financial subplot "feels totally misguided".

John DeFore of The Hollywood Reporter wrote that the romantic chemistry between Amira and Sam was "just right".

Alan Scherstuhl of the Village Voice wrote that the film had "implausibilities" but that the romance was overall "stellar".
