= Laith Nakli =

British-Syrian actor and producer (born 1969)

- Born: Laith Nakli; 1 December 1969 (age 56); Plymouth, Devon, England, United Kingdom
- Occupation: Actor

Laith Nakli (born 1 December 1969) is a British actor of Syrian descent best known for his role in the 2017 movie The Wall as the voice of the mythical sniper named Juba, the 2017 miniseries The Long Road Home, the 2018 movie 12 Strong as Commander Ahmed Lal, and the television series Ramy as Uncle Naseem.His parents are from Syria.

== Legal issues ==
In the 1990s, Nakli was a bodybuilder. In 1998, he was arrested, and two years later pled guilty to four counts of conspiracy to possess and distribute controlled substances. He subsequently retired from bodybuilding to pursue acting. U. S. Immigration and Customs Enforcement administratively closed the case against Nakli in 2013.

== Filmography ==
=== Film ===
Year	Title	Role	Notes
2007	You Belong to Me	Bo, the Mover	
2007	Arranged	Abdul-Halim Khaldi	
2011	I'm Not Me	Robert Benoit	
2011	My Last Day Without You	Mahdi	
2012	Recalled	First Sergeant Wells	
2013	A Song Still Inside	Edward Carrick	
2014	Amira & Sam	Bassam Jafari	He is also the associate producer of the movie.
2015	Devil’s Work	Lab Proctor	
2015	A Rising Tide	Jerry	
2017	The Wall	Juba	Voice only
2018	12 Strong	Commander Ahmed Lal	
2018	Bodega	Amir	Short film
2019	The Brawler	Martin	
2019	Saeed	Sami	Short film
2019	Swallow	Luay	
2020	Antarctica	Vlad	
2021	No Longer Suitable for Use	Samir	Short film
2022	Sweet Refuge	Hakim	Short film
2023	Problemista	Khalil	
2024	Push to Enter	Hugo Martin	Short film
2025	Lucky Lu	Markos	
2026	Your Mother Your Mother Your Mother	TBA	
TBA	She Gets It from Me	TBA	Post-production

=== Television ===
Year	Title	Role	Notes
2006	The Sopranos	Mr. Fahim Ulleh Khan	Episode: "Live Free or Die"
2015	Blindspot	Zahir	
2017	24: Legacy	Kusuma	
2017	The Long Road Home	Alim	7 episodes
2018	The Accidental Wolf	Zuhair	
2019	Orange Is the New Black	Youssef	Episode: "God Bless America"
2019–2020	Emergence	Yousef	2 episodes
2019–2022	Ramy	Uncle Naseem	26 episodes
2020–2021	Momo's Amerika	Jimmy	2 episodes
2021	Ten Year Old Tom	Fedir Jr. / Doorman / Kevork	Voice: 4 episodes
2022	Ms. Marvel	Sheikh Abdullah	3 episodes
2023	FBI	Ahmed Khan	Episode: "Sins of the Past"
2023	Kizazi Moto: Generation Fire	The Oracle (voice)	Episode: "Stardust"
2024	Bob's Burgers	Papou (voice)	Episode: "Colon-ly the Dronely"
