= 2006 MTV Movie Awards =

American film awards ceremony

- Date: Saturday, June 3, 2006
- Location: Sony Pictures Studios, Culver City, California
- Country: United States
- Hosted by: Jessica Alba

Television/radio coverage
- Network: MTV

The 2006 MTV Movie Awards aired on MTV on Saturday, June 3, 2006 from Sony Pictures Studios in Culver City, California, and were hosted by Jessica Alba, with it being broadcast on June 8. It featured performances by Christina Aguilera, AFI and Gnarls Barkley. In addition to the below awards, MTV gave lifetime achievement awards to Jim Carrey (The MTV Generation Award) and Spike Lee (The Silver Bucket of Excellence, for Do the Right Thing). MTV held its 15th annual movie awards show on Saturday, June 3, at the Sony Pictures Studios in Culver City, California. It was the final time Tenth Planet Productions produced the awards, and Joel Gallen was the executive-producer and director for the 12th and final consecutive year.

This is also the second MTV Movie Awards show to have a host win an award. The first show was in 2004 with Lindsay Lohan winning an award. The host for the MTV Movie Awards in 2006 was Jessica Alba. Christina Aguilera performed, for the first time, her lead single of her latest release Back to Basics, "Ain't No Other Man". Pre-recorded parodies include The Da Vinci Code, Mission: Impossible III, and King Kong.

== Performers ==
- AFI – "Miss Murder"
- Christina Aguilera – "Ain't No Other Man"
- Gnarls Barkley – "Crazy"

== Presenters ==
- Brandon Routh, Kate Bosworth, and Kevin Spacey – presented Best Hero
- Amanda Bynes and Anna Faris – presented Best Breakthrough Performance
- Colin Farrell and Jamie Foxx – presented Best Fight
- Justin Timberlake and Eva Mendes – presented Best Kiss
- Matt Dillon, Kate Hudson, and Owen Wilson – presented Best Villain
- Famke Janssen and Rebecca Romijn – presented Sexiest Performance
- Adam Sandler and Kate Beckinsale – presented Best Performance
- T.I. – introduced Christina Aguilera
- Will Ferrell as Ricky Bobby and John C. Reilly as Cal Naughton, Jr. – presented Best Comedic Performance
- LL Cool J – presented Silver Bucket of Excellence Award
- Keanu Reeves and Sandra Bullock – presented Best On-Screen Team
- Jessica Simpson and Dane Cook – introduced AFI
- Will Ferrell – presented MTV Generation Award
- Samuel L. Jackson – presented Best Movie

== Awards ==
Below are the list of nominations. Winners are listed first and highlighted in bold.

Best Movie
**Wedding Crashers**; The 40-Year-Old Virgin; Batman Begins; King Kong; Sin City
Best Performance	Breakthrough Performance
**Jake Gyllenhaal – Brokeback Mountain**; Joaquin Phoenix – Walk the Line; Rachel McAdams – Red Eye; Steve Carell – The 40-Year-Old Virgin; Terrence Howard – Hustle & Flow; Reese Witherspoon – Walk the Line	**Isla Fisher – Wedding Crashers**; André 3000 – Four Brothers; Jennifer Carpenter – The Exorcism of Emily Rose; Nelly - The Longest Yard; Romany Malco – The 40-Year-Old Virgin; Taraji P. Henson – Hustle & Flow
Best On-Screen Team	Best Villain
**The Wedding Crashers – Wedding Crashers**; Ron, Hermione and Harry Potter – Harry Potter and the Goblet of Fire; The Dukes Of Hazard – The Dukes of Hazzard; The Smart Tech Guys – The 40-Year-Old Virgin; The Fantastic Four – Fantastic Four	**Hayden Christensen - Star Wars: Episode III – Revenge of the Sith**; Cillian Murphy – Batman Begins; Ralph Fiennes – Harry Potter and the Goblet of Fire; Tilda Swinton – The Chronicles of Narnia: The Lion, the Witch and the Wardrobe; Tobin Bell – Saw II
Best Comedic Performance	Best Frightened Performance
**Steve Carell – The 40-Year-Old Virgin**; Owen Wilson – Wedding Crashers; Adam Sandler – The Longest Yard; Tyler Perry – Madea's Family Reunion; Vince Vaughn – Wedding Crashers	**Jennifer Carpenter – The Exorcism of Emily Rose**; Rachel Nichols – The Amityville Horror; Derek Richardson – Hostel; Paris Hilton – House of Wax; Dakota Fanning – War of the Worlds
Best Hero	Sexiest Performance
**Christian Bale – Batman Begins**; Jessica Alba – Fantastic Four; Daniel Radcliffe – Harry Potter and the Goblet of Fire; Kate Beckinsale – Underworld: Evolution; Ewan McGregor – Star Wars: Episode III – Revenge of the Sith	**Jessica Alba – Sin City**; Beyoncé – The Pink Panther; Jessica Simpson – The Dukes of Hazzard; Zhang Ziyi – Memoirs of a Geisha; Rob Schneider – Deuce Bigalow: European Gigolo
Best Kiss	Best Fight
**Jake Gyllenhaal and Heath Ledger – Brokeback Mountain**; Taraji P. Henson & Terrence Howard – Hustle & Flow; Anna Faris and Chris Marquette – Just Friends; Angelina Jolie and Brad Pitt – Mr. & Mrs. Smith; Rosario Dawson and Clive Owen – Sin City	**Brad Pitt vs. Angelina Jolie – Mr. and Mrs. Smith**; Kong vs. The Planes – King Kong; Stephen Chow vs. Axe Gang – Kung Fu Hustle; Ewan McGregor vs. Hayden Christensen – Star Wars: Episode III – Revenge of the Sith
mtvU Student Filmmaker Award
**Joshua Caldwell – A Beautiful Lie (from Fordham University)**; Sean Mullin – Sadiq (from Columbia University); Stephen Reedy – Undercut (from Diablo Valley College); Jarrett Slavin – The Spiral Project (from University of Michigan); Landon Zakheim – The Fabulous Felix McCabe (from Emerson College)

=== MTV Generation Award ===
- **Jim Carrey**

=== Silver Bucket of Excellence ===
- **Do the Right Thing**
