= The Fleshy Part of the Thigh =

- The Sopranos episode
- Episode no.: Season 6 Episode 4
- Directed by: Alan Taylor
- Written by: Diane Frolov; Andrew Schneider
- Cinematography by: Alik Sakharov
- Production code: 604
- Original air date: April 2, 2006
- Running time: 57 minutes

Episode chronology
← Previous "Mayham"	Next → "Mr. & Mrs. John Sacrimoni Request..."
- The Sopranos season 6

"The Fleshy Part of the Thigh" is the 69th episode of the HBO original series, The Sopranos, and the fourth of the show's sixth season. Written by Diane Frolov and Andrew Schneider, and directed by Alan Taylor, it originally aired on April 2, 2006.

== Starring ==
- James Gandolfini as Tony Soprano
- Lorraine Bracco as Dr. Jennifer Melfi *
- Edie Falco as Carmela Soprano
- Michael Imperioli as Christopher Moltisanti
- Dominic Chianese as Corrado Soprano, Jr. *
- Steven Van Zandt as Silvio Dante
- Tony Sirico as Paulie Gualtieri
- Robert Iler as Anthony Soprano, Jr.
- Jamie-Lynn Sigler as Meadow Soprano
- Aida Turturro as Janice Soprano Baccalieri
- Steven R. Schirripa as Bobby Baccalieri
- Vincent Curatola as Johnny "Sack" Sacrimoni
- Frank Vincent as Phil Leotardo
- Joseph R. Gannascoli as Vito Spatafore
- Dan Grimaldi as Patsy Parisi

* = credit only

=== Guest starring ===
- Jerry Adler as Hesh Rabkin

==== Also guest starring ====
- Max Casella as Benny Fazio
- Carl Capotorto as Little Paulie Germani
- John "Cha Cha" Ciarcia as Albie Cianflone
- Rob Devaney as Pastor Bob Brewster
- Chris Diamantopoulos as Jason Barone
- Frances Ensemplare as Nucci Gualtieri
- Hal Holbrook as John Schwinn
- Lord Jamar as Da Lux
- Will Janowitz as Finn DeTrolio
- Angela Pietropinto as Helen Barone
- Turk Pipkin as Aaron Arkaway
- Anthony "Treach" Criss as Marvin
- MuMs da Schemer as Mop
- Paul Schulze as Father Phil Intintola
- Judith Malina as Aunt Dottie
- Ron Leibman as Lior Plepler
- Gina Tognoni as Catherine Lipman
- Sandra Daley as Fiona Macken
- Michael DeNigris as Charles Cinelli
- Ash Roeca as Rudy Diaz
- Alberto Vazquez as Julian
- Gustavo Cunha as Armando
- Chazz Menendez as Goon
- Tracey Silver as Beth Kaplan
- James Vincent Romano as Cary DiBartolo
- Marcos Muniz as Ramon

== Synopsis ==
Tony's condition improves as he awaits final surgery, and his temperament seems softer. When Aaron Arkaway and Pastor Bob Brewster, an evangelical minister, visit him, he joins them in prayer. He spends his remaining days at the hospital interacting with two patients, research scientist John Schwinn and rapper Da Lux, who has been shot seven times. Da Lux invites Tony to watch a boxing match in his hospital room. Paulie is there and laments that everyone is alone, like the boxers; Schwinn argues, "Nothing is separate; everything is connected." Tony confides to Schwinn that he is starting to believe they are all part of something bigger.

Bobby talks to Marvin, a member of Da Lux's entourage. Da Lux's injuries, it is believed, will help his career by giving him a huge boost in "street cred," while Marvin is struggling for fame as a musician. Bobby proposes to Marvin that he jump-start his career by shooting him in the "fleshy part of the thigh." The fee agreed is $8,000; Marvin only pays $7,000, which Bobby reluctantly accepts. He then shoots Marvin in the buttocks.

On her deathbed, Paulie's aunt Dottie, a nun, confesses to him that during World War II she had an affair with a soldier and gave birth to a child, Paulie himself. Nucci, who he knows as his mother, is really his aunt. Devastated by the news and questioning his own identity, Paulie struggles to remain focused at work. After Dottie's funeral, which he does not attend, Paulie tells Nucci she is no longer part of his life. When Paulie confides in Tony, he urges him to reconcile with Nucci, reminding him that she brought him up and loved him, and has bailed him out many times.

Tony confronts the paramedic who checked his wallet and accuses him of stealing $2,000. The man denies it, but Christopher and others threaten him if he fails to repay the money. Following Dick Barone's death, his son Jason has taken over the family sanitation business and is trying to sell it, not knowing it is the Soprano family's front. Though ordered not to go ahead, he is too far along to back out. The company trying to buy Barone's routes is associated with Johnny. Tony finally accepts an offer from him and allows the sale to go through. Tony also promises Jason's mother that no harm will come to her son. The pleading of a mother for her son drives Paulie to leave the hospital room in tears.

As Tony leaves the hospital, the paramedic approaches with an envelope of cash; he does not take it. As he is wheeled outside, Tony takes a few moments to observe the bustle of life. He grabs Janice's hand and comments that "every day is a gift" to him now. On a riverbank, Paulie finds Jason getting ready to go rowing. He viciously beats him with a metal pole and demands a monthly cut from him equal to the cost of Nucci's retirement home expenses. Brandishing a gun, he warns him not to say a word to Tony.

== First appearances ==
- Albie Cianflone: Phil Leotardo's consigliere who, together with Phil, attends a meeting regarding Barone Sanitation with Tony and Paulie outside the hospital.

== Final appearance ==
- Father Phil Intintola: Local Catholic priest and friend of Carmela's.

== Deceased ==
- Aunt Dottie: Paulie's biological mother, who dies of natural causes.

== Production ==
This is the first episode written by Diane Frolov and Andrew Schneider who joined the series' writing staff for the final season and also acted as supervising producers on it. They would write three more episodes. Frolov and Schneider previously collaborated with David Chase on Northern Exposure.

According to Steve Schirripa (Bobby Baccalieri), the rapper Fabolous originally played the role of Marvin; his scenes were later reshot with Treach in his place.

== Other cultural references ==
- When Aaron pays a visit to Tony in his ICU room, accompanied by Pastor Bob, he is wearing a shirt bearing the name of Terri Schiavo, a Florida woman who, being in a persistent vegetative state, was a center of controversy in the late-1990s and early-2000s (decade), in regards to sustaining her life through artificial means.
- While having his wound dressed the day before surgery, Tony speculates that Janice is responsible for taping the Ojibwe saying introduced in "Mayham," "Sometimes I go about in pity for myself, and all the while, a great wind carries me across the sky," to his wall.
- Carmela saw a book about Sink the Bismarck! but half the pages were missing.
- After learning that Pastor Bob and his followers oppose female contraception, Tony asks them if their God disapproves of Viagra too.
- Tony's surgeon jokes to the surgical team that he found Jimmy Hoffa in Tony's abdomen.
- Tony tells the insurance agent his doctors look like the United Colors of Benetton.
- After moving to a regular hospital room after his surgery, Tony is watching the 1970s television series Kung Fu.
- In Da Lux's hospital room, members of his crew tell Da Lux that he "only got two less shots than Fifty," a reference to rapper 50 Cent, who survived 9 gunshot wounds in 2000.
- Pastor Bob presents Tony with a copy of the book Born Again by Charles Colson, a key figure in the Watergate scandal who would later become a born again Christian while in prison.
- In addition, when Pastor Bob sees that Tony was reading a DK book on dinosaurs, he mentions that the Earth was created by God 6,000 years ago, and not by the nebular hypothesis over billions of years—this is a reference to the belief in Young Earth creationism. Tony compares this to The Flintstones, while Christopher does not believe Adam and Eve's paradise could have included T-Rexes.
- Beth Kaplan says she has nothing against evangelical Christians as they revere Israel as the Holy Land.
- Tony reminds Jason Barone that Tony, Jason's father, and Paulie had taken Jason to watch the New York Mets, Mookie Wilson and Dave Kingman, play at Shea Stadium.
- The character John Schwinn was a scientist for Bell Labs, which built the first active telecommunications satellite, Telstar. While watching the fight on a satellite television system, the signal breaks up and, at one point, Paulie asks him to fix the reception.
- The character John Schwinn is played by actor Hal Holbrook, who famously interpreted Deep Throat in All the President's Men. At the end of the episode, Tony learns that Schwinn's larynx was removed.
- During the scene in the hospital as Tony and Paulie watch the fight, Schwinn makes a comment about everything being related to which Da Lux responds "Everything is everything, I can dig that." The actor playing Da Lux is Lord Jamar from the rap group Brand Nubian. Brand Nubian's third album is titled Everything Is Everything.
- Marvin bets on Pinnacle Sports.
- Tony mentions the Hurricane Katrina victims as an example of injustice.
- Bobby mentions a "Dr. Droop" to Marvin, a malapropism of Dr. Dre and Snoop Dogg. He also mistakenly calls Da Lux, "Ex-Lax," a brand-name laxative.
- When Paulie pays Nucci a visit at her retirement community room, scenes from a Gilmore Girls episode can be seen on the TV in the background.
- The paramedic says "I was only doing my job," which Tony compares to the Nuremberg defense.
- The scene where Bobby shoots Marvin in the buttocks can be a reference to the scene in Training Day where Officer Jake Hoyt (Ethan Hawke) shoots the film's main character and antagonist Det. Alonzo Harris (Denzel Washington) in the buttocks.
- After talking about tornadoes, Tony greets John Schwinn as "Mr. Wizard," a reference to Watch Mr. Wizard.

== Music ==
- The song that plays as Jason Barone is sculling and Paulie and Patsy come to meet him is the first verse of "The Three Bells" by The Browns. The song would be used again in the next episode, "Mr. & Mrs. John Sacrimoni Request..."
- The song that Tony plays on the stereo while meeting with Phil is "Foreplay/Long Time" by Boston.
- The song playing during the end credits is a condensed version of "One of These Days" by Pink Floyd.

== Reception ==
The episode had 8.83 million viewers on its premiere, with a Nielsen rating of 3.9 and share of 9 among viewers aged 18 to 49, marking the third straight episode with declining ratings.

Television Without Pity graded the episode with a B+. For The Star-Ledger, Alan Sepinwall observed that Paulie's response to learning about his real mother showed "the same woe-is-me, the-world-owes-me-some-ice-cream-cake attitude he displays under even the best of circumstances".
