= The Wall (2017 film) =

2017 film by Doug Liman

- Theatrical release poster
- Directed by: Doug Liman
- Written by: Dwain Worrell
- Produced by: Dave Bartis
- Starring: Aaron Taylor-Johnson; John Cena
- Cinematography: Roman Vasyanov
- Edited by: Julia Bloch
- Production company: Hypnotic
- Distributed by: Roadside Attractions; Amazon Studios
- Release date: May 12, 2017 (United States)
- Running time: 88 minutes
- Country: United States
- Language: English
- Budget: $3 million
- Box office: $4.5 million

The Wall is a 2017 American war thriller film directed by Doug Liman and written by Dwain Worrell. The film follows two American soldiers (Aaron Taylor-Johnson and John Cena) trapped by an Iraqi sniper. Produced by Amazon Studios, it was released on May 12, 2017, by Roadside Attractions. The film received mixed reviews from critics and audiences and grossed $4.5 million against a $3 million budget.

== Plot ==
At the close of the Iraq War, U.S. Army Staff Sergeant Shane Matthews, a sniper, along with his spotter, Sergeant Allen Isaac, are sent to investigate a pipeline construction site in the Iraqi desert where contractors and their security detail have all fallen victim to a sniper.

The pair patiently wait 22 hours on overwatch before determining that the site is clear. Matthews proceeds to investigate the site, but is shot by a famed Iraqi sniper nicknamed "Juba". Isaac tries to rescue the dying Matthews, but he is also wounded in the right knee and has his radio damaged and his water bottle destroyed in the process.

Alone, Isaac takes cover behind an unsteady wall and tends to his wounds. The sniper has a radio tuned into the American channel, and uses it to communicate with Isaac initially under the pretense of being a high ranking allied soldier at another site. The deception allows the sniper to get other useful information from Isaac. Throughout their various one-sided attempts at conversation, we learn that the sniper does not claim to be the mythical Juba mentioned earlier in the film, a nom de guerre for various Iraqi Insurgent snipers notorious for filming their attacks on American soldiers.

Matthews regains consciousness and subtly gets Isaac's attention that he is still alive. Matthews slowly crawls towards his rifle in the midst of the dusty wind while Isaac distracts Juba with small talk. Matthews believes that the sniper is hiding at the top of some rubble nearby and fires in that direction. The dusty wind settles quickly. The sniper sees Matthews and fires, injuring Matthews in the left shoulder as he crawled towards the wall, and kills him with a second shot.

Isaac's attempts to call headquarters for help are stymied by the loss of his radio antenna. He attempts to repair this with one from a dead contractor's radio, only to discern that the sniper had used the earlier response team as a ruse to call for help and lure another response force into his jaws.

Isaac hears the rescue helicopters coming, so he pushes down the wall and uses Matthews' rifle to try to kill Juba, or at least flush him out so the rescue chopper can see the trap. Juba fires at Isaac twice and misses. Isaac now has the sniper's location and fires his only round. Isaac stands up and waits for Juba's next shot, but it never comes. Thus he assumes his shot was successful, and Juba is either injured or dead. The helicopters then land and the rescue team picks up Isaac and Matthews. Once the helicopters take off, Juba shoots down both in rapid succession. He is then heard over the radio, calling for another rescue to set a new trap.

== Cast ==
- Aaron Taylor-Johnson as Sergeant Allen "Ize" Isaac
- John Cena as Staff Sergeant Shane Matthews
- Laith Nakli as Juba (voice)

== Production ==
On November 12, 2014, it was announced that Amazon Studios had bought its first ever original spec script by Dwain Worrell, about an American sharpshooter trapped behind a wall by an Iraqi sniper. Worrell wrote his screenplay while teaching English in China. Worrell drew from his background as a playwright to flesh out the second act of the screenplay, which focuses on Isaac's conversation with the sniper. Worrell said, "What interested me about it was the simple conversation between two people. That could almost be had on a New York City park bench with two guys playing chess. There is that sort of dynamic between the characters in the film." The script appeared in the 2014 Black List of most liked un-produced screenplays.

On March 29, 2016, it was reported that Doug Liman had been hired to direct the psychological thriller. Glen Basner's FilmNation Entertainment handled the film's international sales at the 2016 Cannes Film Festival, allowing for a theatrical release.

On May 9, 2016, Variety confirmed that Aaron Taylor-Johnson had joined the film's cast to play Isaac, the junior American soldier. On November 29, it was reported that Amazon had partnered with Roadside Attractions to distribute the film, which would also star John Cena, and the film would now follow two American soldiers. Amazon produced the film along with Big Indie Pictures, and Picrow, and Dave Bartis.

Principal photography on the film ended in November 2016 with a release of first look image. US Ranger sniper Nicholas Irving was an on-set adviser for the film.

== Release ==
=== Theatrical ===
The Wall was scheduled to be released on March 10, 2017, by Roadside Attractions but was pushed back to May 12, 2017.

== Reception ==
=== Critical response ===
On review aggregator website Rotten Tomatoes, the film has an approval rating of 65% based on 125 reviews, with an average rating of 6/10. The site's critical consensus reads, "The Wall makes the most of its limitations -- albeit perhaps not quite enough to stretch its tight-focused action into a consistently gripping feature-length thriller." On Metacritic, the film has a score 56 out of 100, based 26 critics, indicating "mixed or average reviews". Common Sense Media has given a rating of 4/5, while the Washington Post has given a rating of 3/4.
