= Live Free or Die (The Sopranos) =

- The Sopranos episode
- Episode no.: Season 6 Episode 6
- Directed by: Tim Van Patten
- Written by: David Chase; Terence Winter; Robin Green; Mitchell Burgess
- Cinematography by: Alik Sakharov
- Production code: 606
- Original air date: April 16, 2006
- Running time: 55 minutes

Episode chronology
← Previous "Mr. & Mrs. John Sacrimoni Request..."	Next → "Luxury Lounge"
- The Sopranos season 6

"Live Free or Die" is the 71st episode of the HBO original series The Sopranos and the sixth of the show's sixth season. Written by David Chase, Terence Winter, Robin Green, and Mitchell Burgess, and directed by Tim Van Patten, it originally aired on April 16, 2006.

== Starring ==
- James Gandolfini as Tony Soprano
- Lorraine Bracco as Dr. Jennifer Melfi
- Edie Falco as Carmela Soprano
- Michael Imperioli as Christopher Moltisanti
- Dominic Chianese as Corrado Soprano, Jr. *
- Steven Van Zandt as Silvio Dante
- Tony Sirico as Paulie Gualtieri
- Robert Iler as Anthony Soprano, Jr.
- Jamie-Lynn Sigler as Meadow Soprano
- Aida Turturro as Janice Soprano Baccalieri *
- Steven R. Schirripa as Bobby Baccalieri
- Frank Vincent as Phil Leotardo
- John Ventimiglia as Artie Bucco
- Joseph R. Gannascoli as Vito Spatafore
- Dan Grimaldi as Patsy Parisi
- Toni Kalem as Angie Bonpensiero
- Sharon Angela as Rosalie Aprile

* = credit only

=== Guest starring ===
- Tom Aldredge as Hugh De Angelis
- Edoardo Ballerini as Corky Caporale
- Elizabeth Bracco as Marie Spatafore
- Max Casella as Benny Fazio
- Will Janowitz as Finn DeTrolio
- Arthur Nascarella as Carlo Gervasi
- Anthony Ribustello as Dante Greco
- Suzanne Shepherd as Mary De Angelis
- Lenny Venito as James "Murmur" Zancone
- Maureen Van Zandt as Gabriella Dante
- Louis Gross as Perry Annunziata
- John Costelloe as Jim Witowski
- Selenis Leyva as Jill Dibiaso
- Danny Mastrogiorgio as Kevin Mucci
- Susan Blommaert as Betty Wolf
- Ray Anthony Thomas as Flagman
- Donna Villella as Rae 'Rafaella' Martino
- Adam Trese as Michael Kardish
- Jacqueline Antaramian as Mrs. Fahim Ulleh Khan
- Afeefa Ayube as Afaf Khan
- Laith Nakli as Mr. Fahim Ulleh Khan
- Ron Castellano as Terry Doria
- Amanda Magnavita as Babysitter
- Michael Malone as Antique Store Owner
- Frank Borrelli as Vito Spatafore, Jr.
- Paulina Gerzon as Francesca Spatafore
- James Hindman as Carty
- Leo Daignault as Don
- Julia Montgomery Brown as Waspy Housewife
- Robert Feeley as Rehab Patient
- Cal Crenshaw as Local Man

== Synopsis ==
Christopher reports to Tony and his crew that Vito has been spotted in a gay club. Meadow reveals to Carmela that Finn witnessed Vito performing oral sex on a security guard. As a result, Finn is taken by Tony to the back room of Satriale's where, very frightened, he is made to repeat the story for the crew. The main reaction is disgust and anger; Carlo says "He's Gotta Go".

Tony, despite everything, is hesitant to kill Vito. As he tells Dr. Melfi, he abhors homosexuality, and is “a strict Catholic”; but he doesn’t mind what happens between consenting adults, and he cares about Vito as a friend and an earner. "I had a second chance,” he says. “Why shouldn't he?"

Benny, Dante Greco and Terry Doria visit Vito and his mistress at a beach house on the Jersey Shore, where he's been lying low. They try to escort him to see Tony, but he speeds away. Vito returns home later that night, kisses his sleeping children, packs some keepsakes, necessities, and cash, and drives off into a stormy night. After his car hits a downed tree branch, he proceeds on foot and finds himself stranded in a small town in New Hampshire. Exhausted, he checks into an inn. Vito has cousins in New Hampshire but cannot find them. He stays in the pleasant town, comfortable in its friendly, open-minded ambiance. He befrends Jim Witowski, the owner of a local diner.

After Tony and Silvio are unable to reach Vito, Carlo is promoted to take over Vito's construction business in addition to the ports. He's delighted, but reasserts the general sentiment among all of Tony's crew that Vito needs to be found "and put down for the honor of the family." Angrily, Tony responds with "it's not their decision to make" and "Let's face it. We all know Vito isn't the first."

Meadow starts an internship at a law firm handling white collar crimes, although she is also working as a volunteer in a law center. In an argumentative conversation with Finn, she contrasts the soft treatment of white-collar criminals with the harsh treatment of others, for example, the humiliation of Johnny at his daughter's wedding. Finn challenges her values and notes her hypocrisy: Tony's crew is going to punish Vito for his sexual orientation. Meadow storms out.

Carmela is still pressuring Tony to get permission from the building inspector to move forward with her spec house, which he seems to keep forgetting. She is appalled to find that Hugh has been selling materials salvaged from the construction site. Carmela also discovers that Angie Bonpensiero has secretly branched out into business with members of the crime family, putting money up for street loans and buying stolen car parts.

Tony informs Chris that two Italian hitmen will be sent over to the U.S. to kill Rusty, and tells him to hire a "third party" to equip them with weapons and act as an intermediary between the assassins and the Soprano family. Chris gives the task to Corky Caporale, a Soprano family associate who speaks Italian, and pays him in heroin.

== First appearances ==
- Corky Caporale: A DiMeo crime family associate and heroin addict who speaks fluent Italian. He is tasked with serving as the "third party" intermediary between Christopher Moltisanti and the Italian hitmen coming to murder Rusty Millio.
- Jim Witowski: Owner of a local diner at Dartford, New Hampshire, the town where Vito has taken refuge.

== Title reference ==
- The episode's title, "Live Free or Die," refers to the New Hampshire state motto, which Vito notices on a license plate while he is browsing an antique shop. It is juxtaposed with Vito's options: Live free (stay in New Hampshire) or die (return to New Jersey).

== Production ==
Night Club scene filmed at Big Al's Redzone in Queens.

- Sharon Angela (Rosalie Aprile) is promoted to the main cast and now billed in the opening credits for the episodes in which she appears, with some exceptions.
- "Live Free or Die" is the final episode written by the married writing team of Robin Green and Mitchell Burgess. They left the series, which they had been with since the first season, to produce a new project for HBO, which never took shape. This is also one of only three episodes in the entire series where four writers share credit for the script, the others being "Calling All Cars" of Season 4 and Season 6 Part II premiere "Soprano Home Movies."
- The scenes filmed for the fictional town of Dartford, New Hampshire were actually filmed in Boonton, New Jersey.
- The highway Vito was traveling on when his car broke down, New Hampshire Route 228, is also fictitious.

== Music ==
- The song playing in the background of the scene at the Bada Bing! during the meeting discussing Vito's sighting at a gay bar is Rock & Roll Queen by The Subways.
- The song playing on the radio in the New Hampshire diner where Vito eats his breakfast is "Let the Teardrops Fall", performed by Patsy Cline.
- After Meadow tells Carmela and Rosalie Aprile about Vito and the security guard, Tony comes down the stairs singing the opening line of "Aqualung" by Jethro Tull.
- The songs playing in the background of the scene at the Bada Bing! when Tony promotes Carlo are "Loops of Fury" by The Chemical Brothers and "After" by Wide Open Cage.
- The song played during the end credits is "4th of July" by X.

== Reception ==
This episode led Nielsen ratings for U.S. cable TV for the week of April 10 to 16, with a 4.8 rating and 7.94 million viewers.

Television Without Pity graded the episode with an A−. For The Star-Ledger, Alan Sepinwall praised the episode for "defying expectations", especially with Vito fleeing to New Hampshire.

Tony Soprano's line mentioning Jennifer Beals during a discussion about homosexuality was in reference to The L Word, a show on HBO competitor Showtime, whose president Robert Greenblatt responded: "It doesn't surprise me at all that Tony Soprano would have a warm place in his heart for the girls of 'The L Word.' It's nice to know that 'bada bing' doesn't discriminate." In May 2006, Paul Brownfield of the Los Angeles Times named this episode as an example of a "gay mafia" influencing Hollywood programming, "literally and to its most logical extreme".
