= Allegiance (film) =

- Directed by: Michael Connors
- Written by: Michael Connors
- Produced by: Daryl Freimark; Sean Mullin
- Starring: Seth Gabel; Shad "Bow Wow" Moss; Pablo Schreiber; Malik Yoba; Dominic Fumusa; Aidan Quinn
- Cinematography: Daniel Vecchione
- Edited by: Jonathan Schwarz
- Music by: Jeffrey Fayman; Yoav Goren; John Samuel Hanson; Immediate
- Production companies: Five By Eight Productions; Hardball Entertainment
- Distributed by: XLrator Media; Anderson Digital
- Release date: June 12, 2012 (Seattle International Film Festival)
- Running time: 90 minutes
- Country: United States
- Language: English

Allegiance, also known as Recalled, is a 2012 American war film directed by Michael Connors and starring Bow Wow. Allegiance takes place in October 2004 and concerns the upcoming deployment of a New York Army National Guard unit to Iraq.

== Plot ==
In October 2004, a New York Army National Guard unit prepares for an upcoming deployment to Iraq. First Lieutenant Danny Selfton, the executive officer of his company, was transferred to a non-deploying public affairs unit due to influence from his politically powerful father but is present to assist in the final preparations. Specialist Reyes, a combat medic in the same unit, applied for a compassionate reassignment due to his son suffering from lung cancer. However, his request for reassignment was denied by his battalion commander Lieutenant Colonel Owens due to his needed medical skills for the upcoming deployment.

Not willing to leave his son, Reyes attempts to flee the base prior to his unit shipping out. Unable to do it alone, he pressures Selfton into helping him come up with a plan to sneak out on a departing supply convoy. Selfton's plans are hindered by his replacement, First Lieutenant Chambers, due to Chambers accompanying him to the convoy and Reyes' platoon sergeant Staff Sergeant Hart discovering that he was missing. Selfton and Reyes flee from the convoy area and attempt to find another way to get him off of the base. Shortly after they flee Selfton is caught and arrested by the military police on base while trying to contact Reyes' cousin on a pay phone.

Captain Angelo, the company commander, orders Selfton to reveal Reyes' location. Selfton takes him to where he is located but a distraction by one of the other Soldiers in the unit gives Selfton a chance to get away and meet back up with Reyes. Selfton takes Reyes to meet up with his cousin and causes a distraction allowing Reyes to successfully flee the area. During his escape Chambers attacks Selfton and the two officers fight until the MPs arrive and arrest him again. Reyes climbs the fence leading off of the base and successfully flees with his cousin before he can be captured.

The following day Selfton is taken in front of the company in handcuffs so he can face charges. At the same time, a military police car arrives with Reyes, who was arrested earlier while with his son. Selfton is brought to LTC Owens' office but Owens drops all charges out of fear that Sefton's arrest for helping Reyes see his son would bring bad press to the National Guard. Before being dismissed, Selfton requests to stay with the unit and deploy with them, allowing Chambers to be discharged. His request granted, Selfton says goodbye to his fiancee Leela and then joins members of his unit on the back of one of the departing trucks.

== Cast ==
- Seth Gabel as Lieutenant Danny Selfton
- Shad "Bow Wow" Moss as Specialist Reyes
- Pablo Schreiber as First Lieutenant Alec Chambers
- Malik Yoba as Staff Sergeant Hart
- Dominic Fumusa as Captain Angelo
- Aidan Quinn as Lieutenant Colonel Owens
- Jason Lew as Sergeant Kraft
- Zachary Booth as Private Carroll
- Gavin-Keith Umeh as Private First Class Gonzales
- Laith Nakli as First Sergeant Wells
- Reshma Shetty as Leela
- Christopher L. McAllister as Dishelved Sergeant
- Greg Prosser as Radio Sergeant
- Ray Lucas as Barracks MP Sergeant
- Alexander Martin Jones as Barracks MP Private
