= The Ultimate Sniper =

1993 non-fiction book by John Plaster

The Ultimate Sniper: An Advanced Training Manual for Military and Police Snipers
- 1st edition cover
- Author: John Plaster
- Language: English
- Genre: Non-fiction
- Published: 1993
- Publisher: Paladin Press
- Pages: 584
- ISBN: 0-87364-704-1

The Ultimate Sniper: An Advanced Training Manual for Military and Police Snipers is a non-fiction book written by John Plaster and published in 1993. An expanded and updated version was published in 2006.

== Background ==
Plaster, a retired U.S. Army major, wrote his book after three tours in the Vietnam War, where he worked behind enemy lines in Laos and Cambodia as part of the Studies and Observation Group.

== Overview ==
Also included in the book is some history on sniping, including background on the British Army's first sniper unit, the Scottish Highland Lovat Scouts. These scouts fought in the Second Boer War.

== Legacy ==
The book came under the spotlight in October 2006 when a video about "Juba the sniper", who allegedly killed more than 20 U.S. soldiers in Iraq, mentioned it as an inspiration.
