= John Plaster =

Recipient of the Purple Heart medal

John L. Plaster
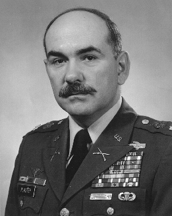
- Born: 1949 (age 76–77)
- Military career
- Allegiance: United States of America
- Branch: United States Army
- Service years: 1967–1971
- Rank: Major
- Nickname: "Plastic Man"
- Units: 5th Special Forces Group; MACV-SOG: RT New Mexico
- Conflicts: Vietnam War
- Awards: Bronze Star Medal Purple Heart; Meritorious Service Medal; Air Medal; Army Commendation Medal; Presidential Unit Citation; Good Conduct Medal National Defense Service Medal; Vietnam Service Medal; Republic of Vietnam Campaign Medal; Combat Infantryman Badge
- Other work: Gunsite Training Center, Paulden, Arizona

Signature
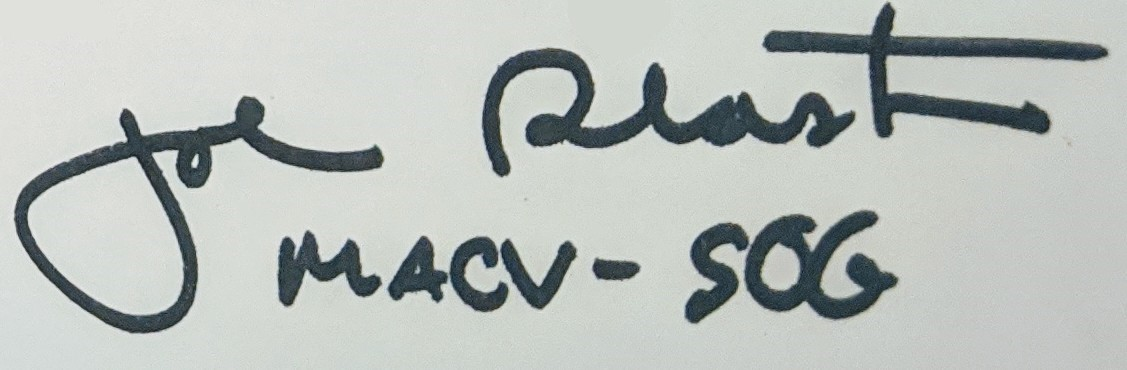

John L. Plaster (born 1949) is a former United States Army Special Forces officer regarded as one of the leading sniper experts in the world. A decorated Vietnam War veteran who served in the covert Studies and Observations Group (SOG), Plaster co-founded a renowned sniper school that trains military and law enforcement personnel in highly specialized sniper tactics. He is the author of The Ultimate Sniper: An Advanced Training Manual for Military and Police Snipers, The History of Sniping and Sharpshooting, and Secret Commandos: Behind Enemy Lines with the Elite Warriors of SOG, a memoir of his 3 years of service with SOG.

== Early life and education ==
Plaster graduated from high school in 1967 and holds a BA in Journalism from the University of Minnesota. He was trained as a communications sergeant in the U.S. Army Special Forces.

== Career ==
Plaster was initially assigned to 5th Special Forces Group and served three combat tours in the Vietnam War as a member of MACVSOG beginning in October 1968, leading intelligence-gathering and recon teams in North Vietnamese Army-controlled areas of Laos and Cambodia and along the Ho Chi Minh Trail. He was wounded once, and decorated four times, eventually receiving a field commission in recognition of his combat experience. Plaster's final tour with MACVSOG ended in November 1971. He retired from the military at the rank of Major.

Plaster parlayed his military experience into becoming a sniping instructor to members of many U.S. governmental agencies such as the Federal Bureau of Investigation, the United States Customs Service, the United States Marshals, Navy SEALs, and United States Marine Corps. Foreign units that have attended the school include the Royal Canadian Mounted Police and the Spanish Foreign Legion.

Since 1993, Plaster has been a precision rifle instructor at the Gunsite Training Center in Paulden, Arizona. He was recently Chief of Competition for Autauga Arms' U.S. and European sniping championships.

Plaster's experiences serve as part of the basis for the video game Call of Duty: Black Ops; he assisted the game's developers in developing the game by providing his wartime experiences to them.

He wrote a script with John Milius about the Son Tay Raid that as of 2025 has not been filmed.

== Awards and decorations ==
- Bronze Star Medal
- Purple Heart
- Meritorious Service Medal
- Air Medal
- Army Commendation Medal
- Presidential Unit Citation
- Good Conduct Medal
- National Defense Service Medal
- Vietnam Service Medal
- Republic of Vietnam Campaign Medal
- Combat Infantryman Badge

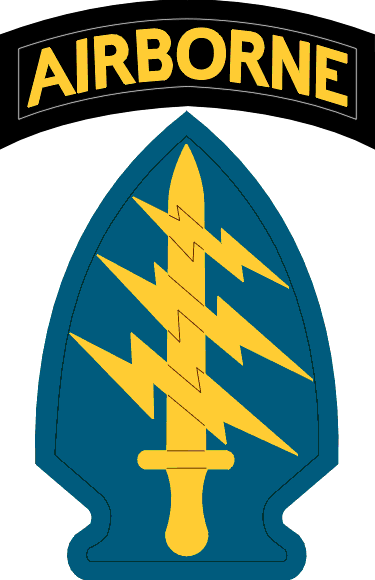

== Published writings ==
=== Books ===
- The Ultimate Sniper: An Advanced Training Manual for Military and Police Snipers (1993). Paladin Press. ISBN 978-0-87364-704-5
- Plaster, John L. (2000). SOG: A Photo History of the Secret Wars. Boulder, CO: Paladin Press. ISBN 978-1581600582. OCLC 445847740.
- Secret Commandos: Behind Enemy Lines with the Elite Warriors of SOG (2004). Simon & Schuster. ISBN 978-0684856735
- The History of Sniping and Sharpshooting (2008). Paladin Press. ISBN 9781581606324
- Sharpshooting in the Civil War (2009). Paladin Press. ISBN 978-1581607031
- SOG: The Secret Wars of America's Commandos in Vietnam (1998). Onyx. ISBN 978-0451195081
- Sniping in the Trenches: World War I and the Birth of Modern Sniping (2017). Paladin Press. ISBN 978-1610049023
- SOG The Secret wars of American Commandoes on Vietnam. Caliber press 1997

=== Journals ===
- The FBI Law Enforcement Bulletin
- Soldier of Fortune
- American Legion Magazine
- Guns & Ammo
