= List of films with post-credits scenes (2020s) =

Many films have featured mid- and post-credits scenes. Such scenes often include comedic gags, plot revelations, outtakes, or hints about sequels.

== 2020s ==
Year	Title	Description of scene(s)
2020	Bad Boys for Life	Before the credits scroll, Mike speaks to his son in prison and offers him a way to work off some of his debt to society.; Later in the credits there's another scene with Marcus on the plane asking another passenger if he would have sex with a witch without a condom. The passenger replies he would not. Marcus told Mike he would not.
2020	The Gentlemen	In a mid-credits scene, "Boxes of Bush" is sung.
2020	The Grudge	The credits roll over a silent shot of Muldoon's home; the same home where the Spencers died, and now a new extension of the curse.
2020	Dolittle	In a mid-credits scene, Müdfly, who is still alive from his fall, tries to talk with some bats but they attack him instead.
2020	The Turning	The end credits sequence shows Kate's hand dragging across the walls as the credits roll. Halfway through, it cuts to blue figures dancing.
2020	Big Brother	In the credits, Sachi repairs the old car as he reunites with his family.
2020	Sarileru Neekevvaru	In a mid-credits scene, Nagendra is a reformed leader who believes in discipline and respects everyone, and Ajay Krishna marries Samskruthi.
2020	Pattas	A montage of images and during the credits.
2020	Loop	In a post-credits scene, Renee's phone is resting in a glass of dry rice and receives a message from Marcus asking if she wants to go out canoeing. Renee's mother calls for her as she excitedly moans.
2020	Ala Vaikunthapurramuloo	In a post-credits scene, Bantu heads to his new office as the CEO with Ammu in a helicopter, making Valmiki jealous.
2020	Bheeshma	In a post-credits scene, Bheeshma is then appointed as the full-time CEO of Bheeshma Organics and Chaitra and Bheeshma marry and he says he is "Single for never" instead of "Single forever".
2020	Thappad	In a mid-credits scene, when Amrita and Vikram meet to finalize their divorce, Vikram realises he is wrong and apologizes to her properly and tells her that he rejected the promotion and quit his job. He wonders out loud why he ever thought that he had a right to hit her or disrespect her in any way. He explains that he will start again from scratch and will try to be someone who deserves her. They complete the formalities and part ways with a sense of renewed hope.
2020	Birds of Prey	In the post-credits scene during the credits rolling, Harley Quinn narrates at the audience, wondering why they are still there, and just when she is about to say something about Batman, she gets cut off.
2020	Zombies 2	Addison witnesses a blue glowing meteor falling from the sky in her bedroom and her radio shorts out, and her hair glows the same color as the meteor.
2020	Sonic the Hedgehog	In the first mid-credits scene, Robotnik, now sporting a shaved head and oversized moustache, is still in possession of Sonic's quill and usable equipment salvaged from the remains of his hovercraft. He plans to return to Earth and get his revenge against Sonic, Tom and Maddie.; In a second mid-credits scene, an anthropomorphic two-tailed fox (Note: Identified offscreen as Tails.) emerges from a ring portal on Earth, searching for Sonic.
2020	Stargirl	At an unspecified time, "Stargirl" is sung to Leo.
2020	Trolls World Tour	King Gristle and Bridget (now Queen of Bergens) arrive to Troll Village, unaware of the events that have taken place, and are worried they have missed the party.
2020	Tanhaji	In a mid-credits scene, Shivaji personally oversees Rayba's marriage, while Savitri Bai fulfill's her promise to Tanhaji by adorning herself as a bride behind closed doors, as she awaits his return. Aurangzeb's aim of ruling southern India remained unfilled for 18 years, until he himself tried to claim it from the Marathas in Tinak Tinak is sung.
2020	Da 5 Bloods	In an ancient Vietnamese temple, the whole cast and crew of the film say "shit" for at least thirty seconds before Spike Lee says "Cut!"
2020	The High Note	The music producer says "Is this dope or is this dope? Trick question. This is dope."
2020	Bhoot – Part One: The Haunted Ship	In the post-credits scene, a black figure is seen moving around Prithvi's home.
2020	Carmen Sandiego: To Steal or Not to Steal	The end credits roll over an instrumental version of the theme to another 1990s animated Carmen series, Where on Earth Is Carmen Sandiego?
2020	The Willoughbys	After the credits, the cat is seen licking himself clean. He then turns to the camera and tells the audience that it isn't weird because it's just how he cleans.
2020	Shubh Mangal Zyada Saavdhan	In a mid-credits scene, "Are Pyaar Kear Le" is sung.
2020	Dharala Prabhu	In a mid-credits scene, He further reveals that 49 children were conceived through Prabhu's donations. With a change of heart, Nidhi reconciles with Prabhu. Prabhu, Nidhi, Kavya, Kannadasan, and other families (whose children were conceived via Prabhu) celebrate.
2020	The Old Guard	News clippings and historical evidence from the team saving people, then flies get erased.
2020	Velvet Nagaram	In a mid-credits scene, Usha and Gowri.
2020	HIT: The First Case	In a mid-credits scene, Vikram almost gets shot by a sniper. It is then hinted that the story would continue in HIT: The Second Case.
2020	Palm Springs	Roy finds Nyles at the wedding and tells him that Sarah called him about the crazy theory, but Nyles does not remember him.
2020	I Still Believe	The credits reveal that Jeremy and Adrienne were married in 2003, and have three children.
2020	The Rental	A new set of friends being spied upon through the newly installed cameras in the rental property.
2020	Upside-Down Magic	The book on Shadow Magic falls off the shelf and opens to a picture of the Sage Academy emblem which glows ominously, implying its power could return for revenge.
2020	Scoob!	During the credits, a montage of different Hanna-Barbera characters make their debuts as Blue Falcon recruits Jabberjaw, Atom Ant, Captain Caveman, and Grape Ape. Meanwhile, Muttley helps Dick Dastardly escape from jail, and after the credits, spooky howling sounds are heard.
2020	Out	In a post-credits scene, mom and dad are driving home listening to a rather upbeat club song (the same music that plays from the rainbow that cosmic animals emerge from).
2020	An American Pickle	Ben and Herschel are watching Yentl at Ben's apartment and Herschel talks about his attraction to Barbra Streisand.
2020	Project Power	Robin is writing rap lyrics in her journal.
2020	The One and Only Ivan	During the credits, photos and footage of the real Ivan are shown with a summary of his life.; As the credits continue rolling, Ivan is greeted by Bob, now adopted by Julia and George, who have come with Mack to visit the animals.
2020	Bill & Ted Face the Music	Sometime in the future, the elderly Bill and Ted play their electric guitars in their assisted living facility.
2020	Phineas and Ferb the Movie: Candace Against the Universe	Phineas and Candace's step-father and Ferb's father, Lawrence, discovers that the portal is still in the backyard and ends up in Dr. Doofenshmirtz's lab which was still on fire from the Galactic-Travelinator's fire. He returns and accidentally destroys the portal, with Linda once again missing it and wondering what he has been doing, to which Lawrence replies, "I have no idea".
2020	Lego DC Shazam! Magic and Monsters	In a mid-credit scene, Lobo apprehends Mister Mind for his $1,000,000,000,000 bounty, much to his dismay.
2020	Unpregnant	Veronica and Bailey start a new road trip, this time to Roswell.
2020	The Babysitter: Killer Queen	In a mid-credits scene, the Devil's Book is shown on the sand, still intact.
2020	The Broken Hearts Gallery	During the credits, Gallery attendees continue to dance and then Nick shares his mementos with Lucy.
2020	Jiang Ziya	In a mid-credits scene, three gods are posted to guard a heavenly prison. In another, Jiang Ziya has dinner with Nezha.
2020	Antebellum	The FBI investigates the plantations, the slaves are rescued, the Civil War re-enactment Park is shut-down.
2020	12 Hour Shift	Mandy takes a nap in her car and later returns to work, followed shortly thereafter by Nicholas.
2020	Uma Maheswara Ugra Roopasya	Later in credits it shows that Mahesh and Jyothi are together now.
2020	Hubie Halloween	A montage of Hubie being scared by pranks, a collection of outtakes, and a tribute to actor Cameron Boyce are shown during the credits.
2020	The War with Grandpa	A collection of behind-the-scenes footage, bloopers, and outtakes is shown during the credits.
2020	Concrete Cowboy	There are interviews with some of the real life Fletcher Street Riders.
2020	Chhalaang	In a mid-credits scene, Montu thanks the students and their parents for their trust and dedication. He then declares his love for Neelu, and she accepts his love proposal in "Teri Choriyaan" is sung.
2020	Soorarai Pottru	In a mid-credits scene, the Civil Aviation Minister of India summons Paresh to Delhi, and reprimands him for sabotaging Deccan Air's inaugural flight, and threatens to shut down Jaz Airlines. Paresh is later seen in a restroom getting an anxiety attack and tries to take his pill, but it falls on the ground. A janitor in the bathroom picks the pill up for Paresh, causing Paresh to have respect for lower-income groups.
2020	Red Shoes and the Seven Dwarfs	In the end credits, Snow and Merlin marry and the other dwarfs find their own unusual-looking girlfriends. The Fairy Princess fishes Average out of a river and, after he makes a rude remark, turns him into another green dwarf.
2020	Love and Monsters	Illustrations and new entries from Joel's Monster Guide Vol. 2
2020	The Witches	Shortly into the credits, an epilogue cuts in and shows what the main characters are doing well after the main events of the story end.
2020	After We Collided	Trevor is practicing on how to ask out Tessa on a date.
2020	V	In a mid-credits scene, Vishnu hands over the video to Aditya, to expose the criminals. Aditya later releases it to the press and regains his job. Days later, Apoorva writes a novel about the events, titled Saheba. Vishnu, who receives a copy, sees that it has been dedicated to V.
2020	Clouds	noticing that a cloud in the sky resembles a "Z". Photos of the real Zach and Sammy are shown during the end credits.
2020	Buddy Games	In the credits, Zane reveals that he is gay to Doc and Durfy secures a role on a CW show. Shelly, after avoiding all contact with Bender, is kidnapped by Bender who reveals that he has used part of his winnings to purchase a variety of artificial scrotums for Shelly.
2020	Monster Hunter	The fight with dragon continues and a dark hooded figure on top of the tower looks down at the fight. The Cat also joins the fight with the dragon. The Cat slashes at the screen before it goes black and returns to the credits.
2020	Once Upon a Snowman	During the credits, Olaf is seen coming across Anna, Kristoff and Sven who will eventually give him his carrot nose. (Note: As depicted in Frozen (2013))
2020	The Call	In a mid-credits scene, older Young-sook calls her younger counterpart to warn her about Eun-ae and the police officer arriving, allowing Young-sook to alter her own history, resulting in the erasing of Eun-ae from present day Seo-yeon's side. The scene then cuts to the torture room where a person tied to a chair and covered in a white cloth is screaming for help. The cloth is removed, revealing a frightened adult Seo-yeon, once again a captive of Young-sook.
2020	The Midnight Sky	During the credits, Sully and Adewole are left with nothing but to return to K-23 using a course provided by Lofthouse.
2020	The Prom	The characters have Prom photographs part-way through the end credits.
2020	Safety	During the credits, it is revealed that Ray graduated as he and Fahmarr reunited with their completely sober mother. Real footage is played of their appearance on Oprah as well as Ray playing football.
2020	We Bare Bears: The Movie	During the credits, more bears arrive in San Francisco with many of them adopting human behavior similar to Grizzly, Panda, and Ice Bear while humans begin adopting many of the Bears' behavior such as the stack.
2020	Holidate	The end credits reveal that all of the couples are still together. Sloane and Jackson travel to Australia for the holidays, Abby and Peter get remarried, Susan and Faarooq get engaged, Elaine and Wally are together, and Neil and Carly (Jackson's date from the beginning of the film) spend Christmas with her family.
2020	The Rescue	In a mid-credits scene, Gao Qian, Gao Yicong, and Fang Yuling are invited to a party at the doctor's house. While on a video call, Yicong's triangle-playing female classmate sees him accept a drink from a girl at the party and becomes angry.
2020	Sylvie's Love	The end credits intersperse scenes of Robert, Sylvie, and Michelle at the beach with scenes showing that Robert inherited Sylvie's father's saxophone and eventually started performing again, while Sylvie continued to work in production.
2020	Soul	In a post-credits scene, Terry tells the viewers that the movie's over and orders them to go home.
2020	Wonder Woman 1984	In a mid-credits scene, Asteria is revealed to be secretly living among humans.
2020	Vanguard	A collection of behind the scenes and during the credits directed by Stanley Tong.
2020	The Comeback Trail	In a mid-credits scene, a fake trailer for the film Killer Nuns is shown.
2020	The Nowhere Inn	In a post-credits scene, as the main interview concludes, Brownstein gives St. Vincent a nod from behind the camera.
2021	Locked Down	During the credits, Paxton is shown following an online recipe to make bread and then enjoying his creation.
2021	Bhoomi	In a mid-credits scene, Airplane is Richard Child, Sakthi, Drink Tea and Bhoomninathan phone, Vande Mataram.
2021	Music	A short clip from an episode of Music's favorite show, "Radgicals", plays at the end of the credits.; In Sia's special thanks, she credits "Godchild" in reference to Maddie Ziegler, "Bunkie" in reference to her makeup artist, Tonya Brewer, and "Le David", a nickname for her manager, David Russell. She also credits "My Australians"
2021	Finding ʻOhana	Leilani calls a family meeting and proposes they decide as a group to all stay in Hawaiʻi or return to Brooklyn, they decide to stay and start to live a better life.
2021	Detective Chinatown 3	During the credits, With the arrest of Kobayashi and the acquittal of Masaru, the film ends with all the other detectives ranked under Q in Crimaster to be united against Q and fighting them in "Heal the World" is sung.
2021	Flora & Ulysses	Miller is on a date with Rita where he shyly admits that he is frightened of some things. It is revealed that Mr. Klaus belongs to Rita who is calm and kind to her and not happy to see Miller after their last encounter.
2021	Barb and Star Go to Vista Del Mar	A music video featuring the cast and crew runs during the first half of the credits.; Then there's a quick scene with the Talking Club where Delores asks again if she can finally talk about horses, only to be forced to hand over her tea.; In a post-credits scene, The Speedo guy makes a toast to friendship, and Morgan Freeman the crab agrees.
2021	Tom & Jerry	Tom pulls a curtain featuring the classic "The End" headline from the cartoons, breaking the fourth wall, thus allowing the two rivals to continue antagonizing each other, closing the movie.; Ben tells Henry and Terrence he got a bill to pay for two weddings which he thought was a joke. Henry tells Ben that Terrance ran up the bill which he tells Ben it did not work for him and Terrance says to Ben, "Thank you for choosing the Royal Gate." And he walks off with Ben feeling completely puzzled.
2021	The United States vs. Billie Holiday	Andra Day (as Billie) sings "All of Me" and has a stormy dancing lesson with Jimmy Fletcher.
2021	Coming 2 America	A collection of outtakes and bloopers runs during the end credits.; Saul tells Baba a bad joke about a lion and a monkey.
2021	Thunder Force	Thunder Force, now with Emily and Lydia's friendship even stronger, are offered the assistance of the city's resources by the mayor, which they accept.
2021	Bad Trip	Behind-the-scenes footage plays during the closing credits, showing the reactions of the people who appeared throughout the film upon being told they were part of a hidden camera prank.
2021	Yes Day	In a mid-credits scene, the Torres family and other players pelt Mr. Deacon with Kool Aid balloons at the Capture the Flag field as revenge for suggesting Yes Day in the first place.
2021	Nobody	David Mansell and Harry Mansell are in an RV and David asks Harry if he is going to tell him what happened. Harry says that he wouldn't believe it if he told him. David says "You're right" and then asks why they can't just fly. Harry responds, "With this Luggage?" A bunch of assault rifles in the back of the RV are then shown.
2021	Arlo the Alligator Boy	Edmee, Arlo's mother, got a postcard from Arlo and his friends.
2021	Teddy	In the mid-credits scene, Shiva realizes that when Sri falls asleep, her soul is transferred back to the Teddy.
2021	Yuvarathnaa	In the first mid-credits scene, The students' results are announced and everyone passes the exams with flying colors and celebrates. Yuva, along with other students, are celebrating RK university's 50 year celebration.; In the second mid-credits scene, where Gurudev hands over the prize of honor Yuvarathnaa to Yuva and Wall of Fame.
2021	The Mitchells vs. the Machines	The first part of the credits display images of key personnel on the film as children. After the credits, Katie can be heard saying "Whoa!" then her laughing. Then she could be heard saying "I don't know, you guys can't see me, right?" as the screen cuts to black.
2021	A Writer's Odyssey	In a mid-credits scene, Guan Ning sets out to follow Kongwen but finds in befriending him that he cannot bring himself to kill him.
2021	Jungle Beat: The Movie	Grogon discovers that Ribbert has eaten his gun after eating Fneep's, Tallbert is seen talking in Shona language with the translation device Trunk and the mama ostrich use on him, and Munki, in a protective suit made of vines, finally manages to give Humph a hug.
2021	Without Remorse	In a mid-credits scene, Clark is seen talking to Ritter about creating a multinational counter-terrorism team, codenamed "Rainbow".
2021	Vanakkam Da Mappilei	A collection of outtakes and bloopers runs during the end credits.
2021	Cruella	Cruella delivers two Dalmatian puppies named Pongo and Perdita to Roger and Anita, respectively. Now working as a songwriter, Roger begins creating the song "Cruella de Vil".
2021	The Conjuring: The Devil Made Me Do It	Interview with the real Warrens on TV related to case. This is followed by the sound bite of the exorcism for David. While sound bite is rolling, the credits show pictures of the case and the actors on some pivotal scenes.
2021	Awake	She awakens just as the camera cuts to the credits.
2021	In the Heights	The piragüero gloats over the fact that Mister Softee's ice-cream truck broke down and all the customers are returning to him, and he raises his prices to take advantage of the situation. The scene ends with him giving the Mister Softee guy one of his piraguas.
2021	Joji	In the mid-credits scene, it is shown that Joji survives and awakens in the hospital, paralyzed. When the police officer asks a bedridden Joji to confess to his crimes by blinking his eyes, Joji forcefully does not blink.
2021	Peter Rabbit 2: The Runaway	In the first mid-credits scene, Bea and Thomas have a baby girl while it is revealed that a second book was published titled Peter Rabbit 2.; In the second mid-credits scene, the rooster and his children discover their purpose on the farm. By crowing in the morning and so happens to be time sprinklers come out believing its their power and duty to crow the sprinklers on to save the farm from the ball of fire (Sun).; As the credits end, there is a faint groan.
2021	Extinct	In a mid-credits scene, Op surprises Ed by pulling Wally into the Time Terminal. Wally exclaims that they have so much to talk about, while Op leaves to "get him a glass of water".
2021	Hitman's Wife's Bodyguard	Agent O'Neill calls Michael and tells him he will have to stay on the boat with Darius and Sonia. Michael, forced to listen and watch while Darius and Sonia have wild sex below, walks off the boat.
2021	22 vs. Earth	In a post-credits scene, the soul counselor is seen having learned the meaning of life, stating their feelings of being underwhelmed.
2021	Fatherhood	Matt takes Maddy to school with Maddy dressed in pants and Matt dressed in the school uniform skirt.
2021	Luca	Luca's uncle Ugo Paguro talks to a stray goatfish about his great life in the depths of the water.
2021	Toofaan	During the credits, Aziz Wins.
2021	F9	In a mid-credits scene, Deckard comes face-to-face with Han, shocked to see him alive.
2021	Black Widow	After Natasha Romanoff's death, Yelena Belova encounters Contessa Valentina Allegra de Fontaine at Romanoff's grave and receives her next assignment: take down Clint Barton, the man "responsible" for Romanoff's death.
2021	Space Jam: A New Legacy	Images of the Tunes in the real world are shown.; At the end of the credits, a crown and carrot are shown, resembling LeBron James and Bugs Bunny, as Porky Pig says his "That's all folks!" line.
2021	Fear Street Part Three: 1666	In a mid-credits scene, an unknown person steals the widow's satanic book from the tunnels.
2021	Snake Eyes	In a mid-credits scene, The Baroness invites Tommy to join Cobra, and he declares a new name for himself: "Storm Shadow".
2021	The Medium	A mid-credits scene shows Nim undergoing a crisis of faith one day before her death. She wonders if she has really been possessed by Ba Yan before breaking down in tears.
2021	Paagal	In a mid-credits scene, it is shown that Prem brings Raja Reddy to where Theera is staying. Both daughter and father exchange their happiness. Prem and Theera get married with a happy ending.
2021	Shershaah	The ending shows Vikram Batra's funeral in Palampur Kangra and a distraught Dimple. The real Batra is also shown in the credits.
2021	Spin	The mid-credits show that Sunday nights at the restaurant are now DJ nights, with DJ Rhea on the turntable; Watson and Molly have finally perfected their pizza drone project which now also serves food to the guests; Naomi and Arvind have been growing closer since the contest. Rhea is happy, having finally found what she wanted to do, and honoring her late mother.
2021	The Suicide Squad	In a mid-credits scenes, it is revealed that Weasel is alive, and he runs into the Corto Maltese jungle.; In a post-credits scene, Amanda Waller punishes two of her subordinates, Emilia Harcourt and John Economos, by assigning them to a new mission with Peacemaker, who is still alive and recovering in a hospital. (Note: This scene sets up the events of the first season of the spin-off television series Peacemaker (2022))
2021	Joe Bell	As the credits roll, images and videos of the real Bell family are shown.
2021	Jolt	In a mid-credits scene, Andy the hacker discovers that the keys given to her by Lindy as payment are for Justin's supercar.
2021	The Green Knight	A mid-credits scene shows a ring of stones then descends to the bottom of a mossy pit.; A post-credits scene shows a young girl (interpreted by some to be Gawain's daughter) examining and trying on his crown.
2021	PAW Patrol: The Movie	During the credits, Mayor Humdinger and the Catastrophe Crew are shown to have been apprehended and detained for their crimes throughout the movie while being removed from the city mayoral office, the Cloud Catcher has been rebuilt, and Butch and Ruben are riding a tandem bicycle while pulling a cart full of cats.
2021	The Loud House Movie	Several images of the characters from the TV series appear in the credits.; Cupcakes with crowns are shown during the credits, Clyde says "Welcome home, buddy." and Lincoln says "Thanks, Clyde." after that, they both eat the cupcakes with crowns, after that, Clyde says "Huh?" and Lincoln says "Just the right amount of cinnamon".; Still images are shown that include but are not limited to the Duke's ghost riding Lela, Bobby reuniting with Lori, Leni contacting Scott online, Lincoln winning a 3rd-place trophy at a magic show, Lela having laid three eggs, and Angus and the ghosts rescuing Morag who now works as the groundskeeper with Lela keeping her in line.
2021	Annette	Near the end of the credits the cast is shown walking with paper lanterns and singing a new song bidding the audience good night.
2021	Bhoot Police	During the credits, "Aaya Aaya Bhoot Police" is sung.; In a post-credits scene, Then Chedilal is on phone with an unknown person who asks him if the Bhoot Police is ready to take a case involving werewolves and vampires. Chedilal tells him to first book three business class tickets to Scotland, hinting at a sequel.
2021	Bell Bottom	In a mid-credits scene, it is revealed that Radhika was actually working for RAW and had informed them of her husband's abilities and background in the first place.
2021	Master	In a post-credits scene, The detention facility is shut down by the government, with the inmates being sent to other detention facilities and state prisons, on the basis of their age. J.D., Das and the other adults from the facility are sent to prison, where they intend to reform the inmates there.
2021	Kasada Tabara	During the credits, Bala and Isaac phone.
2021	Candyman	The film's end credits feature a shadow puppet montage of members of the growing Candyman hive, including Daniel, Sherman, Anthony Crawford, James Byrd Jr., George Stinney and Anthony himself.
2021	Vakeel Saab	In a mid-credits scene, Satyadev decides to return to his profession to help the common people with their problems. Zareena regains a job, Pallavi gets engaged and Divya enters her newly constructed home.
2021	The Good, the Bart, and the Loki	That night, Loki goes to bed where Bart sleeps which Homer mistakes him for Bart just before the short ends with a montage of credits.; In a mid-credits scene, Loki disguised as Moe Szyslak gives patrons at Moe's Tavern free drinks.; In two post-credits scenes, Ralph Wiggum as the Hulk smashes Loki similarly to a scene from The Avengers (2012), and Loki stands before Ravonna Renslayer at the Time Variance Authority, where she finds him guilty of his various crimes, such as crossing over to the Simpsons universe.
2021	Respect	As the credits roll, Aretha Franklin's performance of "Natural Woman" at the 2015 Kennedy Center Honors plays.
2021	Don't Breathe 2	In a mid-credits scene, Raylan's dog walks to Norman's body and licks his fingers. Norman's fingers twitch slightly, indicating that he is alive.
2021	Shang-Chi and the Legend of the Ten Rings	Wong and Shang-Chi speak with Carol Danvers and Bruce Banner and discover that the ten rings are emitting a mysterious signal. Wong tells Shang-Chi and Katy that they should go home and get some rest, but instead all three are shown at a karaoke establishment singing "Hotel California".; Xu Xialing becomes the new leader of the Ten Rings.
2021	The Battle at Lake Changjin	In a mid-credits scenes, show a U.S. mass grave at Hungnam as the city burns during the Hungnam evacuation. Captions state that 105,000 U.S. troops were evacuated by 24 December and that the 9th Corps captured Hungnam. The captions explain the significance of the battle of Lake Changjin, which was a "perfect example for annihilating a U.S. reinforced regiment", how it, together with operations in the west, stopped MacArthur's "presumptuous" plan to end the war by Christmas and forced the U.S.-led "UN Command" back from the Yalu River and below the 38th Parallel and "set the stage for the final victory of the War to Resist U.S. Aggression and Aid Korea." The captions state that more than 197,000 Chinese died in the war. The film ends with the caption: "The great spirit of the War to Resist U.S. Aggression and Aid (North) Korea will eternally be renewed! Eternal glory to the great martyrs of the People's Volunteer Army!"
2021	Venom: Let There Be Carnage	In a mid-credits scene, as Venom tells Eddie Brock about the symbiotes' knowledge of other universes, a blinding light suddenly transports them from their hotel room to another room where they watch J. Jonah Jameson talking about Spider-Man's revealed identity as Peter Parker on television. (Note: Eddie and Venom are transported to the Marvel Cinematic Universe (MCU) as a result of Doctor Strange's spell in Spider-Man: No Way Home (2021).)
2021	Kaadan	In a mid-credits scene, breaking glass window open the door and little girl and father, pushed the door and white.
2021	Annabelle Sethupathi	In a post-credits scene, The movie then returns to the scene where Kadhir and his goons were pushed out of the palace, hinting at a sequel to the story.
2021	Vinodhaya Sitham	During the credits, a politician comes across Time during a political rally. When the politician confronts Time for wearing a black shirt when all others are wearing white, Time informs him that his time is over. The screen then cuts to black.
2021	The Medium	A mid-credits scene shows Nim undergoing a crisis of faith one day before her death. Before breaking down in tears, she wonders whether she has truly been possessed by Ba Yan or if she has been imagining it all along.
2021	Green Snake	In the mid-credits scene, the fox-demon meets with the river monster under the same bridge, where he gives her a severed fox tail. She states that her enemy is near and she must plot her revenge.
2021	Ali & Ratu Ratu Queens	Ali's cousin flies to NYC to meet Ali upon Suci's demand.
2021	Jai Bhim	In a mid-credits scene, The court praises Perumalsamy and Chandru for their hardwork. Sengeni is awarded ₹3 lakhs (equivalent to ₹18 lakh or US$23,000 in 2020) and half a ground land in her village as compensation, and Iruttappan, Mosakutty and Pachaiamma are awarded ₹2 lakhs (equivalent to ₹12 lakh or US$15,000 in 2020) each. Sengeni thanks Chandru for his help, and Chandru attends the inauguration of Sengeni's new house, fulfilling Rajakannu's dream to buy Sengeni a new home.
2021	Pokémon the Movie: Secrets of the Jungle	Skwovet and Cramorant are shown dancing near the waterfalls.
2021	Doctor	In a mid-credits scene, Padmini reconciles with Varun and they get married in presence of their family and friends and "Chellamma" is sung.
2021	Muppets Haunted Mansion	In the post-credits scene, Statler and Waldorf make their traditional last heckle.
2021	Ron's Gone Wrong	End credits start when suddenly comes a computer-like error. Later, Ron interacts throughout the end credits doing things like playing pong and being pursued by 4 minibots.
2021	Malik	In a mid-credits scene, Anwar reveals to the media that the riots at Ramadapally were instigated by the police with the help of the government.
2021	The Deep House	In a post-credits scene, Pierre is shown bringing two new female divers to the secret location.
2021	Raging Fire	A dedication to director Benny Chan is shown, then during the credits behind-the-scenes footage of the Chan is shown as a tribute to the director, who died in 2020 after filming had completed.
2021	My Little Pony: A New Generation	In a mid-credits scene, a trio of foals – one Earth pony, one unicorn, and one pegasus – sing together. As they run off to play, they leave glowing heart-shaped hoofprints in the grass.
2021	MGR Magan	In a mid-credits scene, Anbalipu Ravi, M G Ramasamy and Agniswaran crowds.
2021	Kotigobba 3	In the mid-credits scene The film ends with Shiva a.k.a. Ghost resuming his vigilante activities in far-off place.
2021	Eternals	Thena, Makkari, and Druig are visited by the Eternal Eros, Thanos' brother, and his assistant Pip the Troll, who offer their help.; Dane Whitman opens an old chest inherited from his ancestors that contains the legendary Ebony Blade, while an off-screen Blade questions him whether he is ready for it.
2021	Ghostbusters: Afterlife	In a mid-credits scene, the original Ghostbusters return to New York City and Peter is revealed to be married to Dana Barrett.; In a post-credits scene, Winston, having become a wealthy entrepreneur and family man since leaving the Ghostbusters, returns the fully restored Ecto-1 to the team's old firehouse headquarters. In the basement, a light on their old ghost containment system begins to flash red.
2021	Summer of Soul (... Or, When the Revolution Could Not Be Televised)	Stevie Wonder is talking on the microphone and pulls his bandleader Gene Key close to him. Gene is a little upset because Stevie has his free hand all over Gene's suit. Gene finally says, "Get your hands off MY CLOTHES!" and Stevie responds, "What do you mean your clothes? I bought 'em!"
2021	Bunty Aur Babli 2	In a mid-credits scene, Inspector Jayatu Singh and Dev "Pappu" Trivedi.
2021	Resident Evil: Welcome to Raccoon City	In a mid-credits scene, Wesker awakens in a body bag, unable to see anything. A figure then hands him sunglasses and reveals herself as Ada Wong.
2021	Maanaadu	A Collection of outtakes and during the credits.; In the post-credits scene, Khaliq awakens to find the time loop has still not ended.
2021	Rumble	All of the characters in the movie are dancing during the credits.; Steve and Winnie get brain freeze after eating too many fro-yos.; Marc Remy turns Lights Out McGinty's lights off.
2021	The Tender Bar	During the credits, young JR spends a day at the beach with Charlie and his friends.
2021	Aranmanai 3	In a post-credits scene, "Ratapapata" is sung.
2021	The French Dispatch	During the closing credits, there is a dedication to the following writers and editors, many of whom were associated with The New Yorker: Harold Ross, William Shawn, Rosamond Bernier, Mavis Gallant, James Baldwin, A. J. Liebling, S. N. Behrman, Lillian Ross, Janet Flanner, Lucy Sante, James Thurber, Joseph Mitchell, Wolcott Gibbs, St. Clair McKelway, Ved Mehta, Brendan Gill, E. B. White, and Katharine White, and additionally to Christophe, writer of the featured song "Aline". Accompanying the credits are covers of the French Dispatch which are reminiscent of The New Yorker covers.
2021	Cinderella	The Fabulous Godmother is exasperated by the length of the credit roll, saying at the end "Okay, okay, dang."
2021	Sooryavanshi	In a post-credits scene, "Aila Re Ailiaa" is sung.
2021	Spider-Man: No Way Home	Following the mid-credits scene in Venom: Let There Be Carnage, the universe-displaced Eddie Brock and his symbiote Venom have a conversation with a bartender and decide to find Spider-Man, but are suddenly returned to their universe due to Strange's spell, unknowingly leaving behind a part of the symbiote.; A teaser trailer for Doctor Strange in the Multiverse of Madness is shown in the post-credits scene.; In The More Fun Stuff Version of the film released in September 2022, this trailer is replaced by a scene of Betty Brant highlighting the last four academic years of Midtown School, with Peter Parker being absent or obscured from all photographs.
2021	The Matrix Resurrections	Game developers brainstorming ideas to generate maximum interest in a new Matrix game suggest a series of Matrix-themed cat videos titled The Catrix.
2021	Atrangi Re	In a mid-credits scene, "Garda" is sung.
2021	83	As the credits roll: The real Kapil Dev is shown sharing his experience of winning the World Cup along with a montage of vintage photographs of the team.; P. R. Man Singh tells that a journalist named David Frith wrote in the beginning that if India won the World Cup he would eat his words and after the win at 4. a.m. in the morning Man Singh wrote a letter to Frith, telling him to live up to his promise and a month later Frith went to Lords with wine and ate up the article he wrote.; A montage of videos and images of the Indian Cricket Team is followed after that.
2021	Nona	In a post-credits scene, Nona is on the couch with a sleeping dog and Renee on top of her as the latter's favorite show Kitty Kitty Dance Party plays. Nona tries to reach for the remote, but it falls to the floor, frustrating her.
2021	Jujutsu Kaisen 0	Geto's former ally Miguel eats lunch with Yuta in Kenya, and Gojo comes to join them.
2021	Batman: The Long Halloween - Part One	In a post-credits scene, Carmine Falcone pressures Bruce to help launder his funds during Alberto's funeral. When Bruce refuses, Falcone introduces the woman accompanying him. Vines grip Bruce's arm as they shake hands and cause his eyes to turn green. The woman is Poison Ivy and has taken control of him.; In a post-credits scene, On Halloween, children start trick-or-treating again. That night, (Note: In a post-credits scene.) Flash (Note: Flash previously appeared in Justice Society: World War II.) and Green Arrow (Note: Green Arrow later appears as a member of Justice League in Green Lantern: Beware My Power.) visit Bruce. (Note: This story is continued in Justice League: Crisis on Infinite Earths – Part One.)
2021	Zeros and Ones	The film opens with a video of Ethan Hawke discussing his thoughts and feelings before shooting the film, then in a mid-credits scene there is a second video of Ethan Hawke discussing his thoughts and feelings after viewing the finished film. At the end of the second video he explicitly states, "This is part of the movie, by the way."
2021	Don't Look Up	In a mid-credits scene, after 22,740 years, the people who left Earth before the impact land on a lush alien planet, ending their cryogenic sleep. They exit their spacecraft naked and mostly empty-handed, admiring the habitable world. Orlean is quickly killed and eaten by an alien creature (a "Bronteroc") as others of its kind attack the humans.; A post-credits scene shows Jason emerging from the rubble, having survived the meteor, screaming for his mother and trying to post on social media on his phone.
2021	The King's Man	Hanussen is revealed to have taken on the Shepherd identity, and introduces Vladimir Lenin to the Moustached Man: a young Adolf Hitler.
2021	Murungakkai Chips	A collection of bloopers during the ending credits.
2021	Sing 2	The characters dance and walk across the screen during the credits while the song "There's Nothing Holdin' Me Back" by Shawn Mendes plays.
2021	American Underdog	There are some home video clips of Kurt, Brenda, and Zack and it is shown that Zack lives in Treasure House, an assisted living community created by the Warners.
2021	Seal Team	In a series of mid-credits scenes, Dave is seen as a caller on a talk show radio station, where continuously talks about the many objects he accidentally ate other than plankton to prove that not all sharks are dangerous.
2022	Hotel Transylvania: Transformania	The first part of the credits show (in cartoon form) the activities in the newly reopened Mavis N' Johnny's Hotel Transylvania and Health Spa.; Another shot has Human Griffin's butt shot in front of "The End" Card while the screen cuts to black.
2022	Marry Me	There are several scenes of Kat and Charlie together at rehearsals and Kat dancing with the teenagers at his school. This is followed by a quick scene of Kat trying to feed Tank a doggie treat, only to be scared by him snapping at her hand. Then several couples tell amusing stories of how they met up, ending with Kat and Charlie saying they met at a concert.
2022	Through My Window	The end credits roll as Ares climbs up her window to surprise her.
2022	The Battle at Lake Changjin II	Wanli returns to his family village as the scene fades and the credits begin.
2022	Jackass Forever	There are outtakes, behind-the-scenes pranks, videos from the original MTV show, and bloopers showing throughout the credits.
2022	By Two Love	In the mid-credits scene, Balu and Leelu get married in presence of their parents, friends and Puppy.; As the credits roll, A collection of behind the scenes and during the credits and directed by Hari Santhosh.
2022	Uncharted	In a first mid-credits scene, it shows that Nate's lost brother, Sam, is alive but is being held in prison, where he is writing another postcard to his brother.; In second mid-credits scene, Nate meets with a man working for Roman, offering his ring for a "Nazi map" he has. The man double-crosses Nate, but Sully, who has now grown a mustache on his face, saves him. Nate and Sully then attempts to escape, but the two get caught by an unseen figure.
2022	Texas Chainsaw Massacre	In a post-credits scene, Leatherface is shown carrying the chainsaw back to the house where his original massacre took place.
2022	A Madea Homecoming	Madea does her own version of Beyonce's Homecoming.
2022	Turning Red	Jin Lee secretly dances and sings to a 4*Town song on one of Mei's CDs in the basement, who is revealing a 4* Town fan, while Mei asks her father to find her CD.
2022	The Batman	The Riddler's computer terminal is shown with the command showing "Good Bye" and a glitch showing the URL "rataalada.com".
2022	Radhe Shyam	In a mid-credits scene, Vikramaditya and Prerana get married. At the same time, Tara wins the Paralympics.
2022	RRR	In a mid-credits scene as the credits roll, Ram educates Bheem to return the favor. Ram returns to his village and delivers the weapons as promised while Bheem returns to his hamlet, reuniting Malli with her mother.; As the credits still roll, "Etthara Jenda" plays with director, S.S. Rajamouli appearing.
2022	The Lost City	Jack, having survived his attempted killing, attends a yoga class alongside Loretta and Alan, surprising them.
2022	Morbius	In the first mid-credits scene, Adrian Toomes finds himself transported to Sony's Spider-Man Universe during the climax of Spider-Man: No Way Home.; In the second mid-credits scene, Toomes approaches Dr. Michael Morbius, suggesting they form a team.
2022	The Bubble	In a mid-credits scene, director Darren Eigan wonders if they have enough footage to put a cut together. Gavin and Pippa tell him that it doesn't matter if the rest of the movie is bad as long as the ending is strong. Darren concludes, "Well, at least we tried to make a movie. They can't judge us for that. We made something that's a distraction in these difficult times."; In a post-credits scene, director Darren Eigan, wearing a face shield, complains, "It's really hard to direct in these things."
2022	Sonic the Hedgehog 2	In a mid-credits scene, GUN searches the crash site of the Giant Eggman Robot, not being able to find Robotnik. Agent Stone (with a scar on his face) is revealed to be a GUN soldier, hinting that Robotnik may be still alive. Commander Walters is then alerted of activity surrounding a 50-year-old file, Project Shadow. Shadow is then seen being released from a frozen state in an unknown location.
2022	Attack: Part 1	In the mid-credits scene, Arjun is appointed for another mission, thus hinting at the sequel Attack: Part 2.
2022	The In Between	In a mid-credits scene, Tessa and Skylar are wandering around the beach, tracing their silouettes in the sand.
2022	Beast	In a mid-credits scene, Veera recaptures Farooq in Pakistan and returns him to India after surviving a long air chase. Following the successful operation, Veera, Preethi, Dominic, and the rest of his crew celebrate their escapades in Goa and "Jolly O Gymkhana" is sung.
2022	Marmaduke	During the mid-credits scene, Zeus gets caught by security and is sent to the dog pound to get his fur shaved, while Henri and his twin are arrested by the police and put in jail.
2022	Father Stu	The closing credits show photos of the real-life Stu as a child, young adult, seminarian and priest.; A collection of bloopers an during the credits.
2022	K.G.F: Chapter 2	In the mid-credits scenes, three months post-Rocky's death, a CIA official hands over a file listing Rocky's crimes in United States and 16 other nations between 1978–1981 to Ramika Sen. In the present day, the peon of the television news channel finds the final draft of K.G.F: Chapter 3.
2022	The Bad Guys	In a mid-credits scene set a year later, the gang is released from prison early in light of their good behavior and leaves with Foxington, ready to begin their new crime-fighting careers.; At the end of the credits, a photo of the Bad Guys pauses on-screen and the group is heard laughing.
2022	Good Mourning	A post-credits scene appears to indicate that the events of the film were in fact an episode of a television show, with London Clash (played by a British actor) a character.
2022	Bubble	Realistic photos show Uta exploring around Tokyo.
2022	Kaathuvaakula Rendu Kaadhal	In a mid-credits scene, the story ends with Rambo leaving the audience speechless, when he says that Katrina Kaif begs via Instagram chat to start dating him.
2022	Etharkkum Thunindhavan	In the end credits it is said "Kannabiran Will be back" thus implying a sequel.
2022	F3: Fun and Frustration	In a mid-credits scene, the thief who stole the car reveals to Dileep that he sold all the diamonds at a cheap rate mistaking them for regular gemstones, and later gets elected as an MLA with the support of his buyers, and Dileep, who is ousted out of his job joins him as an assistant.
2022	Hey Sinamika	A collection of behind the scenes and during the credits.
2022	Achcham Madam Naanam Payirppu	In a mid-credits scene, Nothing has affected Pavithra's character. She accepts that each person's perspective is different but not wrong.
2022	Sarkaru Vaari Paata	In the mid-credits scene, Mahi tells that the government has changed and that Sarkaru Vaari Paata must be made to the public sector and everyone.; As the credits roll, A Collection of behind the scenes directed by Parasuram.; During the credits, "Murari Vaa" is sung.
2022	Doctor Strange in the Multiverse of Madness	Strange is approached by the sorceress Clea, who warns him that his actions have triggered an incursion that he must help stop. Strange follows her into the Dark Dimension.; The Pizza Poppa vendor, who was bewitched by Strange into beating himself up for three weeks, is shown punching himself until Strange's spell wears off. The vendor laughs maniacally and yells "It's over!".
2022	Chip 'n Dale: Rescue Rangers	The end credits show the Valley Gang in prison, Monterey Jack restored to normal, and the Rescue Rangers reboot being released to great success. Darkwing Duck is sitting at a table at the convention arguing that everyone actually wants a Darkwing Duck reboot.
2022	Don	In mid-credits scene, Chakravarthi is later added on to the Proud Alumni list at BEC, something which he asked from Bhoominathan, in his earlier days at the college.
2022	Nenjuku Needhi	In a post-credits scene, Who is behind this heinous crime and how Vijaya Raghavan takes this case forward despite pressure from his casteist higher officials forms the rest of the plot.
2022	Valley of the Dead	In the mid-credits scene, a hand moves amongst the train wreckage on the train as a scream is heard.
2022	KKN di Desa Penari	In a mid-credits scene, Nur visits a religious leader, who informs her that the old woman who protected her was the spirit Mbah Dok.
2022	Elizabeth: A Portrait in Parts	In a post-credits scene, a montage of videos showing performances of "God Save the Queen" in various styles is shown.
2022	The Bob's Burgers Movie	The closing credits feature many side characters dancing to "My Burger Buns" in front of closeups of burger ingredients.; In a post-credits scene, Tina has another fantasy about horseback riding with Jimmy Jr. and "sexy zombies".
2022	Manmadha Leelai	A collection of Outtakes during the credits.
2022	Vikram	In a post-credits scene, Adaikalam and Anbu arrive with their men at Sassoon Docks, Mumbai, and meet with the gangsters affiliated with Sandhanam for a meeting with Rolex. Adaikalam and Anbu explain Dilli's involvement in the Trichy drug ambush, and Sandhanam's men reveal Vikram's and Amar's involvement in the destruction of their drug syndicate. Meanwhile, after Gayathri's funeral in Ernakulam, Amar joins Vikram's gang to continue building a drug-free society. Anbu informs Rolex that Dilli is hiding somewhere in Uttar Pradesh while Sandhanam's men tell him Vikram's family are abroad (shown to be San Francisco, California). Rolex announces a massive bounty for the execution of Amar, Dilli, and Vikram's team. Unknown to everyone else, Vikram is present at the meeting and walks away with determination after learning about the bounty placed on all of them.
2022	Veetla Vishesham	A collection of outtakes ending credits.
2022	Lightyear	In a mid-credits scene, Commander Burnside is shown relaxing in his office and touting his laser shield after it successfully evaporates a space bug.; In a post-credits scene, E.R.I.C. continues to give directions on the map to the mine. When he finally finishes, he turns around and realizes everyone is gone.; Following the closing logos, Zurg's body floats in space. As the camera cuts to his face, his eyes light up, implying that he survived the fuel's explosion.
2022	Minions: The Rise of Gru	In a mid-credits scene, Gru attempts to hire Dr. Nefario in gratitude for an invention of his that helped him steal the stone. Nefario initially declines but changes his mind after Gru and the Minions beg, giving them a ride on a rocket-powered aircraft.
2022	Thor: Love and Thunder	Zeus is revealed to have survived his encounter with Thor and plans his revenge by sending his son Hercules to kill him.; Following her death, Jane Foster enters Valhalla and is greeted by Heimdall, who thanks her for looking over his son Axl.
2022	Paws of Fury: The Legend of Hank	A now imprisoned and sulking Ika Chu consoles himself that at least he will not have to play a part in a sequel.
2022	Yaanai	in a post-credits scene, Pappa and Raheem reunites with Ramachandran and Ravi is also finally accepted as their brother by PRV brothers.
2022	Fireheart	The end credits show that female firefighters were paid until 1973
2022	The Man from Toronto	During the credits, Teddy declares Randy as his partner in his new online gym, presenting him with a small payment toward replacing Debora, but Randy later calls Teddy during a live stream workout to threaten him.
2022	Purple Hearts	In the mid-credits scene, Cassie and Luke are walking on the beach at Sunset with Peaches the dog.; In the post-credits scene, a message appears in Spanish that means "Risk nothing, gain nothing."
2022	DC League of Super-Pets	In the mid-credits scene, Lex Luthor is trapped in the cell. Meanwhile, a defeated Lulu who was trapped inside the hot dog vendor, is found and kept by Luthor's assistant, Mercy Graves.; In the post-credits scene, Superman and Krypto encounter Black Adam along with his own super-powered dog, Anubis, and Krypto tricks them into flying to Pluto.
2022	The Legend	where a lead to the second part is clevery put into place.
2022	My Dear Bootham	In a mid-credits scene, Thiru speaking in a contest without stammering.
2022	Ek Villain Returns	During a mid-credits scene, at a mental asylum, Rakesh Mahadkar, who has survived the accident and became paraplegic meets Bhairav, who has lost an eye due to the tiger attack. Rakesh Mahadkar goes into Bhairav's room to unplug Bhairav's medication and machines and recites his promise from the prequel and Bhairav wakes up just before the screen cuts to black.
2022	Bullet Train	A mid-credits scene reveals that Lemon had emerged from the river and was the driver of the tangerine truck that killed the Prince, avenging Tangerine's death.
2022	Sita Ramam	In a mid-credits scene, Afreen is revealed to have apologised to Mehta and has also had 18 prisoners of India released from Pakistan's prison.; A Montages of Images and the end credits.
2022	Secret Headquarters	Charlie ends up joining Jack so they fight crime together.
2022	Easter Sunday	The producer tells Joe she wants to create a sitcom centered around Joe and his family rather than the one from the audition. Joe agrees, and the family celebrates. Later, Joe's family is seen giving pointers to the cast of Joe's new show.
2022	Dragon Ball Super: Super Hero	After their training battle, Vegeta and Goku are on the ground spent. Vegeta barely scraping by exclaims "I FINALLY BEAT KAKAROT". Whis finally discovers Bulma's earlier message, while Broly and Lemo are crying by the sparring match, much to Cheelai's irritation.
2022	Vendhu Thanindhathu Kaadu	In a mid-credits scene, Sridharan is living a life as a barber where Muthu's journey of becoming a gangster and how does Sridharan escaped from Kutty Bhai's henchmen and leading a normal life will be continued in the sequel.
2022	Nikamma	During the end credits, the whole family is enjoying and laughing at Adi as Avni again refuses to replace Adi with a maid to do house chores.; A mid-credit scene shows Vikramjeet's eyes opening up as the screen cuts to black.
2022	Bodies Bodies Bodies	One friend after another dies when a party game goes horribly wrong.
2022	Moon Man	In a mid-credits scene, Ma Lanxing is on the Moon with her crew and Dugu Yue who sacrificed himself for the Earth. The crew passes by him like a hologram and Ma Lanxing smiles with her lost love while they stare at the new Earth
2022	Viruman	In a mid-credits scene, Muniyandi tells Viruman to leave him there because he feels guilty for Muthulakshmi and his sister's death, and apologizes for his actions. Viruman forgives him, and they reconcile.
2022	Happy Birthday	In a post-credits scene, This movie may not be understandable by many viewers as it is supposed to be sequel to many movies unfinished stories. The wolverine scene at the end was the last nail on the coffin. Hats off to the director, actors and most importantly the story writer to have fixed the orphaned ends.
2022	Zombies 3	Bucky is shown boarding Mothership and activating it for launch, aiming to "bring cheer to the farthest reaches of the galaxy".
2022	Prey	In a post-credits scene, the narrative is summarized in a series of ledger art paintings that ends with a depiction of three Predator vessels descending towards the tribe.
2022	Brahmāstra: Part One – Shiva	In a post-credits scene, due to Junoon having activated the Brahmāstra, Dev, who was imprisoned as a statue on an unknown island, is freed.
2022	Thirteen Lives	The end credits reveal that the coach and three of the boys, who were all stateless, are given Thai citizenship. The film is dedicated to Saman Kunan, the Thai Navy Seal who died on July 6, 2018, during the rescue operation, and Beirut Pakbara, a Thai Navy Seal who later died from a blood infection.
2022	Do Revenge	Drea shows Russ a painting that says "I'm Sorry" then she kisses him.; Gabby shows up while Eleanor is at a beach then she kisses her.; Max hosts a meeting surrounded by men talking about his problems.
2022	Ponniyin Selvan: I	In a post-credits scene, Nadhini shown swimming in the sea to find Ponniyin Selvan and removes her scarf to reveal her looking similar to Nandini, setting the sequel.
2022	Ram Setu	In a post-credits scene, This further implies that AP is still alive and is in fact immortal and he faked his death to cause Aryan to fetch evidence for Ram Setu's existence without revealing his own identity. (Note: Anjaneya (from Anjana) being another name of Hanuman.)
2022	Clerks III	During the credits, director Kevin Smith thanks audience members for seeing the movie before reading some narration he cut from the final scene, where it is revealed that Randal continued to make movies until the age of 90, all while still working at the Quick Stop.
2022	Smile	Distorted versions of Rose's screams can be heard during the credits.
2022	Pearl	During the credits, As Howard stares in horror, Pearl greets him with a protracted, pained smile, saying, "I'm so happy you're home."
2022	Till	The post-credits state that Mamie's actions galvanized the Civil Rights Act of 1957. She dedicated her life to teaching children while continuing to fight for civil rights in America.
2022	Ordinary Hero	A montages of videos and photos during the credits.; During the credits, Zhou Yan, Lin Li, Mardan aka "Xiao Mai" and Flag Raising Ceremony.
2022	777 Charlie	In a mid-credits scene, Charlie's puppy, which is also named Charlie, is shown to be more mischievous than her mother.
2022	Hocus Pocus 2	A black cat is seen guarding another Black Flame Candle, hinting that the Sanderson Sisters survived.
2022	Godfather	In a mid-credits scene, Headlines of various international newspapers are shown reporting Abram as the head of an unnamed crime syndicate and the song "Thaar Maar Thakkar Maar" is sung.
2022	Old Man	During the credits, Genie is intermittently shown looking at the viewer (at one point overlaid with the cougar's eyes), shedding a tear, and finally throwing a vase of flowers at the viewer and laughing.
2022	Black Adam	In a mid-credits scene, a message from Waller warns a defiant Black Adam to never leave Kahndaq, before Superman arrives and suggests the two of them should talk.
2022	Gulu Gulu	In a post-credits scene, Phone Gulu Gulu/Mario Driving Car and Little Girl, Journey Never Ends.
2022	Thank You	In a mid-credits scene, Abhiram walking and crowds.
2022	The Witch: Part 2. The Other One	A post-credits scene reveals that Jo-hyeon and Tom survived the chaos, and are joined by more "witches" in order to track Ja-yoon and her sister.
2022	Wendell & Wild	While an stop-motion animator was working in the middle of the night, he films the model of Kat coming to life on the table and is amused by it.
2022	Trick or Treat Scooby-Doo!	In the abandoned costume factory the snack from the vending machine finally falls off.
2022	Weird: The Al Yankovic Story	In a mid-credits scene, Madonna walks over to Al's grave to put a flower on it. Suddenly, his arm reaches out to grab her, and she screams.
2022	The Woman King	The mid-credits scene is a reminder of the huge loss that the Agojie had to bear in order to protect their Kingdom. It was the dawn of a new era for the Dahomey kingdom, and they were on the path to becoming one of the most influential kingdoms in Africa.
2022	Rosaline	In a mid-credits scene, Romeo and Juliet try to find common interests on the boat.
2022	Aqua Teen Forever: Plantasm	Ignignokt and Err antagonize the viewers during an "extended credits sequence" in which Err spray paints jokes over the names in the credits.; In a post-credits scene, Markula the vampire feeds the remaining scraps of Frylock to Carl, then feeds on Shake, turning him into a vampire. Shake transforms into bat form and shouts, "I smell a sequel!" before flying at the camera with a hiss.
2022	Alienoid	In a mid-credits scene, it becomes clear that Monk Guru, the Dual Mages, and Dogturd have something else in common that caused them to be targeted by the aliens: they were all nearby when the aliens crash-landed in the past, and are therefore candidates to be the new unconscious host of the Controller. However, unbeknownst to the aliens, there was a fifth person present: Mureuk, Monk Guru's young apprentice. Mureuk rescued Yi-an from the river and the Controller took him as its new host, causing him to lose his memories of the incident; the film ends on this revelation.
2022	Captain	In a post-credits scene, a seemingly new race of Minotaurs are awakening underwater, emitting bio radio signals implying that they will return.; During the credits, "Akkrinai Naan" is sung a Collection from behind the scenes.
2022	Sardar	During the credits, Sameera is proven innocent and the government scraps One India One Pipeline. Vijay is suspended from the police force for not being able to nab Sardar alive.; In a post-credits scene, Chandra Mohan reveals to Vijay that he was the one who pulled the strings, in his suspension from the police force, and appoints Vijay to work as a spy, for RAW. Vijay is given a mission in Cambodia, with a codename.
2022	Black Panther: Wakanda Forever	Shuri travels to Haiti where she burns her funeral ceremonial robe, finally allowing herself to grieve and mourn T'Challa. There, she is met on a beach by Nakia and learns that Nakia and T'Challa have a son, Toussaint, who Nakia has been raising in secret far from the pressure of the throne. Toussaint reveals his Wakandan name is T'Challa.
2022	Blue's Big City Adventure	In a mid-credits scene, as he is getting ready for bed, Josh tells the audience that the movie is over and he and Blue sing "the So Long Song".; As the credits roll, he and Blue are side by side doing the "Happy Puppy Dance".
2022	Home Coming	In a mid-credits scene, Zong Dawi and Cheng Leng at the Beach.
2022	Spirited	During the credits, Wren has grown up and has been accepted into a masters program at Stanford ("That Christmas Morning Feelin' (Curtain Call)").; In a post-credits scene, it is revealed the hotel manager, at the Christmas tree convention is the next person chosen to be redeemed.
2022	Bhediya	In a mid-credits scene, Vicky and Bittu come to meet their long lost friend, Jana, who had previously been possessed by Stree, and has since been staying far away from them, cutting off contact from their town to study for the UPSC exam for IAS. They request Jana's help in uncovering the mystery of Stree. Suddenly, Bhaskar transforms into the werewolf and appears in front of them, leaving them terrified.; Second in a mid-credits scene, "Thumkeshwari" is sung.
2022	Puss in Boots: The Last Wish	In a pre-credits scene, Puss rekindles his romance with Kitty; with Perrito in tow, they steal a ship and head to the Kingdom of Far Far Away to visit some old friends.; After the credits roll, Puss in Boots says, "You're still here?"
2022	Violent Night	In a mid-credits scene, Bert records a video with Thorp's corpse, boasting that Santa is real.
2022	Ini Utharam	In the film credits, the SI asks how Aswin left his glasses and begins to suspect Janaki. It is revealed that while interrogating Janaki, the SP appreciated her bravery, so he decided to support her. He talked to the minister to "close the Karunan chapter." That night, three people entered the police station and killed Karunan in the presence of the SP and Janaki. At the end, Janaki is seen sitting with the minister, watching the recorded murder video.
2022	Guillermo del Toro's Pinocchio	During the credits, Sebastian sings for the Black Rabbits in the afterlife after wrapping up his narration.
2022	Thank God	During the credits, Ayaan vows to accumulate only "punya" now and be a loving, supportive and responsible family man. Ayaan gets his ancestral home repaired and hands over the keys to his sister and her husband. He also adopts the grandson of the hungry old woman who died due to Ayaan's refusal to help her. He is shown celebrating his wife and loving his family like never before.
2022	Kalaga Thalaivan	In a mid-credits scene, Thirumaaran calls Mythili Prasad's phone before falling unconscious.
2022	Love Today	In a mid-credits scene, Lawyer Venu Shastri, Saraswathi and Uthaman Pradeep winks.
2022	Fresh	A mid-credits scene depicts five of Brendan's clients in a white room, seated at a table with bleeding human meat at the center. A Satanic symbol is displayed during the end credits, indicating that Brendan and his clients are part of a Satanist organisation.
2022	Laththi	During the credits, Muruganantham reunites with Rasu and tells him to forget the incident, and they return home.
2022	Gargi	It is revealed that Gargi and her family have moved on, having reconciled with the victim and her dad.
2022	I Wanna Dance with Somebody	There are photos of the real-life characters shown for about the first 2–3 minutes of the credits.
2022	Spoiler Alert	A mid-credits scene shows a digital camera recording of the real Kit Cowan blowing bubbles.
2022	Naane Varuvean	In a post-credits scene, It is not revealed whether Kathir is dead, alive or has possessed Prabhu. When Prabhu suddenly opens his eyes, the screen cuts to black.
2022	White Noise	The movie ends with the Gladneys shopping at an A&P supermarket, where the family participates in a music video-like dance.
2022	HIT: The Second Case	In a mid-credits scene, he then marries Aarya. KD's replacement, Arjun Sarkaar, arrives to congratulate the couple hinting at a sequel.
2022	Babylon	In a mid-credits scene, A century-spanning series of vignettes from various films follows. As the focus returns to Singin', Manny tearfully smiles.
2022	Naai Sekar Returns	In a mid-credits scene, Naai Sekar sings the song "Appatha".
2022	Paradise City	A collection of bloopers and outtakes runs during the end credits.
2022	Coffee with Kadhal	In a post-credits scene, "Rum Bum Bum" is sung.
2022	The School for Good and Evil	During the credits, "Who Do You Think You Are" is sung.
2022	Kantara	In the mid-credits scene, Shiva and Leela's son asks Sundara about his father's disappearance.
2022	Ticket to Paradise	A collection of bloopers and during the ending credits.
2022	Warriors of Future	In a mid-credits scene, Tyler accepts a mission on the moon while Skunk and Cheng finish rebuilding the armoured car.
2022	Monster High: The Movie	A mysterious gypsy watches the final scene through a crystal ball, spying on Draculaura, and declares she is the key to destroying all the vampires forever and requests she be brought to her, foreshadowing Monster High 2.
2022	Blood	In a mid-credits scene, Jess is playing with a new dog until it stops and seems drawn to the woods in the same way Pippen was, indicating that whatever evil lived in the tree is still present.
2022	An Action Hero	In a mid-credits scene, "Jehda Nasha" is sung.
2022	DSP	A collection of outtakes, behind the scenes and during the end credits.
2022	The Guardians of the Galaxy Holiday Special	In a post-credits scene, Rocket and Cosmo are decorating Groot as a Christmas tree; Groot drops his arms, causing the decorations to fall off, leading Cosmo to say that Groot has accidentally ruined Christmas, and Rocket to break the fourth wall and say that now they will need to do another special.
2022	One Piece Film: Red	In the ending credits, Uta's childhood song "Where the Wind Blows" is heard and various characters over the world listen.; In the post-credits scene, Luffy sits on top of Sunny and tries to speak to it while reminiscing of Uta. Luffy and his crew continue their adventure as he proclaims his dream to become the Pirate King.
2022	The First Slam Dunk	There's a shot of a kitchen table with photos on it. The shot zooms in to show the pictures are of Sota.
2022	Daddy Daughter Trip	As the credits roll, a scene plays in which Meara asks Larry to tell her a story. He tells a story called about a frog named Jack Squat who is unappreciated by his princess owner and ends up being kissed by a different princess and turning into a prince and marrying her instead. The story is animated in a polished-up style of Meara's drawings.; After the credits, while the screen is black, Jack's voice is heard saying, "Brilliant! I love it!"
2023	House Party	A collection of bloopers, outtakes and during end credits.
2023	Dog Gone	During the credits, it was revealed that Gonker never left the Marshalls again and Fielding now lives in Chile giving kayaking tours.
2023	Thunivu	In a post-credits scene, Dark Devil and Kanmani fake their deaths and escape using sea scooters and reach their boat, settling in international waters. Dayalan and his team board a helicopter to the ship, where they find the ₹25,000 crore.; Second in a post-credits scene, "Kasethan Kaduvalada" is sung.
2023	The Amazing Maurice	The post-credits scene refers to a special remembering of Terry Pratchett.
2023	Deep Sea	The mid-credits scenes show Shenxiu waking up, heading home and reuniting with her family, growing closer with them, and finally, a teenaged Shenxiu heads to the real town where Nanhe lived, as she smiles up at his spirit in the clouds.
2023	Kids vs. Aliens	In a post-credits scene, Another alien came into Sam and Gary's destroyed house until their parents came, with no knowledge of what really happened, The alien comes from behind her and attacks her using the same slime that mutated Dallas.
2023	Pathaan	in a post-credits scene, Pathaan and Tiger are seen pondering about retiring and suggesting young agents who can replace them, but eventually decide to keep fighting the threats themselves. (Note: A metareference to the actors' careers as well, them forming part of the Khans of Bollywood.)
2023	Legion of Super-Heroes	In a post-credits scene, Kara contacts Superman about her decision to stay in the 31st century and her new relationship with Brainiac 5. After the call is ended, Superman and Batman inspect a crater in Metropolis when they are hit and apparently teleported to parts unknown by a Zeta Beam blast. (Note: The story continues in Justice League: Warworld.)
2023	The Wandering Earth 2	In a mid-credits scene, Tu's digital self is addressed by the 550W artificial intelligence, who now goes by the personified name "MOSS" (550W spun upside-down). The now-sentient MOSS claims responsibility for both of the past two crises, as well as several yet-to-happen future crises...
2023	The Great Indian Kitchen	In a mid-credits scene, showing her as an independent dance teacher portraying her pains through a dance while her ex-husband is married again and the second wife seems to meet the first one's fate and "Siru Deivam" is sung.
2023	Ant-Man and the Wasp: Quantumania	Following the death of Kang the Conqueror, numerous other variants of Kang, including Immortus, Rama-Tut and Centurion, commiserate over his death and, concerned by Earth-616's increasing interest in the multiverse, plan their multiversal uprising.; Loki and Mobius M. Mobius encounter another Kang variant, Victor Timely, at the Chicago World's Fair in 1893. (Note: As depicted in the Loki season 2 episode "1893" (2023))
2023	Mummies	The baby crocodile gets its toy back and then gives it to a lady crocodile.
2023	Tu Jhoothi Main Makkaar	In a mid-credits scene, Renu Arora, Sweetu, Nisha and Rohan.; Second in a mid-credits scene, Mickey and Tinni propose to each other, where they get married and live happily together as a family.
2023	Cocaine Bear	The first mid-credits scene shows Stache hitching a ride to New York on a goat truck with a duffel bag of cocaine, which he first stashes in the back with the goats before taking it back and eyeing them suspiciously.; The second mid-credits scene shows Eddie, accompanied by Daveed, reuniting with his son. When they notice that Rosette is chewing on something, Daveed checks his pockets and realizes that he can no longer find his fingers. He shakes his head and says, "They weren't gonna put 'em back on."
2023	Operation Fortune: Ruse de Guerre	In a mid-credits scene, villa to finance Danny's new film, about the film's events, with Danny playing Simmonds and Simmonds acting as an on set producer.
2023	Scream VI	Mindy explains that not all films need a post-credits scene.
2023	65	it shows the aftermath of the extinction thus moving forward, showing the world's evolution
2023	Shazam! Fury of the Gods	In a mid-credits scene, Billy meets Emilia Harcourt and John Economos, who attempt to recruit him on behalf of Amanda Waller to join the Justice Society.; In a post-credits scene, Thaddeus Sivana is still in prison, and encounters Mister Mind once again.
2023	Jesus Revolution	At the end of the film, the credits reveal that Smith and Frisbee reconciled and both are remembered as founders of and leaders in the widespread Jesus movement that started at Calvary Chapel.
2023	John Wick: Chapter 4	In a post-credits scene, Caine comes home to Paris to reunite with his daughter but is approached by Akira, who attempts to kill him for killing her father.
2023	Champions	A post-credit sequence shows the Friends playing a game where Showtime finally converts on a backward shot, with his teammates celebrating with him.
2023	Dungeons & Dragons: Honor Among Thieves	A mid-credits scene shows the final corpse resurrected by the talisman, still alive long after the gang has left him, pleading to be asked one more question in order to bring him back to death.
2023	Bholaa	in a mid-credits scene, Chomu Singh learns about Bholaa's release and decides to destroy him.
2023	Tetris	During the credits, home movies made by Henk Rogers are shown featuring himself, his Russian interpreter Alla, and Alexey Pajitnov.
2023	The Super Mario Bros. Movie	Before the credits, where he tells the audience that the film is over and what there is left is the infinite void. He then proceeds to play the Ground theme with his saxophone, as the credits begin to roll.; The shrunk Bowser continues the song "Peaches" from earlier in the film, but he is confronted by a toad guard.; A white egg with green spots hatches, though the screen cuts to black before the creature inside is revealed; as Yoshi (voiced by Kazumi Totaka; uncredited) says his name.
2023	Ride On	A collection of outtakes and bloopers runs during the end credits.
2023	The Pope's Exorcist	An after-credits photo of the real Amorth sticking out his tongue appears, along with his birth and death dates.
2023	Detective Conan: Black Iron Submarine	In the post-credits scene, it is revealed that Naomi's father survives the attempted murder, and Pacific Buoy project will be moved to another country. Naomi realizes that Haibara is in fact Shiho Miyano, a friend who shielded her from being bullied when they studied in the United States. The flaw in the system is revealed to have been staged by Vermouth, who disguised herself as Shiho and appeared in security camera footages to disprove the fact that Haibara is Shiho Miyano. An elderly woman whom Haibara earlier offered ticket to purchase Fusae Campbell-branded ginkgo leaf pin is revealed to be Vermouth, who says that Conan must find the reason she helped stage the flaw in the system himself.
2023	Beau Is Afraid	The shot lingers on the capsized boat in front of the now empty arena as the credits roll.
2023	Kisi Ka Bhai Kisi Ki Jaan	During the credits, "Lets Dance Chotu Motu" is sung.; In a mid-credits scene, Bhaijaan sings "Row, Row, Row Your Boat" also manages to kill Mahavir and saves his family and the colony.
2023	Sakra	In a mid-credits scene, Murong Fu is revived by his father Murong Bu. In a second mid-credits scene, Muron Bu visits Qiao Yuanshan, Qiao Feng's biological father, who survived the Leading Big Brother's attack, abandoned Qiao Feng, murdered Qiao Feng's adoptive parents and Xuanku, and saved Qiao Feng from the fight at the Heroes Gathering Manor.
2023	Rudhran	In a mid-credits scene, where he tracks down Das in Madurai and thrashes him to avenge Devaraj's death indicating a sequel.
2023	The Portable Door	a housekeeper is seen carrying a towel and uttering knock, knock, in front of a door. The screen turns black, and a whooshing sound is made, giving us a clue that the door is still active and accessible for new adventures.
2023	Quasi	In a mid-credits scene, Quasi and Duchamp hold a funeral for Michel as he requested so that he is not eaten by animals, but they have trouble fitting him into the grave due to his height.; A collection of bloopers and outtakes runs during the end credits.; In a post-credits scene, Michel's hands get eaten by dogs.
2023	Viduthalai Part 1	In the mid-credits scene, Ragavendar suspends Kumaresan for not filing an act of subordination memo, while a photographer learns about the brutal atrocities against the police department. After getting arrested, Perumal is interrogated by Sunil.
2023	Born to Fly	In a mid-credits scene, Lei Yu and his squadron perform a surprise flyby by deploying coloured smoke above a soccer field to show respect to Commander Ting's son.
2023	Agent	During the credits, Afterwards, Ricky secretly gets assigned on a new mission dubbed Rabbit Fire.
2023	Ponniyin Selvan: II	In a mid-credits scene, Vandiyadevan and Ponniyin Selvan led extensive conquests under Uttama Chola's reign. After Uttama Chola's death, Ponniyin Selvan ascends to the throne as 'Rajaraja Chola,' while the Pandyas are captured and punished.
2023	Guardians of the Galaxy Vol. 3	In a mid-credits scene, the new Guardians—Rocket, Groot, Cosmo, Kraglin, Adam Warlock, Phyla, and Blurp—are shown discussing their favorite music from Earth while waiting in a desert on another planet to undergo a new mission.; In a post-credits scene, Peter Quill, returns to Earth and reunites with his grandfather Jason.
2023	Love Again	During the credits, clips of Celine Dion performing are alternated with clips of the cast play-backing along to the music.; In a mid-credits scene, Rob records his first podcast, with Dion as a guest.
2023	Fast X	In a mid-credits scene, Luke Hobbs infiltrates an abandoned theater with a team of agents where he is contacted by Dante, who tells him that he will be his next target for killing his father. Hobbs replies that he is not hard to find, and crushes the phone Dante contacted him on with his bare hands.
2023	Thugs	During the credits, As for the twins, the escapes inmates arrange for them to make bail and "Amman" is sung.
2023	Selfiee	In a mid-credits scene, "Main Khiladi" is sung.; A montage of frame and selfie.
2023	Nefarious	In a post-credits voice-over, the voice of Nefariamus is heard to say in Latin, "You have been weighed in the balance and found wanting, but you are stupid that you do not understand. It is to be continued!" (Note: This is a general translation of the character's direct quote, which is: "Mene, Mene, techel upharsem. Autem stultus es ut non comprendias. Continuendum est!")
2023	The Roundup: No Way Out	A mid-credits scene sets up the next sequel, showing Ma Seok-do recruiting the informant Jang Yi-soo for a new investigation.
2023	Custody	In a post-credits scene, Shiva and Revathi plan for their marriage preparation.
2023	About My Father	During the credits, they celebrate Christmas together until the dog appears with the peacock's feathers: Sebastian and Salvo accuse him of killing the peacock.
2023	The Machine	While the closing credits roll, a commercial plays starring Bert and his father for Kreischer Karpets.
2023	Katak: The Brave Beluga	In a mid-credits scene, Sometime afterwards, Katak's grandmother dies and Estelle finally gives birth to a daughter of her own. As Katak welcomes the new member of the pod, Cyrano arrives to visit him.
2023	Hypnotic	In a mid-credits scene, it is shown that Dellrayne survived the encounter, having adopted the guise of Rourke's now deceased foster father. He walks towards the helicopter, presumably in pursuit of Rourke, Vivian and Minnie.
2023	Asteroid City	During the credits, the roadrunner is seen running across the screen.
2023	Transformers: Rise of the Beasts	In a mid-credits scene, Noah tries to fix Mirage.
2023	Afwaah	In a post-credit scene Rahab is recovering from his stab wound. Nivi stands for election instead of Vicky with the female police officer and Jay behind her and Rahab is seen far in the crowd. Rahab returns to his home and finds it charred.
2023	The Flash	Barry tells a drunken Arthur Curry about his experiences traveling the multiverse.
2023	Kasethan Kadavulada	A collection of Behind the scenes and outtakes.
2023	Bloody Daddy	During the credits, While talking with Aditi about exposing more drug dealers, Atharva finds drug packets in Sumair's car, thus revealing that Sumair is also involved in drug smuggling. Atharva keeps quiet about this, where he and Sumair leave for a short trip
2023	Elemental	During the end credits, Bernie enjoys his time with Cinder in his retirement, Ember makes Wade a glass sculpture of himself with a big muscular body like the one he unintentionally made back when he first came into the Fireplace, Cinder reads Gale and Fern's love fortune, Clod dates the fire girl he flirted with, a water woman makes an earth man's hair grow tall quickly like trees while the two kiss, the Lumen couple and the other Ripples become close friends, Lutz and the Windbreakers play another airball game Gale, Fern, Cinder and Bernie attend, and Ember and Wade eventually return to Element City after an unknown amount time of traveling together.
2023	Nimona	Nimona sprays paints the letter A to form a heart.
2023	I Love You	In a mid-credits scene, Satya Prabhakar walking.
2023	The Out-Laws	Owen Browning gives Billy and Lilly McDermont a slice of a wedding cake and Billy eats it.
2023	Insidious: The Red Door	The light above the now-sealed red door begins to flicker.
2023	They Cloned Tyrone	In Los Angeles, Tyrone watches TV with his friends and sees one of Fontaine's clones actually belongs to Tyrone.
2023	Sound of Freedom	An epilogue states that Tim Ballard testified before the United States Congress and claims that his testimony resulted in laws being passed that require the government to cooperate with foreign countries on sex trafficking investigations. The epilogue also claims that there are more people enslaved today than at any other time in history, including when slavery was legal.
2023	Hidden Strike	Chinese forces take control of the tanker containing the stolen oil.; Xiao Wei, Luo Feng, and Chris help local villagers repair a well, after which Luo Feng warns Xiao Wei to stay away from Chris. The Chinese forces from the previous scene arrive and inform Luo Feng that there is a new mission. Luo Feng asks Chris if he wants to join, after which they bump fists.; A collection of bloopers and outtakes runs during the rest of the credits.
2023	Mission: Impossible – Dead Reckoning Part One	At the end of the credits, the Entity's noise is again heard.
2023	Killing Romance	A post-credits scene shows Jonathan, sunburnt and dehydrated, calling hopelessly for his bodyguard as he floats in the middle of the ocean.
2023	Mavka: The Forest Song	Kylina finds the Tree of Life and bathes in its power, but is de-aged into a baby as a result.
2023	Teenage Mutant Ninja Turtles: Mutant Mayhem	The Turtles are shown enjoying high school life: Michaelangelo is participating in the school's comedy improv team, Raphael has joined the wrestling team, Donatello has found the computer club, and Leonardo (who, throughout the film, has developed a crush on April) has decided to help her with her journalistic interests, now focused on TCRI who have mysteriously disappeared since the events of the film. While the five are later enjoying themselves at the school prom, Cynthia, who is spying on them (and with Superfly by her side) decides that the focus is to capture the Turtles by bringing in Shredder.
2023	Gran Turismo	There is more of the action at Polyphony Digital as engineers research real cars for their game.
2023	The Three Musketeers: D'Artagnan	In a mid-credits scene, Milady speaks to the Cardinal, revealing that the Musketeers are her adversaries.
2023	Maaveeran	In a mid-credits scene, However, Sathya is attacked by the collapse and presumed dead, but is revived. In the aftermath, Sathya writes another episode on Maaveeran.
2023	Red, White & Royal Blue	Alex and Henry just after they toppled the towering royal wedding cake. In the extra beat, Alex asks Henry if anyone noticed — a playful callback to the moment that sparked their relationship — and Henry responds with a characteristic annoyed expression.
2023	Strays	Dr. Hagen tells a hospitalized Doug that his penis reattachment failed, much to the latter's dismay.
2023	Jailer	In a post-credits scene, As Muthuvel solemnly walks away, he recalls memories of Arjun and Rithvik and he discards the necklace that holds Arjun's tooth.
2023	Blue Beetle	A distorted recording from Ted Kord broadcasts in his laboratory, stating that he is still alive and that he wishes for his daughter Jenny to be informed of this news.; A clip from the stop-motion version of El Chapulín Colorado that Rudy used to distract the Kord Estate guards is shown.
2023	Gadar 2	In a mid-credits scene, Iqbal captures them in an ambush and kills Muskaan's brother Farid. Iqbal tries to execute them but Tara frees himself and with Jeete fights the army singlehandedly, escaping with everybody in an army tank. They arrive at the Indian border, where Iqbal again tries to kill Tara, but is gunned down by Rawat and the Indian soldiers. Rawat approves Jeete to enlist in the army, while Tara, Jeete and Muskaan reunite with Sakeena.
2023	The Slumber Party	The credits reveal that Paige accidentally hit Anna Maria in the nose, explaining the blood, and that Jake was present when his house was TPd, bonding with Megan right away.
2023	My Animal	Otto is being interviewed on the news and says "You can't mess with animals, man. Cardinal rule."
2023	Bhola Shankar	A scene runs during the credits showing a press conference where it is announced that the trafficking mafia has been stopped and many women have been returned to their families. A reporter asks who achieved this, and the shot cuts to Bhola Shankar.
2023	Theater Camp	The film has a mid-credits scene in which Joan wakes up, begging to (unfortunately for her) no-one to not let Troy run the camp in her absence. The lady next to her, who Troy had mistaken for his mother, turns to her, talking to her about the show she just watched about Joan's life before she fell into her coma. Joan then asks if the lady knows why she is in the hospital, to which the lady replies "Nope!"; The track "Bye Class", which is implied to be one of the songs made by Rebecca-Diane and Amos earlier in the movie, as Rebecca-Diane sings it, is heard over the final seconds of the movie. Rebecca ends it by saying she'll see the class next week or tomorrow, and thanks them, and by proxy, the audience for coming.
2023	You Are So Not Invited to My Bat Mitzvah	Stacy, Lydia, and their friends open a bake sale at their school to save a retirement home.
2023	Kushi	In the post-credits scene, it is shown that both of them have been blessed with a baby daughter, choosing to name her as "Kushi".
2023	The Blackening	First the survivors try to decide what to do now that they have survived the night. Someone suggests calling the police. After a moment, they all laugh and think of another solution. Then Dewayne goes over his idea of calling the firemen because "they won't shoot you." Then sirens approach, and then the group is hit by a stream of water from a firehose.
2023	Bottoms	Bloopers are shown.
2023	Retribution	During the credits, the news reports state that the bombings were part of the heist perpetrated by Anders, and Matt cooperates with the Europol to respond the incident.
2023	The Moon	First, the idiotic Minister of Space gleefully runs to and greets astronaut Sun-woo as he gets off the plane bringing him home to Korea. Next, Sun-woo returns the stuffed animal to Lee Sang-won's son, who asks him if his dad really is on the moon. Son-woo answers yes, then gives Sang-won's wife the picture with their new baby's name written on the back. It is her name, written backwards.; Later, Kim Jae-guk and his intern are getting ready to entertain a bunch of kids visiting their observatory. While checking out a mock spacesuit, they see an announcement on the news that Jae-guk's ex, Yoon Moon-young, has been named the new director of NASA. Later, Jae-guk greets the children and is upset when they run to the person in the spacesuit and start yanking the tubes out. The intern suddenly appears, and Jae-guk is surprised and wonders who is in the suit. The astronaut removes the helmet to reveal that it is Sun-woo, who greets Jae-guk with a salute.
2023	Back on the Strip	Outtakes are shown.
2023	Jawan	During the post-credits scene, STF officer Madhavan Naik, who helped Azad in the completion of his missions, assigns him a new mission targeting Swiss banks in "Not Ramaiya Vastavaiya" is sung.; Azad says, "Ready".
2023	The Nun II	During the credits, flashes appear spelling out the name "Valak," reminding viewers the demon isn't gone.; In a post-credits scene, Ed and Lorraine Warren revive a phone call from Father Gordon asking them for help.
2023	The Pod Generation	The founder of Pegazus is being interviewed and says the company has always been customer-obsessed. He tells the interviewer that the customer is the baby, and he hopes that one day children will be able to choose their parents and says that his advice to them will be choose your parents wisely.
2023	Creation of the Gods I: Kingdom of Storms	In a mid-credits scene, Daji rushes to King Shou's body and uses her fox spirit power to resuscitate him, who is suddenly revived.; In the post-credits scene, Jiang Ziya is angling alone on Wei River and shocked to see a flock of crows homing on his location; Wen Zhong, the Grand Preceptor of Shang dynasty who has been away at war for ten years, returns to the capital along with his superpowered generals including the Four Demonic Giants.
2023	Rocky Aur Rani Kii Prem Kahaani	In a mid-credits scene, Tijori, a changed man, visits the Chatterjee household to apologise. Rocky and Rani finally get married and Dhanlakshmi sends the secret recipe of their sweets to Rani, accepting her as a family member, but does not attend the wedding.
2023	Zoey 102	A mid-credits scene shows Todd putting a squirming bag in the trunk of his car, implying that Stacey and Mark's suspicions that he is the killer are correct.
2023	Barbie	Exclusively on the IMAX release, there is a meta post-credits scene featuring Helen Mirren as herself walking in on Midge, played by Emerald Fennell, giving birth.
2023	The Inventor	This movie has several.: Leonardo (voiced by Stephen Fry) speaks to the audience and says "I'm trying not to sound like Alec Guinness, but 'these aren't the droids you want.'" while waving his arm like Obi-Wan Kenobi.; There are a lot of snarky comments throughout the credits. When the first two producers are named, there's a pencil sketch of them with one asking the other to look in the couch for spare funding. Under the credits for Jason and the Argonauts animation, the quote "Skeleton fight! Need I say more?" is attributed to Leonardo da Vinci. Someone was credited as someone's "Gin Rummy Partner".; At the end, there's a disclaimer saying no puppets were hurt during filming.; After all of the above, The Pope appears and says that you really got your money's worth with the vibrato and singing, and saying it's worth ten quid.
2023	Haunted Mansion	During the credits, Ben returns to teaching and adopts a stray cat named Tater Tot, a nod to his wife's love for the snack. The group reunites on Halloween for a party at the mansion with the happy haunts.
2023	The Volunteers: To the War	In a mid-credits scene, Mao Zedong, Li Xiao, Peng Dehuai, Army Crowds Brothers.
2023	Saw X	Jigsaw and Detective Hoffman capture the cancer patient who lied to John about the procedure in Mexico and hook him up to a trap.
2023	Fukrey 3	In a post-credits scene, Choocha urinates the diamond in ice form from the plane and the diamond is found by Zafar on a beach in Goa.; During the credits, "Ve Furkey" is sung.
2023	Dark Harvest	In a mid-credits scene, the farmer removes Richie's buried body to prepare him as the next Sawtooth but is killed by Richie's father. Richie transforms into Sawtooth and is told by his father to burn everything down.
2023	Chandramukhi 2	In a mid-credits scene, Ranganayaki's family finally perform a prayer in their deity temple. After finishing their prayer, the family leave the palace with Pandiyan. Pandiyan reunites with Lakshmi. The movie ends with a hint of a sequel.; As the credits roll, a collection of Behind the scenes and P. Vasu.
2023	Five Nights at Freddy's	Balloon Boy is shown appearing inside a taxi driver's car.; At the end of the credits, a musical box begins to be heard, so that later a robotic voice begins to spell "Come, Find Me" ending the movie.
2023	Leo	In a post-credits scene, as peace returns to Parthi's life, he gets a phone call. The caller reveals that he knows Parthi is Leo and tells him that destroying only his family's datura factory was not enough to make the society drug-free as drugs are rampant all over India. The caller also says that he knows Parthi recognises his identity, (Note: Agent Vikram from Vikram (2022).) as Parthi sighs in exasperation.; First As the credits roll, Lokiverse 2.0 playing.; Rolex: Sir, Just Sir; Karnan / Vikram: Shall we start.; Second As the credits roll, "Lokiverse 2.0" is sung.
2023	Ganapath	In a post-credits scene, Guddu challenges Dalini to a fight, thus hinting a sequel titled Ganapath 2: Rise of the Hero.; During the credits, the songs "Jai Ganesha" and "Hum Aaye Hain" is sung.
2023	Taylor Swift: The Eras Tour	They end the show with "Karma", amidst confetti and fireworks. "Long Live (Taylor's Version)" plays during the end credits.
2023	Nyad	As the credits roll, there are clips of the real Diana Nyad during her post-swim media blitz telling her story to throngs of adoring fans. To some, the message of Nyad is that dreams can be accomplished by having Diana's persistence.
2023	The Marvels	Monica Rambeau awakens in a hospital-like room and is excited to see her dead mother, Maria Rambeau, next to her. However, Maria does not recognize her, when Dr. Hank McCoy / Beast enters and tells Monica she was found in space by Binary (Maria) and that they believe Monica is in a parallel universe.
2023	Tiger 3	In the post-credits scene, Colonel Sunil Luthra contacts Kabir Dhaliwal, who is in Japan and assigns him to assassinate an unidentified enemy, setting the stage for a new war.
2023	Jigarthanda DoubleX	In the post-credits scene, Kirubakaran returns home to be with Malaiyarasi and Caesar' son, where Paingili and Kirubakaran name him as Sethu, as per Malaiyarasi's vow to Goddess Sethukaali Amman. An anonymous man secretly follows Paingili and Sethu, where he mentions to another man sitting in a car that they will eliminate the last remaining members of Caesar' family.
2023	Wish	After the credits, Sabino plays the song "When You Wish Upon A Star" from Pinocchio on his guitar while looking at the stars.
2023	Once Upon a Studio	At the end of the credits, a dedication to the late Burny Mattinson reads "For our pal Burny and his 70 years of legendary storytelling at Disney Animation."
2023	Trolls Band Together	In a mid-credits scene, Tiny was relaxing in the sun talking to Mr. Dinkles about his adventure with Branch and Poppy to reunite BroZone and save Floyd whilst on a journey to adulthood, but decides to remain a baby until Mr. Dinkles tells Tiny that he has no network.; In a post-credits voice-over, Oh Wow!
2023	Leo	An animatic version of the song Last Year was shown.; A drawing of a lizard like Leo wearing a baseball gear and holding a flag with the words "In memory of our friend James Cordero."
2023	Tiger Nageswara Rao	In a mid-credits scene, the film inevitably glorifies the dacoit and his every action.
2023	Bhagavanth Kesari	During the credits, Bhagavanth keeps himself at risk, and Viji soon turns violent to safeguard him. Bhagavanth finally kills Rahul and his men, while Viji is selected into the Army, fulfilling her father's and Bhagavanth's dream.; In a post-credits scene, "Danchave" is sung.
2023	Garudan	In the post-credits scene, Minister Mathew and his private secretary are traveling in their vehicle and are blocked by a broke-down truck in an isolated area. Harish approaches Minister Mathew and asks if he's seen the movie 'John Wick', showing Drake's photo. The vehicle instantly gets locked with Minister Mathew and his private secretary inside and the driver missing, which draws fear in them of what is to come next.
2023	Good Burger 2	During the credits, Charlotte comes to visit Dexter and Mia and Dexter is allowed to apologize to her. Ed and Ed 2 reveal to Dexter that they figured out how to make permanent ice and Good Burger successfully sells it to Mark Cuban, making $10 million.
2023	Animal	During the credits, Vijay was saddened about losing his father to the illness. However, he was eventually rejoices in happiness for attaining his newfound bond of affliction to his son, Abhay.; In the first post-credits scene, Aziz completes his plastic surgery to look identical to Vijay. A pregnant Zoya remains uncertain whether Vijay or Aziz is the father while Aziz brutally slays two of Vijay's cousins and proposes marriage to Abrar's third widow. The text then states, "Animal Park" appear on the screen along with a "visit soon" hinting at a sequel.; In the second post-credits scene, an Elderly Vijay appears before cut to the "A Film By Sandeep Reddy Vanga" text appears on the black screen.
2023	Your Lucky Day	A police dog outside of the abandoned G Wagon is shown.; Angus Cloud's character Sterling says, "We are all going to get away with this. Because after today, we are all rich."
2023	Thanksgiving	A blooper is shown of a previous scene from the film featuring Nell Verlaque and Rick Hoffman in which the camera holds on Hoffman until he smirks and gives the finger to the camera and the director finally yells, "Cut!"
2023	Family Switch	A collection of outtakes.
2023	Next Goal Wins	After the credits, Taika Waititi's character offers up an epilogue, book-ending the introduction he gave at the start of the movie. He claims that anything can happen with a little faith, then attempts to walk across water, immediately stepping into the water and cursing.
2023	Sugar Factory	During the credits, A Collection of behind the scenes, "Sugar Factory" is sung.
2023	Godzilla Minus One	As the credits are ending, Godzilla's footsteps, followed by his roar, are heard.
2023	Candy Cane Lane	One year later in the mid-credits, Pepper is then shown to have been turned into a glass figurine by Santa as punishment where her good behavior will return her to the reindeer poop-scooping rank. Chris is revealed to have gained ownership of his store, now renamed "Chris Kringle's".
2023	Wonka	During the credits, Lofty shows footage of Wonka's friends returning to their old lives, while Affable leads the arrest of Scrubitt and Bleacher.
2023	Aquaman and the Lost Kingdom	In a post-credits scene, Arthur and Orm are enjoying hamburger and beer, as stated earlier in the movie by the former. Suddenly, a cockroach walks on the table. Orm sees it then puts it in his burger, much to the disgust of his brother.
2023	Extra Ordinary Man	In a mid-credits scene, Vijay assigns Abhi a new task to capture an international gangster.
2023	Anyone but You	The cast are singing "Unwritten", while a scene shows Jonathan and Margaret, who are implied to have entered a relationship.; As the credits end, there is a faint groan.
2023	Noryang: Deadly Sea	Crown Prince Gwanghae is in his castle with his top military leaders. They convey Admiral Yi's last words. Then his Army Commander comes in and announces that Suncheon's Yegyo Fortress has been reclaimed, effectively ending the war. The prince reflects on the violence that took place, and looks into the sky at the leader's star. He explains the two reasons why the star seems so bright in the daylight: there's a message yet to be told, or a deed yet to be done.
2023	Conjuring Kannappan	During the credits, the movie chronicles how Kannappan tries to resolve this unique problem and save himself, his family, and friends.
2023	Salaar: Part 1 – Ceasefire	In the post-credits scene, Salaar appears just as his loyalists learn that he is a Shouryaanga tribesman.
2023	Dunki	In the post-credits scene, Hardy, Balli, and Buggu meet an agent who offers them to go to London through the Dunki route. Hardy throws him to the ground and then all three of them walk away.
2023	The Family Plan	During the credits, the Morgans have returned to their lives in Buffalo; Dan now runs a security firm to train clients how to better defend against attacks while Jessica coaches high school track and field. They then load up a rented RV to embark on a cross-country road trip to take Nina to Stanford.
2023	Dicks: The Musical	A collection of bloopers and outtakes runs throughout the end credits, ending with brief footage of Josh Sharp and Aaron Jackson performing as Harris and Evelyn at UCB Theatre NYC in 2015.
2023	Mangalavaaram	In a mid-credits scene, there are so many confessions noted regarding illicit affairs in the other villages that create tension in those areas. Then, it is shown that Sailaja and Ravi's ghosts are in the same well where they had died, which hints towards a sequel.
2023	The Shift	In a post-credits scene, Kristoffer Polaha (who portrays Kevin in the film) thanks all viewers for watching the film and briefly mentions the inspirations for its screenplay and behind its production.
2023	Rebel Moon	In a post-credits scene, Noble's corpse is recovered by Motherworld forces, and he is resurrected after having spoken on an astral plane with Balisarius, who demands that Noble end the insurgency against him and bring Kora to him alive so he can execute her himself.
2023	Somebody I Used to Know	In a mid-credits scene, a commercial for Dessert Island Season 4: The Dess-Hurt Locker in the style of The Hurt Locker is shown.
2023	Migration	A montage of images.
2023	The Hill	In a mid-credits scene, he signs with the Montreal Expos in 1975 and plays four seasons in the minor leagues before his spine gives out.
2023	The Burial	After the closing credits Willie E. Gary in person appears in a cameo.
2023	Sylvanian Families the Movie: A Gift from Freya	A storybook-styled flipbook plays of some new siblings in Freya's family being born, and the dad building a sled during the winter.
2024	Mean Girls	Regina George appears on screen, saying "You're next. You just need to change... everything.
2024	Fighter	In the post-credits scene, Minni and Patty, embrace celebrating victory.; Second in the post-credits scene, "Ishq Jaisa Kuch" is sung.
2024	Argylle	In a mid-credits scene, it's revealed that the first novel is based on Argylle's life, with a flashback sequence revealing that a young Argylle had collaborated with the Kingsman franchise, and an end-titlecard is shown stating: "ARGYLLE BOOK ONE THE MOVIE COMING SOON".
2024	Guntur Kaaram	In a post-credits scene, a desperate Venkata Swamy unsuccessfully ponders with Narayana about engaging with Ramana to bring him into the political party, but Narayana laughs at him.
2024	Self	During the credits, art of Self removing her gold pieces and reattaching her wooden ones are shown
2024	The Tiger's Apprentice	In a mid-credits scene, Tom, as a result of containing part of Hu's soul, is able to transform into a tiger.
2024	Ayalaan	In a post-credits scene, Tamizh rescued a man from drowning by running on water. This indicates that the Tattoo has left his powers for Tamizh permanently.
2024	Captain Miller	In a mid-credits scene, Rajadhipathi's daughter, Princess Shakunthala, learns about Velmathi's involvement in her father and brother's death from a sly Kanagasabai. She sets out to exact vengeance on her, Eesa, Rafiq, Sengolan, and the other revolutionaries.
2024	Bob Marley: One Love	A pre-credit montage shows clips of the real Bob Marley and his band during the performance, which sees them joined on-stage by the heads of both of Jamaica's political parties, also revealing that Marley and his band were able to perform in Zimbabwe to celebrate the nation's independence before he died of his cancer in 1981.
2024	Megamind vs. the Doom Syndicate	In a mid-credits scene, the Doom Syndicate are imprisoned again, when they are visited by Megamind's ex-mentor, Machiavillain.
2024	Article 370	End credits highlight real-world images depicting post-abrogation stability and development in Kashmir.
2024	The Moon Thieves	In the mid-credits scene, Vincent reveals that the three Picasso watches given to Uncle were actually frankenwatches, and he proudly displays the real watches to his crewmates. Meanwhile, Uncle, unaware of the deception, attempts to sell the frankenwatches to a Russian crime lord who quickly discovers that the watches are fake. Uncle's henchman immediately abandons him, leaving a horrified Uncle at the Russians' gunpoint.
2024	Hanu-Man	In a post-credits scene, who emerges from the Himalayas and appears before Hanumanthu, signalling the beginning of a great battle.
2024	Ricky Stanicky	During the credits, videos and pictures are shown with Ricky and others cleaning the environment, Carly donating her hair to children, JT brushing his teeth outside near his porta-potty while Susan and Whitaker watch, everyone posing at Dean and Erin's wedding, and a viral TikTok remix made with Summerhayes' comedic jerking motions at various conferences.
2024	Kung Fu Panda 4	In a mid-credits scene, Po, along with the Furious Five, Tigress, Monkey, Mantis, Viper, and Crane, help Zhen train to become the next Dragon Warrior.
2024	Shaitaan	In a mid-credits scene, Kabir tells Vanraj that he has no idea as to what length a father can go to protect his family. Kabir leaves the place, while Vanraj's screams at the isolated place.
2024	Road House	In a mid-credits scene, Knox punches staff as he leaves the hospital wearing nothing but a hospital gown.
2024	Ghostbusters: Frozen Empire	In a mid-credits scene, a trucker gets out of his Stay Puft Marshmallows branded truck to make a purchase from a vending machine. The Mini-Pufts steal the semi in his absence.
2024	Eagle	In a mid-credits scene, his true identity becomes public, and though he survives, his peaceful life is lost. The film ends on an open note, hinting at more battles ahead for Eagle, possibly setting up a sequel.; These scenes flash quick epilogues that dive into the protagonist's ongoing missions and lay the groundwork for the sequel, Eagle Part 2: Yuddha Kaanda
2024	Outlaw Posse	In a mid-credits scene, Chief and his posse admire the countryside. "Sure is beautiful country," says Carson. "It sure is," replies Chief.
2024	Civil War	During the credits, the developing photo of the WF soldiers smiling and standing over the President's corpse appears.
2024	Yodha	In a mid-credits scene, the Indian Head of State officially reinstates the Yodha task force after Arun is rewarded for his bravery and actions.
2024	The Casagrandes Movie	A montages for images and during the end credits.
2024	The People's Joker	After the credits, the audience are told that Joker will return in The People's Nightmare: Freddy vs Joker and the glove of Freddy Krueger appears on screen.
2024	Bade Miyan Chote Miyan	In a post-credits scene, The team leaves the base while Kabir survives, hinting at a sequel.; During the credits, the songs "Wallah Habibi" and "Rang Ishq Ka" are sung.
2024	Maidaan	Photos and possibly video clips of the actual elderly players (like the legendary Syed Abdul Rahim and his team) are shown.
2024	Sting	In a first mid-credits scene, it is revealed that the dog Bonnie survived being taken by Sting.; In a second mid-credits scene, in Helga's apartment she shushes at the camera. This is the same exact scene from earlier, but with different lighting. Helga's positioning and the timing of the movie she is watching show that this is the same footage.
2024	The Family Star	In the post-credits scene, It is revealed that Indu is at that wedding. Govardhan defeats the politician's goons along with his grandmother, wins back Indu, and marries her at the end in "Kalyana Vaacha Vaacha" is sung.
2024	Woody Woodpecker Goes to Camp	In a mid-credits scene, after accidentally crash-landing their helicopter upon realizing the chest had nothing but rocks, Buzz and his escaped cellmate accomplice named Darren find themselves outside a police station, and as Buzz tries to tell his Darren that the only thing that mattered was that they were free, the police show up, and although Buzz tries to play innocent, it shortly turns to a defeated sad face as he and Darren are rearrested and returned to prison.
2024	Manjummel Boys	In a post-credits scene, Siju is awarded a medal which is shown along with the photos and story of the real Manjummel Boys.
2024	Justice League: Crisis on Infinite Earths – Part One	In a post-credits scene, Supergirl sees her friends from the Legion of Super-Heroes (including her lover Brainiac 5) begin to disappear, ending the first part on a cliffhanger. (Note: The story continues in Part Two.)
2024	Unfrosted	A Collection for bloopers and outtakes.
2024	Wildcat	The final on-screen text after the credits is her quotation about her gratitude to thousands of pigs whose pituitary glands were used for making the lupus injections that kept her alive.
2024	Aranmanai 4	In a post-credits scene, "Achocho" is sung.
2024	The Fall Guy	The end credits play over a montage of behind-the-scenes footage of the real stunt work involved in making the film.; In a mid-credits scene, Gail and Tom survive the crash, but authorities arrive to detain them. Tom leaves Gail to be arrested in order to call his agent, accidentally triggering a series of radio-controlled pyrotechnics and blowing himself up. Alma calls Momoa's agent.
2024	Spy x Family Code: White	Frankie arrives with the cherry liqueur the Forger's requested, only to discover that the Forgers had left Frigis ages before he arrived.
2024	City Hunter	The message board shows only the letter "XYZ" written vertically before the background fades to black.
2024	The Ministry of Ungentlemanly Warfare	A montage of details before the end credits reveal the post operation activities of several protagonists: Gus became a war hero and would helm several similar raids during the war before marrying Marjorie at the start of her acting career; Appleyard would receive several commendations for his role in the mission, much to the king's amusement; Hayes would go on to become a highly accomplished spy notable for surviving a year of Nazi torture without breaking; Lassen would go on to take part in raids outside the group until his death in 1945; Ian Fleming, who had been part of Gubbins's inner circle during this time, would use Operation Postmaster as the inspirational basis for his James Bond novels.
2024	Stockholm Bloodbath	After the credits, a picture of Hemming Gadh with his head on a chopping block is shown as a title card reads, "By the way... Hemming Gadh was sent to Finland on a new mission where he was beheaded by order of King Kristian who never actually trusted him." An order is given to execute, and an executioner shouts, "Yes, sir!" Gadh's head is chopped off and the stump of his neck bleeds.
2024	The Garfield Movie	There are drawings of Otto and Ethel's love life, followed by a storyboard of Jinx's villain song "I'm Back", and drawings of Garfield and Odie when they were little.; A Garfield comic strip appears on screen, with Garfield asking the audience why they are still here and believes that they are waiting for the sequel.
2024	IF	A montage of clips of Louis the teddy bear is shown, followed by a title card reading: "In loving memory of our friend, Louis Gossett Jr."
2024	Big City Greens the Movie: Spacecation	During the credits, Gwendolyn is booed for abandoning Earth and leaving the Greens and Voyd to suffer, while Voyd becomes the captain of the BigTech space fleet.
2024	Audrey's Children	During the credits, footage is shown of the real Dr. Audrey Evans speaking a message of hope to parents. Her message concludes, "And if you see this movie, do remember that it's not the end."
2024	Inside Out 2	As the credits roll, Riley's parents ask her how her hockey camp went, to which Ennui makes Riley reply "It was good." in order to deflect any of the bad things Riley did on camp. Riley's response triggers both her parents' version of Anxiety, but her Dad's version is soothed by his other emotions putting a game on their projection.; In a post-credits scene, Joy frees Riley's Deep Dark Secret, which is revealed to be Riley burning a hole in the rug, from The Vault, but he quickly shuts himself back in.
2024	Ultraman: Rising	Kenji Sato picks up his watch and hears that his mother is still alive in Nebula M78, ordering him to bring her home.
2024	Boy Kills World	In a post-credits scene, Boy and Maina are revealed eating cereal together.
2024	Furiosa: A Mad Max Saga	During the credits, various clips from Mad Max: Fury Road are shown alongside some newly filmed shots recreating moments or elements from that film, including a shot of Nux's bird bobblehead.
2024	Munjya	In a mid-credits scene, Jana brings some clothes for Bhaskar aka Bhediya to wear as he is stranded naked in the jungle, presumably after being transformed into a werewolf the previous night. He wears underwear from a brand named Munni which Munjya observes.
2024	Young Woman and the Sea	The intertitles before the film's closing credits inform that Gertrude Ederle set the world record for crossing the English Channel at 14 hours and 31 minutes, beating the world record held by a man by two hours. She eventually lost her hearing and dedicated her life to teaching deaf children to swim, dying in 2003 at the age of 98.
2024	Wonderland	In a mid-credits scene, Hyeon-soo introduces his mother to the Wonderland version of Yong-sik.
2024	Garudan	In the end credits, it is shown that Thangapandi had been fatally injured in a road accident.
2024	MaXXXine	The film lacks a traditional post-credits scene but includes notable elements during and after the credits. During the credits, a striking tracking shot pans out from the studio filming "The Puritan II" and through Los Angeles, while after the credits, a brief tag features a videotape with the message "be kind, rewind" as a nod to the VHS era and the film's 1980s setting.
2024	The Bikeriders	The film includes special content during the credits. In the first minute, the film shows photographs from Danny Lyon's 1968 book The Bikeriders, giving viewers a glimpse into the true story that inspired the movie and highlighting how closely some scenes match Lyon's original images, bridging the gap between the film and its historical inspiration.
2024	Kalki 2898 AD	In a mid-credits scene, Yaskin uses the serum drop extracted from Sumathi's foetus on himself, partially gaining the power of the unborn Kalki and becoming a youthful superhuman with four new magical limbs. He picks up Arjuna's bow, Gandiva, and pledges to personally capture Sumathi and her child to reshape the world.
2024	Despicable Me 4	Before the credits, Ralph wakes up still stuck inside the vending machine that he got into earlier, but he manages to get out, only for the machine to accidentally press the lockdown button in which hides the safe house underground, much to his disappointment.; Just a small stinger with a sleeping Mega Minion getting zapped awake and flying off.
2024	Kinds of Kindness	The end credits scene features R.M.F. eating a sandwich. This brief comedic scene appears about 45 seconds into the end credits. The post-credits scene is not directly tied to the film's plot but is related to the title of the last segment of the movie.
2024	Love Me	In a mid-credits scene, Then it is revealed that the person who Arjun united with on one of the nights, during his stay in the apartment is the ghost of real Divyavathi which is still in the apartment.
2024	Bad Boys: Ride or Die	In the post-credits scene, the whole movie rewinds to the year 305 BC, alluding to one of Marcus' delirious ramblings to Mike from earlier in the film. Marcus is bringing along a donkey through the wilderness while berating it. The donkey then pushes Marcus down, and Mike's voice can be heard interspersed with the donkey's grunts, laughing and telling off Marcus.
2024	Deadpool & Wolverine	A tribute to Fox's X-Men franchise, along with the other Fox's superhero films as the credits roll set to "Good Riddance" by Green Day.; In a post-credits scene, Wade Wilson returns to the TVA headquarters to clear his name regarding Johnny Storm's death by unveiling footage of Johnny having actually said the insults Wilson quoted about Cassandra Nova.
2024	Indian 2	In the mid-credits scene, Senapathy introduces his parents, Veerasekaran Balram and Dhakshayini, to his followers, who, like him, were also freedom fighters during the British Raj in the 1890s and he is planning to bring new changes in India along with Chitra's and his friend's help. Their back stories will take place in Indian 3.
2024	Successor	In a mid-credits scene, His brother's plan is revealed to be an effort to climb mountains in the Himalayas. While running a marathon in Paris, Jiye repeatedly stops to collect water bottles as he did in his childhood.
2024	Trap	In a mid-credits scene, Jamie is watching the news and is stunned to learn that Cooper is the Butcher.
2024	Twisters	A closing montage shows that Kate, Javi, and Tyler have joined in a new business and that Ben's story focused on Kate instead of Tyler.
2024	Harold and the Purple Crayon	In a mid-credits scene, G'Garaur finds Zerry and swears that nothing in the world shall tear them asunder. She tells him that she is already seeing someone, then leaves with Gondaldemor. G'Garaur lies, "That's cool. I'm super busy anyway!"
2024	AMFAD All My Friends Are Dead	In a mid-credits scene, Sarah receives a phone call from the original killer, who threatens to kill everybody she knows.
2024	Borderlands	In a mid-credits scene, Claptrap shows off some dance moves before the scrolling credits push him upward off the screen as he complains about not being able to give the people what they want with his Easter egg.
2024	My Spy: The Eternal City	In a mid-credits scene, JJ and David, not sure what do, decide to run as the finches chase them.
2024	The Instigators	In a mid-credits scene, Besegai and Dechico are found frozen to death in the Canadian wilderness.
2024	Watchmen Chapter I	During the end credits, the viewer hears radio recordings of old superheroes from the 1940s.; In a post-credits scene, a trailer for the second chapter of the film is shown.
2024	Fly Me to the Moon	During the credits, the Apollo 11 astronauts safely return to Earth.
2024	Sarfira	In a mid-credits scene, Vir notices that flights from smaller destinations like Pune and Vijayawada are still operational under Deccan Air. Realizing that his vision is still alive, he smiles, determined to rebuild his airline and continue his mission of making air travel accessible to all.
2024	Jackpot!	A collection of bloopers and outtakes, interspersed with three mid-credits scenes, runs during the end credits. The mid-credits scenes reveal that Katie and Noel have bought a superyacht, acknowledging that money has changed them, while MGK orders a panic room inside his panic room as well as more darts, and the Grand Lottery prepares to expand across the country.
2024	Stree 2	In a mid-credits scene, Bhaskar warns Jana of a vampire living in Delhi who sucks blood out of the people with its teeth. He adds that he likes her.; First during the credits, "Aayi Nai" is sung.; In a post-credits scene, the descendant of Chandrabhan anonymously receives a vessel containing the remains of Sarkata and absorbs its energy, transforming into a powerful being.; Second during the credits, "Khoobsurat" is sung.
2024	Vaazha – Biopic of a Billion Boys	In a mid-credits scene, a cheeky teaser for "Vaazha II: Biopic of a Billion Bros" promises that their story isn't over yet.
2024	Decoded	In a mid-credits scene, Rong Jingzhen, Liseiwcz and Turning on the lights.
2024	Incoming	The principal shows the still-burned Mr. Studebaker a video of him breathing fire at the party.
2024	Demonte Colony 2	In a post-credits scene, Srini vows to find him, his family, and their connection to Demonte, and end this sinister cycle to rescue his brother, Raghu, and break the curse by June 6, 2027.
2024	Afraid	During the end credits, a YouTube video of Alan Chikin Chow demonstrating AIA's functions is shown.
2024	Stream	In the mid-credits, another Stream activity is being filmed at the Atrium movie theater. After two people are killed and an older man is knocked out trying to get in, a woman named Sofia has a noose around her neck as a wheelchair-using man in the same plague doctor mask identifies himself as "Lockwood". He and his associate are part of the Stream as the associate use the electric chair on the older man before preparing to do away with Sofia.
2024	Reagan	A post-credits scene features a photo of the letter by Prince Hussain, who had sent Ronald Reagan his goldfish during his presidency.
2024	The Forge	Isaiah receives a message from his dad in which he asks to talk. Abigail and Isaiah share a friendly encounter in college.
2024	The Greatest of All Time	In the mid-credits scene, It is revealed that "Jeevan" was a clone. The real Jeevan, still known as Sanjay, has since created more clones to target Gandhi.; A collection of outtakes and bloopers is shown during the end credits.; The voice of Seenu is heard saying, "2024! This year is also ours!"
2024	Beetlejuice Beetlejuice	In a mid-credits scene, Lydia realizes that Betelgeuse will not give up on pursuing her.
2024	Transformers One	In a mid-credits scene, B-127 attempts to tell his co-workers (which he made from scrap) on sublevel 50 about his adventure, but he accidentally beheads two of them, much to his dismay.; In a post-credits scene, Megatron has rechristened the Cybertronian High Guard as the Decepticons, who vow to overthrow Optimus Prime and the Autobots and take control of Cybertron.
2024	Thangalaan	In a post-credits scene, Thangalaan single-handedly ventures deep into the mine and finally discovers an abundance of native gold, finally bringing joy to his community.
2024	The Wild Robot	In a post-credits scene, Fink and Paddler the beaver are planting a tree. As they leave, a squirrel enters and snickers, only for Fink to throw an acorn at him in annoyance.
2024	Wolfs	As the credits begin to roll, hotel camera footage of Kid and Margaret going up to her hotel room followed by Kid's accident in the hotel room is shown.
2024	Devara: Part 1	In a post-credits scene, the timid Vara tries to make his family forget about his father, who according to him abandoned them.
2024	Mission: Chapter 1	In the mid-credits scene, Guna wakes up in a hospital to learn that his daughter has successfully undergone her surgery — paid for by the British government, who honor him as a hero.
2024	The 4:30 Movie	In a mid-credits scene, Melody, Belly, and Burny try to get Brian to muster up the courage to go apply for a job at the Quick Stop convenience store. Brian looks at the store and tells the three, "It can wait."; A post-credits scene, prefaced by a title card reading: "And since you waited this long...", shows a collection of bloopers and outtakes.
2024	Turbo	In a post-credits scene, Jose, Indulekha, Rosakutty and Niranjana return to Idukki. They soon receive a parcel containing Andrew's severed head with a letter sent by Vetrivel's business partner, who wages a war against Jose for Vetrivel's death.
2024	Will & Harper	Wiig reveals to have finished the song, naming it "Harper and Will Go West", which plays over the credits along with miscellaneous footage from their trip.
2024	The Mouse Trap	In a post-credits scene, Mickey arrives at the police station, opens Rebecca's cell and tells her that there are "many people" he wants her to meet. Rebecca smiles at Mickey and leaves her cell.
2024	Don't Turn Out the Lights	During the credits, a pair of hands is seen preparing a sandwich and a glass of milk and consuming them while using a remote control to flip channels on an off-screen television that plays programs including ones speaking about the feeling of committing and giving instructions on how to stab people to death. The final channel plays a child singing the song "The People on the Bus Die One by One" heard previously in the film as the hands place the tarot card of death on the sandwich. At the end of the credits, voices of young travelers can be heard screaming, "Blue Light! Blue Light! Blue Light!" This is followed by a voice whispering, "God".
2024	Andhagan	In a post-credits scene, "The Andhagan Anthem" is sung.
2024	Apartment 7A	In a mid-credits scene, as Minnie and Roman approach the crime scene, they see Rosemary and Guy Woodhouse being interviewed by police. (Note: As depicted in Rosemary's Baby (1968).)
2024	Kadaisi Ulaga Por	In mid-credits scene, its revealed that war was not started by Human's but AI robots.
2024	Venom: The Last Dance	In a mid-credits scene, Knull exclaims that the universe is no longer safe from him.; In a post-credits scene, a bartender escapes Area 51 in a panic, while a cockroach appears to be fused with the Venom symbiote.
2024	The Platform 2	During the credits, more prisoners are shown arriving with children over time, revealing the cyclical and manipulative nature of the prison system. The final scene concludes right after the end of the previous film, and shows Perempuán reuniting with Goreng, who is revealed to be her ex-fiancé. (Note: At the end of the first film, Goreng sends a child he found on level 333 back to the top while remaining at the bottom, as Perempuán did. The last seconds of The Platform 2 show the exact next moment after the first film concluded.)
2024	Amaran	The Real Mukund's picture and the footages shot by Indu about Achamillai song were also shown in credits.
2024	The Crow	In a post-credits scene, Eric accepts his fate, content in his belief that their souls will one day find each other again.
2024	Bhool Bhulaiyaa 3	In the mid-credit scene, it is revealed that Mandira is not the real buyer. She reveals herself to Ruhaan that she is actually ACP Rathore IPS, an undercover cop, who has come to arrest Ruhaan for his frauds as the fake ghostbuster Rooh Baba. Ruhaan, upon knowing this, faints out of shock while everyone laughs.; During the credits, a song is sung.
2024	Singham Again	In the post-credits scene, ACP Chulbul Pandey visits Singham's cabin and asks to join his Shiva Squad, hinting at a sequel titled 'Mission Chulbul Singham'
2024	I, the Executioner	A post credit scene reveals that Sun-woo has escaped while being transported to the prison.
2024	Piece by Piece	We see a line of customers at the beach front shop seen earlier in the movie. N.O.R.E. comes on and says he is proud to be in the movie and finishes by saying this bakery shop is awesome.
2024	Smile 2	One of Skye's songs, Death of Me, plays during the credits, but cuts out halfway through before audio snippets of Skye screaming, which have been warped to sound like her laughing, can be heard.
2024	Saturday Night	At the end of the credits, a man can be heard shouting, "Aaah! All right, we gonna do it again. Now we got it, now we got it. Go back, go back, go back."
2024	Kanguva	In a post-credits scene, the commander of the facility, Ryan, is revealed to be the reincarnation of Rathaangasan. Fully aware of his past life, the commander decides to personally capture Zeta and Francis.
2024	Bagheera	In a post-credits scene, Chapter 8 saying "I am not done yet" is displayed, indicating a sequel.
2024	The Strangers: Chapter 1	In a post-credits scene, Maya later awakens in a hospital bed, having survived the ordeal. As she rises from the bed, Scarecrow is lying beside her.
2024	Hot Frosty	During the credits, Crime Doesn't Pay is singing and collection of bloopers and outtakes.
2024	Mathu Vadalara 2	In the post-credits scenes, Yuva confesses and takes the fall for all the events that have happened under the influence of Slave, and a mysterious figure puts Babu and Yesu to sleep, revealing himself to be Abhi.
2024	Moana 2	In a mid-credits scene, Nalo is about to punish Matangi for helping Moana with him planning revenge. They are soon visited by Tamatoa, who wants to join their cause to get revenge on Moana for her actions against him in the first film.
2024	Brother	A collection of outtakes and bloopers runs during the end credits.
2024	Thelma	A mid-credits scene shows writer/director Josh Margolin having an identical conversation with his own (now-deceased) grandmother.
2024	Elevation	In a mid-credits scene, Nina looks through a telescope with Will at her side as three greenish "meteors" enter orbit.
2024	Dear Santa	In a mid-credits scene set on Christmas Day, Mr. Byrnes is stopped on his bike by the crossing guard. Impressed by her focus on her professional duties, he asks her out on a date to the Royal Gardens for Chinese food. She agrees and they walk off together.
2024	Pushpa 2: The Rule	In a post-credits scene, as Pushpa reconciles with his estranged family at the wedding, the mysterious figure detonates a bomb. The figure could be Bhanwar Singh Shekhavat.
2024	Nutcrackers	During the credits, the family is shown opening presents on Christmas. Gretchen arrives on her motorcycle and Mike gives her a present. Mike is revealed to have bought Justice an ATV and the two ride off a ramp (based on an earlier comment about the kids wanting to do so).; In post-credits audio, the two are revealed to have failed the jump.
2024	Vettaiyan	In a mid-credits scene, Natraj is sentenced to life in prison, and Athiyan abandons his encounter-driven methods, choosing to let justice take its course.
2024	Under Paris	As the end credits suggest, Lilith and her offspring have proliferated in the major river cities of the world (Paris, London, New York, Bangkok, Venice and Tokyo), and seem to have, as Sophia feared, colonised the entire world.
2024	That Christmas	On the tablet screen, Santa Claus greets the audience a Merry Christmas while he and Dasher the Reindeer are riding a self-riding sleigh.
2024	Penelope & Everly's Holiday Adventure	In a post-credits scene, Penelope, Everly, and Justin make a new bed for Molly.
2024	Jigra	In a mid-credits scene, "Chal Kudiye" is sung and featuring Alia Bhatt and Diljit Dosanjh.
2024	The Six Triple Eight	Before the credits, Michelle Obama oversees a ceremony honoring the 6888th Central Postal Directory Battalion. On April 27, 2023, the U.S. Army renamed Fort Lee as Fort Gregg-Adams to honor Adams, making it the first U.S. military base named for a black woman. (Note: In June 2025, Fort Gregg-Adams was re-renamed to Fort Lee, for Private Fitz Lee, a Buffalo Soldier and Spanish-American War veteran who shared a name with the Confederate general Robert E. Lee.)
2024	Vicky Vidya Ka Woh Wala Video	In the post-credits scene, Vicky and Vidya keep searching for the Goa tape. Vicky's little brother eventually finds it under Vicky's bed, as it is revealed that it had slipped out during the initial burglary. As Vidya rushes to snatch it, the kid throws it away, causing it to land on a passing minitruck playing religious songs and carrying an idol of the goddess Durga, as a horrified Vicky and Vidya give chase, hinting towards a sequel.; During the credits, the songs "Chumma" and featuring Pawan Singh and "Mere Mehboob" is sung.
2024	Flow	In a post-credits scene, The Whale is seen surfacing on the ocean.
2024	The Roundup: Punishment	In a post-credits scene, Baek takes the server data stored in the villa to reestablish the ring overseas, while leaving the rest for Kwon. The police storm the villa before Kwon finishes gathering the money. Ma personally confronts Baek and a brutal fight ensues; Ma defeats Baek and arrests him. Jang gets arrested for impersonating a cop after flaunting his fake badge which Ma had given him.
2024	Sonic the Hedgehog 3	In a mid-credits scene, Sonic is confronted by an army of Metal Sonics, but is saved by the arrival of a pink hedgehog. (Note: Identified offscreen as Amy Rose.); In a post-credits scene, Shadow, who survived the explosion, reclaims his Limiter Rings.
2024	Marco	In a post-credits scene, which takes place at some point after the film, Marco spends time with Victor's son in the beach until a platoon of cars arrive and Marco notices the child is presumably missing as the screen cuts to black.
2024	Ryan's World the Movie: Titan Universe Adventure	Ryan is transported to a superlair, where he calls Combo Panda in France. He was later sucked away from a portal that appeared at the screen after Ryan hits a yellow button.
2024	A Complete Unknown	In a post-credits scene, Crowds Dancing.
2024	The Man in the White Van	A mid-credits scene shows a family on a camping trip; the daughter finds a white van parked nearby, implying that the predator is still out there.
2024	The Kingdom	In a mid-credits scene, Tarek visits Matimyas, who sits down and smiles menacingly in her prison cell.
2024	Uninvited	In a mid-credits scene, Red discovers Vega's lifeless body and gloats over it.
2024	Y2K	In a mid-credits scene, a computer voice says, "Welcome to the digital realm. Are you ready to get down?" Danny is then shown in the digital realm performing his version of "Thong Song" on a virtual beach. Afterwards, the computer voice says, "Congratulations. That was fucking tight."; After the credits are done rolling, Eli's echoing voice is heard saying "Damn".
2024	Baby John	In a post-credits scene, Satya becomes a RAW field agent and leaves with Adhira, Jackie and Agent Bhaijaan on a mission to end Boss and kills DGP Yashraj Mukerjee for helping Babbar Sher earlier.
2024	Martin	In a post-credits scene, Arjun receives a call from Martin, who is now living under a new identity as Rhino.
2024	And the Breadwinner Is...	In a mid-credits scene, Tonton decides not to sue the Salvadors and enters into a relationship with Buneng before joining them for a family photo.
2024	Witchboard	In a mid-credits scene, Brooke visits the Vatican, where a Catholic priest offers her precious diamonds in exchange for the board. Before departing with Emily, the two hand over the bone pendulum. After they leave, the priest begins to communicate with the board before Naga Soth appears behind him.
2025	Wallace & Gromit: Vengeance Most Fowl	A Montage of images.
2025	Game Changer	In the post-credits scene, The elections proceed, but Mopidevi and his allies attempt to rig the results by destroying voting machines. Ram thwarts their efforts and ensures the machines reach the counting center safely. The newly revived Abhyudhyam Party, led by Sabha and inspired by Appanna's original principles, wins by a landslide, and Ram is elected as the new Chief Minister of Andhra Pradesh.
2025	Henry Danger: The Movie	During the credits, the alternate Frankini is seen performing in the 80s-themed nightclub.
2025	One of Them Days	End credits reveal that Dreux is now a successful franchise manager, who gets picked up and dropped off from work by Maniac. Alyssa is a renowned painter, with her work selling at $1000 each. The two also live together in a newly refurbished apartment.
2025	Sky Force	In a post-credits scene, Tabby is awarded the Maha Vir Chakra and becomes the only Indian soldier to be posthumously awarded the Maha Vir Chakra.
2025	You're Cordially Invited	The various characters in the film (including Peyton Manning) are shown singing "Islands in the Stream" as the credits roll.; In a mid-credits scene, Jim proposes to Margot, who says that she doesn't want to get married. Despite this, Dixon and other Chippendales dancers come out and dance to "Chapel of Love", then strip to reveal underwear reading "SHE", "SAID", and "YES". Margot then asks if Jim wants to elope. Jim says the he thought she didn't want to get married, but she says that she just doesn't like weddings.
2025	Dog Man	A montage of picture with paper.
2025	Blazing Fists	During the credits, a press conference announcing the winner of the tournament is shown. The mothers of Ryōma and Ikuto are shown celebrating. Ryōma and Ikuto are shown walking down the street together holding bags of snacks and drinks purchased from a convenience store.
2025	Companion	Before the credits, Iris smiles and waves her robotic hand, to the other companion's confusion.
2025	Rekhachithram	In a post-credit scene, back in Kanyakumari, a young and hopeful Rekha notices a casting call for a lead actress in an upcoming Mammootty film, directed by K.G. George—her dream within reach, frozen in time.
2025	Creation of the Gods II: Demon Force	In the mid-credits scenes, Yin Jiao returns alone to Zhaoge to kill Yin Shou, but is halted by The Grandmaster of Heaven who arrives his three disciples.; In the second mid-credits scenes, Yunxiao, Qiongxiao and Bixiao; a defeated Wen Zhong meets Shen Gongbao who has come to collect his head as per the King's orders, and commands an army of Gu soldiers to march onto Xiqi.; In the post-credits scene, the Grandmaster of Heaven raises a brainwashed Yin Jiao from a pool of mercury and presents him to Yin Shou and Daji as their puppet.
2025	Nesippaya	In a post-credits scene, Arjun, who survived the gunshot and was imprisoned for the hijacking, is released and finally reunites with Diya.
2025	Night of the Zoopocalypse	Just as the credits finish, the zoo announcer says, "We hope to see you again, real soon."
2025	Heart Eyes	In a mid-credits scene, Ally gets a mysterious phone call in the same threatening tone as previous calls from Heart Eyes. It is then revealed to be her friend, who was photographing the proposal. The phone call then ominously hangs up, in the same way as earlier when the couple at the winery's photographer were murdered.
2025	Les Tuche: God Save the Tuche	In a mid-credits scene, Jeff arrives at Arsenal in a London taxi. The club groundsman, in a golf cart, tells Jeff he's found the famous imaginary key and shows it to him. Jeff tells him it's not the right key…; n a post-credits scene, The Tuche family are going on a cruise, reminiscent of the television series The Love Boat.
2025	Captain America: Brave New World	In a post-credits scene, an imprisoned Samuel Sterns warns Sam Wilson of a coming attack from other worlds. (Note: Identified off-screen as pertaining to the alternate universes of the multiverse)
2025	Kadhalikka Neramillai	in a post-credits scene, Sid, Shriya, and Parthiv embark on a new journey together, unaware of the profound connection between them.; Second a post-credits scenes, "Yennai Izhukkuthadi" is sung and featuring A. R. Rahman and Dhee.
2025	Paddington in Peru	In a mid-credits scene, Buchanan believes he will soon be released for good behavior and plans a play for "Goldilocks and the Three Bears" starring the El Dorado bears.; In a post-credits scene, Paddington and the bears visit Phoenix Buchanan, the villain of the second film, in prison.
2025	Patsers	In a post-credits scene, Adamo struggles to walk through the container port at night. An x-ray view of his chest shows his heart struggling from zona. Adamo collapses against a fence and onto the ground. A female voice shouts, "Adamo! What the fuck? Adamo!" The screen goes black, then the words "PATSERS WILL BE BACK" appear in neon lettering.
2025	Ne Zha 2	In a mid-credits scene, Wuliang heads to a secret prison to negotiate with the captive Shen Gongbao and Shen's father—the master who trains demons—while Ne Zha's older xian brothers are mystified at Wuliang's absence.
2025	Laila	In a post-credits scene, Sonu, Jenny, and Sonu's clients prove Sonu's innocence in the adulterated cooking oil case by bringing Jyoti and Nagaraj to court. Ultimately, Rustum and his parents accept Sundari.
2025	Aghathiyaa	In a post-credits scene, "Kaatrin Viral" is sung.
2025	The Monkey	In a post-credits scene, A pale black-eyed man riding a pale horse—implied to represent the Pale Horseman—passes by and acknowledges them. Hal, determined to reconnect with his son, suggests they go dancing as it is something Lois had loved, and Petey accepts.; A teaser for Osgood Perkins next film Keeper. Were many women's from different time periods start to look at the camera and begin to scream and being covered in blood, before being cut to black with a voice line saying "This place isn't right for me." as the film's title appears.
2025	Dragon	In a mid-credits scene, Initially hesitant, Dragon is smitten with Harini upon meeting her.
2025	Vidaamuyarchi	In a mid-credits scene, he is stopped by Kayal, who asks him why he had thought of saving her in spite of all that she had done against him, to which Arjun tells her that he still loves her. Kayal hugs Arjun and they reconcile happily.
2025	Last Breath	In a mid-credits scene, the audience is told that Lemons suffered no lasting mental or physical impairment as a result of the incident, and returned to work three weeks later to finish the job he started.
2025	Badass Ravi Kumar	In the post-credits scene, Carlos's brother vows revenge, but Ravi remains confident.
2025	The Day the Earth Blew Up: A Looney Tunes Movie	In a mid-credits scene, Mrs. Grecht returns for a follow-up inspection, only to be shocked upon seeing Porky Pig and Daffy Duck's new mansion.; In a post-credits scene, Porky tries to say his "That's all folks!" line, but gets interrupted by Daffy, who tells him to leave the film open for a sequel.
2025	Detective Chinatown 1900	In a mid-credits scene, He was present when Alice died and instructs police officer Lance to deliver key evidence to Qin and Gui. Weyman wants Bai's factory land for its oil.; In a post-credits scene, As Bai leaves San Francisco, he urges Qin to stay, and Qin and Gui establish themselves as the Detective Chinatown duo.
2025	L2: Empuraan	In a post-credits scene, the Shen Triad leader expresses interest in meeting Ab'ram, setting the stage for a new conflict. Seeking to uncover Stephen's past, Govardhan begins an investigation into how Stephen became Khureshi-Ab'ram, leading a trail back to Bombay in the 1980s.
2025	Alexander and the Terrible, Horrible, No Good, Very Bad Road Trip	In a post-credits scene, Claudio continues to burn incense at his botánica to rid itself of the curse.
2025	Sikandar	In a post-credits scene, "Sikandar Naache" is sung.
2025	A Minecraft Movie	In a mid-credits scene, Henry's art teacher Clemente barges into the vice principal's office in disbelief that his ex-wife Marlene has replaced him with the villager Nitwit. Nitwit reveals that he has learned to speak Human and Marlene has learned to understand Villager, and then proposes to Marlene, which she accepts.; In a post-credits scene, Steve returns to his house in the real world. Its new owner, a woman named Alex, tells him that his chest is still in the attic, which excites Steve.
2025	Freaky Tales	Tom Hanks is seen as the manager at Late Night Video. He's on the phone with a customer and warns them to rewind and return their copy of Raiders of the Lost Ark. He says he's going to charge them and then swears at them. This is followed by a music video by Danger Zone.
2025	Detective Conan: One-eyed Flashback	In the Post-credit scene, Furuya appeared before Hayashi and offered him the plea bargain: a penalty reduction from death sentence to life imprisonment in return for not disclosing the involvement of the PSB. Hayashi is enraged, but is also reminded that if he chooses to expose the PSB, his status as Maki's lover will be revealed and public perception towards Maki and Enzo will plunge. The Nagano Police discussed with each other at the hospital, where Yui noted that Conan already informed her that Kansuke is alive. Morofushi believed that Conan is being considerate towards Yui, and while Kansuke criticized Yui for overreacting for the loss of colleague, Yui replied that the reaction may be simply beyond the working relationship.
2025	Screamboat	In a post-credits scene, Pete radios for help, revealing that he is alive but trapped.
2025	Kingston	In a mid-credits scene, Things get complicated when Kingston gets to know that he is being used to smuggling drugs instead of sea cucumbers, and decides to venture out into the haunted sea by himself, only to unearth dark secrets of the past.
2025	Day of Reckoning	In a mid-credits scene, one of Big Buck's crew returns with Hayden's head to claim the reward money. John receives a postcard from Emily in Mexico congratulating him on his re-election. A new deputy arrives to replace Danny.
2025	Deva	In a post-credits scene, Deva is in a prison cell and probably regained his memory as he is in a fit of rage again when trouble happens.
2025	Sinners	In a mid-credits scene, Sammie tours as a popular blues musician in 1992. Late one night, Stack and Mary enter the bar where it's revealed Smoke was unable to kill the former and Mary escaped. Stack says Smoke made him promise to leave Sammie alone. The pair offer Sammie immortality but he refuses. Before they leave, Sammie confesses that prior to the terror of that evening, it was the best day of his life. Stack says he feels the same way, as it was the last time he saw his brother and the sun, and the only time he felt truly free.; A post-credits scene shows young Sammie singing "This Little Light of Mine".
2025	Ace	When he asks "Kannan" for his real identity, he simply smiles as the credits roll.
2025	Into the Deep	During the closing credits roll, Richard Dreyfuss gives a speech about shark conservation.
2025	Warfare	Before the ending credits roll, the actual SEALs involved are shown participating in the production of the film.
2025	Gangers	In a mid-credits scenes, Maasilamani and his men brutally torture Mudiarasan and his brothers, determined to extract information about the money.
2025	Thunderbolts*	In a mid-credits scene, Alexei Shostakov is in a grocery store admiring the fact that the New Avengers team has been put on a Wheaties box and unsuccessfully tries to get a shopper to buy a box.; In a post-credits scene, the New Avengers and Bob discuss the recent feud with Sam Wilson over the Avengers and to sue the team for trademark infringement, along with an ongoing problem in outer space, (Note: As will be depicted in Avengers: Doomsday (2026)) when they receive a distress signal from an extra-dimensional spacecraft with a large "4" emblem. (Note: Identified off-screen as the Fantastic Four's spacecraft and logo, arriving on Earth-616 from their home reality.) A title card reads, "THE NEW AVENGERS AND BOB WILL RETURN".
2025	Peg O' My Heart	Ching locks himself in a hotel room and enters Man's nightmare, revealing that Man has altered his dream, in which he actually pushed his mother from the building.
2025	HIT: The Third Case	The mid-credits scene introduces a new police officer in Chennai, ACP Veerappan IPS, discovering a body hidden in a truck at a checkpoint, hinting at HIT: The Fourth Case.
2025	Retro	In a post-credits scene, The next day, the islanders rejoice in their newfound freedom as Paari and Rukmini finally marry, fulfilling both prophecy and love.
2025	Nonnas	During the credits, scenes from the real-life Enoteca Maria are shown, noting that the restaurant has been open for 15 years and is now staffed by nonnas from all over the world.
2025	Lilo & Stitch	In a mid-credits scene, Nani, now attending the University of California, San Diego to study marine biology, visits Lilo and Stitch back on Kauai using Jumba's portal-generating gun.
2025	Devil's Double Next Level	the film's rolling title symbolizes their limited time. Kissa and Ragavan kill one cannibal, and the Captain's idea sets a room full of traps, but Arumugam and Gopal get caught and die. Kissa and Babu use a huge metal ball to kill another cannibal, and a bomb blast kills the third one. However, Babu sacrifices himself, considering his wastrel nature in the real world. With everyone's help, Kissa finally kills the last cannibal. But just as they think they've won, the four cannibals return to life.; hinting at a sequel, "DD Never Ends". A black hole appears, sucking Kissa's family and girlfriend into it. Iruthyaraj laughs, expecting Kissa to continue the cycle. However, Kissa outsmarts him by killing Ragavan, ensuring there's no hero to continue the sequel.; In a post-credits scene, Kissa tells Iruthyaraj that reviews don't define a film's quality, and finally Iruthyaraj sets Kissa free, and he returns to the real world, where his family is safe. The film ends with fake and paid reviewers entering the theater.
2025	Fear Street: Prom Queen	In a mid-credits scene, Nancy Falconer's blood forms the Witch's Mark.
2025	Karate Kid: Legends	In a mid-credits scene, Victor opens a second pizzeria location with Mia, and Mr. Han returns to China. A pizza delivery with a note and picture inside sent by Li as a thank-you gift reaches Daniel LaRusso in Los Angeles, where Johnny Lawrence scoffs at the idea of sending New York pizza to L.A.. He pitches a new business idea: a dojo-themed pizzeria called Miyagi-Dough, much to Daniel's chagrin.
2025	Thug Life	During the end credits, it is shown that Jai Royappa has successfully arrested those engaging in corruption, including Sadanand's sister, Kanika. in "Vinveli Nayaga" is sung.
2025	Predator: Killer of Killers	In a mid-credits scene, Following her capture, the Grendel King orders a hunt for the fugitives. Ursa is returned to suspended animation and stored alongside other captives, including a Tetrabrachial (Note: As depicted in Predator: Fire and Stone (2015).) and Naru, respectively an alien and 18th century Comanche hunter who both also killed a Yautja. (Note: As depicted in Prey (2022).)
2025	The Luckiest Man in America	In a mid-credits scene, a clip from the real-life Press Your Luck episode with Peter Tomarken interviewing Michael Larson following his victory is shown.
2025	Materialists	The credits depict various couples, including Lucy and John, receiving marriage licenses at the city clerk's office.
2025	How to Train Your Dragon	It features the Book of Dragons resting on the same table, as it did previously, when Hiccup was reading it.
2025	Padakkalam	During the credits, the doctor suddenly calls the boys and tells them that Renjith has gone missing from the hospital.
2025	Elio	In a mid-credits scene, Elio and Bryce use a ham radio to contact Glordon.
2025	Bride Hard	A collection of bloopers and outtakes runs during the end credits.
2025	KPop Demon Hunters	In a live-action mid-credits scene, Twice performs "Takedown" on a recording studio.
2025	Lupin the IIIrd the Movie: The Immortal Bloodline	In a post-credits scene, Lupin's friends gather at what they believe is his grave. Yet Jigen discovers his missing cigarettes returned, hinting that Lupin is still alive. Elsewhere, a man resembling Lupin is arrested, suggesting that the story of Lupin III is not over.
2025	Heads of State	In a mid-credits scene, Comer is revealed to have survived the attack in Warsaw due to a metal plate in his head, and is approached by Bisset while attempting to pick up women at a bar.
2025	Superman	In a mid-credits scene, Superman and Krypto watch the Earth from the moon.; In a post-credits scene, Superman and Mister Terrific survey the damage done to Metropolis after the rift. When Superman makes the comment that the two halves of one particular building do not line up properly, Terrific storms off angrily.
2025	Maa	During the mid-credits scene, Vanraj, wearing his hoodie, baggy pants, and boots, is seen walking through the ashy remains of the forest, seemingly absorbing whatever was left of Amshaja's powers.
2025	I Know What You Did Last Summer	In a mid-credits scene, Karla Wilson is watching the news and learn about Ray being a killer. Julie James arrive at her home to tell her that a new killer is after them and show her a pictures of them with Karla's face crossed.
2025	Raid 2	In the mid-credits scene, Rameshwar Singh alias "Tauji", tries and offers to join hands with Dada Manohar Bhai, setting the stage for Raid 3.; During the credits, "Money Money" is sung.; Yo-Yo Honey Singh, Voice-over
2025	Bridget Jones: Mad About the Boy	Images and scenes from earlier Bridget Jones films are shown during the end credits.
2025	Smurfs	In a mid-credits scene, Razamel is stuck in the unknown dimension with a tardigrade, while Gargamel tells Joel that they have to capture the Smurfs.
2025	Saiyaara	As the credits roll, Vaani resumes writing as she reflects on her and Krish's wedding with "Saiyaara (Reprise)" playing during the credits.
2025	Thalaivan Thalaivii	In a post-credits scene, Amarasigamani sees both families united and celebrating at Aagasaveeran's hotel. However, it's revealed that Aagasaveeran and Perarasi eventually get a divorce, only to reunite the next day. Chithirai and Amarasigamani's family witnesses the couple's tumultuous relationship of reuniting despite their divorce.
2025	The Fantastic Four: First Steps	In a mid-credits scene set four years later, Sue takes her eyes off Franklin to find a book that he wants her to read. She returns and sees him interacting with a man in a green cloak who is holding a metal mask. (Note: This scene was directed by Avengers: Doomsday (2026) directors Anthony and Joe Russo during production of that film. The man was identified off-screen as Victor von Doom / Doctor Doom.); In the post-credits scene, the theme song intro of The Fantastic Four Power Hour television series plays on a television. H.E.R.B.I.E. then turns the dial of the television, turning it off.
2025	Sarzameen	After the credits Meher's back story is learned as Vijay and Harman are at Meher's funeral.
2025	The Bad Guys 2	Marmalade, still in space, turns his car into a spaceship as he blasts off home, stating that his plan has apparently come together.; A clip from earlier in the movie re-plays as Snake waves bye.
2025	The Naked Gun	Shortly into the credits, it is revealed that Frank Drebin Jr. has actually been treated to a spa resort instead of an actual internal affairs investigation. It ends in a classic Police Squad! style, complete with a freeze-frame gag, which ends when Drebin punches the fourth wall into pieces. This is followed by the intro from the television series showing the beacon light on a police car as it inexplicably travels through unlikely places.; "Weird Al" Yankovic cameos as himself as he begins his show in Cane's underground bunker, only to discover that no one is there because they have all been arrested by Drebin and the Police Squad. He speaks into the microphone, asking, "Hello? Anybody here? Cane? Evil billionaires?" The screen cuts to black, and he asks, "Crab-hands guy?", referring to a group of crab-handed people mentioned earlier in the film. As the Paramount Pictures logo is shown, he shouts, "Oh, what the heck?!"
2025	Thammudu	In a mid-credits scene, Jai succeed to get a gold medal and pays the last rites to Chitra on her headstone and declares his love towards Ratna, and they happily hug each other, A New Beginning.
2025	Son of Sardaar 2	In a post-credits scene, Jassi turns up at Rabia's door. He shows her the fire message "will you marry me" (with the correct spelling). She is delighted, and even as they are about to kiss, the fire from the message spreads to a car leaking fuel, and it explodes. In the surreal last scene, we see an angry Rohit Shetty peeking his head out of his balcony, screaming who destroyed his car. Jassi looks at him and says what is he doing here. To which Shetty responds that he is filming for Golmaal 5. Sigh. And that is how; Second In a post-credits scene, "The Po Po Song" is sung and featuring Guru Randhawa.
2025	The Pickup	In a mid-credits scene, the museum curator calls the armored car company to complain about the damaged capuchin monkey, but Clark angrily insists that the capuchin monkey must have already been damaged before the transport.
2025	War 2	In the first post-credits scene, Kabir assures Kaul he will always serve his country and rekindles his relationship with Kavya.; In the second post-credits scene, an unidentified man (Note: identified off-screen as Fateh Singh Lakhawat) tattoos the Greek letter α on a young girl's arm, inducting her into a covert government program called Alpha.
2025	Freakier Friday	A collection of outtakes and bloopers runs during the end credits.
2025	Strange Harvest	In a post-credits scene, Kirby is seen via footage recorded on his cell phone, searching for the cave where Sykes claimed to have had his supernatural experience.
2025	Oho Enthan Baby	In a post-credits scene, With Ashwin and Meera reunited, Vishnu Vishal agrees to proceed with the film based on their love story. The filming commences successfully, and Ashwin's parents, who have put aside their differences, visit the set to witness the filming.; as the credits roll, a collection for behind the scenes and during the credits
2025	The Ugly Stepsister	In a post-credits scene, it is revealed that Otto's rotting corpse remains in his house.
2025	Lokah Chapter 1: Chandra	In a mid-credits scene, an unidentified man eliminates the remnants of the trafficking ring, eventually revealing himself as Charlie, a superpowered ninja.; In a post-credits scene, an unidentified man (Vijay Menon) questions Chathan about an archaeological expedition into one of India's deepest caves, by a team of archaeologists, scientists and a monk, from which only the monk returned, having refused to go past a point of the cave. The only image captured on a recovered camera from the cave, resembled Chathan himself. When asked if the being was truly him, Chathan responds that it could instead be one of his 389 siblings.
2025	Omniscient Reader: The Prophecy	In a mid-credits scene, Han Myeong-oh, the former superior of Dok-ja, arrives, revealing that Geumho has been destroyed and all survivors except him are dead. As the group prepares for the next scenario, a mysterious train sound echoes in the distance.
2025	F1	During the credits, Sonny Hayes lines up for the Baja 1000. When asked what he is racing for, Sonny laughs.
2025	Hari Hara Veera Mallu	In a post-credits scene, the battle concludes with Veera Mallu hanging on tightly to Aurangzeb as they are caught in the storm hinting at a violent confrontation.
2025	Detective Ujjwalan	A mid-credits scene shows the mysterious teacher reading the news of twin brothers arrested for Plachikkavu serial murders and smiles. Also, a local kid rushes to Ujjwalan, who makes his library into a new detective consultancy.
2025	Colorful Stage! The Movie: A Miku Who Can't Sing	Unshuttered SEKAI (Note: Identified through a cross-promotion with the game of the same name.) Miku looks on happily as she finally gets her own visitors to her SEKAI.; As normal for Miku concerts, an aftershow (encore) plays as Miku and the other Vocaloids sing Deco*27's Hello, SEKAI, the movie's theme song. Contrary to the rest of the movie, this aftershow is in the artstyle of the Miku concerts.
2025	Caught Stealing	In a mid-credits scene, Hank's mother receives $2,000,000 in a box mailed from him.; In a second mid-credits scene, Bud the cat is shown on the beach.
2025	The Toxic Avenger	In a mid-credits scene, Bob's crimes are exposed, saving Wade, J.J., and Fritz, though Fritz is arrested. The townspeople celebrate Winston, and he embraces Wade, affirming their bond as father and son.; In a post-credits scene, Kissy is revealed to be alive but horribly burned, while Winston teaches the audience how to make the best grilled cheese sandwich.
2025	Bhairavam	In the end credits, Venkateshwara Rao is brutally killed by Seenu, who is portrayed as the saviour of Dharma. With no other choice, Seenu is released and reunites with Vennela.
2025	The Conjuring: Last Rites	During the end credits, various pieces actual footage of the Warrens are shown, interspersed with special effects of entities.; A post-credits image shows Ed Warren looking into the conjuring mirror from the story in the film as the on-screen text describes the conjuring mirror and states that it is currently located at the Warren's Occult Museum.
2025	Kingdom	In a post-credits scene, Sethu, Odiyappan's elder son and Murugan's elder brother, arrives in Divi to avenge his kin, while Singha finally reaches Suri and Suguna's house in Ankapur and finds a photo of Suri in his police uniform, hinting at a sequel.
2025	The Shadow's Edge	A third twin brother of Xi Wang and Xi Meng is revealed and he places a bounty on Wong, He, and Fu.
2025	Xeno	In a mid-credits scene, the alien's corpse is studied by CIA forensics until it unexpectedly revives.
2025	Downton Abbey: The Grand Finale	A mid-credits scene shows the couples in the series enjoying each other's company.
2025	Coolie	In a post-credits scene, Preethi and her sisters depart abroad, forgiving Deva without knowing he is her father, calling him "uncle" in her farewell.
2025	Spinal Tap II: The End Continues	As with the first film, interviews with the band members are shown during the end credits.
2025	The Wrong Paris	A slideshow showing Dawn Blanton and Trey McAllen are spending their dates together followed by a series of outtakes.
2025	Gabby's Dollhouse: The Movie	During the first half of the credits, Vera, Chumsley, the Kitty Rangers and the kitty gnomes have a dance party while one of the kitty gnomes finishes counting only to find out no one is there.
2025	They Call Him OG	In the first post-credits scene, involving traditional swordsmanship and modern warfare, Ojas engages Omi Bhau in a final duel. Ojas emerges victorious, ending Omi's reign of terror.; In the second post-credits scene, The implication is that his vengeance is complete, but so is he, a relic who has successfully eliminated his enemies while proving Malini's point about his own obsolescence.
2025	One Battle After Another	In a post-credits scene, For Adam.
2025	Tron: Ares	In a mid-credits scene, Julian explores the damaged Dillinger Grid and is transformed by an identity disc that belonged to his grandfather's program, Sark.
2025	The Threesome	In a post credits scene, Connor's best man Greg decides to tell the story of Connor, Olivia, and Jenny during his toast at Connor and Olivia's wedding.
2025	Chainsaw Man – The Movie: Reze Arc	In a post-credit scene, Denji is shown waiting for Reze in the café with a bouquet of flowers, but Power shows up instead, triumphantly proclaiming that she has found him. Power mistakes the bouquet meant for Reze as a gift for her return causing her to blush at his mistaken gesture before asking him to give the bouquet to her. Denji considers giving Power the bouquet while exchanging glances with her until he decides to eat the bouquet much to her chagrin causing her to try and take the bouquet from him.
2025	Dude	In a post-credits scene, Agan reconciles with his mother after the divorce incident knowing the truth, and she says she finds out that Agan and the colleague whom he previously used to prank Kural mutually loved each other and their marriage is fixed. It is also shown that Athiyamaan has confessed about his wife's murder and got imprisoned.
2025	Roofman	During the credits, photographs of the real Jeffrey Manchester are shown, along with footage from local news reports in 2004 related to the case, and interviews with the real Leigh as well as others who interacted with Manchester.
2025	Thamma	In a post-credits scene, Alok is informed that he would need extra powers to fight him and the blood of a werewolf can only do that. He vanishes into thin air to search for Bhediya. Tadaka dances in the credits scene.
2025	The Twits	In a mid-credits scene, the Twits stand on their hands to correct themselves, but are stuck to the floor due to the glue the orphans applied to their heads. The orphans party in victory and mock the Twits' fate, saying they will shrink to death due to gravity. Beesha realizes they can no longer understand the Muggle-Wumps anymore, so they fix their revenge and free the Twits.
2025	Good Boy	The end credits that follow show various scenes of Indy sticking his head out Vera's car window while they drive through the woods. At the end, a whistle similar to Todd's is heard, prompting Indy to get back inside the car.
2025	Desingu Raja 2	In a post-credits scene, "Pidaa Kovil Thoppu" is sung.
2025	The Elixir	In a mid-credits scene, Sadimin's business partners in Jakarta—Santoso and Grace—unsuccessfully try to contact Sadimin and his family. Grace ingests a vial of Abadi Nan Jaya and finds herself becoming younger before showing it to Santoso.
2025	Springsteen: Deliver Me from Nowhere	In a mid-credits scene, Nebraska reached number three on the charts. Bruce Springsteen's following album, Born in the U.S.A., launched him to global superstardom, as he continued to seek treatment for depression.
2025	Quezon	A radio set plays "Mambo Magsaysay" in the mid-credits scene.
2025	Mass Jathara	In the post-credits scene, Starting from the district SP, how could an ordinary railway SI stop Sivudu, who has the support of the entire political establishment? How did he overthrow his marijuana empire? makes the rest of the story.
2025	Regretting You	In a mid-credits scene, Clara and Miller have finished moving the city limits sign past his grandfather's house, and Miller calls to order a pizza delivery.
2025	Detective Conan: One-eyed Flashback	Furuya appeared before Hayashi and offered him the plea bargain: a penalty reduction from death sentence to life imprisonment in return for not disclosing the involvement of the PSB. Hayashi is enraged, but is also reminded that if he chooses to expose the PSB, his status as Maki's lover will be revealed and public perception towards Maki and Enzo will plunge. The Nagano Police discussed with each other at the hospital, where Yui noted that Conan already informed her that Kansuke is alive. Morofushi believed that Conan is being considerate towards Yui, and while Kansuke criticized Yui for overreacting for the loss of colleague, Yui replied that the reaction may be simply beyond the working relationship.
2025	Afterburn	August visits a vault and hangs the stop plug on the real Mona Lisa.
2025	De De Pyaar De 2	In a post-credits scene, Raunak Molta, Rakesh, Anju, Ashish, Kittu, Rohan, Aditya, Tia and Ayesha.; Second, in a post-credits scene, "Jhoom Sharabi" is sung and featuring Yo Yo Honey Singh.; Yo-Yo Honey Singh, voice-over.
2025	A Very Jonas Christmas Movie	During the credits, "Coming Home This Christmas" is sung.; Second During the credits, a video of Ethan apologizing to Nick is shown.
2025	A Loud House Christmas Movie: Naughty or Nice	During the credits in the style of Christmas card drawings, the Loud family celebrates Christmas with Albert and Myrtle and go sledding where they see Santa Claus; Lori delivers her Bobby ice sculpture to Bobby with the Casagrandes present; Lucy finally gets an autograph from Krampus; Gerald delivers towels to Santa's reindeer in their gym; and Duncan oversees T.I.N.N.S.L.'s upgrades.
2025	Playdate	A series of bloopers and outtakes runs at the start of the credits.; In a mid-credits scene teasing a sequel, Jeff and CJ arrive at Brian's home at 2 a.m. for a sleepover, revealing their house was burned down by a new group of pursuers, not Maddox.
2025	In Your Dreams	In the mid-credits after the Tings drive off following the moving truck incident, Joon on his hoverboard finds The Legend of the Sandman book on the street while en route to his Polly's Pizzeria gig and throws it into a nearby garbage can before riding off.
2025	Zootopia 2	At the beginning of the credits, the Zootopians attend the Burning Mammal festival and watch Gazelle perform "Zoo".; In a post-credits scene, Judy repeatedly replays a recording on her carrot pen of Nick saying he loves her, only to once again be bothered by Bucky and Pronk, who argue over whether or not she should stop playing the recording. When she sarcastically tells the two that her next case involves a rabbit who strangles her neighbors, causing the two to argue over who offended her. Unbeknownst to Judy, something flies past her window and leaves a feather behind.
2025	Jingle Bell Heist	During the credits, Sophie, Sophie's mother, Sophie's friend from the bar, Nick, Nick's daughter, and Nick's roommate all gather for a Christmas dinner.
2025	Troll 2	In a mid-credits scene, Møller is secretly studying a baby troll that has been grown from one of Jotun's genetic samples.
2025	Dhurandhar	In a post-credits scene, Hamza consolidates power in Lyari and prepares to target "Bade Sahab", the architect of multiple Pakistani terror attacks.
2025	Influencers	A completely unhinged CW chases and butchers Jacob's best friend and his groupies while laughing maniacally, as the credits roll.
2025	Kantara: Chapter 1	In a mid-credits scene, The narrator from 1970 reflects on the legend, and the well is revealed as the same circle where Berme, Annappa, and later Kaadubettu Shiva himself vanished. (Note: As depicted in Kantara (2022)) When asked by Shiva what the well holds, the narrator affirms that it is a legend for another day, confirming Kantara: Chapter 2.
2025	Christmas Karma	In a mid-credits scene, people including Priyanka Chopra are shown singing "Last Christmas".
2025	Oh. What. Fun.	During the end credits, the Wang-Wasserman family is shown singing "I Heard the Bells on Christmas Day".
2025	Anaconda	In a mid-credits scene, Santiago is revealed to be alive.
2025	Merv	In a mid-credits scene, they run into each other in the park and confess their love for each other and reconcile.
2025	Falcon Express	In a mid-credits scene, Falcon's three rat uncles are excited to see him arrive home, once more.
2025	Bha Bha Ba	In a post-credits scene, The Commoner, revealed to be Ram Damodar "Radar," is readmitted to the mental hospital. While there, goons sent by the Oscar Brothers attempt to kill him, but Bala intervenes to save him. Oscar vows revenge against Bala and Radar in "Azhinjattam" is sung.
2025	Song Sung Blue	In a mid-credits scene, Claire's son, Dayna, plays a recording of Mike singing "Song Sung Blue", while Claire plants more flowers in the garden at the site where she was struck by the car.
2025	Dongji Rescue	During the credits, the text revealed what happened after the survivors of the Lisbon Maru arrived on shore where the Japanese decided not to shoot the island villagers due to the potential international outcry if they had did so.
2025	Dust Bunny	In a mid-credits scene, As they drive on a sunny highway, the monster is seen running alongside the car.
2025	Whistle	In a mid-credits sequence, Asha is called to the stage at a school assembly in the auditorium to play the school anthem on her violin to kick off the spring semester, but instead pulls out the whistle. Chrys and Ellie scream for her to stop, but she blows the whistle anyway, dooming everyone in the auditorium.
2025	Death Whisperer 3	In a mid-credits scene, Yakhin and Kongmu, who warned them that no charm or incantation from the outside world could protect them there. It was only the silver bells that could serve as signs of looming danger.
2025	The Testament of Ann Lee	The credits mention the population of various Shaker communities, and that there are only two Shakers left in 2025.
2025	Another World	Midway through the credits, Yuri and Dark Sky look over Gudo's new life from Another World.
2025	Dead Man's Wire	At the end of the credits, Grable's voice can be heard saying, "What a shitshow."
2025	Primate	After the credits roll, a crab toy can be heard singing the "Crab Song".
2025	Under Fire	In a mid-credits scene, behind-the-scenes footage of a deleted scene involving Abbott stabbing the female drug runner in the neck is shown.
2025	Saipan	Before the credits, it is shown that Ireland reached the last 16 of the World Cup before losing on penalties to Spain. Back in Manchester, Keane plays football alone in his garden, reminiscing on the times he played football as a child in 1980.
2025	John Candy: I Like Me	During the credits, additional footage is shown of the Bill Murray interview from the documentary, scenes from Uncle Buck, scenes from SCTV, the "orange whip" scene in The Blues Brothers, Chevy Chase speaking about John Candy during an awards show, deleted scenes from Planes, Trains and Automobiles, footage from a commercial for the Lincoln shop-at-home service selling the carpeting referenced in the documentary, Tommy Lister Jr. talking about Candy, Maureen O'Hara praising Candy's acting as the both appear on The Tonight Show with Johnny Carson, a deleted scene from Home Alone, and references to Del Griffith's famous "I like me" speech made in Family Guy, in Deadpool 2, and in Wolverine and Deadpool, then the actual audio of Del Griffith's speech is played over home video footage of John Candy.; After the credits, footage from a deleted scene in Planes, Trains and Automobiles is shown in which Del Griffith finally opens his trunk and shows Neal Page its contents.
2025	I Swear	During the credits, with footage of the real John Davidson, the subject of several BBC documentaries, starting with John's Not Mad, along with a postscript emphasising the importance of societal awareness in the management of Tourette's.
2026	People We Meet on Vacation	Before the credits, Alex moves to New York City to build a life with Poppy, and they resume their vacations together.
2026	The RajaSaab	In a post-credits scene, joker-like figure resembling RajaSaab is seen lurking in the shadows, leaving the ultimate fate of the bloodline in question.
2026	Cosmic Princess Kaguya!	Somewhere in Tsukoyomi, A blimp-like aircraft past the island-like atmosphere while Iroha and Yachiyo can be heard in the background dreaming about pancakes but Iroha is just an extra.
2026	Border 2	In a post-credits scene, Belongings are collected, letters are sent home, and the young lieutenant, now matured by experience, salutes those who did not survive. Colonel Fateh reflects on the sacrifices endured before rejoining his men.; The film concludes with a tribute to the courage, unity, and selflessness of soldiers who fight not for personal glory but for their comrades and the defense of their homeland.
2026	Send Help	Before the credits, in which she claims to be the only survivor of the plane crash. Linda drives away with her cockatiel, singing along to Blondie's "One Way or Another".
2026	Iron Lung	A montage from photos and images end credits.
2026	The Muppet Show	In the closing moments, Kermit thanks Sabrina Carpenter, who jokes that they fit in together because they are the same height. Gonzo continues skating past while shouting Oscar winners, Seth Rogen grumbles from the audience about being cut, and Statler and Waldorf deliver their final heckles as the curtain falls and the credits roll.
2026	Prakambanam	During a post credits scene, Madhavan is on a beach in Goa, but then he sees Stanislavski, possessed by Rukmini.
2026	Return to Silent Hill	extra images during the credits, highlighting key, symbolic items from the movie—such as the radio, a letter, and various monsters—before concluding with an image of the protagonist, James Sunderland, looking into a mirror.
2026	Goat	Will's mom can be heard whispering "Dream Big!
2026	O'Romeo	In a mid-credits scene, Afshan taking children's music classes with Ustara and the gang sitting and learning from behind as well.
2026	Solo Mio	Mid-credits scenes show Matt and Gia, after an indeterminate amount of time, marrying in Italy with both married couples who helped Matt in attendance, both with new milestones of their own to celebrate during the ceremony.
2026	Scream 7	During the credits, Mindy with the blessing from Gale gets to report the days event for local TV.
2026	Hoppers	In a mid-credits scene, Loaf, Ellen, and Tom play with the Jerry Hopper's silicon mask, only for a bird to swoop down and steal it away, much to their disappointment.; In a post-credits scene, Mabel follows through on getting the elderly man's grocery list by having the ants deliver them to him. The elderly man is calmly amused by this.
2026	The Bride!	During the credits, Lupino is apprehended by Wiles and the female rioters who were inspired by the Bride's rants.
2026	Ustaad Bhagat Singh	During the credits, Bhagat goes to Nagappa's house and tells him that his mission is over and decide his fate. Shocked at Bhagat's win, Nagappa commits suicide. Chandrasekhar Rao gets cured and he and Bhagat reunite.
2026	Dhurandhar: The Revenge	In the mid-credits scene, flashbacks from Jaskirat's training with the Research & Analysis Wing are depicted.; In the post-credits scene, Shamshad orders Omar into a mental asylum, after he threatens to reveal Shamshad's release of Hamza to the National Assembly.
2026	I Can Only Imagine 2	In a mid-credits scene, Scott asks his dad if he ever wants to talk about his feelings. His dad says not really, and Scott agrees. Then the dad thanks Scott for a copy of his book. Both men resume looking out at the pasture.
2026	The Pout-Pout Fish	In a mid-credits scene, A lobster goes to get his package, he ordered, and when he comes back, he feels shocked to see the starfish in his home.
2026	Mike & Nick & Nick & Alice	A collection from bloopers and outtakes during the credits.
2026	Forbidden Fruits	A mid-credits scene reveals that Sharon is an undercover police detective who has been investigating Apple. Noticing the doll, still recording, at the crime scene, she collects it to use as evidence
2026	Kadhal Reset Repeat	During the credits, Aditi voicing.
2026	Dolly	The metal screen door opens and Officer Lee along with another officer and a convict are standing there. Lee says "We got him. Wilkerson, Toby." The convict says "I told him" (and other stuff as Lee talks over him). Lee "so we had to come out here right away and they only found a little bit of him. Get this. They also found a woman out there. That woman was wearing a doll mask." Other officer says "Shut up, let him talk" to the convict and then to audience "Doll mask, sir". Convict says "like on a doll" and motions over his face. They stand quiet and scene ends.
2026	The Super Mario Galaxy Movie	In the mid-credits scene, Fox McCloud sends the Bowsers to prison before heading home.; In the post-credits scene, Ukiki attempts another robbery but is stopped by Princess Daisy.
2026	The Magic Faraway Tree	In a mid-credits scene, As the whole village celebrates, Tim and Moonface briefly reunite.; At the very end of the credits, the face from the talking fridge (at the beginning of the film) appears asking if anyone wants wine.
2026	Love Insurance Kompany	In a post-credits scene, the story delivers the message that even in a highly advanced future, genuine human connection cannot be engineered by technology. Love remains unpredictable, emotional, and deeply human, and that is what makes it meaningful.
2026	Hunting Matthew Nichols	In a mid-credits sequence, a disfigured Markian is visited in the hospital by Ryan. When Ryan approaches him, Markian begins screaming and violently convulsing.
2026	You, Me & Tuscany	A collection of outtakes and bloopers runs during the end credits.
2026	Aadu 3	In the mid-credit scenes we see Shaji Pappan fighting Sulthan Azam Khan's soldiers.
2026	Cold War 1994	set in 2017, Yip interrupts Kan and Lau to reveal that Choi was assassinated earlier that day in London, and they suspect the records in M.B.'s classified file were deliberately altered.
2026	Youngblood	Dean Youngblood is seen dressing up and getting out on the ice before his debut game with the L.A. Kings. As he lines up for the opening face-off he hears "Welcome to the show, rook!" He looks up at the opposing center and it's his former captain with the Mustangs – Denis.
2026	That Time I Got Reincarnated as a Slime the Movie: Tears of the Azure Sea	In the post credit scene, an egg washes to shore and a baby water dragon hatches from it. Meanwhile, Diablo has defeated the primordial Jaune and learns that he works for Rimuru. Jaune takes an interest in Rimuru.
2026	Karuppu	In a mid-credits scene, the opposition party in the Tamil Nadu Legislative Assembly criticises Chief Minister Usilampatti Karuppiah Gandhi (UKG) for failing to address the demands of the judiciary. During the vote of trust, UKG proves he has the support of the majority. He is opposed only by Karuppu, who is now seen in the opposition party as an MLA.
2026	Mother Mary	During the credits, Mother Mary performs a song and dance with her dancers.; After a pause, shots of Mother Mary falling with the red cloth are shown.; At the end of the credits, shots of Sam's workshop and supplies are shown.
2026	Finding Emily	In a mid-credits scene, "Rock and a Calm Place" is sung.
2026	Over Your Dead Body	After the end credits roll, a photo is shown of the cast and crew, with many giving the camera the middle finger, one giving the devil horns, and one giving a thumbs-up gesture.
2026	Kattalan	A mid-credits scene addresses the immediate narrative continuity of Marco (2024). It unravels the underlying mystery behind the kidnapping of Marco's nephew, establishing the exact timeline bridge and narrative connection that links the events of Kattalan directly to the plot of Marco.; A second mid-credits scene features a surprise crossover cameo by Tamil film director Lokesh Kanagaraj, making an acting appearance as Leo Cabral. Operating in the shadows of the neon-drenched criminal underworld, Cabral is introduced as a gritty and enigmatic figure seeking to seize control of the power vacuum left behind by the collapsed Aanakolli ivory cartel.; A post-credits scene leaves the narrative open-ended. It reveals that Antony's structural disruption of the forest's illicit ivory trade has triggered a massive domino effect. His actions position him as a direct target for the deep-rooted forces of the D'Peter crime family, laying the foundation for an impending, larger-scale war over territory in Marco 2.
2026	Masters of the Universe	In the first mid-credit scene, Orko pops up to explain the message of the movie to the audiences.; In the second mid-credit scene, Queen Marlena and Man-At-Arms are discussing a mystery person, with Man-At-Arms telling the Queen that maybe, this person will come back one day like Adam did. It then cut to She-Ra, seen from the back, holding the Sword of Protection. Someone arrive and refer to her as the Force Captain Adora, to which she replies "No, not anymore".; In the post-credit scene, Evil-Lyn return to Castle Grayskull where she find Skeletor's disembodied head on the floor, she picks it up, and it cut to black, and the cackle of Skeletor can be heard.
2026	The Breadwinner	During the end credits, clips from Nate Bargatze's stand-up routines relating to plot points in the film are shown along with outtakes and behind-the-scenes footage from the film.
2026	Scary Movie	A mid-credits scene shows a trailer for the fake film Brosferatu parodying the 2024 film Nosferatu.; A second mid-credits scene shows the FBI discussing and then interrogating Shorthand as a potential Ghostface suspect in a parody of the 2024 film Longlegs.
2026	Peddi	During the credits, Although the government offers to name the station after him, Peddi requests that the village be renamed "Appalavalasa" in honor of Appalasoori. He returns home to a celebratory welcome, reconciling with his mother and Achiyamma.; In a post-credits scene, In the present day, the inspired government official resolves to implement a national initiative to identify and nurture grassroots sports talent in remote villages across India.
2026	Office Romance	George's HR office fills with employees declaring workplace relationships, secret hookups, and romantic interest after AirCruz changes its office dating policy.; Jackie and Daniel are engaged and invite George to their London destination wedding, while the office's new relationship-disclosure policy creates an HR nightmare.; A plane flies over the sea with "Just Married" on the wings and cans hanging from the back, confirming Jackie and Daniel's wedding happy ending.
2026	Hokum	Lingering supernatural dread, haunted-hotel atmosphere, unresolved unease, and one final sonic scare
2026	Drishyam 3	In the mid-credits scene, as Georgekutty's surrender is broadcast publicly, Prabhakar confronts Geetha, who remains emotionally devastated and expresses that she still does not feel closure, indicating ongoing psychological trauma within the family. Although hearing that Georgekutty surrendered, Geetha is not fully satisfied and wants Anju to be next, making Prabhakar in turmoil.
2026	Toy Story 5	In a mid-credits scene, the Hi-Tech Buzz Lightyear toys land in a school playground for the children (and one of the teachers) to have, until a boy brings out his Hi-Tech Zurg toy.; In a post-credits scene, Pizza with Sunglasses and Lilypad do an impromptu rap song using sound effects from the other toys.
2026	Cocktail 2	In an early mid-credits scene, Ally teases Kunal that she has no problem marrying divorced men and that if their marriage does not work out, he need not worry. The three share a light-hearted banter before Ally leaves the newlyweds to their wedding night.
2026	The Sheep Detectives	"I still think it's the maid."
2026	I Love Boosters	In a post-credits scene, a spiral may pass through familiar positions while still moving somewhere new. In that sense, Violeta's description can be read as a final reflection on the film's revolutionary themes: history may repeat familiar struggles, but organized people can still push events forward rather than remaining trapped in the same circle.
2026	Con City	During the credits, Satha drives away in a separate car, parodying the emotional ending of Fast and Furious 7, as the vehicles part ways on different roads.
2026	Tuner	The brief audio cue recalls the dog's presence during Niki's involvement with Uri, Benny and Yoni. Earlier in the story, Benny shows concern that a loud air horn could frighten or upset the animal.
2026	Girls Like Girls	Coley returns home from the pool party when Sonya runs after her. They passionately embrace and kiss in the street. Sonya makes Coley promise to message her, reminding her that she knows where she lives and will track her down. Coley smiles and tells Sonya she is counting on it.
2026	Minions & Monsters	the spell book falls into the hands of Gru's Minions and is tested by James, Henry, Kevin, Stuart and Bob, as well as one of Gru's adoptive daughters, Agnes.
2026	Little Brother	Rudd and Marcus are making a real estate commercial plus outtakes and a new intro for a new episode of NYC Hustlers featuring the brothers.
2026	Evil Dead Burn	The still-possessed Polly is revealed to have escaped the house and is found by a motorist crawling away. Polly scratches the motorist's leg, passing on the Deadite possession.; The manager of the crematoriums's daughter finds Ellie Bixler's unclaimed ashes before Deadite Ellie appears and kills her.
2026	Leader	In a post-credits scene, bringing closure to his long ordeal, with the ending possibly hinting a sequel.
2026	Speed Demon	In a mid-credits scene, Vatican officials investigate evidence suggesting that the demonic outbreak was part of a larger supernatural conspiracy, hinting at future confrontations between the Church and forces of evil.
2026	Dhamaal 4	In a post-credits scene, Adhoora turns his ship into a tourist place because Guddu saved his life. Amaira and Aarav also finally warm up to Guddu as the stepfather in Dhamaal 5.; During the credits, are songs "Chatni" and "Qeher" is sung and featuring Neelkamal Singh, Guru Randhawa and Ketika Sharma.
2026	72 Hours	A collection of outtakes and bloopers runs during the end credits.
2026	Outcome	During the credits, Xander ends up going on The Drew Barrymore Show instead of Reef Hawk. Earlier, Reef was supposed to appear on Barrymore's show as part of his public image-repair strategy, but he walks away from the live interview moments before it begins. FandomWire's ending breakdown describes Reef leaving Drew Barrymore's interview just seconds before going live, while IndieWire notes that the credits include Matt Bomer improvising with Barrymore.
2026	Jana Nayagan	the emotional end-credit sequence of Thalapathy Vijay's final film
2026	Spider-Man: Brand New Day	The Spidey Tracker app made by Ned Leeds is seen, and it detects a new Spider-Man sighting with an unknown location. The app begins to glitch as the map zooms away from Earth.
2026	Ice Cream Man	A post-credits scene shows the corpse of the decapitated man on the two-wheel scooter riding out of town.
2026	One Night Only	As the credits end, there is a faint groan.
2026	Jackass: Best and Last	The entire credits is accompanied by video clips with the guys celebrating the end of filming, outtakes, and behind-the-scenes clips from the Jackass television and film series.; After a few seconds of black screen, there is a video clip of a hand stretching and releasing a springy doorstop several times.
2026	Super Troopers 3	In a mid-credits scene, Captain O'Hagan, who has been retired and been visiting the troopers during the course of the movie, is in a tub with his girlfriend, former Governor Jessman, and tells her that the reason he visits the old station is to find $4 million he hid many years ago. A title card appears that reads, "Super Troopers 4: The Search for O'Hagan's Gold".; During the end credits, a gag reel of alternate takes and behind-the-scenes footage runs.
2026	Gail Daughtry and the Celebrity Sex Pass	The roofer who is defamed in the final scene of the film appears on camera to defend himself. Gail then calls to ask for work on her roof, which she can see from the hot air balloon.
2026	Pressure	The film's closing credits reveal that the success of Operation Overlord enabled the Allies to defeat Germany within a year. Dwight D. Eisenhower, in a 1961 conversation with JFK, credits Overlord's success to the fact that the Allies "had better meteorologists than the Germans".
2026	Camp Rock 3	During the credits, "Play My Music" is sung.
2026	Insidious: Out of the Further	Cyrus is strapped to the dental chair in the Further, and then tortured with a drill by the same dentist who appeared when Gemma initially met Cyrus.
2026	Hope	A mid-credits scene shows that Sung-ki has survived, limping down the highway.
2026	Alpha	In a mid-credits scene, "Massacre" is sung.
2026	Buddy	After the end credits, voices of children saying the catchfrase "It's Buddy" is heard.
2026	Mayday	The mid-credits sequence finally reveals the genuinely embarrassing or completely underwhelming real story behind the call sign, resolving the running gag rather than setting up a sequel or teasing a new threat.
2026	Blast	In a post-credits scene, while in Ilango's shop, Nila watches a news story about the mysterious death of Varun, Kirubakaran, and others.
2026	Shaun the Sheep: The Beast of Mossy Bottom	In a short mid-credit scene, a crow drinks the remnants of the growth potion out of a bin.
2026	Gatta Kusthi 2	A post-credits scene reveals that the student whom the coach had plotted with to spike Keerthi's food and drinks with steroids had revealed the truth to Keerthi shortly after she gave birth, which led to Keerthi understanding the truth and forgiving Veera.
2026	Avengers: Endgame Encore	In a mid-credits scene, Banner, following the events of Spider-Man: Brand New Day, has sealed himself away in a bunker to create a gamma suppression serum when he is suddenly visited by a mysterious figure who has come to "collect" him. Banner suddenly disappears, leaving behind a glowing green sigil in the ground.; Another mid-credits scene, attached to some screenings, has the Time Variance Authority witnessing two separate earths firing cannons at each other. As they see the number of earths being annihilated growing, Ouroboros announces that the multiverse is collapsing.; In a post-credits scene, Doctor Doom forges his mask.
2026	Other Mommy	After the end credits, Other Mommy appears again, looking down towards the camera. The entity raises a finger to its lips, whispers and silence, "Shhhhhhhh."
2026	Street Fighter	Anime scene of Sagat training on Thailand Beach. He knocks down a palm tree. Then Bison floats in from above along with Vega and Cammy. Zoomed in of Sagat’s face as he grunts.
2026	Jailer 2	In a post-credits scene, Muthuvel surrenders to the police for Arjun's murder. As he enters a police car, a policeman unexpectedly hands him a phone with Kantha calling, revealing that she survived Muthuvel's attack.
2026	Nayyi Navelli	In the post-credits scene, kaalasheel was obtained by Mohini again.
2026	Wildwood	Behind the scenes footage of the final frame of the film being made is shown.
2026	Ali G: Who Iz I?	There are many extras shown, a MeJulie labor scene, Ali meets ASAP Rocky and Rihanna, and we here Ali’s rap song.
2026	Christmas at the Kringles	The tape of Noel repeating “Joy” plays, followed by bloopers and outtakes.
2026	Haiwaan	In a post credit scene Nandini along with Shyam is about to cross the road when another blind man named Jayaraman interacts with them and is seen crossing road with help of Nandini.
2026	Godzilla Minus Zero	We hear Godzilla’s footsteps and his roar.
2026	The Cat in the Hat	In a mid-credits scene, it is Pig in a Wig's birthday and he is gifted with a box of some Things by Cat in the Hat. The box bursts open and the room is flooded with Things and a large party ensues in the office.; After the credits roll, the Go-Backer appears on screen. It activates and the movie rewinds to the start and the Warner Bros. Pictures Animation logo. The logo flips open and the silhouette of Cat in the Hat appears and exclaims "Let's do it again!" As he starts to count into a song Sherrie from HR appears and tells him the movie is over and the logo slams shut.
2026	Ramayana: Part 1	Hanuman emerges and chants Rama's name.
2026	Meesaya Murukku 2	In a post-credits scene, We Miss You Vivek sir.
2026	i Play Rocky	Recreations of memorable scenes from the final fight in the original Rocky movie are shown. This is followed by clips from the 1977 Oscars where Rocky won for best picture and Irwin Winkler and Robert Chartoff brought up Sylvester Stallone to stand with them during their acceptance speech.; We see a clip from Stallone’s first interview on the Tonight Show. The scene starts with Johnny Carson talking about the creation of the movie Rocky while introducing Sylvester Stallone. During the intro Johnny says that “if they made a movie about how this movie came about you wouldn’t believe it.” Stallone comes on and talks about the making of the movie.

== See also ==
- Mid-credits and post-credits scenes in the Marvel Cinematic Universe
