= List of films with post-credits scenes (2010s) =

Many films have featured mid- and post-credits scenes. Such scenes often include comedic gags, plot revelations, outtakes, or hints about sequels.

== 2010s ==
Year	Title	Description of scene(s)
2010	Tooth Fairy	The end scene continues into the credits where Jerry and Lily attend Derek's hockey game.
2010	Valentine's Day	A collection of bloopers and outtakes during the end credits.; A visual of cheerleaders forming a heart shape on a football field.
2010	When in Rome	During the credits, "Dance in the End" is sung.
2010	Scooby-Doo! Abracadabra-Doo	The GPS in the mystery machine tells the viewers that the mystery is over and to move on with their lives and says he needs oil.
2010	Kick-Ass	After realizing that the world now has superheroes, Frank's son, Chris D'Amico, decides to become an evil villain and says the Joker's line, "Wait till they get a load of me!" as he fires a gun at the screen.
2010	16 Wishes	A collection of bloopers is shown and "If You Ever Been" is sung.
2010	Percy Jackson & the Olympians: The Lightning Thief	Sally expels her abusive husband, Gabe Ugliano, from her apartment. As Gabe walks into the kitchen to grab a beer, he finds the refrigerator locked, with a note from Percy not to open it under any circumstances. Gabe breaks the door open to find Medusa's head, turning him to stone.
2010	The A-Team	Murdock and Face of The A-Team's original television cast are seen.
2010	Irumbukkottai Murattu Singam	During the credits, they both ride off in the sunset.
2010	Furry Vengeance	During the credits, the humans and animals dance to the Transcenders version of "Insane in the Brain."
2010	Scooby-Doo! Camp Scare	The Specter who is shown at the end turns out to be real.
2010	Megamind	Minion finds Bernard in the washing machine and uses the "Forget Me Stick" on him.
2010	Gunless	A collection of outtakes during the credits.
2010	Score: A Hockey Musical	In a mid-credits scene, Farley Gordon and Edgar Gordon walking.
2010	Alice in Wonderland	Dead flowers bloom as the sun rises and vines move.
2010	Madrasapattinam	a series of montage images are shown, illustrating the transformation of the early 20th-century Madras into modern-day Chennai.
2010	The Last Song	The end credits show Ronnie driving away in her car and smiling to herself.
2010	Kattradhu Kalavu	In a post-credits scene, "Kattaradhu Kalavu" is sung.
2010	Kola Kolaya Mundhirika	During the credits, a collection of outtakes is shown and "Ada Engengum" is sung.
2010	Yathumaagi	A collection of outtakes and bloopers reel.
2010	Vacation with Derek	A collection of outtakes and bloopers during the credits.; In a post-credits scene, it shows one year where the new McDonald-Venturi member has been born, a boy named Simon. The entire family is shown to be smitten with Simon.
2010	The Other Guys	During the end credits statistics relating the disparity between benefits received by top executives of finance companies and those of NYPD officers are detailed, as are the beneficiaries of TARP bailouts.; A Ponzi Scheme is explained. A post-credits scene shows Hoitz telling Gamble a joke while Gamble intermittently asks for clarification. Gamble ultimately finds the joke unfunny, then orders food in Chinese, causing Wahlberg to break character.
2010	Buried	A lighter illuminates the name "Mark White" on the lid of the coffin, written by Paul earlier.
2010	Shrek Forever After	All of the characters are having an outdoor party at Shrek's swamp.
2010	Iron Man 2	In a cut-down scene from Thor, S.H.I.E.L.D. agent Phil Coulson reports the discovery of Mjolnir at the bottom of a crater in a desert in New Mexico.
2010	Machete	The closing credits announce further adventures for Machete.
2010	Thillalangadi	In a mid-credits scene, Krishna Kumar leaves with a new respect for his foe.; As the credits roll, A collection of behind-the-scenes and during the credits, Vijay, Editor Mohan and Mohan Raja.
2010	MacGruber	MacGruber, dressed in a bathrobe, plays the saxophone while sitting in a tree.
2010	Winter's Bone	Home movie footage of Ashlee playing in the snow.
2010	The Sorcerer's Apprentice	Horvath retrieves his hat from Balthazar's shop.
2010	Theeradha Vilaiyattu Pillai	A Collection of outtakes and during the credits.
2010	Anjaana Anjaani	As the credits roll, Akash and Kiara are shown 2 years later, married with their 2-year-old son.
2010	Veer	Veer's son "Veera" (Salman Khan) and Prithvi have a friendly brawl as credits roll.
2010	Jackass 3D	Before the credits roll, celebrating the end of the film in overly dramatic fashion.
2010	Unstoppable	Before the closing credits, it is revealed that Frank is promoted and later retires with full benefits. Will is reconciled with Darcy, who is expecting their second child, recovers from his injuries, and continues working with AWVR. Connie is promoted to Galvin's VP position, while it is implied that Galvin was fired for his poor handling of the incident. Ryan makes a full recovery, and Dewey, who is held accountable for causing the incident, is fired from his job and goes on to work in the fast food industry.
2010	Arrietty	During the end credits, Arrietty and her family are shown floating down a rivulet in a teapot with Spiller in search of a new home.
2010	Skyline	In the credits, a series of still images depict "Jarrod" protecting Elaine and their child from the aliens.
2010	The Fighter	The real-life brothers banter as the end credits run.
2010	Little Fockers	During the mid-credits scene, Jack views YouTube videos of Greg publicly mocking Jack during a speech promoting Sustengo.
2010	Orange	Ram and Jaanu end up together when the credits are rolling.
2010	Resident Evil: Afterlife	During a mid-credits scene in one of the aircraft, Jill Valentine, who went missing after the destruction of Raccoon City, (Note: As depicted in Resident Evil: Apocalypse.) is dictating the attack wearing the same mind control device used on Claire.
2010	The Last Airbender	Aang is "bending" the 4 elements.
2010	A Turtle's Tale: Sammy's Adventures	As the credits roll, it shows a pop-up book called Around the World in 50 Years which tells the story about the life of Sammy. The pop-up book first shows Sammy meeting his eldest grandchildren after they were hatched before it starts showing pop-up versions of several scenes from the film. The pop-up book also revealed what happened after Sammy and Shelly got married and they spent their honeymoon traveling into various locations around the world including Venice, San Francisco, Paris, Giza, Easter Island, Niagara Falls, Las Vegas, China, Brussels, and Sydney.; At the end of the credits, the "production babies" section shows a 2-D depiction of Sammy, Shelly, and their eight children. The eight children represent the eight babies born during the production of the film and they're following their parents.
2010	Boss Engira Bhaskaran	A collection of outtakes and "Ada Boss Boss" and "Mama Mama" is sung and featuring Jiiva in shown.
2010	The Extraordinary Adventures of Adèle Blanc-Sec	Ménard pursues Saint-Hubert with a rifle, still outraged that Saint-Hubert shot the pterosaur. Ménard is arrested by Caponi as two gorillas stare menacingly at Saint-Hubert.
2010	Despicable Me	Three of the Minions try to get through the gap over the white. In their last attempt, one of the Minions has ended up flying, accidentally destroying the movie screen. Then, the Minion is making hand puppets, imitating Gru, which steals his spotlight.
2010	Ramona and Beezus	During the ending credits, videos of Ramona and dancers on the dance floor during the wedding reception is shown.
2010	Camp Rock 2: The Final Jam	Several failed takes of the same scene are shown during the credits.
2010	Nanny McPhee and the Big Bang	In a post-credits scene, Ellie, an elephant conjured by Nanny McPhee to share Vincent's bed, is seen enjoying the magically operated Scratch-o-matic invented for the piglets.
2010	Goa	In the first mid-credits scene, Vinay and Sam are successful in their romance. The three boys eventually return to their native village, along with Roshini, Jessica, Danny, and Jack. There, a surprise awaits Ram, in the form of Nayantara.; In the second mid-credits scene, Suhasini falls in love with Madhan Kumar in Goa. As they hug, Madhan's nose begins to bleed, indicating that Suhasini has become a victim of Manmadhan.; A collection of outtakes and during the credits.; In a post-credits scene, the film parodies various themes prevalent in Tamil theater, as well as many popular Tamil songs. Director Venkat Prabhu makes several cameos throughout the film.
2010	Cats & Dogs: The Revenge of Kitty Galore	In a post-credits scene, Tinkles is in paradise complaining about lacking deworming cream for his itching rear until Calico reminds him that he is still connected.
2010	Toy Story 3	As the credits roll, this post-credits scene shows that life at Sunnyside is now far kinder and happier under the supervision of Barbie and Ken. All of the toys now rotate their time between the Caterpillar Room and the Butterfly Room equally, and no toy is left in the Caterpillar Room too long. An Emperor Zurg toy, a few other toys and the Army men are also seen landing in Sunnyside and receive a warm welcome from the residents. Ken and Barbie also keep in touch with the toys living at Bonnie's through letters hidden in her bag, as it is shown that Woody and the others have fully settled in with Bonnie's other toys and are enjoying their new life together. The last scene shows Jessie taking advantage of Buzz Lightyear's Spanish mode as they perform a pasodoble to "Hay Un Amigo En Mi", the Spanish version of "You've Got a Friend in Me".
2010	Misty Island Rescue	Diesel 10 watches the engines at the Sodor Search and Rescue Center's grand opening from above a cliff, promising they'll be laughing on the other side of their boilers soon with an evil laugh, foreshadowing Day of the Diesels.
2010	How Do You Know	George is heard drunkenly singing "Tonight, I'm in a romantic mood, yeah!".
2010	Singam	in a post-credits scene, After that, he resigns his job publicly in a felicitation function organized for him. Singam is seen with Kavya heading back to Nallur. He is stopped briefly by Ramanathan, who offers an undercover mission, which he accepts. (Note: This sets up the plot of Singam II.)
2010	Scott Pilgrim vs. the World	Following the credits, "THE END" appears in an 8-bit font, prompting a cartoon Scott Pilgrim (reminiscent of the tie-in video game) to appear, demolish the logo, and then teleport away.
2010	The Back-Up Plan	There are outtakes and bloopers.
2010	Break Ke Baad	The end credits show that the two are married and have a daughter named Sara.
2010	The Crazies	A minute or so into the credits there is a news report stating that there was an explosion at the chemical plant in Ogden Marsh.
2010	Easy A	At the end of the closing credits Brandon can be heard making a noise of excitement.; The end credits are appearing through a road while cars and bikes pass near the audience.; As the credits end, there is a faint groan.
2010	The Expendables	The "Expendables" ride down the street on their motorcycles.
2010	Band Baaja Baaraat	As the credits roll from right to left, the reprise of "Ainvayi Ainvayi" plays with Bittoo and Shruthi getting married and dancing. Plus, it ends with them talking to each other.
2010	The Yellow Sea	In an ambiguous mid-credit scene, Gu-nam's wife arrives home by train.
2010	Rubber	During the credits, the opening scene plays again, but this time from different angles, revealing that Chad is not speaking to anyone.
2010	Insidious	One of the demons and the old lady, are smiling at the camera before blowing out a candle.
2011	The Change-Up	Dave and Jamie get high and visit the aquarium, while Mitch and Sabrina have sex for the first time, and Mitch sends Dave the porno he starred in.
2011	The Smurfs	During the credits, photos are shown of Patrick and Grace becoming parents as well as of the Smurfs' village with influences from their adventure in New York City.; Gargamel is in a coma until Azrael wakes him up when he licks his face, then Gargamel looks at the camera/audience and asks "What are you looking at?" before zapping it with his wand.; A smurf appears on top on the Columbia Pictures logo, waving goodbye to the audience.
2011	Sharpay's Fabulous Adventure	During the end credits, Sharpay receives a visit from her brother, Ryan, who is currently on break from a musical he is touring the country in. Boi ends up scurrying out of the room, with Sharpay following afterwards. Ryan then lies back on Sharpay's bed — which lifts and closes on him.
2011	Ilaignan	In a mid-credits scene, "Great Ship Australia Narrator" and "Ethanai Kanam" are sung.
2011	Best Player	In the ending credits, you see prom photos of Ash, Tracy, Chris, and Quincy.
2011	Open Season 3	In the ending credits, Doug and Alistair reveal a slideshow of themselves enjoying their tour around the world as they make their way back home.
2011	He-Man	A collection of bloopers and outtakes runs during the end credits.
2011	The Hangover Part II	Photos from that night show: Stu getting his tattoo; the guys at the strip club; Stu with Kimmy; Kimmy "doing it" with Stu; Teddy losing his finger playing a knife game; Alan playing with the monkey; Chow and the guys doing drugs; Chow and Phil playing with a gun.
2011	Rise of the Planet of the Apes	Will's neighbor, who is a pilot, is in the airport with a nosebleed. A computer simulation of all the flight connections after the pilot had boarded the plane is shown. As the plane touches down in Europe, countless yellow lines spread out to other destinations, which implies that the virus the pilot has is spreading.
2011	Mars Needs Moms	Ki shows her art to female Martians with jetpacks; Ki's hippie television shows are broadcast to the Martians; The Trash Claws dump Nanny-bots into lava; Male Martians change the diapers of hatchlings. The Supervisor also changes a hatchling's diaper but gets a face full of urine; Gribble, Ki, and Two-Cat rig a NASA rover to broadcast a live feed of Ki's art back to Earth, which Milo sees on his computer.; Then, as the credits roll, the excerpts from behind the scenes of the movie are shown.
2011	Mankatha	A collection of outtakes runs during the end credits.; Laughing, Ha Ha Ha Ha! and Ajith Kumar and Venkat Prabhu.
2011	Madea's Big Happy Family	A collection of outtakes and bloopers runs during the end credits.
2011	Bridesmaids	There is some funny footage incorporated into the end credits, related to the wedding performance of "Hold On" by Wilson Phillips. This is followed by an extra scene featuring Megan and the air marshal.
2011	Lemonade Mouth	During the credits, Olivia mails the entire story of the band's genesis to her father, wrapping up with news of Lemonade Mouth performing at Madison Square Garden, with Scott as their new rhythm guitarist.; In a post-credits scene (exclusive to the DVD edition), Lemonade Mouth is invited to an interview. On air, the interviewer asks about Mo and Scott's relationship, raising suspicion from her father, until Olivia interrupts to reveal that she and Wen are dating. After the interview, they perform "Livin' on a High Wire", with Mo's father and the audience enjoying the performance with Lemonade.
2011	Diary of a Wimpy Kid: Rodrick Rules	Greg and Rowley are seen posting the video of Greg's mom dancing at the talent show on YouTube, and the video goes viral. However, Rodrick finds out and exclaims, "Greg, you are so dead!".
2011	Fast Five	Hobbs is given a file by Monica Fuentes concerning the hijack of a military convoy in Berlin, where he discovers a recent photo of Dom's girlfriend Letty, is alive.
2011	Spy Kids: All the Time in the World	The shot begins with an extreme close-up of the dog's face. It cuts to a medium shot of Argonaut sitting alone on the floor in a hallway. He stares blankly at the camera and lets out a loud, resonant burp. Following the burp, he politely says, "Excuse me," before the screen cuts to black.
2011	Delhi Belly	Producer-actor Aamir Khan is seen dancing in a song and dance performance as the credits start rolling.
2011	Friends with Benefits	During the first part of the credits, a pair of hands plays with the layout of the credits as they appear on screen and even control certain aspects like controlling the audio volume and other various settings of the credits.; In a post-credits scene, Dylan and Jamie watch outtakes from the fictional romantic comedy seen throughout the film.; There is a faint groan.
2011	Daydream Nation	As the credits roll, a background of the movie's recurring warning poster, which reads, "Important: Travel in Pairs".
2011	Rio	The first round of credits (before they roll) runs during a reprise of "Real in Rio", sung by most of the main characters as they fly through the jungle. After that, there's a scene of a plucked Nigel getting humiliated by Mauro the marmoset, who takes a picture of his featherless form.
2011	Transformers: Dark of the Moon	Simmons kissing Mearing after the final battle.
2011	Super 8	The final version of the movie the children have been filming, called The Case, is presented in its entirety during the credits.
2011	Justin Bieber: Never Say Never	Additional footage plays throughout all of the closing credits. And when all of the credits have scrolled, there is scene on the same computer at the beginning of the movie, sends a video of a young Justin Bieber To all of the friends on the computer, and then it shuts off.
2011	Too Big to Fail	As credits roll, an epilogue reveals that credit conditions did not ease until 2009 when the market freefall was arrested. Meanwhile, the funds received by the banks facilitated new highs in Wall Street compensation, which rose to $135 billion by 2010.
2011	The Ballad of Nessie	A mid-credits scene reveals that MacFroogal's golf course is flooded as well. MacFroogal breaks down in tears as he and his assistants sail away on part of a large sign, while the water knocks off some of the letters on the remaining part, leaving the word "MacFool" behind.
2011	Something Borrowed	In a mid-credits sceene, Darcy surprises Ethan in London. He tries to ignore her, briskly walking away. A title card reads, "To Be Continued...", intending to set up a sequel.
2011	Soul Surfer	During the credits of Soul Surfer, real footage of Bethany Hamilton is shown. Many of the scenes are from a previous documentary, and they include Bethany surfing as a pro, Bethany surfing for the first time after the attack, Bethany taking 5th place at Nationals, Bethany winning 1st place the following year, Bethany going to Thailand with World Vision, an interview with her there, Bethany throwing out the first pitch of the MLB 2004 season in New York (although she wears an Oakland A's uniform), Bethany visiting troops at Ramstein Air Base, Bethany winning the Teen Choice "Courage Award", Bethany winning the "Best Comeback of the Year" ESPY, Bethany responding in a TV interview "I think? I know I'm going to surf again." This is followed by more family footage of Bethany that mirrors actual scenes from the movie; they include young Bethany and Alana before the accident, Bethany at the hospital, Bethany skateboarding, Bethany dropping fruit in the kitchen, and Bethany getting help with her hair. More videos and photos of Bethany, her family, and friends are shown and followed by title cards that say "The End" and "... is the beginning".
2011	Beats, Rhymes & Life: The Travels of A Tribe Called Quest	As the credits roll, the various interviewees introduce themselves. After that, the second part of the video "Jazz (We've Got)/Buggin' Out" (beginning at 3:30 in the video) is shown.
2011	Payanam	In a post-credits scene, the passengers happily leave the flight, farewell each other and agree to meet again. The terrorists' names are revealed to be Yasin (the leader), Munna, Omar, Anwar and Abdul.
2011	Kempe Gowda	As the end credits roll, Kempegowda is seen with Kavya heading back to Mysuru, and as when Kempegowda is stopped briefly by the Home Minister who offers an undercover mission, to which Kempegowda willingly agrees.
2011	Singam Puli	During the credits, Shiva and Ashok Kumar voicing.
2011	Paul	Right before the scrolling end credits, there is an image of the cover of Clive and Graeme's Graphic Novel "Paul", which has an illustration of Paul—except he has three breasts, a reference to the woman with three breasts on the cover of their other book seen throughout the movie.
2011	Alvin and the Chipmunks: Chipwrecked	The Chipmunks, Chipettes, and Dave return home to Los Angeles on an airplane as Alvin screws with the PA System, which causes a cart to knock Dave over as he angrily screams "ALVINNN!!!"
2011	Johnny English Reborn	Johnny English tells Kate Sumner, "I don't know how to thank you." She responds, "I'd love a takeaway." Johnny says, "Consider it done." He then gets up, looks at a takeout menu with dissatisfaction, and finds a CD of "In the Hall of the Mountain King" by Edvard Grieg. After loading the CD, he spends the rest of the scene preparing a meal with ingredients he finds in the fridge and kitchen. At one point, Kate peeks in from around the corner.
2011	The Rum Diary	The end credits explain that Kemp returns to New York, marries Chenault, and becomes a successful journalist, finally finding his voice as a writer.
2011	Puss in Boots	There is a dance sequence during the credits.
2011	Thor	Erik Selvig is taken to a S.H.I.E.L.D. facility, where Nick Fury opens a briefcase and asks him to study the Tesseract, which Fury says may hold untold power. An invisible Loki prompts Selvig to agree, and he does.
2011	Glee: The 3D Concert Movie	There is an encore performance of "Somebody to Love" after the initial cast credits and a viral video of the mini-warbler performing "Raise Your Glass" is shown during the credits.
2011	Hop	There is a scene during the credits and "I Want Candy" is sung.; Fred the Easter Bunny is giving a woman an Easter basket in China.
2011	Pirates of the Caribbean: On Stranger Tides	A voodoo doll of Jack Sparrow crafted by Blackbeard washes ashore and is found by Angelica.
2011	Mausam	In a mid-credits scene, "Mallo Malli" is sung.
2011	Arthur Christmas	One of the elf-lowering-cables descends, pauses, then lifts up an elf, who proceeds to throw snowballs at the screen until it's all black.
2011	Zookeeper	As the credits start rolling, it shows outtakes of the film and the animals singing to the tune of "More Than a Feeling."
2011	Deiva Thirumagal	In a mid-credits scene, Krishna returns to work at Victor's chocolate factory.
2011	The Twilight Saga: Breaking Dawn – Part 1	A letter is delivered to Aro and the Volturi. Aro reads the message, which states that Carlisle has added another vampire (Bella) to his coven. The two other Volturi banter about how Carlisle is growing his coven and that the Volturis' dispute with the Cullens is over. However, Aro replies that their business with the Cullens goes beyond a human... they have something he wants. Aro then signals two guards to take away the messenger girl, who then screams in protest.
2011	Kandaen	During the credits, the movie ends, Vasanth and Saami have a successful operation and happily return to India to get married and run an airport.; During the credits, "Enge en Idhayam" is sung and a collection of outtakes is shown.
2011	Green Lantern	Sinestro takes the yellow ring and places it on his finger, causing his green suit and eyes to turn yellow.
2011	Mayakkam Enna	During the credits, Karthik also thanks Madhesh where the film ends.
2011	The Help	Aibileen walks down a long road.
2011	Jack and Jill	More clips of twins being interviewed are shown as in the beginning of the film. The interviews last the entire length of the end credits with the twins describing funny situations and ridiculing their siblings.; A lone twin from one of the documentary interviews is shown. Although he says nothing, he does a trick, pretending to pump up his stomach and then pop it.
2011	The Muppets	There is a montage of various scenes with the main characters, guest stars, and the Muppets singing "Mah Na Mah Na" during the credits.; In a mid-credits scene, Richman, after being struck in the head by Gonzo's bowling ball, willingly returns the theatre to the Muppets.
2011	Don 2	During the credits, "Dushman Mera" is sung.
2011	Winnie the Pooh	The Backson is revealed to really exist but is shown to be gentle and good and he follows the trail, falling into a pit.
2011	Captain America: The First Avenger	In a cut-down scene from The Avengers, Steve Rogers converses with Nick Fury at a gym. A short trailer for The Avengers is shown.
2011	Pilla Zamindar	During the mid-credits scene, Ammiraju hires a gangster, Bangkok, to kidnap Sindhu and ruin her life as well as her reputation. But Chamki gets kidnapped instead because of his disguise. PJ's friends also informed him of Sindhu's kidnapping, but after witnessing that Sindhu had just heard this and standing unscathed, they realized what had happened after Pulakesi searched for Chamki. Unknown about this blunder committed by Bangkok, Ammiraju calls PJ to tell him that he will succeed in his motive. PJ tries to stop him, but Ammiraju doesn't listen. He goes to commit a crime, and his friends have fun, only to realize Bangkok's mistake later on.
2011	The Thing	In a mid-credits scene, Thule's helicopter pilot Matias returns and views the ruined station and the husk of the Edvard-Adam-creature with horror. Colin has committed suicide, using a straight razor. Lars shoots at Matias, ordering him to open his mouth. Lars's dog, thought dead, emerges and runs away. Lars orders Matias to start the helicopter and give chase, leading to the events of the 1982 film.
2011	Small Fry	In a post-credits scene, Mini Zurg is left with the electronic belt buckle as his sole companion, much to his delight.
2011	Hall Pass	Kathy Griffin is at the party.; Then Gary is talking to his wife where she mentions that maybe she would give him a hall pass as well. Gary imagines how that would be like; which includes multiple murders and Gary going to jail. However, he says that he would do it.; Near the end of credits Fred is in the van seemingly masturbating. Then the police pull up next to the van and Grace's head pops up and she explains that she is giving him a "flowjob" a fake blowjob.; Stephen Merchant/Gary digs graves and one of the corpses rises and scares him.
2011	Horrible Bosses	Bloopers are shown.
2011	Mr. Popper's Penguins	Animated penguins dance around. And, "No penguins were harmed in the making of this film. Jim Carrey, on the other hand, was bitten mercilessly. But he had it coming." is shown.: A penguin is heard squawking briefly.
2011	Saving Winston	A slow zoom out from a large, shady tree next to a white wooden fence in a field.
2011	Goon	Footage of Douglas Smith as an ice hockey enforcer, on whose autobiography this is based, is shown towards the end of the closing credits.
2011	Breakaway	In a mid-credits scene, "Shera Di Kaum" is sung.
2011	Happy Feet Two	At the very end of the credits, we see the background usually reserved for Porky Pig in the Warner Bros.' Looney Tunes cartoons. Instead of Porky, it's Sven, who says, "Ja, the Svend", as the words The Svend appears in script beneath him.
2011	A Monster in Paris	In a post-credits scene, Francœur, Emile, Lucille, and Raoul are shown solving the Great flood by dropping sunflower seeds which have been enhanced with super fertilizer, consuming large amounts of water and growing to large size.; In another post-credits scene, Albert and a street thief are shown in a cell, badly singing much to Maynott's horror.
2011	The Sitter	During the end credits, it is revealed that Noah got a new girlfriend, Slater grew up and got a job at the entertainment industry, Blithe gave up her pop culture obsession and started inventing perfumes as an adult, Rodrigo gave up being a pyromaniac, Karl was hospitalized after being beat up by Tina's gang, and Julio died due to burning to death.
2011	The Descendants	During the credits, Matt, Scottie and Alex eat ice cream together as they watch March of the Penguins, covering themselves in a blanket that Elizabeth had at the hospital.
2011	Venghai	In a post-credits scene, Selvam returns to Pandiapuram, where he happily reunites with Radhika and his family.
2011	Cars 2	During the credits, Lightning McQueen and Mater are shown to be driving through various locations around the world before finally returning to Radiator Springs.
2011	Mouna Guru	In a mid-credits scene, Karuna and Aarthi get married, where he works as a teacher in a deaf-dumb school.
2011	The Inbetweeners Movie	The credits play over various clips of the guys goofing around on their trip and then being greeted by their parents at the airport.
2012	The Avengers	In the mid-credits scene, The Other reports to his master, Thanos.; In the post-credits scene, the Avengers silently eat shawarma in the aftermath of the Battle of New York.
2012	The Grey	The alpha wolf lies on the ground taking two breaths, the second being a long, deep, and final exhale... similar to a wolf shot and killed by Ottway earlier in the film. Ottway lies against the wolf, viewed from behind.
2012	The Guilt Trip	There are outtakes of Seth Rogen and Barbra Streisand's banter in the car during their cross-country drive.
2012	Brave	The Witch's crow comes to the castle to deliver the Witch's carvings, which Mérida bought in exchange for the spell.
2012	Wreck-It Ralph	During the first half of the end credits the main characters are shown interacting with the other video game and arcade game characters. As the Walt Disney Pictures logo appears in the end some glitches known as a kill screen are shown in the style of Pac-Man.
2012	Casa de mi padre	At the end of the credits, there's a short commercial featuring Dan Haggerty, promoting Haggerty cigarettes.; Armando and Sonia perform a duet as background for the end credits, after the word "OLé!' has filled the screen.
2012	Django Unchained	The three slaves stare out from the cage that was in transit to the mining company. One asks, "Who was that n—-?", and the movie's title appears on screen immediately after.
2012	Mirror Mirror	Snow White leads the dwarfs and wedding guests in a Bollywood-style song and dance number during the credits.
2012	Agent Vinod	During the credits, "Pyaar ki Pungi" is sung.
2012	Paranormal Activity 4	The extra scene is made up of handheld footage by a Spanish-speaking man. He looks at a botánica from across the street and says in Spanish, "There it is... let's go." Once inside, he asks, "What is this?" He looks at a figure of Jesus on the cross and down some aisles before saying, "This is all witchcraft. I'm leaving." He's startled by a woman (presumably the shopkeeper) who warns in Spanish, "This is just the beginning." The man quickly leaves.
2012	Ek Main Aur Ekk Tu	Both remain good friends, with an ending note from Rahul claiming that he is finally happy with his life, as the credits roll in "Kar Chalana Shuru Tu" is sung.
2012	The Amazing Spider-Man	Curt Connors, in a prison cell at Ravencroft, speaks with a man in the shadows who asks if Peter Parker knows the truth about his father. Connors replies "no", and demands Peter to be left alone before the man vanishes.
2012	The Pirates! In an Adventure with Scientists!	Pirate Captain tells Charles to grow a beard and sends him off exploring.; Victoria crashes into a jungle where the animals whom she previously was going to eat are now preparing to eat her instead.; A wanted poster shows that Pirate Captain is now worth 100,000 doubloons.; The crew makes Pirate Captain his own trophy.; The Pirate King takes the trophy back from Black Bellamy.; After pining for female companionship throughout the movie, Charles finally discovers girls on the Galapagos Islands.; The pirates set a course for adventure and are devoured by a sea monster, who then spits them out.
2012	Iron Sky	At the end of the credits, the planet Mars is revealed with an artificial satellite in orbit.
2012	Premium Rush	There is cellphone footage of the aftermath of Joseph Gordon-Levitt's accident and injury on set. First, Joe's bike is shown on the ground behind a cab, which has its rear windshield shattered from where he crashed and ended up. Gordon-Levitt then appears, showing blood dripping down his forearm from his wrist and hand. He says, "This is cool. I mean, kids, don't try this at home or nothing, but, like...." The recorder cuts him off and says, "Seriously, let's get you to the hospital."
2012	An American Girl: McKenna Shoots for the Stars	During the credits, "Rock What You Go!" song starts.
2012	Hit and Run	Annie's interviewer tries to air out his hotboxed office as Annie knocks on his door outside. He manages to put away his bong before Annie enters anyway. They hit it off, and she discovers that he's actually Debbie's brother. He offers her the job, and she hugs him.
2012	Thadaiyara Thaakka	In a post-credits scene, even though Selva and Priya take care of Gayathri, she discovers that she is pregnant with Maha's child. At the same time, Selva and Priya learns of Gayathri's origins from the TV news. Unfortunately, Gayathri kills herself.
2012	ATM	During the Credits they keep showing more of the "unknown" man's setup's at various ATM locations
2012	Battleship	Back on shore, the crew and Mick all get medals, including a posthumous one to Stone, after the ceremony, Adm. Shane leads Hopper off to discuss his 'Terms of Surrender' over a meal.
2012	Blue Mountain Mystery	Thomas visits Victor and Luke at the Steamworks, where he finds Rheneas painted yellow like Victor when he came to Sodor, and he is surprised by this.
2012	Pitch Perfect	At the end of the year, the Bellas perform a medley arranged by Beca, including songs like "Price Tag", "Don't You (Forget About Me)", the ending credits song for The Breakfast Club, (one of Jesse's favorite movies which acts as an apology for their fall out earlier), "Just the Way You Are", "Give Me Everything" and "Party in the U.S.A.". The Bellas emerge victorious over the Treblemakers and win the national championship with their medley, breaking their six-time losing streak. After the performance, Beca and Jesse kiss. Six months later, auditions are held to recruit new members and the Bellas get the privilege of choosing the audition song with Beca still among them as Aubrey officially graduated and Beca decided to stay in college after all.
2012	Hitchcock	Hitchcock is standing in front of the movie screen, lit from behind like his trademark silhouette shot. Then he slowly walks off the screen.
2012	Eega/Naan Ee	Before the credits roll, the movie ends with Nani singing "My Name is Nani/Nani En Peru".; The young girl is impressed with the story of the fly her father narrates. During the credits, her father recounts the fate of a drunken thief who broke into Bindu's house earlier in the story, and who ultimately turns his life around after overhearing a loving speech given to Nani by Bindu and mistakenly believing that Bindu was speaking to him. In Naan Ee, Bindu visits the pet hospital. The Hindi version did not play this scene.
2012	ParaNorman	There is an extra half-minute scene after the credits of ParaNorman. It's a time-lapse sequence that quickly goes through the steps of how Norman was designed and constructed for stop-motion animation. After he's been assembled and painted on the worktable, Norman gets up and walks away.
2012	Hope Springs	Kay and Arnold renew their wedding vows in a beach ceremony attended by their children, just like they dreamed.
2012	A Turtle's Tale 2: Sammy's Escape from Paradise	in the credit scene is seen that Big D and Jax are trapped into a fishbowl owned by the aquarium manager, now demoted to a security guard.
2012	Madea's Witness Protection	A collection of outtakes and bloopers runs during the end credits.
2012	Ice Age: Continental Drift	The film's characters, shown occasionally with their voice actors, sing the movie's theme song, "We Are" by Keke Palmer.
2012	Attakathi	Post-credits it reveals that Dinakaran studied hard and managed to become a teacher, while taking care of his mother and has finally tied the knot.
2012	Son of Sardaar	In a mid-credits scene, "Po Po Po" is sung and featuring Salman Khan.
2012	Parental Guidance	Family pics of the principal cast and crew members are shown. For the remainder of the credits, there are pictures of the cast from scenes in the movie as well as candid shots from the set. The credits end with one final group shot of the cast and crew.; There is an outtake from the men's room scene featuring Billy Crystal/Artie Decker complaining that he's out of toilet paper and cracking a joke about getting five singles for a fiver.
2012	Dr. Seuss' The Lorax	Most characters from the film are shown dancing and playing around of the song, "Let It Grow (Celebrate the World)" by Ester Dean before the credits roll.
2012	Vettai	In a post-credits scenes, show that Thirumurthy is again congratulated by the local police but gives equal credit to his brother as well. Through this praise, Gurumurthy also gets to join the police force.
2012	Ek Tha Tiger	In a mid-credits scene, reveals that the couple is rumored to have been sighted in cities around the world, including Venice, Cape Town, Zurich, and London.; During the credits, "Mashallah" is sung.
2012	The Campaign	Marty, along with Cam as his chief of staff, leading a Congressional hearing investigating the Motch brothers and their connection to Tim Wattley, who's revealed to be an international terrorist, leading to the arrest of the Motch brothers.
2012	Talaash: The Answer Lies Within	In a post-credits scene, two workers put a "Caution" sign on the same accident spot.
2012	Maattrraan	In a mid-credits scene, Akilan is conferred national recognition for bravery. He later marries Anjali, and they become parents to twins.
2012	Ambuli	In a mid-credits scene, A final shot is shown which is to happen in Dehradun, where the box in which Ambuli is being carried. The box slowly starts moving a little and cracks suddenly. It is to be understood that Ambuli escapes from the box and sets on his next hunt. The film ends with a line in Tamil, which translates to Ambuli's hunt will continue.
2012	Barfi!	the happy days of Barfi and Jhilmil being shown and the credits roll.
2012	Oru Kal Oru Kannadi	In a mid-credits scene, Saravanan and Partha walk off the marriage hall. Just then, Meera comes and hugs Saravanan, hence reuniting with him.; During the credits, collection of outtakes is shown and "Akila Akila" is sung.; A montage of images of Arya, Udhayanidhi Stalin, Santhanam and M. Rajesh is shown.
2012	Ordinary	The end-credits shows them assigned together on a new common route.
2012	Girl vs. Monster	During the credits, Henry and Sadie are shown having no fear by doing what most scares them. Later that day, Skylar and Ryan sing at Ryan's party in his basement, and Myra becomes friends with Skylar.; In a post-credits scene, Deimata tries to escape the hunting unit by blowing on the glass to it, which cracks and breaks as her laugh is heard.
2012	Nativity 2: Danger in the Manger	Similar to the first movie, videos of the movie's children are shown.
2012	A Werewolf Boy	A sequence in the ending credits shows Chul-soo building a snowman.
2012	Jab Tak Hai Jaan	As the credits roll, a collection of behind-the-scenes runs with Yash Chopra starting to direct before that.; In a post-credits scene, it writes and ends with "and he lives on... forever."
2012	Rise of the Guardians	The Easter Eggs, Tooth Fairies, Yeti and Elves are seen returning the sleeping children to their homes and beds.
2012	Paperman	As the credits roll, they are seen chatting happily with each other at a restaurant table with the lipstick-marked paper between them. The picture disappears, but the paper remains in the credits until it flies off.
2012	CZ12	We see bloopers, outtakes and behind-the-scenes clips during the credits. There are also a couple of voice overs by Jackie Chan; the second of which accompanies a video retrospective of some of Chan's greatest stunts, featuring clips from many of his movies. The retrospective ends with a badge from the Guinness Book of World Records proclaiming Jackie having done the most stunts ever as an actor.
2012	Houba! On the Trail of the Marsupilami	During the credits, Pochero receives a video message on his phone from Céline Dion, who was told by Dan about his performance to save the Marsupilami and is very impressed. She would love to come and sing in Chiquito, and perhaps even do a duet on stage with the general singing " I'm Alive." By kissing his screen, Pochero accidentally deletes the message.
2012	The Adventures of Jinbao	During the credits, Jinbao is back on Earth as he spars with his Captain using the moves that he learned in Merryland as well as drinking alcohol. Their sparring ends in a draw.
2012	The Dictator	There are various epilogue scenes, outtakes, and one blooper.
2012	This is 40	After the main credits roll, there's an extended alternate take of Catherine's ad-libbing insults during the meeting with Debbie, Pete, and the school principal.
2012	Wanderlust	There are outtakes and bloopers.; There is a scene from the show The Real Housewives of Atlanta.
2013	The Kings of Summer	After the credits, Biaggio is seen once again residing in the house in the woods.
2013	Iron Man 3	Tony Stark finishes telling his story to Bruce Banner, who had fallen asleep near the beginning. Stark starts telling the story again.
2013	Texas Chainsaw 3D	Heather's adopted parents show up at the Carson estate to visit Heather, intending on greedily splitting her assets. As they wait in front of the door, Leatherface comes through the door with his chainsaw in hand.
2013	Monsters University	A slug monster (who originates from a scene where he tries to run to class but his slow speed prevents him from doing to) finally arrives at the classroom for his first day in school, only to find the classroom empty except the janitor who tells him that the school year is already over and he missed it, much to the slug monster’s dismay.
2013	The Smurfs 2	During the credits, The Smurfs bid farewell to the Winslows, then return home with Vexy and Hackus to celebrate Smurfette's birthday.; In two post-credit sequences, Gargamel and Azrael are pulled into the vortex, sending them back to their castle, and they later fight.
2013	Pacific Rim	The scene they cut back to occurs after the kaiju "baby" died in Hong Kong. After what appears to be another "birthing", it's actually Hannibal Chau who emerges from the kaiju by cutting himself through the skin of the beast with his butterfly knife. He then angrily asks, "Where is my GODDAMN shoe?"
2013	Singam 2	In a post-credits scene, "Singam Dance" is sung.
2013	Despicable Me 2	Three Minions named Kevin, Stuart, and Bob are competing for the auditions of the film's spin-off, which came out two years after this film. They try to perform various escapades, before falling through the borders of the screen.
2013	Metallica: Through the Never	The credits roll to scenes of the band performing "Orion" to the empty stadium. Trip takes a seat; the final shot is of the still-closed leather bag which belonged to Cliff Burton on the Master of Puppets tour.
2013	Jay & Silent Bob's Super Groovy Cartoon Movie!	After the credits, Jay and Silent Bob are visited by Stan Lee, who wishes to speak to them about the "Avenger Initiative". Shortly after, they are all picked up by Doc Brown, who requests their help in getting back to the future.
2013	Kick-Ass 2	Chris D'Amico, the son of Frank D'Amico and whose supervillain name was The Motherfucker, was still alive and was in a hospital, but his limbs and genitals were eaten by a shark, where he was trying to drink his water.
2013	Thor: The Dark World	Volstagg and Sif take the Reality Stone to the Collector.; Thor returns to Earth to share a romantic moment with Jane Foster, then the scene shifts to show a frost monster still running wild in London.
2013	Masani	In a mid-credits scene, Swami, Village Head and Devanna Gounder.; The credits roll concludes with a zoom-in, jump-scare image of the scary, ghost-like girl.
2013	Free Birds	In the mid-credits, Jake returns in S.T.E.V.E. moments after leaving Reggie and Jenny. With a chicken and a duck in his wings, Jake starts to tell the turkeys about the turducken, implicating that Reggie's actions as well as Standish's "erasure" from history have had unexpected consequences in the present day.
2013	The Internship	The beginning credits are shown and presented using many Google products. There are also multiple still shots using Billy's photo app idea, Exchange-O-Gram.
2013	Austenland	A mid-credits scene reveals that Elizabeth has bought Austenland and turned it into a theme park, assisted by Colonel Andrews. Mr. Wattlesbrook now works as a garbage picker, Captain East does a strip show to Amelia's delight, Martin is snubbed by the guests, and Jane and Nobley are still in love.; During the credits, 'Hot in Here" is sung.
2013	What If	Chantry goes to Taiwan as planned and makes a big ad campaign for some canned beverage. She takes Wallace with her and he goes to medical school in Tai pei where he becomes a doctor. They both then go to Mumbai and eventually head home. The scene ends with them inviting everyone to their wedding.
2013	Turbo	The "can't tuck" snail finally tucks into his shell, and eventually finds bigger trouble trying to get out.; Turbo says "and it looks like the winner is!"
2013	An American Girl: Saige Paints the Sky	During the credits, back at the hot air balloon show, Saige, Tessa, Gabi, and Dylan (now all best friends) ride a hot air balloon Saige designed as the film ends.
2013	Trance	After the closing credits have rolled, the audience hears the familiar five taps on the glass window that was an iconic audible signature throughout the film.
2013	The Heat	According to the end credits, Gina's Boobs are played by Jessica Chaffin's Boobs.
2013	Bombay Talkies	In a mid-credits scene, "Apna Bombay Talkies" is sung.
2013	Superman: Unbound	Brainiac's remains in the Fortress of Solitude glow, indicating that Brainiac still has some degree of his power.
2013	Veera	In the mid-credits scene, Veera heads to another mission in New York.
2013	Chennai Express	In a post-credits scene, "Lungi Dance" is sung.
2013	Gravity	The credits end with the sound of a radio transmission and a man counting down: "Three, two, one, mark."
2013	Agent Carter	In a mid-credits scene, Dum Dum Dugan is seen poolside with Stark, marveling at two women wearing the newly created bikinis.
2013	My Awkward Sexual Adventure	During the credits, with the sounds of the couple preparing for their first time together, juxtaposed with a shot of them blissfully asleep in bed together.
2013	Karuppampatti	In a mid-credits scenes, the resolution sees Kothai having to make crucial decisions about his future - whether to remain in Paris and fully embrace his new life, or return to Karuppampatti and attempt to bridge the gap between his two worlds.
2013	Theeya Velai Seiyyanum Kumaru	During the credits, "Thiruttu Pasanga" is sung and a collection of outtakes with Vishal and Samantha Ruth Prabhu is shown.
2013	Now You See Me	In a post-credits scene available on the Blu-ray version only, the group is driving through the desert and stops at a Las Vegas abandoned sign yard. They go down into a cellar and see a bunch of wooden crates. Reeves asks, "Is that our new gear?" Atlas responds, "There better not be matching jumpsuits, you know I don't wear spandex". Wilder notices that the boxes are locked and Reeves points out "the cards". McKinney asks, "What, what cards?" Atlas asks, "Sorry, what do you mean what cards?!" McKinney feels around his pockets making a face and says, "Okay".
2013	Naveena Saraswathi Sabatham	In a post-credits scene, the film mentions behind the scenes.; A collections of outtakes are shown during the end credits.
2013	The Right Kind of Wrong	In a mid-credits scene, the bear is shown again.
2013	Legends of Oz: Dorothy's Return	Some various scenes of the townspeople rebuilding their homes, businesses, and farms.
2013	Teen Beach Movie	A collection of outtakes and bloopers during the credits.; Lela, Tanner, Butchy, Seacat, Giggles and Struts wash up into the real world. A modern-day surfer thinks they are lost and allows them to use his cellphone, which they marvel at as they attempt to use it
2013	Jannal Oram	The end-credits shows them assigned together again on a common route to Kollimalai.
2013	Moondru Per Moondru Kadal	In a mid-credits scene, ("Love is not to be asked but to be given").
2013	Fast & Furious 6	In a mid-credits scene, Han is involved in a car pursuit in Tokyo when he is suddenly broadsided by an oncoming Mercedes-Benz W140. (Note: As depicted in The Fast and the Furious: Tokyo Drift (2006)) The driver walks away after leaving Letty's cross necklace by the crash, and calls Dom, saying: "You don't know me, but you're about to", as Han's car explodes.
2013	The Hangover Part III	The morning after Alan's wedding, Phil groggily awakens in a trashed bedroom with Alan and Cassie. As he tries to learn what happened, then Stu staggers into the room giggling. He is dressed in women's panties and has large breasts. As they all wonder what happened, Alan finally remembers that the wedding cake was a gift from Mr. Chow, who obviously drugged it. Mr. Chow enters the room completely naked and proudly proclaims that "It was a sick night, bitches!" Then the monkey from the previous movie drops down on Stu.
2013	Peeples	The Peeples family participates together in Wade's outdoor musical performance for children. It is a reprise of the children's song that Wade was singing in the movie's opening scene. This is followed by the Peeples family, now including Wade, taking a family photo in front of their house in Sag Bay.
2013	I Give It A Year	The parents are arguing over a restaurant bill.; Josh and Danny are talking about the pros and cons of marrying Nat.
2013	The Croods	A trio of elephant mice from earlier in the film appears onscreen and trumpets a little song.
2013	Kadal	During the credits, "Anbin Vaasale" is sung.
2013	ABCD: Any Body Can Dance	In a post-credits scene, "Psycho Re" is sung.
2013	Romans	A post-credits scene shows two men in Santa Claus costumes celebrating Christmas with the elderly. The men are revealed to be Akash and Shibu, who have once again escaped from prison.
2013	Cloudy with a Chance of Meatballs 2	A post-credits scene shows Barb asking Steve on a date. Steve, who is distracted while trying to make himself some dinner, inadvertently agrees.
2013	Justice League: The Flashpoint Paradox	In a post-credits scene, a Boom Tube opens in space above Earth and a horde of Parademons emerges. (Note: The story continues in Justice League: War (2014).)
2013	Anchorman 2: The Legend Continues	The scene shows the news team getting up from a table at GNN as Ron Burgundy says, "Let's do it. You guys see the one?... I don't know how to use a computer. Hey, fellas? I just saw Jack Lime out there...." The shot cuts to Brick messily eating a chocolate chip cookie under the table. He looks at the camera, smiles, and waves.
2013	The Wolverine	Logan returns to the United States two years later and is approached at the airport by Charles Xavier and Erik Lehnsherr, who warn him of a grave threat to the mutant race.
2013	Oggy and the Cockroaches: The Movie	Dee Dee, Marky, and Joey are heard singing the Xilam jingle and laughing. Oggy hits them off-screen with a fly swatter and meows.
2013	Frozen	Marshmallow, who fell off the canyon in the middle of the movie, makes his way back to the top and returns to the ice palace, only to learn that no one is here, but he accidentally steps on the crown on the exact place where Elsa tosses away while singing the song "Let It Go". Marshmallow wears Elsa's Crown, making him the King of the Ice Palace.
2013	Scooby-Doo! Stage Fright	During the credits, the gang stops at a gas station where they see the news that Steve has become the new host of Talent Star after the show has been renewed for a tenth season. Velma advises Daphne to talk to Fred about their possible relationship as Shaggy and Scooby advise Fred to do the same. Then they head out to Goose Lake to solve the mystery of the Goose Lake Monster.
2013	Mickey Virus	Credits roll to show a few deleted scenes and bloopers and plays a call recording of Anwar Raja, who orders to kill Mickey.
2013	Evil Dead	An older Ash Williams utters his famous "Groovy" line before staring into the camera.
2013	Settai	As the credits roll, A collection of bloopers and outtakes, behind the scenes, during the credits and featuring R. Kannan.
2013	Curse of Chucky	The film's post-credits scene only appears in the unrated version. Chucky returns to his original archenemy, Andy Barclay, only to be shot in the head and tortured.
2013	Biriyani	A collection of outtakes and bloopers are shown during the credits.
2013	A Madea Christmas	A collection of outtakes and bloopers runs during the end credits.
2013	Raja Rani	In a mid-credits scene, John, Regina and Sarathy.; A collection of bloopers and during the credits.
2013	Endrendrum Punnagai	In a mid-credits scenes, a happy ending with Gautham and Priya getting engaged in front of a recovering Sridhar at the hospital.
2013	One Direction: This Is Us	There are multiple outtakes and extra scenes shown. There is also a performance of Best Song Ever.
2013	Alan Partridge: Alpha Papa	Alan cuts from one song to another, ripping on each previous song.
2013	Get a Horse!	The flap on Pete's pants open up to reveal the words "The End" on his butt and Pete screams "HEY!!" as the screen cuts to the credits.; After the credits, the castle is in black-and-white and Clarabelle jumps over it, making the arch with milk.
2013	Toy Story of Terror!	The rest of the toys laugh. Mr. Pricklepants states that laughter is a definite sign that the worst is over and the credits are about to roll.; During the end credits scene, Carl and his friends go home to their owner, Billy, while the police arrive to take Ron to jail. However, Ron flees, crashing into the motel's sign with the police cruiser before running out. The last line in the special is one of the cops saying that they've got a runner.
2013	Jackass Presents: Bad Grandpa	Behind the scenes and outtakes are shown throughout the credits.
2013	Desingu Raja	During the credits, "Pom Pom" is sung.
2013	The Art of the Steal	In a mid-credits scene, Interpol receives an anonymous tip as to the whereabouts of Nicky and the painting that he stole from the partner that he double crossed earlier.; In a post-credits scene, the ice vendor with the slow business makes another appearance
2013	Identity Thief	At the end of the credits, the gas station cashier says that Sandy is a girl's name, and Sandy says it is a unisex name.
2013	Saving Mr. Banks	There are many black-and-white pictures of the actual characters depicted in the movie, as well as pictures from the production of the Mary Poppins film. In the middle of the credits a reel-to-reel tape recorder is seen and heard playing back one of the actual taped work sessions between Mrs. Travers and the Disney staff.
2013	Dhoom 3	In a post-credits scene, "Dhoom Machale Dhoom" is sung.
2013	Vanakkam Chennai	In a post-credits scene, Anjali has returned to London and wins her photography contest. Deepak tells her that Narayanan had told him everything from scratch, and that Ajay is innocent. He convinces her that she loves Ajay and vice versa, as she did not hesitate to visit Theni or act as Ajay's wife despite being engaged to Deepak. Anjali returns to the Chennai house and looks for Ajay, but does not find him. Just then, Ajay opens the door and finds his passport that he was looking for. Anjali meets him and is initially upset, asking him why he did not come to her for the last three months in London. Ajay tells her that he had just received his passport and was planning to leave for the airport. As the two hug and reconcile, Narayanan, unaware of their presence, enters with a prospective tenant to trick, and takes an advance from him. Ajay and Anjali stop Narayanan and punch him.; Second, in a post-credits scene, "Chennai City Gangster" is sung and featuring Anirudh Ravichander, Hard Kaur and Robert.
2013	The Purge	There is radio news coverage of the aftermath of the purge.
2013	Justin Bieber's Believe	after all the credits have scrolled, which shows the same computer used at the beginning of the movie sending a video of a young Justin Bieber to friends before shutting off.
2013	Persona 3 The Movie: No. 1, Spring of Birth	The mysterious boy appears to Makoto and introduces himself as Pharos. Meanwhile, at an undisclosed location, a girl awakens from a slumber.
2013	The House of Magic	In a post-credits scene, Daniel is attempting to convince a new client to sell her house and move to a retirement home but soon learns that she has many, many cats and sneezes violently.
2013	Movie 43	A series of bloopers and outtakes from previous shorts (with the exception of "Beezel", which plays during the credits) (One from "The Thread" can only be found on certain releases).
2013	Attila Marcel	A post-credits scene revisits the scene in which Paul's aunts are dancing on the beach. One of them falls and drags the other down to her knees. The aunt on her knees shouts to their male companions, "Help us, damn it!" Red cursive writing appears in the lower right corner reading, "à Bernadette..." ("to Bernadette"). The aunts are helped to their feet and begin walking and singing again. Slight red tail leader flashes are seen as a flapping tail slap sound is heard before the screen goes black.
2014	Ride Along	James and Ben are at a backyard barbecue and they argue about who gets to light the gas grill. When Ben lights it, the thing explodes, hurling Ben into the neighbor's yard.
2014	Dead Snow 2: Red vs. Dead	In a post-credits scene, the Nazi doctor recovers Herzog's severed head, which opens its eyes.
2014	Justice League: War	In a post-credits scene, an Atlantean ship emerges from the ocean and Ocean Master appears carrying the dead body of his king. He believes that the surface dwellers on Earth are responsible, calling it an act of war from the surface, for which he swears revenge. (Note: Marking continuity to the 2015 film Justice League: Throne of Atlantis.)
2014	All Hail the King	What Justin Hammer is doing in prison is shown.
2014	Captain America: The Winter Soldier	Hydra's Wolfgang von Strucker and Dr. List see twins Wanda and Pietro Maximoff, who are held in custody, experimenting with their powers.; Bucky Barnes visits his own memorial at the Smithsonian Institution.
2014	Muppets Most Wanted	The credits start with fireworks that explode into the heads of various Muppets and objects from the movie. the first minute of rolling credits features Sweetums, Fozzie Bear, the Swedish Chef, and Dr. Bunsen Honeydew. The first three pull the credits up manually with an attached rope. Then Bunsen uses a contraption that automatically pulls the credits up, but when they scroll too quickly, he reverses it back to normal speed. Nearly three minutes later, Fozzie appears once again and says, "Check this out!" He hangs his hat on the LOS ANGELES UNIT text before exiting offscreen.; Fozzie says "You can go home now, Ma. Movie's over."
2014	Need for Speed	Benny leading a few other inmates in an exercise routine.
2014	A Million Ways to Die in the West	Jamie Foxx (in his Django outfit) shows up at the shooting gallery and shoots the guy running the contest. He turns around and says "Someone always dies at the fair."; Foxx slowly walks away asking for the white women.
2014	About Last Night	Bernie and Joan continue to exchange "dirty talk" at the restaurant.
2014	Shaadi Ke Side Effects	During the credits, a collection of outtakes is shown and "Tauba Main Vyaah Karke Pachhtaya" is sung.; In a post-credits scene, Trisha is shown talking to a driver.
2014	Moms' Night Out	The credits start with the cast dancing on the Dance Cam at the bowling alley.
2014	Earth to Echo	There's a shaky video of Alex waking up early in the morning with his phone going bonkers (indicating that Echo has returned).
2014	Velaiilla Pattadhari	In a mid-credits scene, brothers family camera clicking shutter is a flying hat camera shutting.
2014	X-Men: Days of Future Past	In Ancient Egypt, an Egyptian crowd is seen chanting to En Sabah Nur, who telekinetically elevates building blocks to build pyramids as four horsemen observe him from afar.
2014	Cooties	Mr. Hatachi in the school basement twirling a blade saying "... and the frog f**ked the caterpillar, ha!"
2014	What We Do in the Shadows	A post-credits scene shows Deacon attempting to hypnotize the audience to forget the events of the film.
2014	Guardians of the Galaxy	Baby Groot dances to "I Want You Back" by the Jackson Five, but only when Drax is not looking.; The Collector sits in his destroyed archive with two of his living exhibits: Cosmo the Spacedog and Howard the Duck.
2014	Veeram	In a mid-credits scene, who is impressed with Vinayagam's valour gets Vinayagam and Koppu married. Thus, Vinayagam and his brothers get married with great pomp.
2014	Son of Batman	During the credits, the fight between Damian Wayne and Nightwing is shown.
2014	Small Time	A string of Diamond Motors commercials play during the start of the credits.
2014	Neighbors	Baby Stella's calendar shoot and she's dressed as each of the main characters whose names are on the screen.; There are the Hebrew characters for "game over" while hearing Jimmy pronounce them.
2014	Top Five	Jerry Seinfeld says his top five list.
2014	American Sniper	Various photos and videos of Chris Kyle's funeral procession are shown.
2014	Mr. Peabody & Sherman	Mr. Peabody and Sherman appear in their original hand-drawn 2-D animated designs from The Adventures of Rocky and Bullwinkle and Friends then they wave goodbye to the audience and walk off into the distinct.
2014	Singham Returns	In a post-credits scene, "Aata Majhi Satakli" is sung and featuring Yo Yo Honey Singh.
2014	Rocky and Bullwinkle	Fearless Leader asks his mother if she saw his missing bowling ball and asks him if he looked in his killer robot.
2014	The Nut Job	During the end credits all the characters, plus an animated Psy, Before the credits, Psy leading the animals and people in the Gangnam Style dance.; In a mid-credits scene, Raccoon and Cardinal are revealed to still be alive and are plotting revenge, while stuck on a buoy in the ocean, surrounded by hungry sharks circling them.; In a post-credits scene, Mole trying to run from Precious while carrying a bone. They run off-screen then reappear running the other way with the bone is Precious' mouth and the Mole following with the dog whistle.
2014	Think Like a Man Too	Cedric drop a dollar bill while heading to check out of the hotel. Bennett picks it up and tries to return it, but Cedric shoves it back to Bennett. Bennett then puts the dollar into a Steve Harvey slot machine and wins $100,000. Cedric runs up and tries to claim the money and a fight ensues.; There is an outtake with Cedric constantly asking Declan if he has yet left the room.
2014	Kick	In a mid-credits scene, Devi then thanks Himanshu, saying that he was never against him, but he is against the corrupt system.; In a second mid-credits scene, "Yaar Naa Miley" is sung.
2014	Race Gurram	In a post-credits scene, He reveals that the public was planning to re-elect the same government in the next elections. Lucky uses this opportunity and blackmails the CM and Govardhan to continue this special-force team and give police officers like his brother full powers. They let Siva Reddy go, but he is shot to death by Rajeev, who earlier had to kill ACP Sameer. Lucky and Ram reunite with their family and friends.
2014	St. Vincent	Vincent wearing his old Walkman, singing along to the Bob Dylan song "Shelter From the Storm". He starts next to his house, sneaking a cigarette hidden under a potted plant, then wanders over to his lawn chair where he uses a hose to water his non-existent lawn and ends up watering his socks and sandals instead.
2014	Chef	We see Carl's father-in-law's Cuban band playing at Carl and Inez's reception party in Carl's new restaurant. Later, the real food truck scene in L.A. is seen. Towards the end of the credits, Jon Favreau learns how to make an excellent grilled cheese sandwich from a real chef.
2014	Oru Kanniyum Moonu Kalavaanikalum	During the credits, "Bachelor Enakke" is sung and montages of images.
2014	22 Jump Street	Setups, posters, and teases for possible upcoming Jump Street movies.; Mr. Walters and Eric snuggling in their prison bunk. Mr. Walters tells Eric that "he's late."
2014	Penguins of Madagascar	The penguins use the ray-machine to change Private back to normal with help from Mort and Julien.
2014	The Monuments Men	We see pictures of the actual Monuments Men recovering artwork.
2014	Nimirndhu Nil	The end credits showcase that Aravindan and his team become successful in their problems fight against corruption.
2014	Party Central	In a post-credits scene, the husband and wife wake their son Timmy up and ask if they can sleep with him, saying that there are monsters in their closet. Timmy shouts, "That's what I've been trying to tell you!"
2014	Let's Be Cops	Ryan and Justin screwing around while pretending to be cops.
2014	Million Dollar Arm	At the start of the credits, a child in India practices pitching a baseball at a scarecrow. During the rest of the credits, there are videos and pictures of the real Rinku, Dinesh, and Amit, including scenes of Rinku and Dinesh at the actual Million Dollar Arm contest. Rinku and Dinesh are also shown as members of the Pirates organization.
2014	Dumb and Dumber To	We see Lloyd and Harry riding on the Zamboni down a major highway. It seems as if they have stopped off at a fast-food restaurant and picked up malts in the drive-through. Lloyd ordered a chocolate malt and Harry, a vanilla malt. However, they were disappointed they were given the wrong Malts, Lloyd had been given a vanilla and Harry a chocolate. Disgusted by this turn of events you see them throw both malts over their shoulders only to land on the windshield of the 18-wheeler that Lloyd was kissing earlier in the movie. You see the driver get fuming mad and floor the throttle of his truck to ram the guys, only for the scene to cut away and see a heading for "Dumb and Dumber For" coming in 2034. Rob Riggle is again shown as the special ops man, disguised as part of the Dumb and Dumber For sign, steps out and then walks off the screen.
2014	Tammy	Missi leaving Greg for the manager at Topper Jack's (the guy who fired Tammy).; Tammy sitting in a hot tub relaxing with the two Topper Jack's employees she robbed.
2014	Planes: Fire & Rescue	The former superintendent of Piston Peak National Park Cad Spinner is shown now demoted and reassigned to his new job as greeter at the Death Valley National Park.; The smokejumpers crew comes out and push away the last line of the credits.
2014	The Smell of Us	Various home videos of the characters are shown throughout the closing credits.
2014	The Homesman	The credits start over the last scene, with George dancing on the ferry crossing the river.
2014	The Inbetweeners 2	In a montage over the credits, the four travel from Australia to Vietnam, and then spend time in Thailand and Cambodia and are seen shooting machine guns and partying with ladyboys. Upon their return to the United Kingdom several months later, Simon, Will and Neil have considerably longer hair, while Jay has his hair in braids. Neil is in a relationship with an older female traveller from the Byron Bay hostel, while Will's mother announces her engagement to Mr Gilbert, much to Will's horror. He tries to run back to the plane, being tackled by airport police in the process.
2014	Search Party	Berk literally crashes a party at Narduzzi's new store.; There is an outtake where Hugo shaves Marty in preparation for kidney removal.
2014	When the Game Stands Tall	Videos of the actual coaches and players, along with a testimonial from John Madden.
2014	Rage	The police and Detective Peter St. John investigating the crime scene in the house and then rolling out a body bag. Vanessa then sees all of this and cries.
2014	Teenage Mutant Ninja Turtles	Michelangelo and Raphael jumping through New York and hide in a Victoria's Secret billboard.
2014	Zapped	There is a collection of outtakes and during the credits.; In a post-credits scene, two students who were in detention discovered Zoey's phone and it zapped, hinting at a sequel.
2014	Dawn of the Planet of the Apes	We hear what sounds like an ape gasping for air and rubble shifting.
2014	My Little Pony: Equestria Girls – Rainbow Rocks	During the credits, Sunset is seen having now been accepted by the rest of the school.; In a post-credits scene, the human world's version of Twilight is shown investigating the strange magical activity around Canterlot High.
2014	Alexander and the Terrible, Horrible, No Good, Very Bad Day	Before the credits, Ben and Kelly receive good news: he was hired for the game design job, and she has been informed that the reading went viral and has created publicity for the book. Reunited, Ben brings out the cake, with Alexander wishing for more days like the one they shared together.
2014	Naaigal Jaakirathai	In a post-credits scene, where Karthik and his new dog, who has been named Chinnamani in Subramani's memory, are being entrusted with investigating a new case.; In a second post-credits scene, "Doggy Style" is sung.
2014	Swearnet: The Movie	The mid-credits scene takes place within the fictional Trailer Park Boys universe, in which Wells, Smith, and Tremblay are still the owners of Swearnet, but Ricky, Bubbles and Julian are separate people. The scene — which occurs sometime after Swearnet Live — depicts the six of them meeting in the Swearnet headquarters, and the Trailer Park Boys being offered a contract to continue being filmed. However, Ricky signs the contract without fulling understanding it; he, Bubbles, and Julian had thought that they would be hosting Swearnet, rather than resuming Trailer Park Boys. Additionally, Ricky insists that they be paid nine thousand dollars, even though Swearnet had been prepared to offer them ninety. When the boys exit the Swearnet building, they see the new camera crew. Ricky attacks them in anger, before they all leave.
2014	Bang Bang!	In a mid-credits scene, after an unknown period on the run, Jai is eventually reunited with Pankaj and Shikha, as he finally introduces Harleen to them.; During the credits, a song is sung.
2014	Blended	Outtakes of the cast dancing with the African dance troupe. Afterwards there is a cute Adam Sandler song that was apparently recorded with his real children.
2014	Anjaan	In a mid-credits scene, Before leaving Mumbai, Raju and Jeeva meet Raja, who is shocked to learn it was Raju all along.
2014	The Boxtrolls	Mr. Trout and Mr. Pickles having a philosophical conversation about a higher power, "them controlling us". The camera slowly pulls back and the animator is shown manipulating the two mechanical dolls that make up the stop-motion camera work.
2014	Annie	Annie announces the opening of the "Stacks Literacy Center," to teach children to read. Everyone sings Annie's "Tomorrow" as the credits roll, and Stacks adopts Annie's four friends as well as Sandy.; A collection of outtakes and bloopers runs during the end credits.; There is a brief scene after the credits.; As the credits end, there is a faint groan.
2014	Maria Leonora Teresa	In a mid-credits scene, while a parent is grieving in front of a grave of a child who died on a field trip, Dr. Manolo Apacible gives her a box containing a doll.
2014	Veronica Mars	James Franco in his trailer trying to come up with words that rhyme with "orange". Later, Logan's answering machine greeting is heard.
2014	Saivam	In a mid-credits scene and as the credits roll, everyone realises the truth and turn vegetarian indicating that they wouldn't harm any species.
2014	The Hero of Color City	Yellow explains how crayons are recycled. This was used for a PSA for Crayon Collection.; White is shown relaxing in the spa, saying that he finally made it.
2014	Song of the Sea	In a mid-credits scene, the family is shown happily painting a mural of their home, Bronagh, and the Faeries and celebrating Ben's birthday, and Ben and Saoirse, now closer than ever, go swimming with Cú and the seals in the ocean.
2014	Corner Gas: The Movie	The names of the 2,500+ people who donated to the movie's Kickstarter campaign are listed in the closing credits.
2014	The Last: Naruto The Movie	The credits show a montage of Naruto and Hinata's wedding, with many of their friends and family attending and congratulating them.; In a post-credits scene, Naruto and Hinata are happily married and living together with their two children; their son Boruto, and their daughter Himawari.
2014	Black or White	Some various clips of Eloise sharing happy moments with her family.
2014	The Pirate Fairy	During the post-credit scenes, James finally evades the crocodile but is stranded in the ocean until he is rescued by Mr. Smee, who compliments the hook in his possession.
2014	Mostly Ghostly: Have You Met My Ghoulfriend?	A collection of bloopers and outtakes plays during the end credits.
2014	Poojai	In a mid-credits scene, Vasu returns home to mourn Rajalakshmi's death with his family.
2014	Aranmanai	In a mid-credits scene, when they all pose for a photograph in front of the palace, a zoomed-in shot shows a ghostly figure moving near a palace window, implying that Selvi has returned to the palace.
2014	Oka Laila Kosam	Nandana meanwhile receives the book Oka Laila Kosam from Shahrukh who credits its writer as the owner of the pigeons she has. She reads the book which is her story and learns Karthik' sincerity from the words in the book. She meets Karthik and proposes to him before their respective families and they both unite.
2014	Big Hero 6	Fred touches a portrait of his family and a secret door opens. Fred enters the room and discovers that his father is a ex-superhero. His father, voiced by Stan Lee, walks in.
2014	Dr. Cabbie	During the credits, Deepak and Tony is a Taxi her Toronto and Collection bloopers and outtakes.
2014	Night at the Museum: Secret of the Tomb	More of the characters dancing in the museum.
2014	Into the Woods	We see a quick glimpse of Cinderella as she says, "I wish..."
2014	Meaghamann	During the credits, Arul rejects Usha's proposal and asks her to focus on her life.; In a post-credits scene, He then moves on to his next mission and kills Sharma and seizes the remaining 900 kg of heroin.
2014	Happy New Year	During the credits, a "Worst Dance Competition" is hosted.
2014	PK	In a post-credits scene, PK returns to Earth on a new research mission on human nature with more members of his species.
2014	Vellaikaara Durai	In a mid-credits scene, the bomb explodes and Pandi is launched up like a rocket.
2014	Yo-kai Watch: The Movie	In a mid-credits scene, "Yo-Kai Medley" is sung.
2014	The Grand Budapest Hotel	Near the end of the credits, a small, animated Russian man dances to the speed balalaika.
2014	Persona 3 The Movie: No. 2, Midsummer Knight's Dream	Ryoji Mochizuki is seen standing at the Moonlight Bridge.
2014	The Interview	After the credits roll, a short "In Memoriam" segment starts playing, in dedication to Digby the beagle.
2015	Sleeping With Other People	A funny conversation between Xander and his wife while they wait for Jake and Lainey.
2015	Darling	In a mid-credits scene, Kathir and Nisha hugging in the kitchen. The glass door shows Shruthi's and Shiva's reflection, showing that their ghosts are still inside the house.
2015	I	In a mid-credits scenes, Lingesan undergoes stem cell treatment, blood transfusion, yoga and physiotherapy for his condition and gradually returns to normal.
2015	Shaun the Sheep Movie	The Farmer sees a news report detailing some of the mayhem he slept through during his rescue from the city, much to his and the animals' shock.; The rooster who had been holding the sign at the beginning of the film carries a sign that says "The End" and then turns it and it says "Go Home." The rooster then leaves the room. One of the flock then enters the room with a vacuum cleaner, and begins to clean.
2015	What We Do in the Shadows	Scenes during the credits reveal that Vladislav has gotten back together with Pauline and Jackie has made her husband her new familiar.; A post-credits scene shows Deacon attempting to hypnotize the audience to forget the events of the film.
2015	The SpongeBob Movie: Sponge Out of Water	The characters dance and march across the screen to a song, "Squeeze Me" by N.E.R.D. before the credits roll.; Gary pursues Plankton and snarls at him.
2015	Nannbenda	In a post-credits scene, Sathya, Sivakolundhu, Ramya and Preethi.
2015	Mortdecai	The sound of Mortdecai giving a short laugh can be heard
2015	Justice League: Throne of Atlantis	Lex Luthor visits incarcerated Orm in his cell at Belle Reve.
2015	Dongaata	In a post-credits scene, it is shown that Kattam Raju and Vijju managed to fake his room keys and floor level and installed remote CCTV so as to know his locker passcode and opened and stole it while Venkat was talking to Shruthi. After that, the three people bid a goodbye to him.
2015	American Ultra	We see the conclusion of the Manila mission in cartoon form, with Mike depicted by his cartoon ape.
2015	The Martian	Five years later, as the Ares V is launching, those involved in Watney's rescue are seen in their current lives watching the launch footage.
2015	Anegan	In a mid-credits scene, As they playfully argue over whether Madhu's dreams had all been hallucinations or partly true, they pass by a log with a heart and the names of Munaruna and Samudra carved into it.
2015	Teen Beach 2	During the credits, the crowd dances to the movie's opening number, and as Lela seems to wink towards Mack, who notices but is oblivious to it, Brady and Mack introduce themselves to each other and fall in love again ("That's How We Do").
2015	Bombay Velvet	Before the end credits, it is revealed that Rosie survived being shot.
2015	Aloha	The background during the credits is the night sky with satellites crossing back and forth.; Bradley Cooper dedicates the gravesite for the bones of Dennis "Bumpy" Kanahele that were discovered during the building of the new walkway.; Later on in the credits, a broken part of the satellite floats across the screen.
2015	Scouts Guide to the Zombie Apocalypse	The selfies that Carter took during the apocalypse are displayed.; Scout Leader Rogers' head is in the parking lot and gets crapped on by a bird. Then the head looks up and says "The End."
2015	Avengers: Age of Ultron	Frustrated with his minions' lack of progress in collecting the Infinity Stones, Thanos vows to get the rest himself.
2015	Monster High: Haunted	In a post-credits scene, the monitors sneak into the Boogeyman's mansion and play with the sands by turning into solids. Even after Twyla finds them and is shocked but accepts them before going to bed to sleep, the monitors continue to party.
2015	Tomorrowland	At the end of the credits, a "T" pin scrolls upward. A hand reaches in and grabs it, then both vanish in a flash.
2015	Pixies	In several credits scenes, Joe's journey becomes not just a quest to break the curse and reclaim his love, but a path toward personal growth and understanding of the delicate balance between the magical and human worlds.; in a post-credits scene, proving that he has truly learned from his mistakes and is worthy of breaking the Pixie's Curse that has torn apart his life.
2015	Ant-Man	Hank Pym shows his daughter Hope van Dyne a prototype Wasp outfit.; In a cut-down scene from Captain America: Civil War, Steve Rogers and Sam Wilson discuss what to do about Bucky Barnes. Wilson says he knows "a guy" who can help him.
2015	Ivan Maryadaraman	In the end credits, Narasimhan's mother persuades him and his son to promise that they will never harm or kill anyone or even touch any harmful weapons. Raman and Krishna are seen going together on a bicycle.
2015	Yennai Arindhaal	In a mid-credits scene, Thenmozhi of the pending coffee that Thenmozhi wanted to have with Sathya, indicating that he is ready to move on with Thenmozhi.
2015	Dragon Ball Z: Resurrection 'F'	Frieza is back in heaven tied up like cocoon and cuddly teddy bears and fairies dance and sing around him. Frieza exclaims "Nooooo!" and the Cuddly teddy bears and fairies say "Yesssss!"
2015	Capture the Flag	In mid-credits, Carson is revealed to have survived the explosion, floating on the space, and his minion Gigs is revealed to be a robot that was created by Gags, who was accidentally killed by Carson earlier, and they both are stuck with the annoying robot with using a Helium-3 battery.
2015	Janda Pai Kapiraju	The end credits explain that Aravind and his team succeed in their fight against corruption.
2015	Vacation	Some embarrassing vacation pics featuring the Griswolds and some of the people they met on their trip.
2015	Jem and the Holograms	Erica recruiting The Misfits to destroy Jem and the Holograms.
2015	The Wedding Ringer	Doug and Jimmy are tennis doubles team. After Doug inadvertently throws his racket into Jimmy's back during a service, Jimmy retaliates by throwing his own racket straight into Doug's face, knocking Doug out. Jimmy looks around and flees. The scene lasts about 15 seconds.
2015	Un gallo con muchos huevos	In the mid-credits, Tlacua and Cuache are seen trying to stop a motorcycle with a rope, attempting to capture a chicken. They are launched as a group of motorcycle gangs drive by.; In the post-credits, as Toto thanks Patín Patán for the help, Patín's father appears, revealing he managed to escape the crocodile. The two then go off, talking about their journeys.
2015	Love the Coopers	Santa walking down the middle of the darkened, snowy street.; There is a jam session of the actors playing and singing various Christmas songs in the living room.
2015	Hitman: Agent 47	We see the electrocuted John Smith, his hair turned completely white, return to life.
2015	An American Girl: Grace Stirs Up Success	During the credits, The community, having watched Grace on Masterchef Junior, comes to support the bakery, with Bernard giving business a boost for the celebration.
2015	Straight Outta Compton	The music video for Straight Outta Compton plays, interspersed with news clips on N.W.A. and its members.
2015	Sakalakala Vallavan	In a post-credits scene, Divya and Shakthi happily live together while they argue over little things, making their life filled with love, and with a lesson from Chinnasamy saying that couples' fights are for fun, and no one else should get involved in them.
2015	Ted 2	A beaten-up Liam Neeson staggers into a grocery store to return a box of Trix cereal.
2015	Tamasha	In a mid-credits scene, in a secret scene, there is a flashback from Ranbir and Deepika's time in Corsica. Both of the leads are dancing on their own beat – they have headphones on – in the middle of a scenic landscape. Ranbir leans in close to Deepika, removes her headphone slightly, and says: "Mujhe yakeen ho gaya hai ki Teja ka sona tere paas hai!" Deepika smiles. Both continue to dance away – but still close – from each other to their own music. "Matargashti" starts playing. The scene could also be a hint that the two took another trip to Corsica.
2015	Smosh: The Movie	In a post-credits scene, Ian marries Brad with Anthony crying in the background.
2015	Entourage	In a mid-credits scene, Ari's former assistant Lloyd has his wedding and Ari gives him away. When the group gets together for a picture, Billy Walsh suggests that they should make a film (or TV show) about the lives of Vince and the gang.
2015	O Kadhal Kanmani	In the post-credits, it is shown that Adi has finished his project in the US and has moved to Paris, where they reunite and have a child.
2015	Terminator Genisys	In the ruins of Cyberdyne Systems, the camera moves through a crack in the remaining structure to reveal the Skynet hologram looking at a working plasma containment field.
2015	Accidental Love	The wedding dancing continues for a little while. The screen expands back to full. Alice announces that she would like to give a toast, and it appears that she is going to propose to Howard. Keshawn then uncorks a bottle of champagne and hits her in the eye. Keshawn belatedly says "heads up!" A few bloopers are shown. The dancing then continues, with Alice now sporting a bandage over her eye and holding an ice pack to it.
2015	Spy	Various future mission briefs for Susan Cooper are shown including a mission to save Rick Ford. Each of these has example equipment (e.g. a flamethrower concealed inside a lipstick).; There is an outtake of the final scene in the movie between Rick Ford and Susan Cooper where Melissa McCarthy makes a joke about Rick using his thumb during a sex-act that causes Jason Statham to break character by laughing and talking to the crew.
2015	Poltergeist	Carrigan Burke recording the introduction to one of his shows. His ex-wife Brooke enters the scene at the wrong time and a small argument breaks out.
2015	The Little Prince	In a mid-credits scene, the Little Girl draws a picture of a boa constrictor that has eaten an elephant on the chalkboard and explains to her class that it is not a hat.
2015	Aambala	In the first post-credits scene, The family reunites and celebrates the three brothers' weddings with their cousins; In the second post-credits scene, "Inbam Pongum Venilla" is sung featuring Hiphop Tamizha.
2015	Pitch Perfect 2	As the credits roll, Bumper appears on The Voice and all of the judges turn around. He picks Christina Aguilera to be his coach.
2015	Unfinished Business	Dan reading his daughter's homework assignment on what a dad is.
2015	Entourage	It features Lloyd's wedding and features much of the principal cast and recurring characters from the series, along with some surprises.
2015	Dope	The credits are designed to look like the old Pop Up Video show, with video of Malcolm dancing to old hip hop songs.
2015	Massu Engira Masilamani	In the mid-credits scene, Masss, now a reformed man in a respectable position, has married Malini and has a young son, Shakthi (named after his grandfather), who can see and converse with ghosts, while Jettu remains on Earth with Masss and his family, accompanying Shakthi at all times.; A collection of outtakes and bloopers runs during the end credits.; Jet Li, M A S S S, Masss.
2015	Minions	There are miscellaneous skits with the Minions and Gru.; Kevin, Stuart and Bob are singing The Beatles song "Revolution" and playing instruments, then it breaks out into a full on production with all-characters from the movie. But then they all run away in fright except Gru when they hear the T-Rex from the beginning of the film roaring. Gru tries to freeze the T-Rex with his freeze ray but it breaks down.
2015	Baahubali: The Beginning	In a post-credits scene, A dejected Kattappa explains that Amahendra Baahubali was killed by a traitor, and reveals himself to be that traitor.
2015	Monster High: Boo York, Boo York	In a post-credits scene, Astranova, who now attends Monster High, starts a music battle with her guitar against Operetta and her banjo during Mr. Rotter's class. After class, Astranova calls Ever After High's Raven Queen and Apple White, telling them that Monster High actually exists.
2015	My Little Pony: Equestria Girls – Friendship Games	Twilight Sparkle arrives in the human world after not responding to Sunset Shimmer's messages until now, and meets her human world counterpart.
2015	Rock the Kasbah	Richie Lanz haggles with a street vendor while buying a toy elephant and some string for his daughter.
2015	Kingsman: The Secret Service	Eggsy returns to the pub and, in a scene paralleling the earlier pub scene with Galahad, faces down his mother's abusive boyfriend.
2015	The Peanuts Movie	In the first mid-credits scene, Lucy tries to convince Charlie Brown to kick the football once more. Charlie is apprehensive, but Lucy tells him that she now understands that he is kind, compassionate, brave, and funny and that no one would pull a football away from someone with all of those qualities. Charlie, convinced, agrees once more, only for Lucy to pull the football away and adds smugly that she forgot to say that he is gullible, causing Charlie to smile.; In the second mid-credits scene, Snoopy, Fifi, Woodstock, the Beagle Scouts, and Snoopy's siblings celebrate Snoopy's victory over the Red Baron with root beer, that is until the Red Baron shows up again and knocks Snoopy into the root beer causing him to angrily scream "Curse you, Red Baron!" (via thought bubble).; In the post-credits scene, Linus' model tri-plane finally sputters to a stop over the water and falls straight in.
2015	Experimenter	In a mid-credits scene, more archival footage is shown.
2015	Blinky Bill the Movie	In the post-credits scene, Cranklepot swings a bilby but he tries to escape but Jorge tells him 'the kid said higher', and the bilbies, birds and joeys say 'my turn', and Cranklepot groans.
2015	Hot Tub Time Machine 2	Nick, Lou, Jacob, and Adam Jr., are messing around in the hot tub and going to various times and altering or exploiting historic events and famous people.
2015	Yatchan	In a mid-credits scene, with the two of them going back to their own ways and with Karthik having a conversation with director Vishnuvardhan about another film.
2015	Vasuvum Saravananum Onna Padichavanga	In a post-credits scenes, This turns out to be successful. They are also supported by Akila Chechi, the leader of Akila Indian Men Security Club. Then, Assistant Commissioner Vetrivel arrives and tells the trio to join up with their wives by lying that they have their friendship cut.
2015	We Are Your Friends	In the mid-credits scene, Tanya opens her front door to an Adidas shoebox that Cole has been saving his earnings in throughout the film.
2015	Naanum Rowdy Dhaan	In a post-credits scenes, Pandi falsely takes credit for their deaths in order to impress Kadhambari. Ultimately, Pandi, disillusioned with the thug lifestyle, becomes a police officer, as per his mother's wishes.
2015	Saving Mr. Wu	Footage of the actual rescue of Wu and Duo is shown during the credits.
2015	The Green Inferno	First there is the sound of static and then it cuts to a satellite map of the jungle. Then there is a phone conversation with Alejandro's sister calling Justine telling her that they found a photo from the satellite of the village. During the conversation it's slow zooming in to an aerial view of the village and finally focuses on what is Alejandro looking up still alive and her telling Justine "We need to talk".; Later in the credits there is a listing of films in the Italian cannibal genre that includes titles such as the infamous Cannibal Holocaust.
2015	Pasanga 2	During the credits, it shows paper boats showing celebrities having attention deficit hyperactivity disorder, along with their bio.
2015	Cinderella	Near the end of the credits, the Fairy Godmother (Helena Bonham Carter) finishes singing "Bibbidi-Bobbidi-Boo", and after a few seconds she asks "Where did everyone go?".
2015	Goosebumps	About midway through the credits the gnomes chuckle and again at the end of the credits.
2015	Inside Out	The interiors of the heads of a clown, cat, dog, teacher, school bus driver and one of the cool kids at Riley's school are shown.
2015	Riley's First Date?	After the credits, things inside Riley's mother's head are shown: she enjoys the kiss to the music of Berlin's "Take My Breath Away". After a moment, she ends the kiss, and Riley's father goes to fix the table he knocked over.
2015	Pixels	The entire movie is played back in 8-bit graphics style animation while the credits appear set in an old computer font.
2015	Puli	In a mid-credits scene, In gratitude for releasing her from the evil magical influence, Yavanarani makes Marudheeran heir to the throne of Vedhalapuram.
2015	Frozen Fever	In a post-credits scene, Olaf, Kristoff, and Sven escort the Snowgies to Elsa's former ice palace, where they stay with the palace's snow-giant doorkeeper and current owner Marshmallow.
2015	Don Verdean	Verdean and Boaz end up in prison together and talk in the yard. Verdean notices a young man sitting alone at a table during dinner and asks if he has a mother named Carol, to which he replies "Yes". Verdean pats him on the shoulder before it cuts to the credits.
2015	Charlie	As the credits roll, they are seen wandering together towards a new journey in life.
2015	Yo-kai Watch: Enma Daiō to Itsutsu no Monogatari da Nyan!	During the credits, Yuto is seen playing soccer with his friends with a drawing of Fuu 2 he did, Amy joyfully designs her own clothes with a picture of her and Rudy kept as a memory, Komasaburo is reunited with his real parents, Takayuki's mother has recovered from the hospital and Lord Enma and Zazel rewrites the peace treaty for the laws of the Yo-kai World.; In the post-credits scene, Whisper hopes that the viewers will be able to see the next movie, which shows a teaser of a CGI Jibanyan in a live-action world.
2015	Heneral Luna	General Gregorio del Pilar prepares to cover Aguinaldo's retreat to the north. He inspects Luna's remaining men and orders his aide, Colonel Vicente Enríquez, to select 60 of them for the coming battle.
2015	The Man from U.N.C.L.E.	The dossiers of Waverly, Solo, Kuryakin and Teller are shown.
2015	Detective Chinatown	During the credits, Qin and Tang are invited to an Intel centre where they are called to solve a new case in New York in "Back to Chinatown" is sung.
2016	From Vegas to Macau III	A collection of behind-the-scenes footage is shown throughout the end credits.
2016	Deadpool	In a parody of the post-credits scene in Ferris Bueller's Day Off, Deadpool instructs the audience to go home, then reveals that Cable will be featured in the sequel.
2016	Justice League vs. Teen Titans	In a mid-credits scene, a mysterious costumed girl (Note: Identified offscreen as Terra, marking continuity to Teen Titans: The Judas Contract.) riding a flying chunk of rock is seen heading towards the Titans Tower.
2016	Captain America: Civil War	T'Challa puts Bucky Barnes back into cryostasis in Wakanda until a cure for his mental programming can be found.; Peter Parker looks at web shooters given to him by Tony Stark. The web-shooters emit a spider-signal.
2016	Adventures in Babysitting	Lola sends the pictures to Katy, Emily, AJ, Bobby, Trey, Jenny and accidentally Helen.
2016	The Angry Birds Movie	The various birds and pigs dance to the song "I Will Survive".; The Blues launch themselves off the slingshot.
2016	Ice Age: Collision Course	Scrat getting smacked around by the automatic doors in the spaceship.
2016	Big Fish & Begonia	In a mid-credits scene, the Soul Keeper restores Qiu to life from his ashes and declares Qiu her successor, revealing the true cost of Qiu's sacrifice for Chun.
2016	Kevin Hart: What Now?	Kevin Hart and Halle Berry escape from the stadium while being pursued by David Meunier's men. As they fly away in a helicopter, Kevin says it's time the world learns how funny Kevin Hart is.
2016	Ratchet & Clank	The injured Doctor Nefarious is found by his robots and converted into his mechanical form from the video game series.; The Plumber appears and informs the audience that there is no bonus scene after the credits, asking them to leave.
2016	Maheshinte Prathikaaram	Later in the credits it shows that Mahesh and Jimsy are together now.
2016	Lion	Guddu is riding on top of the coal train as it emerges from a tunnel is shown again followed by the dedication "In loving memory of Guddu"
2016	X-Men: Apocalypse	Men in black suits visit the Weapon X facility to retrieve an X-ray and a blood sample from Weapon X, on behalf of the Essex Corporation.
2016	Zootopia	A live concert performance of Gazelle singing "Try Everything" is shown, with the major credits appearing on the video screen behind her. Many of the film's various major and minor characters appear in this sequence, including Bellwether watching the event on TV from her prison cell.
2016	Miruthan	In a post-credits scene, the story can be continued in a sequel to this film.
2016	Velainu Vandhutta Vellaikaaran	in a mid-credits scene, Parallelly, the bad guys have turned into ghosts and have joined the ghost gang ruled by Mottai Guru.
2016	Finding Dory	The credits scene is a mini-prequel featuring clips of Hank set before the events of the film's main plot.; In a post-credits scene, the Tank Gang (from Finding Nemo), is still trapped inside their plastic bags, reach California one year after floating across the Pacific Ocean, where they are picked up by staff members from the Marine Life Institute.
2016	Premam	In a post-credits scene, it is shown that the reason for Vicky's restaurant's name being S-Star is that an astrologer had predicted his future wife would have a name starting from S. Vicky recalls his life in the last 16 years, recalling that each of the girls he loved had a name starting from S.
2016	Aranmanai 2	During the credits, "Party with the Pei" is sung.; In a post-credits scene, Maya and Anitha scared.
2016	Keanu	The Allentown Brothers sit up, get in their car, and drive away.
2016	Kubo and the Two Strings	There's a time-lapse video that shows how the Laika, LLC crew animated the Gashadokuro.
2016	Bad Moms	Interviews are shown with the stars of the film alongside their mothers.
2016	Kallattam	Mahendran's daughter is seen dancing and Thamizh lifts her up in his arms.
2016	Jackson Durai	in a post-credits scene, Father, Viji, Sub-Inspector Sathya and Bradlee in "Jackson Durai" is sung.
2016	24	In a mid-credits scene, with a young Mani talking to a young Sathya.
2016	Miss Sloane	Elizabeth Sloane being released from a federal correctional facility.
2016	Kaththi Sandai	The credits revealed that Divya, Tamizhselvan, and Arjun are all actively involved in Manimangalam's development.
2016	League of Gods	In a mid-credits scene, with a baby Jiang Ziya in their possession.
2016	Central Intelligence	Dwayne Johnson yells out, "fanny".
2016	Alice Through the Looking Glass	At the end of the credits, the March Hare's voice can be heard saying, "Time to Go!"
2016	Why Him?	Gustav is telling everyone what happened to Laird Mayhew and the Fleming family after Christmas on FaceTime. The call ends with Laird attacking Gustav.
2016	Kotigobba 2	In the mid-credits scene, Sathya and Subha get married. However, Sathya continues his masquerade as Shiva to rob unaccounted stocks from corrupt businessmen, without Subha's knowledge.
2016	Rajinimurugan	In a post-credits scene, Ayyankalai reveals that he does have a grandson through his first wife's son. The grandson is revealed to be none other than Bosepandi from Varuthapadatha Valibar Sangam. Bosepandi refuses to accept his share of his grandfather's property, advising him and his family not to sell the property and instead convert it into a 5-star hotel and hand it over to Rajini Murugan. Ayyankalai and Rajini Murugan agree with him.
2016	Suicide Squad	In a mid-credits scene, Amanda Waller meets with Bruce Wayne, who agrees to protect her from the legal consequences of the events in Midway City in exchange for government files on the growing metahuman community. He reveals his plans to contact the heroes in the file, including Flash and Aquaman, to build his own superhero team. (Note: As depicted in Justice League (2017) and its 2021 director's cut) (Note: The team is identified off-screen as the Justice League.) She advises him to stop working late nights, implying she knows Bruce is Batman. In response, he tells Waller to shut down Task Force X or he and his "friends" will do it for her.
2016	Dirty Grandpa	It takes place approximately a year later during the baptism of Dick and Lenore's baby. There is then the announcement that Jason and Shadia are the godparents followed by everyone discussing how it's weird for a 72-year-old to be a new dad and how Lenore is now Jason's grandmother.
2016	Pink	The end credits scene reveals what actually happened: the men systematically isolated the women and Rajveer tried to force himself on Minal, who then attacked him with a bottle to his head in self defense.
2016	Ghostbusters	There's a scene that happens during the first few end credits, that features an appearance by Sigourney Weaver.; As the credits roll, Kevin is seen dancing and the crowd following his actions. The credits move left to right and change color in reaction to his dancing. Slimer appears at some points and moves.; Slimer moves the first half of the crawling credits from left to right at some points, mainly during Kevin's dancing.; Patty is listening to an audio recording and then asking the team "Do you know Zuul?"
2016	Odd Squad: The Movie	In a series of mid-credits scenes, Oscar shows Oona secret features of the headquarters science lab, finishing with a button that ends the movie.
2016	A.R.C.H.I.E.	The scene begins with Veronica and an unnamed businessman in a high-tech lab illuminated by cold, blue light. They are discussing the "stolen data" from Archie, which Veronica confirms has been successfully integrated into a new subject. A man (presumably a mercenary or data thief) enters and receives a briefcase full of money for his role in retrieving the data. Veronica's partner dismisses him coldly, telling him to "Shut up and get out." The camera pans to a new dog-not Archie, but a similar-looking stray. This dog is hooked up to various wires and sensors, much like Archie was at the beginning of the film.; As the screen fades, the dog's eyes suddenly glow bright red, accompanied by a mechanical whirring sound. This mirrors Archie's own "search mode" or combat activation, but the red coloring implies a more aggressive or perhaps "evil" version of the Artificial Robotic Canine Hyper-Intelligence Entity.
2016	Ouija: Origin of Evil	A woman in an institute who is told that she has a visitor who claims to be her niece. She turns around and is shown to be Paulina Zander from the first movie.
2016	M.S. Dhoni: The Untold Story	After the credits, the real MS Dhoni walks by the boundaries.
2016	Boo! A Madea Halloween	A collection of outtakes and bloopers runs during the end credits.
2016	My Little Pony: Equestria Girls – Legend of Everfree	In a post-credits scene, the Equestria Girls finish rebuilding the new Camp Everfree dock once more. Pinkie Pie wants to celebrate the dock's completion, but she accidentally causes the confetti and marshmallows she throws onto the dock to explode, destroying it all over again. The girls stare in complete disbelief, and Rarity faints.
2016	Hardcore Henry	During the credits, a recording from Jimmy tells Henry he has another thing to do.
2016	Popstar: Never Stop Never Stopping	The CMZ staff mock The Style Boyz reunion, but then talk about their own miserable lives.
2016	Maalai Naerathu Mayakkam	In a post-credits scene, Manoja cooks food for Prabhu. Although the food tastes bad, Prabhu asks Manoja to bring some more. After Manoja moves to the kitchen, Prabhu laments to the audience as to how he can eat such bad food all his life.
2016	Pride and Prejudice and Zombies	The members in the wedding party see a zombie horde approaching, led by Mr. Wickham.
2016	The Huntsman: Winter's War	In a post-credits scene, a fully recovered Snow White is seen on her balcony. A golden crow lands on the railing beside her.
2016	Batman: The Killing Joke	Barbara Gordon (in a wheelchair following the Joker's attack on her) enters a secret laboratory in her home, deciding to continue heroics as Oracle.
2016	Yoga Hosers	Two Colleens sing a rock version of "O Canada" featuring a guitar solo by Guy Lapointe.; Toward the end of the credits, a clip from the Smodcast episode in which Kevin Smith and Scott Mosier first utter the phrase "yoga hoser" is heard.
2016	The Jungle Book	The book titled The Jungle Book open up and feature King Louie climbing out of the temple ruins and singing a song. The pages flip and feature different characters from the movie.
2016	The Secret Life of Pets	Mel (dress up as a Minion) and Buddy (dressed up as a Teddy) visit a party in Leonard's apartment. The party stops when Leonard's owner comes home. After Leonard's owner asks him if he was a good boy, the ceiling lamp falls with Tattoo, who smiles nervously.; Pops says, "All right, party's over!"
2016	Theri	In a post-credits scene, Vijay, an older Nivi, and Annie are in Ladakh. Vijay, who has changed his identity to Dharmeshwar, secretly continues to assist the CBI in solving various cases.; A collection of outtakes runs during the credits.; In a second post-credits scene, "Raangu Raangu" is sung.
2016	Grimsby	Nobby sneaking onto a ship to meet Sebastian. After shooting a number of men, he finally sees Sebastian who asks if he's met the rest of the team.; Nobby and Sevastian are driving to the soccer stadium. They stop and ask a local for directions. Nobby then shoots the man, saying "leave no witnesses."
2016	Get a Job	Will and his crew are at a motel filming a commercial for I Stalk U.
2016	Deepwater Horizon	before the credits. The movie postscript reads: "The blowout lasted for 87 days, spilling an estimated 210 million gallons of oil into the Gulf of Mexico. It was the worst oil disaster in U.S. history."
2016	Kingsglaive: Final Fantasy XV	In a post-credits scene, Noctis and his companions are en route to Altissia when their car breaks down, leading into the opening scenes of Final Fantasy XV.
2016	Bad Santa 2	There pictures of Marcus being tea-bagged by Willie
2016	Doctor Strange	In a cut-down scene from Thor: Ragnarok, Dr. Stephen Strange asks Thor why he is on Earth.; Karl Mordo takes away Jonathan Pangborn's magic, stating that there are "too many sorcerers".
2016	Storks	There are some photos of the babies accumulating in a pile and then a huge, scrolling wall filled with baby pictures as a background.
2016	Kadavul Irukaan Kumaru	In a post-credits scene, Kumar, Nancy Hugging and Karthik Kumar, Balaji, Selfiee.; a collection of outtakes and bloopers during the end credits.
2016	Veera Sivaji	In a post-credits scene, Ramesh, Suresh, CBI Officer, Prisoner and Foreign Lady.
2016	Sing	The squids are singing "Faith".
2016	Achcham Yenbadhu Madamaiyada	In a mid-credits scene, Rajinikanth Muralitharan and Leela Muralitharan, in a Kiss and hug.
2016	My Little Pony: Equestria Girls – Legend of Everfree	The girls restore the dock once again, only for Pinkie to accidentally destroy it with her exploding foods.
2016	Barbershop: The Next Cut	Barack Obama comes to the barbershop to get a trim from Eddie.
2016	An American Girl Story – Melody 1963: Love Has to Win	A short tribute to the four young victims of the Birmingham bombing appears in a post-credits sequence.
2016	Trolls	The various troll characters perform a musical number while the credits scroll by.; Chef and Creek roll to a stop on their serving cart on wilderness, where they to falls victim to one of the hill-like predators.
2016	Moana	Tamatoa, who was flipped to his back in the middle of the film, tries to get up and tells the viewers that if his name was Sebastian and had a cool Jamaican accent they would have helped him by now.
2016	Robinson Crusoe	During the post-credits, Mal and May and the other herd of cats holding onto the Watchtower and are found by the wolves who attack them.
2016	Monster High: Great Scarrier Reef	In a post-credits scene, in the Great Scarrier Reef, Posea is delighted to see Lagoona's –and Kala's– plants return to full health. At the end, there is a note dedicating this film to Tori, a Make-A-Wish Foundation child who got to design an exclusive doll and provide two lines in the film.
2016	Remo	In a post-credits scene, acting along with his best friend Vallikanth in a movie which seems to be his life story named 'Remo Nee Kadhalan', directed by K. S. Ravikumar, in which actress Sri Divya plays the role of Kavya as Dr. Divya.
2016	Thomas & Friends: The Great Race	Den, Dart, Paxton and Cranky search for Diesel at the docks, only to find him loaded on a ship sailing far away.
2016	Railroad Tigers	A collection of bloopers and outtakes runs during the end credits.
2016	Inner Workings	During the credits, Paul starts performing other fun activities with his bosses and coworkers, marries Kate, and has children with her in "California Loco" is sung.
2016	Sully	Pictures of the rescue and evacuation of US Airways 1549 are shown.; We see all 155 passengers of US Airways 1549 meet with the real Chesley Sullenberger and his wife, Lorrie Sullenberger. He says “This is your captain speaking” and all of the passengers laugh. After that, Lorrie said that she read every letter that came to her house
2016	Absolutely Fabulous: The Movie	Political commentator, Jeremy Paxman, looks into the camera and says "People should be back to watching videos of kittens. Now bugger off!"
2016	Devi	In a mid-credits scene, Krishna and Devi live happily and have a child by the time. Krishna goes out to work, but he is possessed by Ruby, whose name tag is back again. This scene sets the stage for the sequel.; In a mid-credits scene, Raj is swarmed by his fans asking for an autograph, and in the midst of all, he recognizes a hand stretched out, asking for his autograph. He asked for her name, and she answered, "Ruby". It is understood that Ruby has possessed her body.; A collection of outtakes and during the end credits.; In a second mid-credits scene, "Rail Gaddi" is sung.
2016	Akira	In a mid-credits scene, she starts living her late father's life in Jodhpur and is living peacefully there teaching deaf children.
2016	Yo-kai Watch: Soratobu Kujira to Double no Sekai no Daibōken da Nyan!	During the credits, real-life recreations of scenes from the Yo-kai Watch anime are shown, along with some additional scenes like Amy getting a pet kitten.; Second, during the credits, a song is sung.; In a post-credits scene, Lord Enema, Zazel eating Sushi and sequel.
2016	Piper	In a post-credits scene, sleeping in the nest with her mother and using shells as a pillow.
2016	Befikre	In the post-credits scene, Dharam and Shyra kiss.
2016	Persona 3 The Movie: No. 4, Winter of Rebirth	Elizabeth is seen leaving the Velvet Room, where the elevator had stopped now that Makoto's contract has been fulfilled.
2017	Kong: Skull Island	Hank Marlow reunites with his wife and son for the first time. Then he sits down with a beer and hot dog and watches the Cubs game.; Presaging a shared fictional universe – the MonsterVerse – Houston Brooks and San Lin welcome James Conrad and Mason Weaver to Monarch, before discussing when monsters such as Godzilla, Mothra, King Ghidorah, and Rodan will return to reclaim the Earth. Scene closes with Godzilla's roar being heard in the background.
2017	Transformers: The Last Knight	Quintessa, in human form, meeting a man who is examining one of the horns in the desert. She warns the man that "he" does not like being touched. When asked who, she replies "Unicron"., and offers a way to destroy him.
2017	Ezra	In a mid-credit scene, the Dybbuk box is found by two young men along the seashore in Mumbai. They carry it away, planning to open it.
2017	Guardians of the Galaxy Vol. 2	Kraglin Obfonteri plays around with Yondu Udonta's whistle-powered Yaka arrow, accidentally hitting Drax in his neck.; Stakar Ogord and Martinex reunite with their old teammates Charlie-27, Aleta Ogord, Mainframe, and Krugarr in Yondu's memory.; Ayesha reveals her plans to stop the Guardians of the Galaxy, a being named "Adam".; A teenage Groot refuses to clean his room, much to Peter Quill's annoyance.; Stan Lee tells a rambling story to an audience of Watchers. The Watchers begin sidling slowly away as Lee calls after them.
2017	Si3	In a mid-credits scene, Singam receives a call from Home Minister Ramanathan, who calls him for another mission.
2017	Daddy's Home 2	The cast sings "Do They Know It's Christmas?", and eventually Mel Gibson dances with a woman and then sings a line from the song.; Don droning on and on to the workers taking down the nativity scene. The others eventually leave while Don continues to talk.
2017	Adhe Kangal	In a mid-credits scene, Panju receiving commemorations from people for his efforts in nabbing Vasundhara.
2017	A.R.C.H.I.E 2: Mission Impawsible	Archie (voiced by Michael J. Fox) appears on a circus-style stage with a red velvet curtain background and an "APPLAUSE" sign.
2017	Sachin: A Billion Dreams	In a video after the credits, though equally loving each member of his family, Sachin's father expresses that Sachin is and will be special for him forever.
2017	Diary of a Wimpy Kid: The Long Haul	Greg, Rowley, and Rodrick take selfies with two teenage girls who recognize Greg from the Diaper Hands meme.
2017	Pirates of the Caribbean: Dead Men Tell No Tales	In a post-credits scene, Will and Elizabeth are asleep in a bedroom when the shadow of Davy Jones enters. When the figure moves closer with his claw, Will wakes up to see nobody in the room. Assuming it was a nightmare, Will turns toward his wife and goes back to sleep, unaware of the barnacles lying on the floor next to the bed. (Note: While the post-credits scene teased a potential plot involving Davy Jones, who appears in some form while Will and Elizabeth sleep, directors Joachim Ronning and Espen Sandberg also hinted that it could be the "beginning of the end" or "just a dream or nightmare".)
2017	Rough Night	In a mid-credits scene, Pippa sings lyrics that allude to the evening.; In a post-credits scene, Alice finds the thief's stolen diamonds that had been stashed in a box of naughty pasta from the bachelorette party.
2017	Toilet: Ek Prem Katha	In the end credits, villagers are shown lining up to use mobile toilets outside their village while the construction of toilets throughout the village proceeds.
2017	The Hitman's Bodyguard	Ryan Reynolds is shown waiting to start filming. Nearby church bells go off and prevent him from starting. After sitting there waiting with the bells continuing to ring, he finally looks up and says, "What is this, the director's cut?"
2017	Shivalinga	In the end credits, Shiva and a pregnant Sathya reunite.
2017	A Gentleman	Dixit buys machine guns from a local gun store in Miami before putting on a hoodie and walking away.
2017	Maragadha Naanayam	During the credits, while Senguttavan and Elango are boarding a bus to return home, they bump into Ramanathan again, who is now on the run. He tells them as his henchman had touched the stone, he and his gang were pursued by the mysterious lorry and his henchman was killed, while he barely managed to escape. But a few minutes later, a pilgrim who had earlier encountered Ramanathan and his gang while they were in pursuit of Senguttavan, Elango and the three ghosts, returns the stone to him, thus activating the curse on Ramanathan and the pilgrim.; A Collection of outtakes and during the end credits.
2017	Roman J. Israel, Esq.	Colin Farrell's presenting Roman's case to the Supreme Court.
2017	Captain Underpants: The First Epic Movie	In a mid-credits scene, George and Harold realize that Mr. Krupp's secretary Miss Anthrope, whom they put on the phone via a false competition for $1 billion, has been on the phone for the entire film, prompting them to shut off the call to her dismay.
2017	The Nut Job 2: Nutty by Nature	A collection for bloopers and outtakes during the end credits; In a post-credits scene, Raccoon, the villain from the first film, tries to swim back to New York City for his revenge, unaware he is trailed by the sharks, leaving his fate unknown.
2017	Bogan	In a post-credits scene, to everyone's horror, Aadhithya is shown to have survived and glares into the screen, paving the way to the sequel.
2017	Ferdinand	Una, Dos, and Cuatro carrying food saying they wish Tres was here. Then a light blue hind leg appears to the left of the screen and they drop their food in shock.
2017	The Lego Batman Movie	The movie's closing credits involved Oh, Hush!'s song "Friends Are Family". The main title of the movie appears at the end of the song, before Batman covers the camera afterwards while commenting.
2017	Kavan	In a mid-credits scene, boldly admit their crimes to Thilak and defend themselves, but unfortunately for them, their confession is recorded by the Police Commissioner, who was working undercover in Muthamizh. Kalyan and Dheeran are arrested. Thilak, Mayilvaganan, Malar, Jagan, Pillai, Nisha and Aishwarya celebrate their victory.
2017	Okja	Jay is released from prison and gets on board a bus with K and the other members of the organization. With their newest member Kim Woo-shik, a former driver for Mirando Corporation, they plan to disrupt a major meeting involving all of the Mirando shareholders.
2017	Vanamagan	the end-credits sequences feature a montage of wildlife, lush jungles, and country landscapes.
2017	Sangili Bungili Kadhava Thorae	In a mid-credits scene, a ball is shown bouncing in a dark room and the other shot shows the child from earlier sitting on a drawer, swinging its legs.
2017	Pokémon the Movie: I Choose You!	In the end credits, all of Ash Ketchum's former traveling companions from Kanto to Kalos are shown. Verity returns to her hometown to see his mother; Sorrel and his Lucario spot an Articuno which he wanted to study; Cross travels peacefully with his Pokémon; and Ash and Pikachu travel on their own while being tailed by Team Rocket. The film ends as Ho-Oh drops a Rainbow Wing as it flies across the sky.
2017	Teen Titans: The Judas Contract	Jericho is shown to have survived being shot by Mother Mayhem and manifested superpowers.
2017	Smurfs: The Lost Village	Gargamel, his cat Azrael and his bird, Monty walking together. Gargamel is mumbling about his failure to catch Smurfs and blaming his cat. He also mumbles about the crew from the credits and says to shut off the music.
2017	Meesaya Murukku	In a mid-credits scene, Adhi becomes a popular personality in hip-hop music and in five years Adhi and Jeeva become famous music directors in cinema.; During the credits, "Hey Meesaya Murukku" is sung.
2017	Ok Jaanu	An end credits roll plays the rest of their story in animation, with them finally living together one day and starting a family.
2017	Cars 3	Mater is in his workshop and a video call rings and makes him knock over a whole bunch of tires and hanging up on the call. He then looks around and says, "Eh, technology!"
2017	Spider-Man: Homecoming	In prison, Adrian Toomes reunites Mac Gargan and pretends not to know Spider-Man's identity.; Steve Rogers as Captain America delivers a PSA to the audience about patience.
2017	My Little Pony: The Movie	Princess Celestia is shown raising the sun at the end.
2017	Backkom Bear: Agent 008	Backkom and Jessica try to prevent penguins from destroying the world. But Backkom fails and is pursued by the penguins into the frozen castle.
2017	Descendants 2	During the credits, Evie requests that Dizzy be allowed to attend Auradon Prep; when Dizzy is offered, she excitedly accepts.; In a mid-credits scene, Uma addresses the audience, promising that the story is not over.
2017	Gemini Ganeshanum Suruli Raajanum	in a post-credits scene, his fiancée Pooja asks him to apologize to his ex-girlfriends and invite them to their wedding.; A collection of outtakes.
2017	Ivan Thanthiran	in a mid-credits scene, Devaraj and Balaji, announcer radio.
2017	Wolf Warrior 2	Feng is allowed by his commander to return to his military squadron and is shown a video revealing that Xiaoyun is still alive.
2017	Annabelle: Creation	In a scene presaging the next film in the shared The Conjuring Universe, The Nun, the "Demon Nun" Valak is shown haunting a monastery in Romania.
2017	Saravanan Irukka Bayamaen	In a post-credits scene, Saravanan, Swamy, Curtain Sharma and Thenmozhi.
2017	Spyder	In a mid-credits scene, "Boom Boom" is sung.
2017	Kuso	After the credits, Busdriver performs another spoken-word piece about surviving the earthquake.
2017	Kattappava Kanom	In a mid-credits scene, When Kattappa ends up in their house, they discover that it is indeed a lucky fish.
2017	Fist Fight	Tracy Morgan's character "singing" a rap song to the 911 responder from earlier in the film. Then he hits on her as she chuckles and walks away.
2017	Goon: Last of the Enforcers	A collection of outtakes and during the end credits.; in a post-credits scene, a female reporter talks about the Hockey Story. Doug doesn't know if he's a Gretzky and steals her microphone.
2017	Baahubali 2: The Conclusion	Before the credits roll, Mahendra orders his men to toss the head of Bhallaladeva's statue out of the palace walls, where it is swept to the great waterfall. It breaks as it falls and crashes against the cliff's walls and lands near the lingam that Mahendra carried earlier.; During the credits, a little girl listening to the story suggests that Mahendra and Avantika's child will become the new king of Mahishmati. The narrator suggests that that is another story.
2017	Arjun Reddy	In the first post-credits scene, Preethi tells Arjun that she left her husband three days after the marriage and hasn't even contacted her family since then; she tells him that the child is his. They share an emotional reunion and get married, with the consent of Arjun' family.; In the second post-credits scene, Devdas visits them soom and apologizes for being insensitive to their pure relationship.
2017	The Big Bad Fox and Other Tales...	The end credits begin with a return to the stage of all the characters. As the credits roll, various characters appear, including a frog sweeper, who is cleaning up the scene.
2017	Nene Raju Nene Mantri	In a mid-credits scene, Radha is shown sitting on a swing, and Jogendra comes to her and shows his love, which ultimately shows their reunion in heaven.
2017	Power Rangers	In a mid-credits scene, back at school, the teacher announces that Tommy Oliver will join them, but the desk is empty save for a green jacket (Note: In the source material, Tommy Oliver was a male, but the cast of the film and the actor who played Oliver in the source material expressed interest in a female version of the character in a sequel.) while Billy Cranston's locker explodes in the hallway.
2017	The Emoji Movie	Smiler is shown in the Loser Lounge with the other forgotten and unused emoji. She's shown wearing braces with headgear and playing Go Fish, which she loses to the fish cracker emoji.
2017	Mersal	In a mid-credits scenes, Maaran has conferred a statewide recognised medical counselor post.
2017	Batman and Harley Quinn	Harley Quinn has returned to being Dr. Harleen Quinzel and she now has a reality game show, where she makes her patients face their fears on an elaborate obstacle course.
2017	Snatched	Emily and Linda are shown dancing.
2017	Woody Woodpecker	"Niagara Fools", a 1956 short starring Woody Woodpecker, is shown after the end credits.
2017	Pitch Perfect 3	Moments that happen after the events of this film are shown.; There is a montage of clips from the production of the film and short deleted scenes.
2017	The Mountain Between Us	A split second before the two embrace, the screen cuts to black and the credits roll.
2017	Baywatch	the two Mitches sit side by side in beach chairs.
2017	Vivegam	As the credits roll, A Collection of Behind the scenes and director Siva.
2017	It	After the credits roll, Pennywise can be heard laughing, before a caption confirms his return in It Chapter Two.
2017	Cult of Chucky	Kyle arrives at Andy's cabin to continue torturing Chucky.
2017	The Lego Ninjago Movie	At the beginning of the credits there is an animated sequence of Garmadon teaching everyone the "Dance of Doom."; In the extra scene later, there is a gag reel with Jackie Chan catching flying bowls.
2017	Thor: Ragnarok	In a mid-credits scene, the Asgardians' ship is intercepted by a large spacecraft. (Note: According to producer Kevin Feige, the spaceship seen in the mid-credits scene is the Sanctuary II, which belongs to Thanos.); In a post-credits scene, the overthrown Grandmaster is confronted by his former subjects.
2017	A StoryBots Christmas	A present is seen on some snow as a polar bear tries to drink some beer as it freezes, he screams "No!"
2017	Boo 2! A Madea Halloween	A collection of outtakes and bloopers runs during the end credits.
2017	Ravenous	In a post-credits scene, the newly zombified Bonin and Tania stand in front of a tower of stacked chairs on which stands a parrot.
2017	A Bad Moms Christmas	The end credits feature dancing from characters in the film.
2017	Tiger Zinda Hai	In a mid-credits scene, "Swag Se Swagat" is sung.
2017	Wonder	Isabel's artwork with drawings of Auggie in his space helmet are shown.
2017	Justice League	Superman and Barry have a friendly race to see whose of them is faster.; In a post-credits scene, Lex Luthor has escaped from Arkham Asylum and recruits Slade Wilson to form a league of their own.
2017	The Boss Baby	Tim ask his mom for a few more minutes of play before bedtime.; The Gandalf alarm clock tells the audience it's time to leave.
2017	The Disaster Artist	Tommy has a verbal exchange with Henry (played by the real Tommy Wiseau), a party-goer with a similar accent and mannerisms who offers to hang out, but he refuses.
2017	Bayama Irukku	In the post-credits scenes, Jai, Lekha, and his four friends live happily in the village. Lekha uses her supernatural abilities to do chores, play charades (and helping Mak win for the first time), scare off villagers who are attempting to drive her away (who are led by the village drunk's son), and even run the town's "haunted house" attraction. It is also revealed that her child also possesses some of her abilities, even though he is still an infant.
2017	Meyaadha Maan	in a mid-credits scene, Madhu and Murali sign the marriage papers in the register office and the movie ends with Murali singing on stage with his wife Madhu recording his performance.
2017	Ray Meets Helen	A series of characters from the film each sing different parts of the song "Beautiful Dreamer" throughout the credits.
2017	Paddington 2	During the credits, Knuckles, Phibs, and Spoon are pardoned, and Knuckles opens a sandwich business. Buchanan is sentenced to 10 years in prison; six months later, he is shown to be putting his experience as a performer to further use by hosting shows for the inmates and providing entertainment throughout the building. The book was handed over to the Browns after it was released from the authorities.
2017	Fullmetal Alchemist	In a mid-credit scene, Envy is revealed to have survived Mustang's attack as its true parasitic form escapes from its human body's charred remains.
2017	The Babysitter	A firefighter going through Cole's house is attacked by Bee, who survived her wounds.
2017	Jumanji: Welcome to the Jungle	There is the sound of drums.
2017	Only the Brave	The end credits dedicate the film to the nineteen fallen firefighters, displaying photos of the real hotshots alongside the actors who played them in the film, and notes that the Yarnell Hill Fire remains the largest loss of firefighter life in a single day since the September 11th attacks.
2017	Yo-kai Watch Shadowside: Oni-ō no Fukkatsu	First, during the credits, "Yuki no Hi no Saikai" (Snowy Day Reunion) is sung.; Second, during the credits, "Yo Kai Yo Kai" is sung.; In a post-credits scene, Enma orders Zazel to quickly stop the Onimaro invasion happening in the human world. When Uula breaks the news of Enma escaping from the prison cell, Lord Ananta is annoyed at the unexpected situation, while his mentor is unsurprised that Enma managed to break out, chiding Ananta for thinking it would actually hold him.
2017	Marshall	Closing credits note that Sam Friedman went on to work in many civil rights cases, while Thurgood Marshall had an illustrious career as the American Civil Rights Movement's principal legal strategist and the first African American Justice on the Supreme Court of the United States.
2017	Journey to the West: The Demons Strike Back	In a post-credits scene, a moviegoer in a modern movie theater tells his friends to wait for a post-credits scene that is expected to follow a blockbuster, but they are told by theater employees (played by Tsui Hark and Stephen Chow) that this is not a blockbuster so there is no post-credits scene.
2018	Fifty Shades Freed	Shows pregnant Ana with Christan and their first child happy at their home's garden.
2018	Gulaebaghavali	In a mid-credits scene, A parallel storyline involves Mayilvaganam and a don named Annachi (Rajendran), which ultimately culminates in the climax.
2018	Thaanaa Serndha Koottam	In a post-credits scene, He then reveals the all police forces with Kurunjivendhan are actually the men he gave jobs using the heist money. He escapes the place with ease.
2018	Cats and Peachtopia	In the post-credits scene, all the animals move to Blanket and Cape's apartment, while Cape is exploring through a space station.
2018	The Captain	The ending credits are accompanied by a sequence of Herold and his group driving through the streets of modern-day Görlitz in their Mercedes-Benz G3, eventually stopping to accost and harass local passersby on foot.
2018	Peter Rabbit	During the end credits, it is shown that Bea, Thomas and the rabbits eventually moved to London together where Thomas has his own toy shop and Bea begins to write and illustrate books based on Peter and his friends. It's implied that Bea and Thomas are now a couple.; As the credits end, there is a faint groan.
2018	Black Panther	In a mid-credits scene, T'Challa appears before the United Nations to reveal Wakanda's true nature to the world.; In a post-credits scene, Shuri helps Bucky Barnes with his recovery.
2018	Ee.Ma.Yau.	In the mid-credits scene, the corpse of the dog that would accompany the grave-digger everywhere is shown. And in the distant horizon of the sea there are two boats with lit lanterns and people dressed in cloaks, approaching the beach. It's revealed that the two men playing cards from the beginning of the movie, were in fact Angels who had come to the beach to carry forward the souls of Vavachan, the mallard, the gravedigger and the dog to their respective destinations; Hell and Heaven.
2018	Early Man	At the end of the credits: "No dinosaurs or rabbits were harmed during the making of this feature."
2018	Game Night	The extensive planning used by Gary to pull off the "Reinstitution of Myself in Game Night Master Plan".; Denzel Washington meets Debbie (Gary the cop's wife) at a gas station.
2018	Nimir	In the credits, Selvam is seen uniting with Malar.
2018	Super Troopers 2	body-cam footage is shown from the ill-fated ride along with Fred Savage.; The police officers have been called to rescue a cat out of a tree. After Fred Savage learns that their job entails them calling the fire department for the rescue, he begins climbing the tree to rescue the cat himself. He falls out of the tree and manages to land safely, only to be hit and killed by the arriving firetruck.; As the credits roll, there is a blooper reel and video of the Fred Savage incident is also shown.; In a post-credits scene, Farva blends his pinky toe into a smoothie and drinks it straight out of the blender, the result of losing a bet with Rabbit during the movie. He finds it delicious.
2018	St. Agatha	At the end of the credits, Mother Superior's voice screams, "Agatha!"
2018	Tomb Raider	Lara Croft returns to Alan's pawn shop to buy weapons. She decides to take two identical pistols. This is a reference to the character's famous dual pistols from the original game series.
2018	The 15:17 to Paris	In a mid-credits scene, with a parade in honour of the three friends in the town they grew up in, Sacramento.
2018	Operation Red Sea	Before the end credits, 5 Chinese naval vessels intercept 3 US Navy ships warning them they have entered Chinese waters and must leave immediately.
2018	Avengers: Infinity War	Before Nick Fury disintegrates in the Blip, he uses a pager to call Carol Danvers.
2018	Krishnarjuna Yudham	In a post-credits scene, How Krishna and Arjun try to track down the traffickers to rescue the girls forms the climax of the story.
2018	Batman Ninja	Catwoman sells weapons and furniture from the castle robots to an antique shop, while Bruce rides a horse-driven Batmobile to a party hosted by the mayor.
2018	Jurassic World: Fallen Kingdom	In a post-credits scene, the three Pteranodons fly around and ultimately settle down on the Eiffel Tower replica in Las Vegas.
2018	Blackmail	In a mid-credits scene reveals that Dev sabotaged his boss's marketing plan and a song plays showing Dev and Reena's wedding 7 years prior.
2018	Race 3	During the credits, "Allah Duhah Hai" is sung.; In a mid-credits scene, Sikander makes a metaphorical statement and calls himself the "Tiger" of a new race as he refuses to elaborate.
2018	Bharat Ane Nenu	In a mid-credits scene, Bharath going with his family to Vasumathi's village residence, to propose marriage to her.
2018	Hotel Artemis	a shadowy figure runs across the screen, suggesting Nice may have also survived.
2018	Veere Di Wedding	In a mid-credits scene, Avni finds that Bhandari is interested in her, and decides to give him a chance.
2018	Detective Chinatown 2	During the credits, Qin Feng lets him go, but later KIKO reveals that "Q"'s IP address does not locate him in America, making Song Yi as "Q" unlikely. "Q" is therefore still at large in "Happy Chinatown' is sung.
2018	The First Purge	The chief of staff announces the results of the experiment and announces that they may go nationwide as soon as next year.; Later in the credits, there's an advertisement for The Purge TV series.
2018	Raju Gadu	with the post-credits; Raju again steals the wedding chain at the time of his marriage.
2018	Tag	Before the credits roll, video clips and a photograph are displayed of the real group of ten men that inspired the film, who continue to play to this day.
2018	Suspiria	Susie Bannion is shown making a sign.
2018	Srinivasa Kalyanam	In the end credits, it is told that many people's lives changed due to their wedding, including Kavya who reconciles with her husband Siddhu, from whom she wanted to divorce.
2018	Overboard	Wedding toasts and jokes by friends and family.
2018	Crazy Rich Asians	In a mid-credits scene, Astrid looks over at a man standing next to her and smiles, clearly recognizing him. (Note: Played by Harry Shum Jr., the man is unidentified but is credited as Charlie Wu, known in the novel the film is based on as Astrid's ex-boyfriend.)
2018	Set It Up	In a mid-credits scene, Creepy Tim watches the couple through security cameras.
2018	Teen Titans Go! To the Movies	Everyone demands that they cut to the credits immediately with Robin attempting to stall so that "kids can ask their parents questions". Starfire tells him that this is not the type of movie for that. Robin then swings up to the screen to tell the children watching to ask their parents where babies come from, and the credits roll.; In a mid-credits scene, the Teen Titans from the 2003 series show up on a distorted screen telling the viewers that they "may have found a way back".; The Challengers of the Unknown and their leader Ace Morgan are revealed to have been teleported to the end of the credits, postulating that they missed the movie. Theatrical prints also include the message "TO BE CONTINUED ON CARTOON NETWORK".
2018	Raambo 2	A post-credits scene shows Krishna happily married to his love Mayuri, still satirically scared on his memories to that road trip, during his wedding night.
2018	Action Point	Boozie Bear and bear mascot guy are sitting on stairs outside the house.
2018	Tik Tik Tik	In a mid-credits scene, where Vasu reveals that the whole crew knows about Mahendran, who proceeds to kill himself backstage while Vasu, Appu and Venkat walk away.; a collection of behind the scenes and during the credits.
2018	Incredibles 2	The Underminer is seen escaping in a cartoonish 2-D design.
2018	Dog Days	Tyler asks Dax what the name of his band means and then Dax tells Charlie to attack Tyler, which Charlie does not do.
2018	The Death of Superman	A clone of Superman survives numerous failed experiments from LexCorp, Dr. John Henry Irons is seen forging his own Superman suit from steel, Superman's rocket buries itself in the North Pole, resulting in the creation of the Fortress of Solitude, and a Superman-like cyborg with Hank Henshaw's face is seen flying in space, heading towards Earth.
2018	Ant-Man and the Wasp	In a mid-credits scene, Pym, Lang, Hope, and Janet plan to harvest quantum energy to help Ava remain stable. While Lang is in the quantum realm doing this, the other three turn to dust. Due to the Blip which began at the end of Avengers: Infinity War (2018).; Lang's pet giant ant entertains himself by playing drums as the Emergency Broadcast System plays in the background.
2018	Mamma Mia! Here We Go Again	The end credits show all the characters, including Donna and the younger cast, at a party at Hotel Bella Donna ("Super Trouper").; In 1979, the passport stamper hits on Bill before singing ABBA's "Take a Chance on Me"; the scene extends into a gag-take.
2018	Duck Duck Goose	Larry, a turtle who was trying to warn Peng of Banzou's intentions, makes his way to valley, only to find everyone gone. In the movie where characters said Birds of a feather migrate together.
2018	Adrift	It is revealed in the credits that Richard Sharp was swept overboard and never found; Tami Oldham Ashcraft survived alone aboard Hazaña for a total of 41 days before she was rescued. She continues to be an avid sailor.; During the credits, a series of news articles, pictures and a video of the actual Tami and Richard are shown.
2018	Sui Dhaaga	As the end credits roll, it is shown that the family is free from their financial struggles, Sui Dhaaga's designs are being marketed all over the world, and Mauji and Mamta have opened up a tailoring school to encourage others like them to become self-reliant.
2018	Fanney Khan	As the credits roll, "Junior Late Sharma" and "Tera Jaisa Tu Hai" are sung.
2018	Suspiria	In a post-credits scene, Susie stares approvingly at something outside the academy.
2018	Pokémon the Movie: The Power of Us	In the post-credits, the Pokémon Channel announcer is revealed to be Rick as Risa demands to know how he knew where she was, Ash and Pikachu head to their next location.
2018	Detective Dee: The Four Heavenly Kings	In a mid-credits scene, In the ensuing battle at the Da Li Si, the powerful illusions of Faceless Monster prove too strong for Dee and his men, until Yuan Ce appears and defeats the leader of the Wind Warriors. Afterwards, Dee and Yuchi are reinstated in their positions.
2018	Little Italy	A collection of outtakes and bloopers during the credits.
2018	To All the Boys I've Loved Before	Peter and Lara Jean walk off the lacrosse field. Kitty answers the door to find John Ambrose standing on their doorstep holding the letter that she wrote him.
2018	Kadaikutty Singam	In a mid-credits scene, Gunasingam and Iniya give birth to a girl and choose to adapt to permanent birth control to ensure that past events do not repeat themselves.
2018	Sanju	In a mid-credits scene, "Baba Baba Hai Bas Ho Gaya" is sung and featuring Sanjay Dutt.
2018	Karwaan	While the credits are rolling simultaneously, a scene shows Avinash organising a photography exhibition and has invited Shaukat, Tahira, Tanya, and Amey, his IT colleague. He is also in a relationship with his air hostess neighbour whom he used to meet daily in his apartment's lift.
2018	Assassination Nation	A marching band performs while marching down a battle-scarred street in Salem.
2018	The Spy Who Dumped Me	Audrey, Morgan, and Sebastian doing a mission together in Japan.; Tess and two Aussie tourists are being interviewed on news channels. Tess tells the interviewer how she thinks about Audrey after seeing her on the news while the tourists tell how their waist bags are stolen by Audrey and Morgan. They also tell the interviewer how they think of them. The scenes with Tess and the Aussie tourists are switched back and forth.
2018	The House with a Clock in Its Walls	During the closing credits, the chair chases the winged lion topiary with a chainsaw. Then a statement appears: "No chairs or topiary griffins were harmed in the making of this film."; At the end of the closing credits, the film's cast wave goodbye.
2018	Happy Phirr Bhag Jayegi	In a mid-credits scene, "Chin Chin Chu" is sung.
2018	The Nutcracker and the Four Realms	During the credits, Misty Copeland dances a traditional ballet to the "Miniature Overture" from "The Nutcracker". The outlines of male dancers performing a more hip-hop dance to the same music follow.
2018	Christopher Robin	Richard M. Sherman is on a piano singing "Busy Doing Nothing" at a beach. Then, Pooh, Eeyore, Tigger, and Piglet in beach chairs with sunglasses. Then Eeyore says "Thanks for noticing me."
2018	Devadas	In a mid-credits scene, Deva and Das enjoy a holiday on a cruise along with Jahnvi and Pooja.
2018	Seemaraja	In the mid-credits scene, Seema Raja and Selvi live happily ever after.; A collection of behind the scenes and outtakes and director Ponram.
2018	A Simple Favor	Emily is seen in prison, winning a basketball game with other prisoners.
2018	Kolamaavu Kokila	In a mid-credits scene, the family starts a legitimate business of Kolam powder, calling it 'Kokila kolamaavu'.
2018	Venom	In a mid-credits scene, Eddie Brock is invited to interview incarcerated serial killer Cletus Kasady, who promises "carnage" when he escapes.; In the post-credits scene, a preview of Spider-Man: Into the Spider-Verse is shown, where Prowler pursues Miles Morales.
2018	Halloween	Michael Myers is heard breathing.
2018	Lilli	As the credits roll, Lilli walks with her baby in one hand and a stick in the other.
2018	Helicopter Eela	In the credits, it is shown that she has resumed her singing finding herself after many years.
2018	Ralph Breaks the Internet	In a mid-credits scene, a toddler plays a game of Pancake Milkshake after watching the film, which disappoints her because one of the scenes from the trailer was not in the final version, but Ralph and Vanellope enter the game and crash it.; In a post-credits scene, a supposed-to-be sneak peek of Frozen II shifts to Ralph rickrolling the audience. Ralph then breaks the fourth wall telling the audience there are no more surprises to show up, ending the film.
2018	Uncle Drew	Jess places a series of phone calls to Dax's phone.
2018	Goosebumps 2: Haunted Halloween	As the credits finish rolling, Slappy can be heard shouting "Slappy Halloween!"
2018	A Star Is Born	In a mid-credits scene, reveal a flashback of Jack working on a song about his love for Ally, which he never finished writing. Ally performs this song as a tribute to Jack, introducing herself for the first time as Ally Maine.
2018	Geetha Govindam	In a mid-credits scene, Geetha kisses Vijay on their bus ride home.
2018	Beautiful Boy	Closing credits reveal Nic has been sober for eight years, and it would not have been possible without the love and support of his family and friends.; During the credits, Nic recites 'Let It Enfold You' by Charles Bukowski.
2018	Puppet Master: The Littlest Reich	In a post-credits scene, "Cuddly Bear" returns to his home and begs his wife to not ask why he is covered with blood.
2018	Kavacham	During the end credits scenes, Samyukta is declared the heir of S. company and confesses her love to Vijay.
2018	Animal World	In a mid-credits scene, Kaisi realizes that Anderson is the man who killed his father.
2018	Sherlock Gnomes	In the post-credits scene, lots of garden gnomes are falling making a picture of Sherlock Gnomes, when Moriarty blows a raspberry and laughs and Sherlock Gnomes smashes Moriarty.
2018	Aquaman	In a mid-credits scene, David is saved by Dr. Stephen Shin, a marine scientist and conspiracy theorist obsessed with Atlantis, and agrees to lead Shin there in exchange for help in his revenge on Arthur.
2018	2.0	In the first post-credits scene, Vaseegaran recovers in the hospital and tells Vijay Kumar, who comes to see him, that he feels Pakshi Rajan was a virtuous person who became a victim of the corrupt society. He also suggests that the audience reduce and control cell phone radiation and ensure that technology does not threaten the lives of all the living creatures in the world. Chitti, now restored to its original version, begins a relationship with Nila and "Endhira Logathu Sundariye" is sung.; In the second post-credits scene, Sana asks Vaseegaran over the phone about the probability of mobile phones flying again. Immediately, Vaseegaran's mobile flies out of his hand and morphs into Kutti 3.0, saying, "I am your grandson".
2018	Nativity Rocks!	During the credits, "We Built This City" is sung.
2018	Spider-Man: Into the Spider-Verse	Miles Morales embraces the responsibilities of his new life. Later, Gwen finds a way to contact Miles from her own dimension. (Note: In Spider-Man: Across the Spider-Verse (2023), this scene is established to take place sixteen months later.) In another dimension, Miguel O'Hara, also known as Spider-Man 2099, travels to Earth-67 and argues with its Spider-Man. (Note: This scene is a reference to a scene from the 1967–1970 Spider-Man TV series episode "Double Identity", in which the villain Charles Cameo dresses up like Spider-Man to impersonate him; the episode's scene has since become an Internet meme.)
2018	Vice	In a mid-credits scene, a focus group depicted earlier in the movie gets into another argument about the efficacy of the film and the presidency of Donald Trump, whereas some members of the group are uninterested and would rather discuss things other than politics.
2018	Silukkuvarupatti Singam	in a first post-credits scene, Sakthi marrying Raji, a phone call from Bhaskar telling Sakthi that Shankar has escaped from jail, and Raji (thinking that it is another undercover operation) indirectly telling Sakthi to capture Shankar again. On hearing this, Sakthi faints.; in a second post-credits scene, Tony, Cycle Shankar, PC Bhaskar, Chandran and Muthaiya.
2018	Sarkar	A Montages of videos and during the credits.
2018	Lakshmi	A collection of behind the scenes, during the credits.
2018	Smallfoot	Percy starts to record his next episode using his mobile phone, then stops and says, "Am I missing a tooth?"
2018	Bumblebee	Optimus Prime congratulates Bumblebee for succeeding in his mission, as the other Autobots enter Earth's atmosphere. Meanwhile, Charlie Watson finishes fixing her car, and takes it for a ride.
2018	Deadpool 2	Negasonic Teenage Warhead and her girlfriend Yukio repair Cable's time-traveling device for Wade. He uses it to save the lives of Vanessa Carlysle and X-Force member Pete Wisdom, and kills both X-Men Origins: Wolverine's version of Deadpool and actor Ryan Reynolds while he is considering starring in the film Green Lantern.; In the Super Duper Cut, Deadpool goes back in time to kill baby Hitler.
2018	Varathan	Abi locks the gate with a plaque saying Trespassers will be shot, where the end credits start to roll.
2018	Saamy 2	As the credits roll, Ram lies to the media that Raavana had left for Sri Lanka due to fear of being killed. There is a record of Raavana, going to Sri Lanka, but there is no record of returning to India. Whereas, Raavana dies after seventeen days in the desert. Soon, Ram and Diya marry. The movie ends with the message, "Saamy's adventure will continue".
2018	Tamizh Padam 2	During the credits, Shiva is released from prison after 25 years, but his grandmother kills him, showing her villainous "D" nature, albeit being acquitted in the first film.
2018	Kanaa	In the closing credits, it is shown that Indian women won the T20 final against West Indies women and Kowsi was appreciated by the Government of Tamil Nadu for her superb bowling tactics.
2018	Andhadhun	Closing credits read: "Thank You for the Music" and feature a montage of piano-playing characters from various Indian films.; During the end credits, a disclaimer shows that the transplant of human organs for commercial purpose is a crime and the film does not intend to support it.
2018	Padayottam	In a mid-credits scene, Senan and gang arrive at Reghu's house to apologise, but are interrupted when Britto offers a gift, having kidnapped Salman again.
2018	Simmba	In the post-credits scene, he chats with DCP Veer Sooryavanshi (Akshay Kumar) on the phone. and also congratulates him on his new post as the ATS chief. Sooryavanshi tells him that he will meet him soon, thus hinting the events of Sooryavanshi.; Second in the post-credits scene, "Mera Wala Dance" is sung.
2018	Goyo: The Boy General	In a mid-credits scene, Joven is rescued by Kiko and Eduardo Rusca, Luna's former aide. Decades later, both Aguinaldo and Quezon run for president in the 1935 election, while an older Rusca and Joven give a dismayed Aguinaldo a mocking salute.
2018	Master Z: Ip Man Legacy	In a mid-credits scene, Fung uses Wing Chun to defeat the boy who bullied him earlier.
2018	Thimiru Pudichavan	During the credits, Murugavel finally overcomes his insomnia and his blood pressure remains stabilized at normal during his sleep in "Nee Unnai Matrikondal" is sung.
2018	Stan & Ollie	Film clips and photos from the career of Laurel & Hardy are shown throughout the end credits.
2018	Yo-kai Watch: Forever Friends	During the credits and photo, "Remember Forever" is sung.; In a post-credits scene, Shin Shimomachi and Alistair flying stars.
2018	Bohemian Rhapsody	There is footage of the real band, Queen, performing the song "Don't Stop Me Now".
2019	Kim Possible	Dr. Drakken, posing as a gifted student with Shego posing as his mother, enrolls at Kim's high school and begins his plan to defeat her, leading into the events of the short series Kim Hushable.
2019	Reign of the Supermen	The Justice League gather at the Watchtower to confront Darkseid themselves, with Lex Luthor inviting himself in, saying that his contributions in stopping Henshaw qualifies him to be a member of the League.
2019	The Lego Movie 2: The Second Part	A montage of rotating images and end credits.
2019	Fighting with My Family	The end credits include footage from the original 2012 documentary, "The Wrestlers: Fighting With My Family," showcasing the family's actual lives and wrestling careers.
2019	Sarvam Thaala Mayam	During the credits, Later Iyer leaves the stage which makes Peter afraid that his teacher is angry with him for not following his strategy. But Iyer feels proud of him and happily claims Peter as his student. The film ends with Peter, now a celebrity, performing along with his teacher Iyer.
2019	Back Street Girls: Gokudols	In a mid-credits scene, Airi discovers that the ex-girlfriend had married another man immediately after Airi left, the daughter is not Airi's child, and faints upon learning the news.; In a post-credits scene, after Koizumi begs Inugane not to kill him while held at gunpoint, promising to do "anything", he sends him to Thailand for reassignment surgery and training to become an idol.
2019	White Snake	In the mid-credit scene, the fox-demon from the shop arrives to the same port delivering a box to a mysterious river monster under the bridge.
2019	Iron Sky: The Coming Race	In a mid-credit sequence, it is revealed that Mars has been colonized by the Soviet Union.
2019	Isn't It Romantic	During the credits, Natalie and the rest of the characters proceed to engage in a rendition of "Express Yourself".
2019	Total Dhamaal	In a post-credits scene, "Speaker Phat Jaaye" is sung.
2019	F2: Fun and Frustration	In a mid-credits scene, Venky, Varun, Harika, and Honey leave while the trapped people wait for the rescue team.
2019	Happy Death Day 2U	Tree, Carter, Ryan, Samar, and Dre are escorted by agents to a DARPA laboratory, where the reactor has been moved for further experimentation. When the agents say they need a test subject to see how the machine works, Tree says she knows the perfect test subject. In her bedroom, Danielle wakes up screaming in horror.
2019	Vantha Rajavathaan Varuven	In a mid-credits scene, Aadhi holding Raghunandan's hand with affection.
2019	A Madea Family Funeral	A collection of outtakes and bloopers runs during the end credits.
2019	At Eternity's Gate	A mid-credits scene features a narration by Gauguin regarding Vincent's favorite color: yellow.
2019	9	The mid-credits scene shows a cave with a painting on its walls, showing a cosmic creature with a female-like appearance tormenting people, indicating that Ava is real.
2019	Ek Ladki Ko Dekha Toh Aisa Laga	in a mid-credits scene, Balbir opens a restaurant and starts a relationship with Chatro. Billauri, claiming the gender of "Mr. X" is irrelevant, wins the bet on who Sweety would marry.
2019	Dev	in a mid-credits scene, They reconcile, and it is shown that they now have twin babies whom they are taking on their newest adventures. By this movie the authors try to spread the humanity among the peoples regarding the others.; A montage of picture frame and during the end credits.
2019	Uri: The Surgical Strike	Zameer, a Pakistani minister, wakes up and shouts in frustration while seeing the news of India's successful surgical strike. The scene cuts to a title card reading "Jai Hind".
2019	Boomerang	in a mid-credits scene, Plant seed.
2019	Captain Marvel	In a mid-credits scene, set in 2018, the activated pager (Note: As depicted in Avengers: Infinity War (2018)) is being monitored by the Avengers when Danvers appears looking for Nick Fury. (Note: This scene was directed by Avengers: Endgame (2019) directors Anthony and Joe Russo as a lead-in to that film.); In a post-credits scene, Goose climbs onto Nick Fury's desk and vomits the Tesseract.
2019	Dhilluku Dhuddu 2	The end credits show Viji and Maya's marriage.
2019	Captive State	During the credits, a map details that the Chicago Closed Zone was successfully destroyed, with other resistance strikes and protests having broken out in cities all over the world, indicating that the opening exhortation to "light a match and ignite a war" has led humanity to attempt to overthrow their alien oppressors.
2019	Gangs of Madras	the police are praised for their mission, and Deputy Commissioner Ramachandran helps Razia's sisters get jobs in the police department in return for the favour that she did to the police department.
2019	Batman vs. Teenage Mutant Ninja Turtles	Shredder emerges from the rubble of Ace Chemicals, now possessing a Joker-like appearance and laughing maniacally.
2019	The Hustle	A post-credits scene shows both women in one of their earlier Lord of the Rings con acts.
2019	Detective Pikachu	There are extra 8-bit Game Boy-style images of characters shown during the closing credits.
2019	Godzilla: King of the Monsters	During the end credits, news clippings and Monarch public files show that the Titans are healing Earth, a suspected second Mothra egg has been discovered, and some Titans are converging on Skull Island. Ancient cave paintings depict Godzilla and Kong-like Titans locked in battle. (Note: As depicted in Godzilla vs. Kong (2021)); In a post-credits scene, Jonah and his forces purchase Ghidorah's severed left head in Mexico.
2019	Toy Story 4	In the mid-credits scenes, one year has passed, and Bonnie entered first grade. At a newly built pier, Ducky and Bunny do one more version of their "plush rush" and spread laser eyes and superpowers, which Duke Caboom asks if they really can. At Bonnie's room, mirroring the scene where Woody introduces Forky, Jessie brings home a new friend Bonnie created: Karen Beverly, a decorated plastic knife. Instantly smitten, Forky offers to shepherd her in her journey through life as a toy instead of trash. When her first question is "How am I alive?", he is stumped, and all he could say was "I don't know."; In the post-credits scene, Duke Caboom jumps onto the 'I' of the Pixar logo, poses, and gives Combat Carl a high five.
2019	Descendants 3	Mal, Evie, Jay, and Carlos are seen looking at the Isle of the Lost; then racing across the bridge to their parents.
2019	Kee	In a post-credits scene, in New York, a masked person hacks Siddharth's phone and calls him, claiming that Shivam will not die as he is immortal.
2019	Watchman	In a mid-credits scene, "Toto Toto" is sung and featuring Sayyeshaa Saigal.
2019	Deerskin	In a mid-credits scene, Georges films himself with his jacket as he approaches a herd of deer. While Georges cannot see the image on the digital camcorder, it zooms in twice.
2019	Brightburn	Brandon, now identified as Brightburn, is seen from the perspective of news reports and eyewitness footage over the locations of various disasters, such as a building collapse and a wildfire. An online conspiracy theorist posts his own video analyzing the disasters and referencing attacks by other cryptids elsewhere in the world.
2019	Natpe Thunai	in a mid-credits scene, He comes to Prabha and blames the common people for voting leaders monetary benefits and questions Prabha if the people will elect a person who is doing good for them without any money, for which Prabha is unable to find an answer.
2019	Ishq	During the credits, multiple real-life instances of moral policing are shown.
2019	Spider-Man: Far From Home	In a doctored video, Mysterio frames Spider-Man for his murder and exposes his identity as Peter Parker to the world.; "Fury" and "Maria Hill" are revealed to be the Skrulls Talos and Soren in disguise, while the real Nick Fury is in outer space.
2019	Escape Plan: The Extractors	During the ending credits, Yung is revealed to have survived but heavily wounded. He is seen crawling and stumbling through the sewers and proceeds to escape by himself.
2019	Wonder Park	Over the scroll in the second half of the main-on-end credits, the Wonder-Chimps is shown in various costumes. At the end of the scroll, young June is shown on the floor.
2019	Thozhar Venkatesan	The end credits show many victims who have never gotten justice for losses caused by the government.
2019	Once Upon a Time in Hollywood	A post-credits scene shows Rick Dalton in his role of Jake Cahill doing a commercial for Red Apple cigarettes, a fictional brand created by Tarantino that appears in several of his movies.; A radio ad for Batman (1966) plays during the end credits.
2019	Mewtwo Strikes Back: Evolution	Mewtwo, Mew, and the cloned Pokémon fly together towards Mount Quena.
2019	Wonder Woman: Bloodlines	Diana returns to Washington and confronts Veronica Cale, who is revealed to be the true leader of Villany Inc. and vows revenge for thwarting her plan to seize the healing ray, to which Diana plants her sword into Cale's desk.
2019	Kadaram Kondan	In a mid-credits scene, on Vasu's daughter's birthday, Vasu and Aatirah discover that Vincent has been murdered under mysterious circumstances while on parole. They also receive a gift from KK – containing a necklace that Aatirah had once worn – implying that KK had murdered Vincent, thus getting his revenge.; During the credits, "Theesudar Kuniyuma" is sung and a collection from behind the scenes with Vikram is shown.
2019	Lego DC Batman: Family Matters	In a mid-credit scene, Billy Batson enters a subway station and finds a bizarre-looking train. The voice who helped him earlier tells him to board the train for the journey of a lifetime, to which he agrees.
2019	Poms	During the end credits, video clips show other people doing the same kind of dancing that Martha and the group have done.
2019	Ne Zha	In the mid- and post-credits scenes, the Dragon King vows vengeance on the citizens of Chentangguan for what happened to Ao Bing, while in an unknown location, Jiang Ziya is introduced.
2019	Hobbs & Shaw	In post-credits scenes, Hobbs brings his daughter to meet their extended family in Samoa; Deckard and Hattie are implied to bust their mother out of prison; and Hobbs receives a call from his partner, Locke, who has broken into a laboratory and discovered a more threatening virus. Hobbs also secretly has the London police set on Deckard in retaliation for the "Mike Oxmaul" prank, which Hobbs told the police that Deckard's name was "Hugh Janus".
2019	Bharat	In a mid-credits scene, he is shown marrying Kumud, finally deciding to move on with his life. in "Aithney Aa" is sung.
2019	Dora and the Lost City of Gold	During the first half of the credits at the high school dance, Dora and her friends sing "We Did It" as they celebrate their victory of finding Parapata, Alejandro remains a prisoner in Parapata for 1,000 years, and Cole and Elena stop Swiper from running away with their Inca item.; After the credits roll, the Fiesta Trio from the animated series enter and play their fanfare, take a bow, and leave.
2019	One Piece: Stampede	It is revealed to be Roger disapproved of his crew member making the Eternal Pose and threw it away, believing that the One Piece could not be obtained by someone who would rely on such a thing. Back in the present, everyone is shocked that Luffy destroyed the Eternal Pose, though Usopp is not surprised by his actions. Luffy states that if that they had taken it, they would have missed out on many great adventures.
2019	Aladdin	During the credits, are shown over the weddings of Aladdin with Jasmine and Genie with Dalia, where everyone dances to "Friend Like Me". This came from the Broadway performance of "Aladdin", which ends with the cast performing "Friend Like Me".
2019	Dharmaprabhu	A Collection of outtakes and during the ending credits.
2019	Battle at Big Rock	During the closing credits, found footage clips of dinosaurs and other creatures are shown including a pack of Compsognathus chasing after a scared little girl, a Stegosaurus causing a car to swerve and drive off a cliff, fishermen in a boat peacefully passing by a Parasaurolophus on the banks of a river, a Mosasaurus eating a great white shark after the shark eats a seal, and a Pteranodon swooping at a dove that had just been released at a wedding.
2019	Jackpot	In a post-credits scene, Akshaya, Mashaavani and Rahul Vijay.
2019	Mr. Local	In a post-credits scene, It is at this juncture that Keerthana realises that she too loves Mano. She returns to Chennai a few days later and accepts Mano's love.
2019	Abominable	The whooping snake appears after all the end-credits have rolled.
2019	No Safe Spaces	The director kills a cat, prompting a humorous remark from Dennis Prager.
2019	Comali	During the credits, Ravi learns his emotional outburst at Nikitha's house was filmed by Rithika and has gone viral across social media, earning him money to pay off Mani's debts. He does not sell the statue but retains it as a family heirloom and continues making YouTube videos on social issues. In the end, all debts have been repaid, and Rithika and Ravi are together.
2019	Zombieland: Double Tap	During the film's mid-credits scene fade back to 2009 via the start of the outbreak, Bill Murray witnesses Al Roker turn into a zombie during a promotional interview for a third Garfield film. He kills several zombies, including Grace Randolph and Lili Estefan, and escapes.; After the post-credits, an outtake is shown of Murray making Estefan break character by trying to cough up a hairball.
2019	Frozen 2	In a post-credits scene, Olaf visits Elsa's ice palace and recounts the events to Marshmallow, the snow giant created by Elsa as palace guard and the Snowgies, miniature snowmen inadvertently generated by Elsa on Anna's nineteenth birthday. (Note: As depicted in Frozen Fever (2015))
2019	Nerkonda Paarvai	In a post-credits scene, The case ends with Adhik and his friends getting arrested.
2019	Uglydolls	The credits show that several dolls have been matched to a human while a disgruntled Lou has been demoted to janitorial duty.; The gibberish cat comes out of the STX Films logo.
2019	A Shaun the Sheep Movie: Farmageddon	In a mid-credits scene, Shaun, Bitzer, and the flock play with a frisbee, while the Farmer tries out his new harvester; the frisbee gets caught in the harvester's machinery and causes it to explode.; In a post-credits scene, One of the hazmat-suited M.A.D. agents enters a black room with a keyboard. He then removes his suit and reveals himself to be Professor Brian Cox. He proceeds to play "Things Can Only Get Better" on the keyboard, only to be interrupted by Timmy, who unplugs the keyboard.
2019	Shazam!	In a mid-credits scene, the imprisoned Sivana is approached by a talking caterpillar, (Note: Identified off-screen as Mister Mind.) who proposes an alliance.; Shazam tries to speak to a goldfish.
2019	Pal Pal Dil Ke Paas	in the end credits, Karan and Saher are shown as a happily married couple.
2019	Kettyolaanu Ente Malakha	The credits roll by showing the clips of their honeymoon.
2019	Thadam	in a mid-credits scene, some of the investigating officers appear for a documentary shooting. One of the investigating officers calls the case unprecedented, before someone tells him similar cases occurred in other countries as well.
2019	The Two Popes	The Two Popes watching the 2014 FIFA World Cup Final.
2019	Kaappaan	In a post-credits scene, Kathir and Anjali have romantic moments in his hometown and "Kurile Kurile" is sung.
2019	Teen Titans Go! vs. Teen Titans	In a mid-credit scene, the 2013 Titans relax at their headquarters, ignoring Darkseid's attack on Jump City.
2019	Lucifer	In the mid-credits scene, Stephen meets Zayed and his gang in a remote location in Russia and attends a phone call of a gold-diamond trafficker Sanghani, to whom he reveals himself as Khureshi-Ab'ram. Headlines of various international newspapers are shown reporting Ab'ram as the head of an unnamed crime syndicate.
2019	Lucky Day	it is revealed Red is still in his prison cell, looking at a picture of Chloe. He then starts to pace back and forth in the small cell, leaving it up to the audience to imagine if the entirety of the film has been a dream.
2019	De De Pyaar De	In the mid-credits scene, the two argue on whether they should meet Ayesha's family.; Second in the mid-credits scene, "Hauli Hauli" is sung.
2019	Playmobil: The Movie	In a mid-credits scene, one of the security guards finds a figure of Maximus on the floor next to a cage. As he places him on top of Mount Olympus, Maximus's laugh is heard.
2019	The Secret Life of Pets 2	Snowball raps about Panda until his owner returns.; Rooster says "Okay, Moment's over."
2019	Nani's Gang Leader	In a post-credits scene, "Gang-U Leader" is sung and featuring Anirudh Ravichander.
2019	Black Christmas	The cat that was the pet of the MKE sisters is seen licking the black liquid of the AKO.
2019	Adithya Varma	During the credits, She tells Adhi that he is the child's father, and they reunite. The pair marries, and Meera's father apologises for misunderstanding their love for each other.
2019	Spies in Disguise	A video-game retro version of Walter Beckett and Lance Sterling as a pigeon appears at the end of the credits, with a shared thought bubble reading "WE DID IT!" as fireworks explode.
2019	Charlie's Angels	Elena receives her Angels tattoo and congratulations from Charlie in presence of Sabina, Jane and The Saint.
2019	Jumanji: The Next Level	The heating mechanic Spencer's mother hired finally shows up, only to be drawn to the game, while at the diner, Spencer and the others are surprised to witness a flock of ostriches rush past the diner.; At the end of credits, there is the sound of drums, followed by the croak of an ostrich.
2019	Sye Raa Narasimha Reddy	As the credits roll, Mahatma Gandhi with an Indian flag is shown and patroic singing is heard.
2019	Mathu Vadalara	Shows Abhi in Jail, as a reference to Hollywood movies having a post-credits scene. This is the first Telugu movie to feature a post-credits scene.
2019	Notebook	in a mid-credits scene, it is shown that Firdaus sent the children back home so that she can talk and spend time with Kabir with whom she has fallen in love.
2019	Zombie	In a mid-credits scene, Driving in the Car and during the credits.
2019	Pailwaan	In a mid-credits scene, Kichcha now sets out to fulfill Sarkar's dream by entering a national level wrestling match representing India.
2019	Petromax	In a first post-credits scene, When Senthil and his friends leave the house, they find a bag filled with cash in Saravanan's car. They converted the house into a retirement home. They live happily with Kamala, who recovered from amnesia, and other old pensioners, abandoned by their children in "Malarudhu Pudhu Naale" is sung.; In a second post-credits scene, Amma walking is her family Meera and winks fades and white.
2019	Storm Boy	The scene shows the young Storm Boy (Mike) running up a sand dune towards a rainbow.
2019	Devi 2	In a post-credits scenes, Where Devi still has Ruby's nameplate. This scene sets the stage for the future sequel.
2019	Charlie Chaplin 2	Outtakes and bloopers in the film are shown during the credits.
2019	Hellboy	In a mid-credits scene, Hellboy is consoled at Trevor Bruttenholm's grave by the ghost of his hero Lobster Johnson.; In a post-credits scene, Baba Yaga enlists an unseen force to seek out Hellboy with the promise of allowing him to finally die.
2019	Countdown	In a mid-credits scene, Derek is on a Tinder date when his Countdown app causes the lights in the restaurant to go out and he is attacked by Ozhin.
2019	Dear Comrade	In a post-credits scene, Bobby drops Lilly at the National Cricket Academy and gives her a fist-bump reaffirming that she is his true comrade.
2019	100	In the mid-credits scene, Sathya receives a call and walks away to solve a crime.
2019	Namma Veettu Pillai	In a mid-credits scene, it is intended that Arumpon, Thulasi, and his mother have reconciled with the rest of the extended family. Ayyanar has been released on parole to attend Thulasi's Seemantham and it is revealed that he made peace with Arumpon. The film ends comically with Arumpon breaking the fourth wall mimicking his grandfather.
2019	Bigil	In a post-credits scene, The match turns out to be a thriller with Tamil Nadu winning the Championship through a penalty shootout. Michael and the team dedicate their success to Kathir, who is watching the match from the dugout in a wheelchair. Michael gets Sharma exposed for drug possession, leading to Sharma's arrest and subsequent execution in Malaysia, where he is on a holiday.; In a second post-credits scene, Michael takes up football coaching for children, with one of his students being Daniel's son, who have now made peace with Michael. Michael takes Daniel's son under his wing and ask him who is your favourite football player Messi or Ronaldo where he happily replies Bigil.
2019	Action	In a post-credits scene, During the posthumous honouring of Saravanan, more conspirators including Saravanan's senior and ex-PM candidate Varma are arrested and it is also revealed that Subhash killed Malik during a staged escape.
2019	Jay and Silent Bob Reboot	In a mid-credits scene, there are several outtakes and few additional scenes appears after the movie ends.; In a post-credits scene, Jay tells Milly that for the past twenty-five years, he and Bob have been pranking Dante by jamming gum in the locks.
2019	iSmart Shankar	In a mid-credit-scene, Sara and Arun leave for a holiday in Hong Kong on 14 February.
2019	Missing Link	The end credits reveal maps and souvenirs of the subsequent adventures of Susan and Lionel.
2019	Midway	During the credits, "Microphone Annie Trousseau" and "All or Nothing at All" are sung.
2019	Playing with Fire	A collection of outtakes and during the end credits.
2019	Avane Srimannarayana	First during the credits, Jayaram fights Narayana in rage but is overpowered. Narayana evacuates the troupe and Jayaram is killed in the fire. Narayana is praised as a hero for his actions and eventually falls for Lakshmi, leading to their marriage.; Second during the credits, Harishchandra meets Narayana's long lost father.
2019	Dabangg 3	During the credits, Chulbul receives a call from Prajapati, who tells him that Rajjo hasn't arrived home. Sensing Bali's hand in the matter, he invades a quarry where Bali has held Rajjo, and surprisingly, Makkhi himself, as hostages – Makkhi was always on Chulbul's side, and it was a game by the brothers to incense Bali; after an intense fight, Chulbul kills Bali by impaling him on a metal spike. He then buries Bali in the rubble in "Pandey Kallene Theko" is sung.
2019	Hero	In a post-credits scene, it is also revealed that Sathyamoorthy is alive and is helping Sakthi in his missions.
2019	A Beautiful Day in the Neighborhood	There are various clips of the crew building models used in this film. During which, Mr. Rogers sings "You've Got to Do It", ending with footage of him finishing singing the song.
2019	War	In a mid-credits scene, Kabir and Ruhi surf together at Bondi Beach in Sydney, fulfilling Naina's wish of surfing with her, while Luthra calls him to complete an incomplete mission of killing Haqqani.
2019	Aruvam	In a mid-credits scene, with a note: "Jagan's hunt will continue", indicating a sequel.
2019	Horrible Histories: The Movie – Rotten Romans	Rattus Rattus appears several times during the credits.: The first time is to complain about all the names, which sends him to sleep.; The second is to remind viewers about how everything in Horrible Histories is 100% 'Accu-Rat'. Though, he does state that historians never agreed on how Boudica died, and invites the audience to make their own minds up.; The third time has him drag in a bunch of cinema snacks, thanking whoever was sitting in the seat he stole them from.; The fourth time he comes up, covered in bubblegum, to talk about what he calls a 'soppy song', which then plays.; The fifth, sixth and seventh time has him dance to said song.; The eighth and final time has him pop up to say the movie is over. But he does say to the audience that he'll see them at the Oscars.
2019	Knives Out	At the end of the credits there is a faint sound of dogs barking.
2019	The Banana Splits Movie	There are two scenes during the scrolling credits: The first is of a modernized version of the Banana Splits intro, but, when with Fall Out Boy's Patrick Stump doing the vocals. He ends it by saying "We've killed so many people..."; The second has a rat run past a finger.
2019	Jexi	During the first minute of the end credits, there is a brief montage of Phil's old boss Kai getting a new phone and getting to know Jexi the Same way Phil did.
2019	Inside Man: Most Wanted	A disguised Ariella enters a bar in Berlin to shoot Dietrich's men, avenging her brother's death.

== See also ==
- List of films with post-credits scenes (before 2000)
- List of films with post-credits scenes (2000s)
- List of films with post-credits scenes (2020s)
- Mid-credits and post-credits scenes in the Marvel Cinematic Universe
