= List of films with post-credits scenes (2000s) =

Many films have featured mid- and post-credits scenes. Such scenes often include comedic gags, plot revelations, outtakes, or hints about sequels.

== 2000s ==
Year	Title	Description of scene(s)
2000	The Tigger Movie	E.H. Shepard illustrations are shown throughout the credits.
2000	High Fidelity	The sound a record gives off when it's reached the end grooves can be heard.
2000	The Road to El Dorado	Bibo the armadillo appears under the "Directed By" credit, pursuing two butterflies catching one, then eating it.
2000	Big Momma's House	The final scene in the church is continued over the cast credits, with Big Momma singing.
2000	Chicken Run	Continued conversation between the two rats about the chicken and the egg off-screen.
2000	Me, Myself, and Irene	Cam Neely, Brendan Shanahan, and Anna Kournikova make cameos.; Photos of extras are also shown.; A search is shown for the missing thumb and also the wounded cow is shown.
2000	Scary Movie	Shorty steals stuff from a variety store.; Doofy breaks and makes up with his vacuum cleaner.
2000	Bring it On	Outtakes are shown along with the cast lip-syncing to the song "Mickey".
2000	Rugrats in Paris: The Movie	During the first half, photos of Spike and Fifi wreaking havoc in Paris is shown.
2000	28 Days	In a mid-credits scene, Eddie recognizes an actor from Santa Cruz who arrives as a new patient.
2000	Ratcatcher	The closing credits play, showing James drowning in slow motion in the murky canal water.
2000	Scooby-Doo and the Alien Invaders	Scooby-Doo was seen scaring the audience with an alien costume.
2000	Charlie's Angels	Outtakes run before the scrolling credits.
2000	Blue's Big Musical Movie	At the end of the closing credits, the words "Bye-bye" appear on-screen as Blue barks and waves goodbye to the audience.
2000	Hey Ram	Gandhi's great-grandson Tushar Gandhi comes over and visits Ram Jr's private room, which is full of historical photos. Ram Jr hands over Gandhi's footwear and spectacles which his grandfather had previously collected from the place of the shootout and had treasured throughout his life.
2000	Fantasia 2000	During the first half of the closing credits, the music orchestra leaves as well as scenes from the movie flying off into outer space.
2000	Dude, Where's My Car?	The woman from the drive-thru asks, "And then?"
2001	Home Movie	In a mid-credits scene, the helm of a knight's suit of armor opens electronically, revealing a skull inside whose eyes begin glowing red. Chris Smith asks, "Is that everything?" Ben Skora responds, "Yeah, that's it."; In a post-credits scene, Ben Skora walks through his circular dilating door, and it closes electronically behind him.
2001	Waking Life	Clips are shown along with the cast names.
2001	Donnie Darko	A picture of Frank is shown.
2001	Hannibal	Hannibal Lecter is heard saying "Ta ta, H.", the closing line of the post-script in his letter to Clarice Starling.
2001	Monkeybone	An animated tin toy blows horn that reveals banner reading "The End" before flying away.
2001	Spy Kids	After the credits, Castle Floop is shown.
2001	Tomcats	A collection of bloopers and outtakes runs during the end credits.
2001	Josie and the Pussycats	The movie phone guy says "Jerken".
2001	Bridget Jones's Diary	Home movies of young Bridget and Mark at the birthday party that he mentioned earlier are shown.
2001	Dil Chahta Hai	As credits roll, he is shown enjoying a lively restaurant dinner with her and his friends.
2001	Freddy Got Fingered	Drew Barrymore kisses Tom Green.
2001	Aalavandhan	During the credits, "Kadavul Paadhi" is sung dancing and raining.
2001	A Knight's Tale	The four main characters are shown having a farting contest.
2001	Moulin Rouge!	Credits are printed on a physical roll of paper. The title scene message is displayed, "this story is about truth, beauty, freedom, but above all, love."
2001	Scooby-Doo and the Cyber Chase	The gang tells the viewers about their favorite scenes in the movie.
2001	The Accidental Spy	Yuen, now officially a spy, delivers a briefcase to a drug dealer in Italy and tips off the police to arrest him.
2001	Evolution	The three guys appear in an ad for Head and Shoulders shampoo.
2001	Shahjahan	During the credits, offers his unwavering assistance, embodying the timeless adage that true love knows no bounds, even in the face of personal anguish and sacrifice.
2001	Jeepers Creepers	As the sun just rose on the Florida countryside, the creeper truck honks, as he rides the truck for another set of human body parts.
2001	The Fast and the Furious	Dominic is seen driving through Baja California, in a 1970 Chevrolet Chevelle SS.
2001	Shaolin Soccer	A collection of bloopers and outtakes is shown directly before the credits.
2001	Son of the Bride	Rafael and Juan Carlos are watching an adult movie starring Dick Watson.
2001	Wet Hot American Summer	The counsellors reunite 10 years later.
2001	The Princess Diaries	Mia tries to kick a soccer ball but misses and falls down.
2001	Rush Hour 2	A collection of bloopers and outtakes runs during the credits.
2001	Rat Race	Smash Mouth performs "All Star" while the cast dance on stage, stage dive, and crowd surf.
2001	Jay and Silent Bob Strike Back	God from Kevin Smith's previous film, Dogma, closes a book labeled "Askewniverse" which is the fictional universe that many of Kevin Smith's movies take place in.
2001	Get Over It	Sisqó and Vitamin C singing and dancing along with the cast to the song "September" as the credits roll.
2001	K-PAX	Dr. Mark Powell looks through the lens of his telescope as if he is looking for the stars of K-PAX.
2001	Shallow Hal	Behind-the-scenes shots of various crew members are shown.; Walt puts on skis.
2001	Ghost World	An alternative version of the fight between Seymour and Doug, which Seymour wins.
2001	Monsters, Inc.	A collection of fake outtakes similar to A Bug's Life and Toy Story 2. One of them features Rex from the Toy Story series in place of the enormous monster Ted.; Having covered up their attempts to hide Boo earlier in the movie by pretending they were rehearsing for a musical called “Put That Thing Back Where It Came From Or So Help Me”, Mike and Sully stage an actual musical loosely based on the events of the film.
2001	Jimmy Neutron: Boy Genius	Ms. Winifred Fowl is seen in ant size riding on an apple worm named Mr. Wiggles on her way to the cafeteria in the elementary school hall.
2001	3000 Miles to Graceland	The first scene has Michael Zane singing an Elvis song. There are some random scenes from the movie, Vegas, and other characters from the film. Near the end of the credits, there is a blooper scene between Kurt Russell and Kevin Costner.
2002	Return to Neverland	The end credits appear on a Neverland map and later feature some Neverland objects.
2002	Super Troopers	Footage from Farva's patrol car is shown from the "school bus incident" that put him on radio duty.; A take of Farva throwing up in the toilet is shown as a blooper.
2002	My Big Fat Greek Wedding	Toula and Ian are shown walking their daughter to Greek school while her dad waxes his car.
2002	Spider-Man	The sound of Green Goblin's laugh is heard. Only seen on 35mm open-matte film scan prints.
2002	The Importance of Being Earnest	As the credits begin, two silent scenes are shown as music plays. The first shows the characters attending a funeral for "Bunbury" and the second shows Gwendolen holding Jack's hand as he receives a tattoo on his rear end.
2002	Scooby-Doo	Scooby-Doo and Shaggy eat peppers and burn their mouths.
2002	Lilo & Stitch	Photographs of characters are shown while "Burning Love" plays.
2002	The Country Bears	The cops who exited the car wash explain they have a police car and one of them explains about keeping the moustache and they get into their car which pours out a lot of soapy water.
2002	Austin Powers in Goldmember	As the credits are rolling, various outtakes of Ozzy Osbourne attempting to deliver his line are shown.; In a second mid-credits scene, Britney Spears asks Mini-Me if it's true what she heard about him. He whispers in her ear, and she says, "Kickstand? Really? Um, can I give you my cell phone number? Please?" Mini-Me smiles at the camera.; In a third mid-credits scene, Burt Bacharach sings "What the World Needs Right Now" as various clips from the film are shown.
2002	Hathyar	a note on the irony of destiny as the credits roll.
2002	The Master of Disguise	After the credits, Pistachio and the Slapping-Dummy Man have a drink as they make remarks to the emptying theater.
2002	The Crocodile Hunter: Collision Course	A collection of outtakes and bloopers runs during the end credits featuring Steve Irwin.
2002	Spy Kids 2: The Island of Lost Dreams	Carmen performs as a pop star as part of an undercover assignment.; The inside of Carmen and Juni's treehouse is shown.
2002	It's a Very Merry Muppet Christmas Movie	The Muppets sing "We Wish You a Merry Christmas" outside.
2002	Cabin Fever	A truck driver drinks homemade lemonade from the stand in front of the general store as health alerts about the virus are being posted and handed out. He then climbs into a Down Home Spring Water truck and drives away.
2002	Mike's New Car	Mike reminisces about his old car before agreeing to walk to work with Sulley.
2002	Jackass: The Movie	The guys do one last stunt while wearing old-age makeup. This would later inspire the Bad Grandpa spin-off.
2002	Men with Brooms	A collection of bloopers and outtakes during the end credits.
2002	The Santa Clause 2	Elves hammer some of the credits, while Carol is shown dancing as Mrs. Claus.
2002	Santa vs. the Snowman 3D	A collection of fake bloopers.
2002	Kung Pow! Enter the Fist	A collection of outtakes and bloopers runs during the end credits.; Master Tang, who has been left behind, asks someone to help him from a hungry golden eagle eating his leg.
2002	Harry Potter and the Chamber of Secrets	Gilderoy Lockhart's new book Who Am I? – referring to the character's memory loss as depicted in the film – is shown in a bookstore in Diagon Alley.
2002	Manmadhudu	In a mid-credits scene, during their first night together, Harika recalls realising their connection when Abhiram's lipstick ad concept matched hers. Abhiram admits he had placed a bug under her desk to steal her idea. Harika playfully scolds him and gives him a lighthearted punch.
2002	Catch Me If You Can	Typewriters can be heard.
2002	Baba	In a post-credits scene, Upon learning of the murder, Baba turns back, abandoning his plan to live in the Himalayas, and returns to Tamil Nadu to confront the evil forces.; The film ends with the screen displaying "To be continued..."
2002	25th Hour	A dog barks and growls during the Touchstone Pictures logo.
2003	Daredevil	Bullseye, having been moved to a prison hospital and severely bandaged after his confrontation with Matt, is shown to still have his perfect aim after he impales a fly with a syringe needle and says "Bullseye".
2003	Piglet's Big Movie	A video featuring Carly Simon singing "With a Few Good Friends" and clips from the movie plays alongside the credits.
2003	Holes	Zero/Hector repeats the lines of Madame Zeroni's curse.
2003	The Matrix Reloaded	A trailer for the sequel, The Matrix Revolutions, is shown.
2003	Bruce Almighty	A collection of bloopers and outtakes from the film, similar to Liar Liar.
2003	2 Fast 2 Furious	A CGI animation of cars racing around Miami.
2003	Battle Royale II: Requiem	A voice-over reads a letter written by a 10-year-old boy from Afghanistan wondering what peace is like.
2003	Charlie's Angels: Full Throttle	The angels giggle as they walk through sprinklers.
2003	Bad Boys II	The two main characters lie in a pool and discuss their personal lives and relationships after defeating the bad guys.
2003	Spy Kids 3-D: Game Over	Daryl Sabara and Alexa Vega's audition tapes from the first Spy Kids film are shown.
2003	Freaky Friday	Lindsay Lohan's band in the film performs a song at her mother's wedding.
2003	Old School	Mark drives off a bridge and lands on a fly-fishing Pritchard as the car explodes. Frank meets Heidi, who invites him to a "get-together," and he enthusiastically accepts.
2003	School of Rock	The band performs a song that contains lyrics about the film credits.
2003	The Triplets of Belleville	In a humorous post-credits scene, the boatman who rented Souza the pedalo is seen patiently waiting for his vessel to return.
2003	George of the Jungle 2	Before the credits come to a conclusion, the narrator feels so sad about the ending of the movie and tells the audience to go home, just a female narrator cheers him up.
2003	Alaudin	In a mid-credits scene, Chinnasamy, Munusamy and Alaudin crowd children.
2003	101 Dalmatians II: Patch's London Adventure	The scene shows Thunderbolt in his TV show, with Patch and the other Dalmatians watching and afterwards they pursued the bandit into the sunset.
2003	Finding Nemo	After the first part of the credits, back at the dental office in Sydney, the dentist frustratingly curses the new high-tech filter, which has suddenly stopped working despite having a maintenance-free lifetime guarantee. He complains about having to clean the fish tank himself and put all the fish in bags but notices that they have mysteriously vanished from the counter. Horns honk out the open window as Peach is the last to cross the street and land herself in the harbor with the other fish. As they float in their baggies, unable to escape confinement, Bloat asks, "Now what?"; In a post-credits scene, the tiny fish that was Chum's "friend" at the support group is stalked by the anglerfish. As the anglerfish moves in to swallow him, the tiny fish suddenly opens his enormous mouth and devours the angler.
2003	Thiruda Thirudi	During the credits, Viji falls in love with Vasu, but he acts to hate her because she made him and his whole family separated. So in the middle, something happens, and they both end up loving each other. Vasu also reunited with his family after a couple of twists.
2003	Inspector Gadget 2	A cartoon iris appears and Brain, wearing Baxter's "Bark Translator", quacks three times.
2003	Exploring the Reef with Jean-Michel Cousteau	In a before-credits scene, Nemo tells the viewers about Jean-Michel Cousteau's website: oceanfutures.org
2003	Anbe Sivam	During the credits, Sivam assents and walks away.
2003	Love Actually	Scenes of loved ones greeting one another are shown between credit groupings.
2003	Save the Green Planet!	The credits show a video diary from Byeong-gu’s life, highlighting fleeting moments of happiness with his parents and Su-ni.
2003	Stitch! The Movie	Jumba and Pleakley were about to reenter Grand Councilwoman's ship but as she heard what they said she takes off back into space.
2003	Looney Tunes: Back in Action	Daffy Duck gets pursued by Nasty Canasta and Cottontail Smith at the casino and pulls the slot machine lever before running off. Nasty and Cottontail prepare for money to come out of the machine, but the machine lands on a bomb and it explodes, knocking them both unconscious.
2003	The Haunted Mansion	A spooky message from the gypsy fortune teller.
2003	Brother Bear	In a series of mid-credit scenes, Kenai and Koda are shown taking part in various activities together, including cave wall arts. Before the final ending with Disney logo, Koda breaks the fourth wall.; In a post-credits scene, he tells the viewers that according to the federal and state wildlife regulations, "no fish were harmed during the making of this film," referencing the American Humane Association warning, "No animals were harmed in the making of this film." However, he is proven wrong. An adult bear is seen chasing a salmon, the latter crying for help as the bear attempts to eat the salmon. Koda uses a gesture for cutting the camera, and tells the cameraman "Cut!", but the camera keeps rolling. He sees that the bear catching the salmon, and Koda covers the lens with his paws, so that the audience can't see the bear eating the salmon. The bear is heard belching. The scene ends.
2003	Peter Pan	Tinker Bell says "Bye-bye!"
2003	Chalte Chalte	They continue to argue as the credits roll.
2003	Godzilla: Tokyo S.O.S.	Biotechnology lab shown with collection of Godzilla DNA.
2003	Pirates of the Caribbean: The Curse of the Black Pearl	Jack the Monkey takes a coin from the treasure and is affected by the curse.
2003	Johnny English	About a minute into the credits, Countess Alexandra falls from the sky into a swimming pool.
2004	Napoleon Dynamite	Kip and LaFawnduh are married in an outdoor ceremony in Preston.
2004	Miracle	During the closing credits, each actor is shown on screen with the name of the player he portrayed along with a "where are they now" update.
2004	Protégé de la Rose Noire	A collection of bloopers and outtakes runs during the credits.
2004	Dawn of the Dead	Video camera footage of the survivors after they escaped on Steve's boat.
2004	Scooby-Doo 2: Monsters Unleashed	During the credits, Velma finally dates Patrick, Shaggy and Scooby regain their self-confidence and they all celebrate their victory at the Faux Ghost.; Scooby-Doo is in the mansion playing his game on his Game Boy Advance. Then, he tells the audience that there is a secret code for the game. Said code unlocks an alternate ending for the game.
2004	Hellboy	While filming a scene, Guillermo del Toro, the director, leaves the room, radioing in because the room was "spooky".
2004	Madhoshi	She puts her head on Arpit's shoulders and credits roll.
2004	Kill Bill: Vol. 2	A blooper of The Bride tearing out the eyeball of one of the Crazy 88s.
2004	Udhaya	Udhaya is arrested and tried in court, where he pleads not guilty and is released, embracing Vasanthi as the credits roll in "Udaya Udaya" is sung.
2004	Shrek 2	After Donkey and Puss in Boots end their concert, Dragon appears flying in the sky, lands near Donkey and reveals that she has given birth to donkey-dragon hybrids. As he is shown enjoying the news, the scene cuts to black and Donkey declares, "I gotta get a job!"
2004	Virumaandi	During the credits, on TV, pleas for a quick judgement, either to reach Annalakshmi by hanging to death or to live life as a silent man, seeking retribution.
2004	Childstar	The audio from the film (called "The First Son") that they are making within this movie plays over the end credits.
2004	DodgeBall: A True Underdog Story	During the credits, Peter advertises youth dodgeball classes at a newly renovated and popular Average Joe's.; In a post-credits scene, White Goodman complains about how the American public cannot deal with movies that lack happy endings before performing a dance to Kelis' "Milkshake".
2004	Anchorman: The Legend of Ron Burgundy	Ron and his team laugh awkwardly about their success before they all fall silent and abruptly walk away.
2004	M. Kumaran Son of Mahalakshmi	In a mid-credits scene, Kumaran sees a final apparition of his mother looking at him proudly and waving goodbye.
2004	Fat Albert	Before the ending credits start, Fat Albert encourages the audience to finish watching the credits and help each other.
2004	Dhoom	As the credits roll, "Dhoom Dhoom" by Tata Young (item number) music video plays, with actors: Abishek Bachchan, Uday Chopra, Rimi Sen, and John Abraham.
2004	7G Rainbow Colony	In a mid-credits scene, Kadhir talking to himself at the beach, thinking that he is talking to Anitha.
2004	Ishq Hai Tumse	In a post-credits scene, Arjun and Khushbu are shown several years later as a married couple with two children, a boy and a girl.
2004	Starsky & Hutch	The two partners roll out on another case in their new ride, driving triumphantly through the L.A. River as the credits roll.
2004	Born to Fight	Behind-the-scenes shots of some of the many dangerous stunts play during the credits.
2004	Aabra Ka Daabra	In a post-credits scene, a purple skull bat.
2004	The Football Factory	In a pre-credits slideshow, Tommy is shown to have since moved on to watching Rugby. However, this is only a joke and he has not actually started to watch rugby.
2004	Lakshya	In the midst of credits, Colonel Damle, Lieutenant Colonel Pradeep, and Subedar Major Pritam Singh pay their respects to all the martyrs of Operation Vijay.
2004	The Princess Diaries 2: The Royal Engagement	Hector Elizondo is doing an ad for a trip to Genovia.
2004	MXP: Most Xtreme Primate	During the credits, a collection of outtakes is shown and Little Bobby sings.; In a post-credits scene, there is drinking and a chimpanzee.
2004	The Last Shot	Steven is shown with a new deaf girlfriend who cannot hear all dogs barking, solving the barking dog problem.
2004	Shark Tale	Lola tries to find Oscar to make amends. All she finds is a hermit crab named Crazy Joe.; During the end credits, Crazy Joe taps on Head of Artistic Development Frank Gladstone's name and yells out, "What?! You see this guy?! He hardly worked on the movie at all! Always on the phone, yakking yakking yakking!", and after that, Crazy Joe said "Did somebody say crazy?!"; Mrs. Sanchez leaning out her window and telling everyone to go home because it's past their bedtime.
2004	The SpongeBob SquarePants Movie	The theater crew women asks the pirates to leave the theater room.
2004	Jana	In a mid-credits scene, "Pothuva Palaruku" is sung.
2004	Khakee	He then calls headquarters, informing them that Aangre has been fatally wounded while trying to escape from custody, despite warning" while Aangre eventually succumbs to his wounds, as the credits roll.
2004	Raise Your Voice	Over the end credits, the students perform together.
2004	Meet the Fockers	Jack watches hidden camera footages.
2005	The Magic Roundabout	In the mid-credits scene, Zeebad wakes up to find himself back in his prison once again, which to his chagrin, is a molten lava cave far underground.; In a post-credits scene, Zebedee tells the audience that they're still here and tells the audience that it's time for bed.
2005	Kronk's New Groove	Photos reveal that Kronk and Birdwell have been married, and continue to show what they and the others from the film have been up to.
2005	The Producers	The cast sings "Goodbye!", telling the audience to leave the theater.
2005	Constantine	John leaves his lighter on Chas Kramer's grave stating "You did good, kid."
2005	The Hitchhiker's Guide to the Galaxy	The Narrator continues a bit more to the story halfway through the credits.
2005	The Myth	Bloopers, outtakes, and behind-the-scenes footage are shown throughout the end credits.
2005	House of the Dead 2	The infected Professor Roy Curien is seen breathing heavily and looking frantically around.
2005	The Cutting Room	Ed is seen about to kill a female lead in his film.
2005	The Honeymooners	Ed and Ralph claim to be famous singers.
2005	Madagascar	The whole cast sings "I Like to Move It".; A green version of Gloria with a crown, resembling the Statue of Liberty, appears during the credits, and stars appear breaking the screen.
2005	Bunty Aur Babli	"BnB" plays with guest actor, Amitabh Bachchan as the credits roll, with heart in fire at the end of the song.
2005	Midsummer Dream	The instruments play and sing the "Tiempo" song.
2005	Salaam Namaste	A collection of outtakes and bloopers runs during the end credits with "Salaam Namaste (Dhol Mix)" playing as the background music.
2005	Pooh's Heffalump Movie	During the first half of the end credits Lumpy does fun activities with Winnie the Pooh and the others and meets Christopher Robin.
2005	Wallace & Gromit: The Curse of the Were-Rabbit	The title "We would like to stress that no animals were harmed during the making of this motion picture" is shown during the credits. A rabbit bounces and falls across the screen and then starts to scream.
2005	The Baxter	Dan reflects in narration on his own status as a Baxter, having just lost the girl to the leading man.
2005	Ullam Ketkumae	During the credits, Shyam accepts Pooja's love for him.
2005	One Man Band	In a post-credits scene, it is nighttime, with Treble standing on Bass, trying to reach the coins. As they start to fall backward, the short film ends.
2005	The Ringer	In a mid-credits scene, Steve and his friends dance onstage with the Kids of Widney High as they perform the song "Respect".
2005	Yakeen	The end credits begin over footage of Kabir explaining his story and confessing the truth to the police officers.
2005	Just Friends	She calls the boy who gave her a cookie her friend, which he replies with "the bestest" before realizing he has been put in the friend zone.
2005	Bob the Butler	During the credits, Little Boy, Anne Jamieson, Bob Tree and Dinner self.
2005	Kids in America	Holden and Charlotte kiss for 6 minutes breaking the record for longest kiss in a movie.
2005	Chicken Little	The start of the end credits features the characters singing "Don't Go Breaking My Heart".; (3-D version only) At the end, Buck and Chicken Little appear, looking out at the audience, saying goodbye. Chicken Little says "Think we can get some popcorn when they leave?" and Buck points out of the screen and says "Yeah, there's some on the floor" and Chicken Little replied, "I don't mind, I'm starving."
2005	Stealth	In the debris-strewn border between North and South Korea, EDI's "brain" is seen turning back on.
2005	Diary of a Mad Black Woman	A collection of outtakes and bloopers runs during the end credits.
2005	Waiting	Dan arrives at the home of the customer whom Dean had insulted earlier, incorrectly believing it to be the party's location. The customer angrily demands the gift certificates he was promised earlier from Dan.
2005	Pride and Prejudice	Keira Knightley's Elizabeth Bennet kissing her Mr. Darcy in a moonlit haze as he repeatedly sighs her name.
2005	Kanda Naal Mudhal	During the credits, with happy note as Ramya and Krishna marry, while Aravind starts a wordy fight with a young girl. There too two children fight.
2005	The Chronicles of Narnia: The Lion, the Witch and the Wardrobe	Lucy tries to go back to Narnia through the Wardrobe and Professor Kirke tells her she will see Narnia again when they least expect it. After Lucy and Kirke leave, the Wardrobe opens on its own, with light appearing from inside it, and Aslan's roar is heard.
2005	Final Fantasy VII: Advent Children	The movie ends on a shot of a desk with flowers on it. The shot zooms in to show that the pictures are of the main party members in Final Fantasy VII, as well as the new characters added in the movie.
2006	High School Musical	During the credits, both teams win their respective competitions, and the entire school gathers in the gym to celebrate (reprise of "We're All in This Together"). Chad asks Taylor out, and Sharpay makes a truce with Gabriella.; In a post-credits scene, Zeke Baylor paces alone in the gym, when Sharpay runs in, declaring that the cookies he had given her that she had initially rejected are "genius". She hugs him, and he says he will make here a crème brûlée. Zeke smiles in victory.
2006	Crank	The film re-imagined as a 2-D action video game.
2006	Over the Hedge	RJ is seen demonstrating to his new family how to operate/hack the same vending machine shown at the beginning of the film to deliver all the food products. Unfortunately, his efforts at obtaining the product are stifled by the now products blocking the access door.
2006	Family	Aryan managing Shekhar's canteen with his friends, as the end credits roll.
2006	Slither	A cat approaches Grant's remains and becomes infected by the alien parasite.
2006	X-Men: The Last Stand	Professor X is shown to be alive after his apparent death by the hands of the Phoenix.
2006	Cars	An epilogue showing the changes done in Radiator Springs, along with a drive-in theater showcasing parodies of Toy Story, Monsters, Inc. and A Bug's Life.; Van and Minny, a couple of travelers who were trying to find the Interstate from the earlier movie scene in Radiator Springs, are shown lost in the middle of the desert.
2006	Pirates of the Caribbean: Dead Man's Chest	The Pelegostos now revere the dog as a god.
2006	Clerks II	Near the end of the credits there are messages like "How's my driving?", "Christ, I spend too much time on the internet..."; At the end of the credits, "Jay and Silent Bob might return one day" appears.; Sexy Stud says, "Oh sh*t, gotta finish. Hey!"; The animated View Askew logo is seen with Jay and Silent Bob, after which a list of Clerks II MySpace friends is shown.
2006	You, Me and Dupree	Lance Armstrong is reading Dupree's book.
2006	John Tucker Must Die	School girls in Tokyo are laughing at John Tucker's thong pictures.
2006	Zoom	Bloopers and outtakes appear in the closing credits.
2006	Talladega Nights: The Ballad of Ricky Bobby	A collection of outtakes and bloopers runs during the end credits.; In a post-credits scene, Walker and Texas Ranger are seen reading Faulkner with their grandmother.
2006	Like Mike 2: Streetball	In a post-credits scene, Ray then screams from the trunk, which ends up getting towed, and the shoes are hung up on a street light.
2006	Outsourced	Right afterwards, he gets a phone call from Asha just as the screen turns black and the end credits roll.
2006	Jackass Number Two	As the credits roll, Rip Taylor appears to end the movie much like in the predecessor.
2006	RV	During the credits, the two families are shown dancing to and singing "Route 66".
2006	Lifted	As the end credits run, the sound of Ernie's alarm clock is heard, followed by his yawn, a Wilhelm scream, and a crash sound while falling into the crater.
2006	Inland Empire	In a post-credits scene, a celebration involving the troupe of prostitutes, a one-legged woman mentioned earlier, Niko and her pet monkey, and others. The women dance to Nina Simone's "Sinnerman", while a lumberjack saws a log.
2006	Failure to Launch	This fades into the closing credits over the Ray Charles song "Hit the Road, Jack", as Tripp and Paula sail away on his boat.
2006	Flags of Our Fathers	The actors are shown together with the veterans that once were the real soldiers they portrayed.
2006	Happy Feet	Mumble, Gloria, Memphis, Norma Jean, Noah, Ramón, Lovelace, Mrs. Astrakhan and a baby penguin can be seen tap dancing under the credits while Song of the Heart by Prince is playing.; Ramón appears and says "Gracias".
2006	Pudhupettai	During the credits, it is revealed that Kumar served three times as an MLA and twice as the Finance Minister of Tamil Nadu. Despite his political growth, he still could not find his son. Thamizhselvan retired from politics and has settled abroad with his daughter and grandchildren. Selvi had conducted her second marriage with her former fiancé. Two months after her marriage, her husband went missing, and then she had been committed to an asylum.
2006	Madea's Family Reunion	A collection of outtakes and bloopers runs during the end credits.
2006	Mater and the Ghostlight	In a post-credits scene, Mater actually encounters the Screaming Banshee (which is actually an enormous truck who is both a monster truck and a construction vehicle with a broken windshield and a "BANSHEE" logo on the front) on the road, but unaware it is him, warns him of the Banshee before departing for the safety of his junkyard once again, leaving the monstrous vehicle confused.
2006	Teen Titans: Trouble in Tokyo	During the end credits, the Titans sing a literally translated version of their Japanese theme song in celebration for the defeat of Daizo and their award ceremony.
2006	Leroy & Stitch	During the credits, a nearly-full list of Jumba's experiments is shown. (Note: The list shows only the experiments from Experiment 001, Shrink, to Experiment 626, Stitch. It does not include Experiment 627 (who is mentioned when Jumba suggests that Hämsterviel just numbers Leroy as 627, only for Gantu to remind Jumba that 627 was already created), Experiment 628 (who only appeared at the end of the episode "627" in pod form), 629/Leroy (who wasn't officially numbered 629 until 2020 through a special one-off chapter of the manga Stitch & the Samurai), Skunkuna (an unnumbered experiment from Stitch! who is said to have been made by Hämsterviel, contradicting Jumba being the experiments' creator) and Experiment 000 (an experiment who was introduced in Stitch! as the predecessor to all of the other experiments). Furthermore, 275/Tickle-Tummy, an experiment who was introduced in "Snafu", was accidentally left off the list; her number in the list was taken by Wormhole, an experiment who was later introduced in Stitch! and is actually numbered as Experiment 272.)
2006	Pattiyal	In the scene before the credits, a scene is shown where Saami is having a chat with the boy who committed the murder. The scene is shown as a deja-vu where Saami convinces Kosi and Selva that they are all part of this scheme together. Saami uses the same dialogue to the boy, letting the audience connect that the boy will be killed too.
2006	Idiocracy	A third capsule occupied by Rita's pimp Upgrayedd opens.
2006	Open Season	In a mid-credits scene, Shaw was captured by Bob and Bobbie.
2006	Tenacious D in The Pick of Destiny	Kyle and JB sit around a tape recorder, with JB telling Kyle not to make a sound unless it's a masterpiece. Kyle asks how he will know it's a masterpiece, to which JB replies that he will feel it. A few seconds later, Kyle farts. JB asks to wind the tape back.
2006	Bon Cop, Bad Cop	During the credits, a news report is shown, revealing that Buttman shall make a rule that no hockey teams will be moved.
2006	Varalaru	During the credits, the film shows what really happened in the first half.
2006	The Ugly Duckling and Me!	All the characters dance throughout the end credits.
2006	The Omen	Damien then looks at the audience and smiles knowingly as the credits roll.
2006	Wedding Daze	A series of characters getting their mugshot taken is shown throughout the end credits.
2006	Flushed Away	Roddy's original owner Tabitha, brings a new pet cat to surprise him, much to Sid's horror, who was enjoying the luxuries in Roddy's apartment.; The slugs dance on a title saying "No slugs were a-salted during the making of this film."
2006	Night at the Museum	Cecil, Gus & Reginald mop the floor. Then, a minute later, they dance.
2006	Happily N'Ever After	The Wicked Stepmother is in the Antarctic with a pair of elephant seals.
2006	Dhoom 2	As the credits roll, "Dhoom Again" is sung.
2006	Unakkum Enakkum	In a mid-credits scene, Santhosh and Kavitha are married. Also, it is hinted that Muthupandi and his servant maid Valli finally develop love for each other.
2006	Snakes on a Plane	The music video for "Snakes on a Plane (Bring it)" by Cobra Starship is shown at the beginning of the credits.
2006	Re-Animated	In a mid-credits scene, while Jimmy is leaving for school, Sonny attempts to extract his brain with a crane-like device but misses.
2006	10 Items or Less	At the beginning of the credits there are multiple extended/outtake scenes. Near the end of the credits, "Him" holds up a Diner's Club card next to the Target sign showing they accept them.; Just before the end of the credits, Scarlet is again teaching "Him" how to sing the song from the driving scene. That leads into "Him" and the car wash crew looking at the camera and clapping.
2006	Séance	In a mid-credits scene, the paramedics take Grant's body to the ambulance, with one of them shouting, "We got a live one!" Grant opens his eyes, which shine bright blue.
2007	Music and Lyrics	The end of the film (an homage to VH1's Pop-Up Video) reveals that the song becomes a hit for Cora and Alex, the film version of Sloan's novel flops with critics and moviegoers (destroying his career), PoP! reunites for their induction into the Rock and Roll Hall of Fame, after which their lead singer Colin Thompson (who left the band with some of Alex's songs to start a solo career) winds up having his hip replaced after years of dancing, and Alex and Sophie go on to become successful partners, with five new more pop hits, both in songwriting and romance.
2007	Kill Buljo	A collection of bloopers and outtakes runs during the credits. In a final scene, Unni reminisces about a list of ex-boyfriends so long that Jompi eventually hails a taxi and leaves.
2007	Blades of Glory	Hector plays with action figures of Jimmy, Chazz, and himself.
2007	American Gangster	Frank shoots the camera.
2007	Mr. Bean's Holiday	While on a beach in Cannes, Mr. Bean writes FIN on the sand with his foot. But when the camcorder's battery drains, the film ends abruptly.
2007	Pirates of the Caribbean: At World's End	Elizabeth and her son Henry watch from a sea cliff as Will returns aboard the Flying Dutchman.
2007	Vel	During the credits, happy note with Vasu and Vel embracing and the family worshipping the God in "Aayiram Jannal Veedu" is sung.
2007	The Poughkeepsie Tapes	On another tape, The Water Street Butcher promises to let a bound and gagged woman live if she doesn't blink. She does, and the screen cuts to black.
2007	Jump In!	an end credits scene wherein the Hot Chili Steppers and Karin teach Kenneth how to Double Dutch.
2007	The Grim Adventures of the KND	Ending credits shows posters of other crossover suggestions made up by Cartoon Network such as Ed, Edd n' Mandy, Evil Camp Carne, Class of Numbuh 3000, My Gym Partner's A Mandark and Samurai Mac
2007	Knocked Up	During the beginning of the credits, there are family videos after the birth of the baby. Later the cast and crew's baby photos are shown.
2007	Cinderella III: A Twist in Time	The evil stepmother and Drizella are back to human from frogs, holding brooms...and both get scared.
2007	Surf's Up	After the credits, Glen Maverick (older brother of protagonist Cody Maverick) begins dismissing the unseen Cameramen "Back to Hollywood" and forcibly throwing their interview equipment out of his and his mother Edna's igloo.
2007	Ninaithaley	During the credits, Rupa voicing.
2007	Oram Po	In a mid-credits scene, the unpredictable and fun-filled climax puts everything in order
2007	Fantastic Four: Rise of the Silver Surfer	A shot of the Silver Surfer shows his seemingly lifeless body floating through space, until his eyes open and his board races back towards him.
2007	All Hat	in a mid-credits scene, Ray Dokes and Earl Stanton.
2007	Transformers	Ron and Judy Witwicky are interviewed about the events of the film, denying that there was any alien activity.; Starscream, one of the only surviving Decepticons, leaves the Earth and returns into outer space.
2007	Robot Chicken: Star Wars	The ghost of Jar Jar Binks scares Darth Vader.
2007	Billy & Mandy's Big Boogey Adventure	The credits show the aftermath of the film, including Mandy becoming the new captain of Boogey's ship, Numbuh 3 starting her own Reaper-for-hire service that results in people laughing at her, Dracula stealing Grim's scythe for use as a golf club, Irwin being bedridden for getting infected with mono and cooties after kissing Mandy, and Boogey living in fear since his defeat.; The epilogue shows how Billy went back to the future to find that it hasn't changed as Fred Fredburger has obtained Horror's Hand from Grim's magic trunk and took over the world as the new Lord of Horror.
2007	Evan Almighty	God reveals a new commandment to the outgoing audience: "Thou shalt do the dance", followed by the film's cast and crew members dancing to the C+C Music Factory song "Gonna Make You Sweat (Everybody Dance Now)" during the closing credits.
2007	The Game Plan	During the credits, Joe, Peyton, Monique, and other characters from the film perform “Burning Love” by Elvis Presley.
2007	Taare Zameen Par	During the credits, "Taare Zameen Par" is sung.
2007	The Simpsons Movie	Mr. Burns and Smithers are in the empty mansion talking; during which Mr. Burns tells Smithers that if he committed suicide that he might feel better.; Tom Hanks says that if he is seen in person, please let him be.; The Simpsons are sitting in the theater conversing. Most notably, Maggie says her first word: "Sequel".; Near the end of the credits, the squeaky-voiced teen tidies the theater.
2007	Rush Hour 3	A collection of bloopers and outtakes runs during the credits.
2007	Superbad	The beginning of the credits are a sunset credit at the mall after Seth and Evan went their separate ways.; Later in the credits is a montage showing a bunch of Seth's third-grade "dick drawings".; Seth whispers to Evan, "I love you".
2007	Satham Podathey	In a mid-credits scene, Ravi and Bhanu are shown to be still happily married and Bhanu, visibly pregnant.
2007	Sivaji: The Boss	In a mid-credits scene, The students spot the money and go after it, causing a stampede in which Aathizeshan is trampled to death. Sivaji Foundation soon becomes a frontier for India's economic and industrial rise.
2007	Ratatouille	At the end of the credits, a stylized 2-D version of Remy eats some cheese then begins to walk away but steps wrong and injures his foot. He continues to limp away.
2007	Chennai 600028	A collection of bloopers and outtakes is shown.
2007	Lucky You	In a post-credits scene, there is a scene where Ready Eddie and Lester (the man with breast implants) argue over whether Lester actually spent an entire month in the bathroom or not.
2007	Aqua Teen Hunger Force Colon Movie Film for Theaters	The Cybernetic Ghost is seen humping the TV in the Aqua Teens living room. Frylock (who went through a sex change) tells him that it's time for bed.
2007	High School Musical 2	A collection of outtakes and during the credits.
2007	Deepavali	In a mid-credits scene, Billu gets elated that Susi has regained her memories, but Susi reveals that she does not remember anything but believes whatever he says about her life in Chennai. They finally reunite.
2007	Jab We Met	In a mid-credits scene, "Mauja Hi Mauja" is sung.
2007	Walk Hard: The Dewey Cox Story	A short black-and-white clip of "the actual Dewey Cox" (still portrayed by John C. Reilly) in San Francisco, California, dated April 16, 2002.
2007	Dan in Real Life	Dan, Marie and other family members dance at their wedding.
2007	Hot Rod	After the credits, Rod is seen bowing down to his moped with the sunset in the background.
2007	Fool & Final	The end credits have a special appearance from Mike Tyson.
2007	No Smoking	In a mid-credits scene, K, who has since gotten his finger back, is seen recommending the Prayogshaala to a friend.; In a mid-credits scene, "Phoonk De (Club Mix)" is sung.
2007	Mr. Magorium's Wonder Emporium	In a post-credits scene, Mr. Magorium appears painting a picture with a little boy watching him.
2007	Bratz	here are two musical numbers during the entire credits. The first is of the main characters singing for a crowd. The next is a music video.
2007	Underdog	During the beginning of the credits there are multiple "bloopers". Also, during the scrolling credits, there are pictures of dogs.
2007	Winx Club: The Secret of the Lost Kingdom	It is revealed the Ancestral Witches were not destroyed when Bloom defeated Mandragora and saved Domino; instead she freed their spirits and are searching for new hosts to possess. They are then shown with their descendants, the Trix, and cackle madly, leading to the events of Winx Club 3D: Magical Adventure.
2007	Alvin and the Chipmunks	Almost immediately into the credits, Ian plays the piano in front of three squirrels and attempts to get them to sing.
2007	Weirdsville	There's a scene after the end credits of an infomercial funded by Jason Taylor promoting Ciga-Tea, one of Royce's product ideas.
2007	Bee Movie	General scenes from a bee's life are shown.; Bees do the wipes between the movie studio logos and Paramount Pictures and DreamWorks Animation.
2008	The Pirates Who Don't Do Anything: A VeggieTales Movie	The song "Rock Monster" is sung as a music video with the entire cast from the movie dancing. After the song is finished, Bob the Tomato makes his first appearance in the movie.
2008	Pirivom Santhippom	As the credits roll a collection of behind-the-scenes and directed by Karu Palaniappan.
2008	Sadhu Miranda	In a post-credits scene, Moorthy finally kills Ram Mohan by throwing him off the building and rides away with Priya.
2008	Cloverfield	A strange static-filled voice saying "He is still alive" is heard.
2008	Harold & Kumar Escape from Guantanamo Bay	Neil Patrick Harris, who was shot and killed earlier in the film, picks himself off the ground unharmed.
2008	Iron Man	S.H.I.E.L.D. director Nick Fury visits Tony Stark at home to discuss the Avengers Initiative.
2008	Kung Fu Panda	Po and Master Shifu are sharing food as a pan out reveals that the seeds Shifu planted earlier have begun to sprout.
2008	The X-Files: I Want to Believe	Mulder and Scully head across the sea towards a tropical island in a rowboat, waving to the camera above.
2008	The Missing Lynx	In a mid-credits scene, it is shown that Newmann actually survived his encounter at the ship, but now has a fear of cats.
2008	Arai En 305-il Kadavul	In the first mid-credits scene, Raasu and Mokkai feel deep regret for their actions and promise to turn their lives around, which they duly do. Both of them become successful people in later life, along with Prabhu and various other characters.; In the second mid-credits scene, Arnold once again comes to the same room, to help another group of youngsters staying there and lamenting their current situation. This time, Arnold keeps His "galaxy box" bound in chains in His pocket to make sure that it is not stolen or misused like before. Arnold smiles at the camera as the film ends.
2008	Zack and Miri Make a Porno	In a post-credits scene, Zack and Miri get married and, aided by Delaney and his worker's compensation settlement, start their own video production company, Zack and Miri Make Your Porno, which makes videos for amateur couples.
2008	Leatherheads	During the end credits, pictures show Dodge and Lexie getting married, Carter donating $10,000 to the American Legion, and Carter's former manager with new clients Babe Ruth and Lou Gehrig.
2008	What Happens in Vegas	During the closing credits, there are scenes from the day Jack and Joy get married, of Tipper and Hater subsequently enacting a plan of revenge on Mason, and of Hater cutting off Dave.
2008	The Incredible Hulk	Tony Stark enters a bar where United States Army General Thunderbolt Ross is drinking and suggests using technology rather than biology for weaponry, while alluding to the Avengers Initiative.
2008	Hancock	A criminal is being pursued by cops when Hancock steps in to help.
2008	WALL-E	The credits reveal that over time, humans and robots worked together to restore the Earth, which return more plants, animals, and structures onto the planet. The humans, having regained their work ethic, also regained their healthy physiques and begin doing other different activities, such as jogging and fishing. WALL-E and EVE are shown to still be together, as seen in a painting where they are standing by a tree that's revealed to have been grown from WALL-E's plant.; Wall-E fixes Luxo Jr.'s lightbulb in the Pixar closing logo; Buy n' Large's logo appears afterwards.
2008	Space Chimps	At his home, Zartog has gone into a statue-freeze man and his dog walks pass by and looks at him, and Zartog watches his dog urinating and Zartog going to get angry because the dog peed himself. It is unknown whether Zartog did survived the shuttle and his death.
2008	Step Brothers	Brennan and Dale enact their revenge on the preteen bullies who previously beat them up.
2008	The House Bunny	The Zeta's sing at a party for Shelly
2008	Drillbit Taylor	In a post-credits scene, a student visits the nurse's office to report bruises from a recent beating. Drillbit asks for the name of the student and assures him that he will be safer from then on.
2008	Role Models	Jane Lynch & Ken Marino have a more, suggestive fun with a hot dog.
2008	Dasavathaaram	The scene shifts to the stadium, where Avatar, who had his cancerous growth taken away by Fletcher's shot, along with all the others, listens to the speech by Govind followed by the former president George W. Bush as the credits roll in "Ulaga Nagayan" is sung.
2008	Max Payne	A post-credits scene shows Max and Mona in a bar. Mona shows Max a newspaper with Aesir CEO Nicole Horne's picture on the front. Max and Mona then look at one another with understanding and renewed purpose.
2008	Rab Ne Bana Di Jodi	As the credits roll, the movie shows the couple visiting Japan on their belated honeymoon after winning the trophy for the dance competition as a reward.
2008	Passchendaele	During the end credits, Black and White footage of the real battle of Passchendaele are shown in "After the War" is sung.
2008	High School Musical 3: Senior Year	A collection of outtakes.
2008	Kit Kittredge: An American Girl	Montages of images are shown during the credits.
2008	Saroja	A collection of outtakes and during the credits.; In a post-credits scene, in the nick of time, the heroes emerge from the hideout and fight the goons with all their might. Vishwanath finally shoots and kills Ravichandran, and Saroja is reunited with her family. As everyone returns home, the four friends try to recall the name of the girl whom they have just rescued.
2008	Fly Me to the Moon	Immediately after the movie is a live-action short film featuring the real Buzz Aldrin, who delivers a strange message on behalf of NASA. It's something to the effect of admitting that the fly-related events of the film are "impossible" and hence, fictional.
2008	Bolt	A hamster runs on a wheel that is powering the credit roll. He gets tired and stops; another hamster comes up to take his place.
2008	Dindigul Sarathy	In a mid-credits scene, Sarathy resolves his issues and reunites with Vasanthi. "Dindukalu Remix" is sung.
2008	Sathyam	Sathyam is promoted to Deputy Commissioner by the Chief Minister and marries Deivanayaki, and the credits roll in Aaradi Kaathe is sung.
2008	Yes Man	Carl and Allison go down a winding road in full-body skates.
2008	Disaster Movie	There are multiple bloopers and alternate scenes during the first half of the credits.
2008	Slumdog Millionaire	During the first half of the credits, both the adult and juvenile versions of Latika and Jamal are shown dancing and the dancers dance to "Jai Ho".
2008	Karzzzz	Monty and Tina are reunited as the end credits roll.
2008	Lost Boys: The Tribe	In a mid-credits scene, Edgar encounters Sam Emerson, now a vampire. They exchange some dialogue and charge at each other as the credits resume.
2008	Sex Drive	During the credits, a short scene shows Ezekiel and Fall Out Boy arguing over the fact that the Amish fixed Fall Out Boy's tour bus for just "a five song set" in form for compensation, referring to a running gag throughout the movie.
2008	A Muppets Christmas: Letters to Santa	A collection of bloopers and outtakes during the end credits.
2008	BURN-E	SUPPLY-R pats BURN-E on the head and tries to comfort him.
2008	Return To Sleepaway Camp	In a post-credits scene, a flashback set three weeks before the film shows how Angela escaped from the psychiatric clinic. She causes a brake fluid leak in a car and flags down Sheriff Pete, the real sheriff. She murders him by dropping the car on his head and steals his clothes to become the new sheriff.
2009	Paradise	After the end credits roll, a title card reads "in memory of Manny Farber", then a short clip of Manny Farber standing outside and looking around is shown.
2009	Paul Blart: Mall Cop	Paul and Amy get married at the mall.
2009	Coraline	Partway through the credits, behind-the-scenes footage of the mice swirling around the portal is shown, giving a look at the process of animating in front of the bluescreen.
2009	Jonas Brothers: The 3D Concert Experience	There Is Scene before the credits where it shows the Jonas brothers, (and Rob) where they are commenting on how their movie was.
2009	Pontypool	In a post-credits scene, Sydney and Grant (now known as "Lisa the Killer" and "Johnny Deadeyes") survive the virus and continue speaking English by maintaining a system of improvisational roleplay as the screen shifts from black and white to color.
2009	Super Capers	In a post-credits scene, the Judge has met with his chauffeur and the Special Agents Smith stating that Gruberman has proved that God exists. The Special Agents Smith plan to unleash their powers as their eyes glow green. The words "To be continued" then appear on the screen.
2009	Hotel for Dogs	The credits are accompanied by clips and stills of the cast and crew with their pets (mostly dogs, but at least one cat and a snake).
2009	A Town Called Panic	A giant firework, causing a giant fireworks display that accidentally destroys the landscape as the credits roll.
2009	Fired Up!	During the end credits, a scene plays in which Nick and Diora begin making out on the grounds but Nick is found by the coach, who makes him perform a naked drill while being held. This is followed by a collection of bloopers and outtakes from the film.; In a final post-credits scene, the eagle mascot takes off his costume head to breathe but asks the eagle mascot to keep its head on while they make out. The camera pans over to Bianca kissing Angela under the pretense that she is demonstrating how to kiss a guy.; As the credits end, there is a faint groan.
2009	Race to Witch Mountain	There are multiple short segments shown during the first half of the credits. Jack and Dr. Friedman are speaking at a UFO convention about their book Race to Witch Mountain. After they get in the car to leave the convention, the device they received from Sara and Seth starts to make a sound and flashes indicating that they are returning.
2009	Hannah Montana: The Movie	During the credits, the cast dances to "Hoedown Throwdown".
2009	Monsters Vs. Aliens	Wanting to get some coffee, the president accidentally pushes the wrong red button, setting off the nuclear missiles.
2009	All About Steve	After the end credits, a competitive TV reporter, in pain that Hartman gained popularity by jumping into the sinkhole to save Mary, also jumps into it.
2009	Up	Over the credits, Carl has started a new adventure book detailing his life as he settles into retirement while spending lots of time with Russell. Carl moves into Shady Oaks, where the dogs bring happiness to the residents while Carl lives happily with Russell and Dug by his side. Kevin is in South America with her children.
2009	X-Men Origins: Wolverine	Stryker is detained for questioning by MPS in connection with the death of General Munson, whom Stryker murdered to protect his experiment and Deadpool is shown to have survived his decapitation, proceeding to break the fourth wall by shushing the audience. In a deleted post-credits scene, Logan is seen in Japan drinking heavily.
2009	Night at the Museum: Battle of the Smithsonian	The sailor from the Life Magazine photo reverse engineers Larry's cellphone.
2009	Ed, Edd n Eddy's Big Picture Show	Jonny and Plank, outraged after everyone turned against them, vow revenge and replace their superhero personas "Captain Mellon Head" and "Splinter" with the new villainous alter-egos "The Gourd" and "Timber the Dark Shard". However, Plank tells Jonny that there is no time left in the movie, with Jonny being oblivious to his presence within the film.
2009	Villu	In a mid-credits scene, with the truth about Saravanan finally revealed, the army reinstates his titles, honours, and badges and also returns his army badge and uniform to his widow.
2009	Miss March	During the credits, Eugene's doctor is attempting to resuscitate a coma with a baseball bat the same way Tucker did Eugene. The coma patient turned out to be Crystal, who woke up before the doctor struck her, promising to kill Tucker.
2009	Spectacular!	During the credits, Nikko and Courtney share a kiss. It ends with Spectacular!, Flux, and Mr. Romano in a studio together recording a song, suitably named "Everything Can Change", with Nikko and Courtney as the lead singers in the song.
2009	Dug's Special Mission	After the credits are shown, Dug is told to speak; he replies "Hi there!," surprising Carl and Russell.
2009	I Can Do Bad All by Myself	A collection of outtakes and bloopers runs during the end credits.
2009	Madea Goes to Jail	During the credits, there are more scenes with Madea and Phil McGraw.
2009	Kanden Kadhalai	In a mid-credits scene, Shakthi and Anjali walking.
2009	The Collector	The Collector watches film slides on the trunk containing Arkin, who threatens to kill him.
2009	Land of the Lost	Dr. Rick Marshall leaves the studio and forgets the dinosaur egg. It hatches and a baby Sleestak is born.
2009	Michael Jackson's This Is It	There are two scenes after the closing credits. The first was a clip of Michael rehearsing "Human Nature" a couple of weeks before his death.; In a post-credits scene, Michael Jackson center stage, giving artistic instructions to his team during rehearsal.; The other was a video of the little girl who appeared in "Earth Song" holding the earth with the words "Heal The World" above her, followed by Michael's signature, and his final message to his fans: "I love you."
2009	Transformers: Revenge of the Fallen	Sam goes back to college.
2009	Siva Manasula Sakthi	In a post-credits scene, A scene set two years later reveals that Siva and Sakthi are married and have a son, to whom Siva brags about how he successfully "got the girl".
2009	Alvin and the Chipmunks: The Squeakquel	In a mid-credits scene, the bullies are shown scraping gum off the bleachers.; In a post-credits scene, Ian gets thrown in the dumpster by the security guards.
2009	Magadheera	As the credits roll, Rolling Titles Music plays.
2009	Couples Retreat	The characters enjoy themselves on the island.; The guys pee in the bushes and Shane is talking about how the Federal Reserve is a pimp game.
2009	G-Force	During the credits, All is well as everyone all celebrates to be promoted as special agents.
2009	Saw VI	Amanda tells the kidnapped girl from Saw III not to trust the one who saves her.
2009	Planet 51	Professor Kipple survived the explosion from Base 9, And he sees soldiers that had brain surgery takes the professor to brain surge him In space, The satellite brings the ship back to earth As chuck says No no no easy, Not the tongue, not the tongue- (The xeromorph dog sticks to his tongue in chuck’s face and chuck takes the dog’s tongue out of his face and says this is going to be a long trip.)
2009	Do Knot Disturb	In a post-credits scene, Raj, E Dolly Dolly.
2009	Peraanmai	In the end, Ganapathiram is awarded by the Indian government for "bravery", while Dhuruvan is back at the camp training another set of new NCC cadets. The girls bid a tearful goodbye, remembering Ajitha and Susheela.
2009	13B	During the credits, "Oh Crazy Mama" is sung.
2009	Dragonball Evolution	Piccolo is revealed to be alive and treated by a mysterious woman.
2009	Aliens in the Attic	Bethany and Tom get revenge on Ricky by making him look like a fool in front of his new girlfriend Annie Filkins, using the mind control remote; Bethany gleefully comments that "she is so keeping this" after she and Tom record Ricky landing on his crotch on the stair rail.; A collection of outtakes and bloopers runs during the end credits.
2009	Arumugam	In a post-credits scene, a song is sung.
2009	Kick	In a mid-credits scene, Kalyan Krishna leaves with a new respect for his foe after learning his true motives of helping the children.
2009	The Proposal	Gilbertson questions Margaret, Andrew, Andrew's family, and Ramone. Each of the answers proves Gilbertson right about them.
2009	Old Dogs	During the credits, Dan and Vicki are together, Charlie has married Amanda, and Craig has become like a new "uncle" to the children.
2009	Zombieland	Tallahassee struggles to find adequate final words for Bill Murray. Murray appears and helps Tallahassee recite a line from Caddyshack: "In the immortal words of Jean-Paul Sartre...au revoir, gopher."
2009	Shorts	During the credits, two of the small aliens herd the miniaturized booger monster into their UFO.; When the closing credits reach the song section, Jimmy Bennett states he wrote the song 'Summer Never Ends' thereby his wish came true
2009	One Piece Film: Strong World	It has grown more on the islands of Merville as the animal have lost their aggression. Billy flies over greeting the residents and finally at Xiao who waves at the screen.
2009	James Cameron's Avatar	The 2022 re-release has multiple scenes from the upcoming sequel, although which scene is shown appears to be random per theater: A group of Na'vi are seen learning to swim and breathe underwater. Most of the students struggle with the process but a young Na'vi is a natural.; A young Na'vi boy wakes up on a large whale-like sea creature out in the water. The boy thanks the creature for saving his life. The boy then removes a large harpoon-type weapon from the creature's fin. They become friends and the boy rides the creature through the ocean by holding his fin as they swim off together.
2009	My Bloody Valentine 3D	A resulting cave-in. Tom also survives, murdering the rescue worker who finds him and escaping in the worker's gear.
2009	Blue	cuddling on one of Aarav's boats as the end credits begin and "Fiqrana" and "Blue" is sung.
2009	Tekken	it is revealed that Heihachi survived his execution, with his captor Jackhammer standing down when ordered to do so.
2009	Nativity!	Multiple videos of the children featured in the movie are shown.
2009	Jump	During the credits, Phoenix and her friends return to the village and teach everyone to dance to hip hop. Even the scarecrow is dressed in hip-hop clothing.
2009	The Hangover	Various pictures from the digital camera they found play alongside the credits.
2009	State of Play	The process of printing the day's newspaper that highlights Rep. Stephen Collins being implicated in the murders is shown.

== See also ==
- List of films with post-credits scenes (before 2000)
- List of films with post-credits scenes (2010s)
- List of films with post-credits scenes (2020s)
- Mid-credits and post-credits scenes in the Marvel Cinematic Universe
