= Elizabeth Chambers (television personality) =

American actress (born 1982)

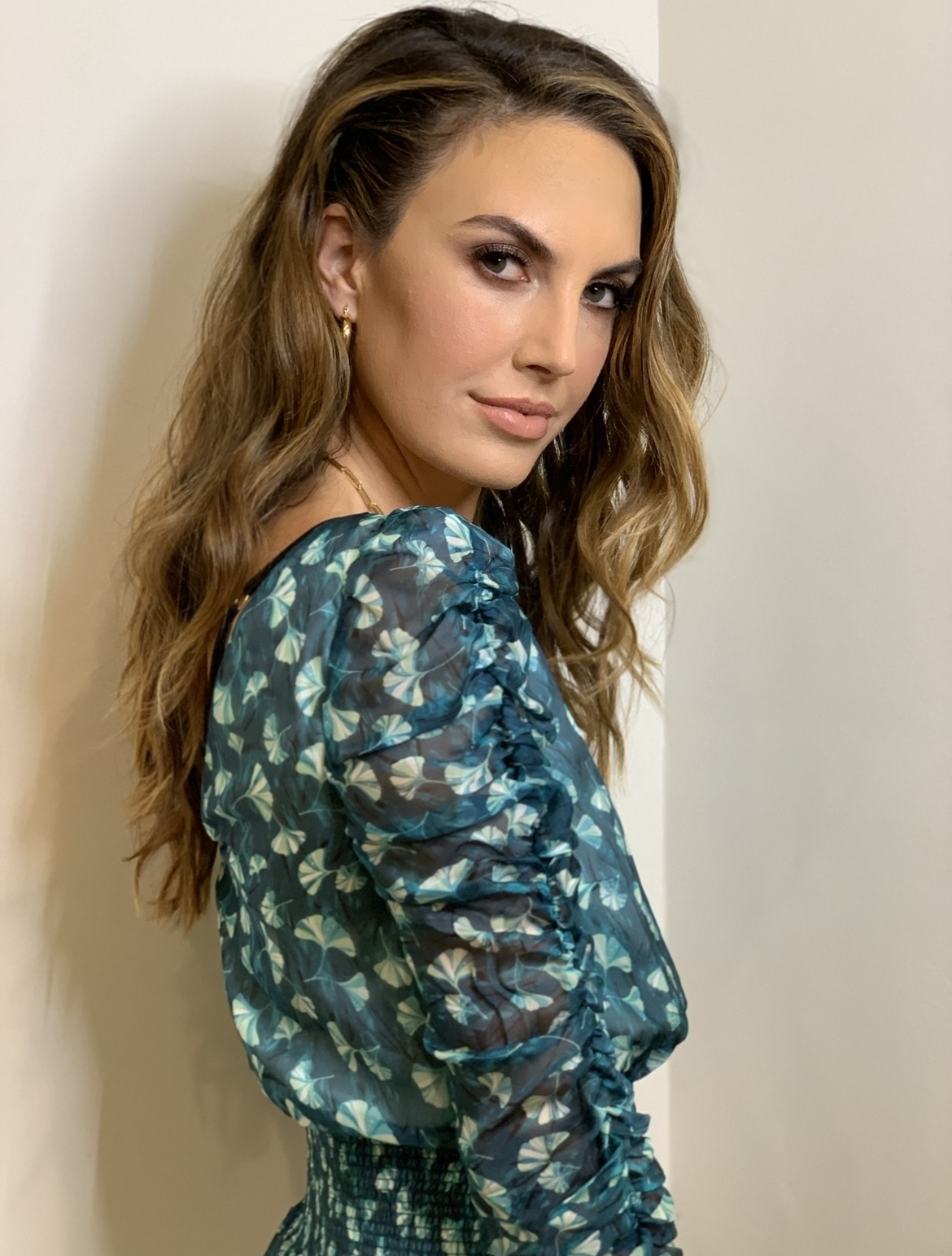
- Chambers in 2019
- Born: August 18, 1982 (age 44); San Antonio, Texas, U.S.
- Other name: Elizabeth Chambers Hammer
- Occupations: Television personality; entrepreneur
- Years active: 1998–present
- Spouse: Armie Hammer (m. 2010; div. 2023)
- Children: 2

Elizabeth Chambers (born August 18, 1982) is an American television personality and entrepreneur. She appeared in various films, television series, and culinary shows. and In addition, she is the founder of the Texas-based BIRD Bakery retail chain.

== Early life and education ==
Chambers was born in San Antonio, Texas. She is the oldest of four children, and her maternal grandmother, Maureen Carnathan, was of British descent and raised in India; she helped care for her grandmother after she was diagnosed with Parkinson's disease. Her parents divorced when she was two, and she and her mother left Texas, first for Colorado and then California, before returning to Colorado, where she attended high school. She said that Texas always felt like a "safe space".

Chambers studied journalism at the University of Texas at Austin.

== Career ==
Chambers’ first job was as a correspondent at Al Gore's television network Current TV. Chambers was later a news correspondent for Entertainment Tonight, E! News, and Access Hollywood, and was the chief correspondent for the Human Rights Foundation. She played the role of Kathryn in the 2007 film The Game Plan, and also appeared in various television shows, including Criminal Minds, Shark, Moonlight, and 2 Broke Girls. In 2017, Chambers was the "Most Beautiful Foodie" according to People.

Chambers was the host of several culinary shows and filmed holiday cooking, including on the Cooking Channel (Sugar Showdown), the Food Network (The Kitchen, Cupcake Wars, Best Baker in America, and Chopped Sweets), and was also a host on various television shows, including Today, for interviews about her brand as a businesswoman. In May 2013, she was a guest on the CNBC show Crowd Rules. In 2020, Chambers was named to the University of Texas at Austin's "Outstanding Alumni" list. In 2024, she starred in the reality television series Grand Cayman: Secrets in Paradise. In 2025, she was the host of the Investigation Discovery true crime series Toxic.

=== BIRD Bakery ===
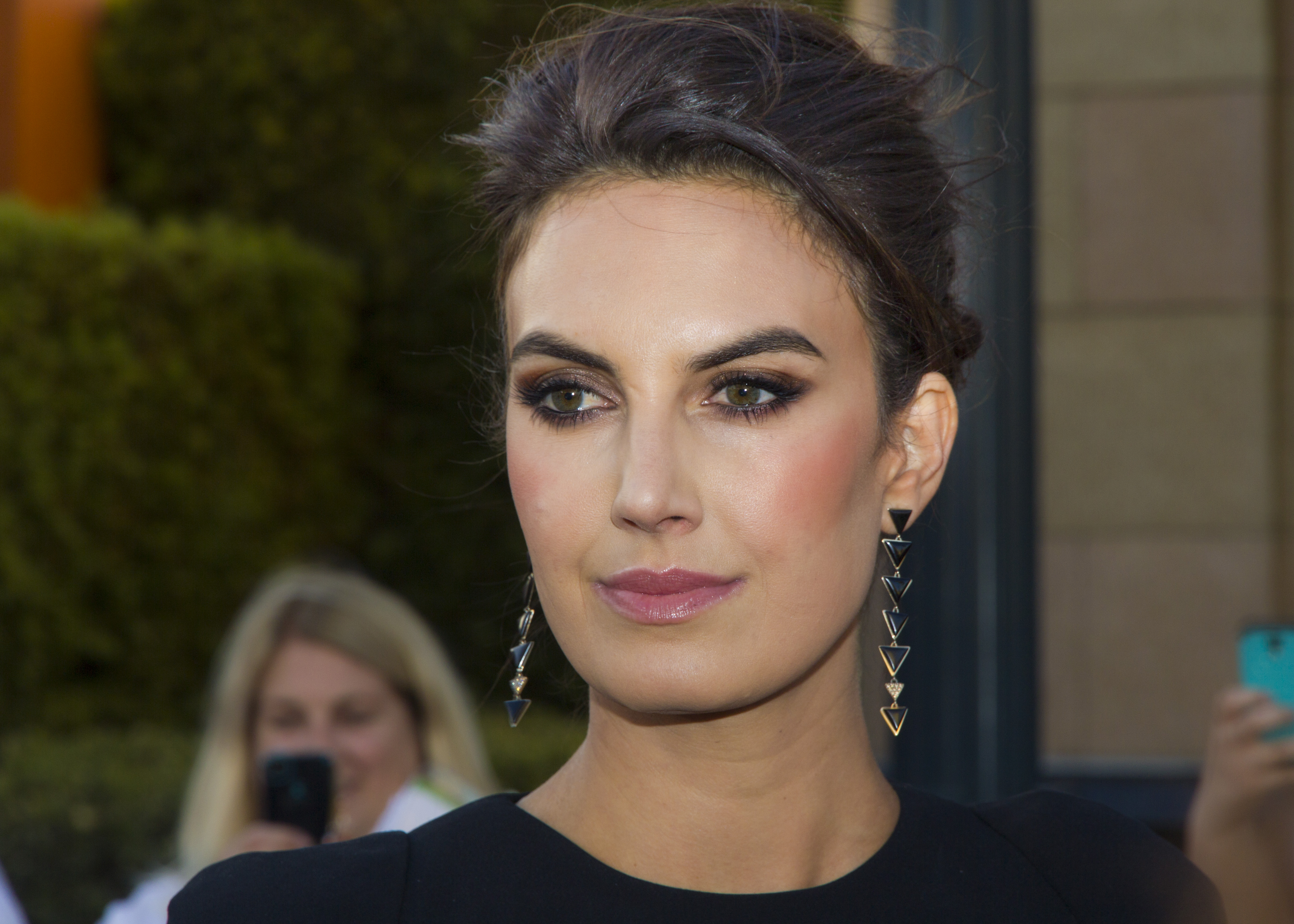
Chambers in 2013

Chambers' mother and grandmother respectively owned one of San Antonio's first natural-food stores and ran a local catering company and sparked her interest in cooking. Chambers is the proprietor of BIRD Bakery, which opened in San Antonio in 2012 and in Dallas in 2016. Its baked goods are based on recipes from her grandmother's kitchen, and she said it "all felt very full circle" as the bakery in San Antonio is located one block away from the street where she was born.

In June 2019, as the owner of BIRD Bakery, Chambers was a guest judge on the Food Network's Best Baker in America. In February and March 2020, she was also a guest judge on Chopped Sweets. In June 2020, Chambers raised money for the San Antonio Food Bank. In October 2020, she launched Vision Visors, which made face masks for children. BIRD Bakery also partnered with cancer non-profit Salood, for which she helped design a cookie to benefit pediatric cancer patients. Unsold food at BIRD Bakery is boxed and picked up by local non-profits, including among others churches, fire, and police departments, the Fisher House Foundation, and the Polycystic Kidney Disease Foundation. During the COVID-19 pandemic, Chambers ran BIRD Bakery from the Cayman Islands, where she had relocated. In 2021, she opened a third bakery in Denver, Colorado.

== Personal life ==
In 2007, Chambers met Armie Hammer through a mutual friend in Los Angeles, California. After a few months of friendship and nine months of dating, Hammer proposed to Chambers, and their wedding was celebrated at the All Saints' Episcopal Church in Beverly Hills, California. Their wedding was featured in a spread for Town & Country and other publications. During their time together, they had two children. In 2018, Chambers and Hammer bought a $4.7 million mansion in Hancock Park, Los Angeles, to raise their children. In the spring of 2020 due to the COVID-19 pandemic in the United States, she moved to the Cayman Islands with their children.

Chambers and Hammer separated in July 2020. Citing irreconcilable differences, Chambers filed for divorce, which was finalized in June 2023. She said that for most of her marriage to Hammer, the couple was seeing psychotherapist Esther Perel, and that a "divorce is a death" and it was "the last thing [she] ever wanted". As of 2023, she was dating a 26-year-old European boyfriend who she said was helping heal "my body, my heart, and my mind". By 2024, Chambers and her children moved back to the United States in Los Angeles. Hammer's mother later acknowledged that he had infidelities, and Hammer himself admitted in a 2023 interview to Air Mail of having had an affair in 2016, that their sexual relationship involved "consensual non-consent" role play, and that he confessed the affair to Chambers, who avoided speaking publicly about him in the two years after their separation.

In an Instagram post in February 2021, Chambers addressed sexual abuse allegations against Hammer, offering support for "any victim of assault or abuse", while stating to be "shocked, heartbroken, and devastated" and that she "didn't realize how much I didn't know". After watching House of Hammer, a Discovery+ docuseries about the abuse allegations, having turned down the offer to take part in it, she told E! News: "It was obviously heartbreaking on so many levels and very painful. But at the same time, it exists ... The past is the past and all we can do is take this as a moment to learn and listen, and hopefully process and heal in every capacity." She added that she considered herself a feminist and "in solidarity with anyone who has been a victim of any sort and hope they find healing". In September 2022, released documents suggested that Chambers was involved with the multiple women who came forward with claims of abuse against Hammer. Based on messages posted by Effie (the main accuser against Hammer), there were allegations that Chambers collaborated with them. The messages, which were posted on Effie's Instagram account, showed that Chambers allegedly asked Effie to formally file a complaint against Hammer. Effie accused Chambers in a statement of wanting to "profit" from the situation.

== Filmography ==
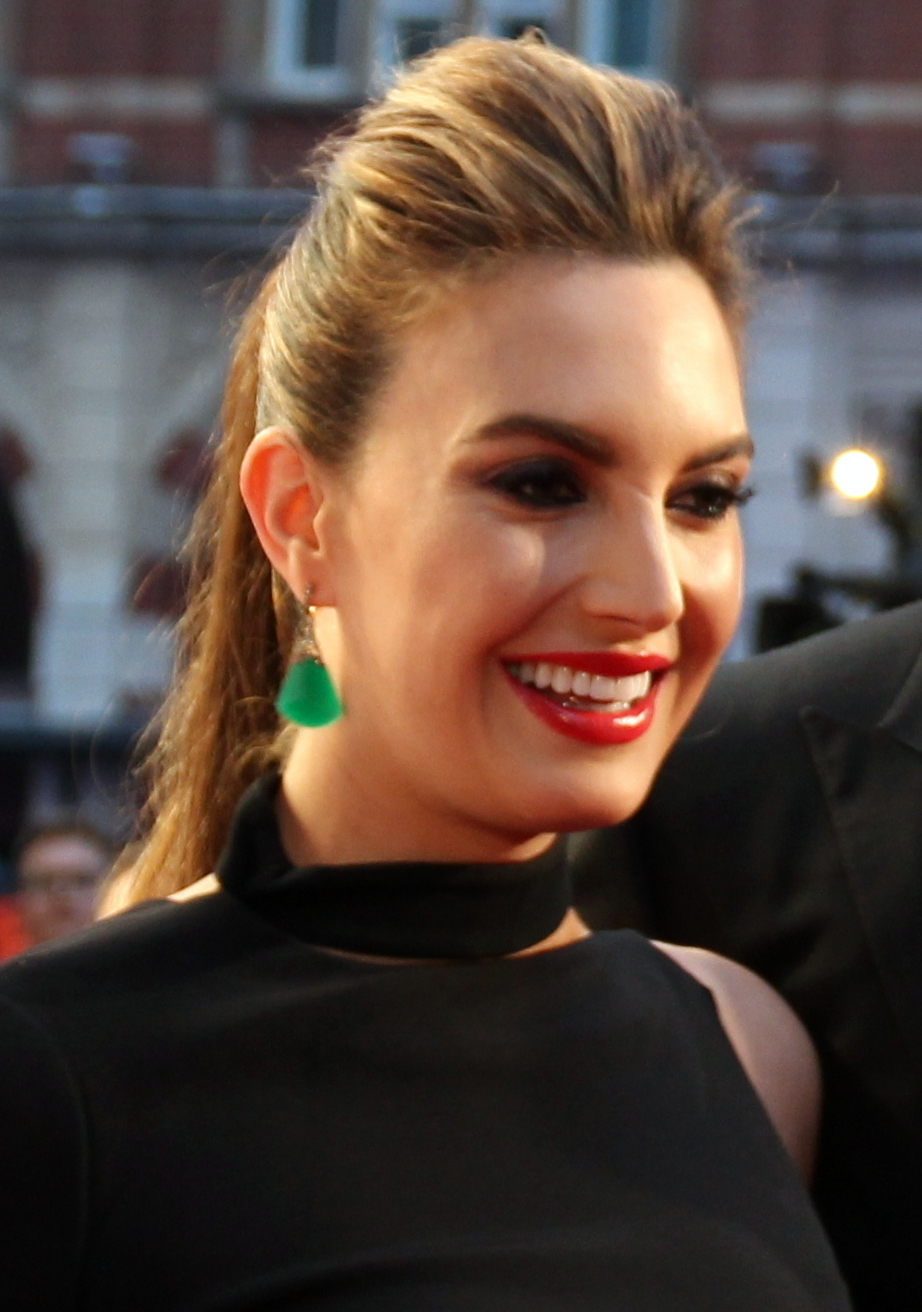
Chambers at the 2016 BFI London Film Festival

=== Film ===
Year	Title	Role	Notes
2007	The Game Plan	Kathryn	

=== Television ===
Year	Title	Notes
2005–2006	Criminal Minds	Herself, 2 episodes ("The Fox" and "The Performer")
2007	Shark	"Hot Woman", 2 episodes ("Wayne's World 2" and "Revenge of the Shark")
2007	Moonlight	Uncredited "Victoria's Secret Model", 1 episode ("Sleeping Beauty")
2015–2017	Sugar Showdown	Judge, 6 episodes
2015	The Kitchen	Guest, 1 episode ("First Taste of Fall")
2016	Cupcake Wars	Judge, 7 episodes
2016	2 Broke Girls	Vanessa Nibotita, 1 episode ("And the Two Openings: Part Two")
2019	Best Baker in America	Judge, 1 episode ("All-American Birthday Bash: Chocolate-Flavored")
2020	Chopped Sweets	Chef and judge, 3 episodes ("Tiny Treats", "Tough Cookies", and "Million Dollar Desserts")
2024–present	Grand Cayman: Secrets in Paradise	Executive producer, 10 episodes
2025-present	Toxic	Executive producer, 6 episodes
