= List of films with post-credits scenes =

List of lists

The list of films with post-credits scenes is split across the following pages:

- List of films with post-credits scenes (before 2000)
- List of films with post-credits scenes (2000s)
- List of films with post-credits scenes (2010s)
- List of films with post-credits scenes (2020s)
