= Grand Cayman: Secrets in Paradise =

2024 reality television series

- Genre: Reality
- Starring: Elizabeth Chambers; Selita Ebanks; Courtney McTaggart; Craig Jervis; Julian Foster; Aaron Bernardo; Cass Lacelle; Victoria Jurkowski; Chelsea Flynn; Teri Bilewitch; Trevor Coleman; Dillon Claassens; Connor Bunney; Frank Schilling
- Country of origin: United States
- Original language: English
- No. of series: 1
- No. of episodes: 10

Production
- Executive producers: Aaron Rothman; Josh Halpert; Jessica Chesler; Jesse Light; Sean Rankine; Mark Seliga; Johnny Fountain; Camilo Valdes
- Producers: Elizabeth Chambers; Selita Ebanks
- Production location: Grand Cayman
- Production companies: Haymaker East; This Way Out Media

Original release
- Network: Freeform
- Release: April 9 – May 14, 2024

Grand Cayman: Secrets in Paradise is an American reality television series that premiered on April 9, 2024, on Freeform.

== Cast ==
- Elizabeth Chambers
- Selita Ebanks
- Courtney McTaggart
- Craig Jervis
- Julian Foster
- Aaron Bernardo
- Cass Lacelle
- Victoria Jurkowski
- Chelsea Flynn
- Teri Bilewitch
- Trevor Coleman
- Dillon Claassens
- Connor Bunney
- Frank Schilling

== Production ==
On December 7, 2023, it was announced that Hulu had ordered the series. On March 6, 2024, the series moved to Freeform. The series premiered on April 9, 2024.

== Episodes ==
No.	Title	Original release date	U.S. viewers (millions)
1	"Tropic Like It's Hot"	April 9, 2024	N/A
2	"Flirting with Disaster"	April 16, 2024	N/A
3	"Tequila and Tears"	April 16, 2024	N/A
4	"Sunday Not-So-Funday"	April 23, 2024	N/A
5	"Stir It Up"	April 23, 2024	N/A
6	"Caught in the Crossfire"	April 30, 2024	N/A
7	"BDSM Gone Wrong"	April 30, 2024	N/A
8	"Trouble in Paradise"	May 7, 2024	N/A
9	"The Cookie Crumbles"	May 7, 2024	N/A
10	"Easter Rumble"	May 14, 2024	N/A
