= Jared J. Grantham =

American nephrologist

Jared J. Grantham (1936–2017) was an American physician and nephrologist who was the founding editor of the Journal of the American Society of Nephrology and co-founder of the PKD Foundation. The Jared Grantham Kidney Institute at the University of Kansas Medical Center is named in his honor.
