= List of films with post-credits scenes (before 2000) =

Many films have featured mid- and post-credits scenes. Such scenes often include comedic gags, plot revelations, outtakes, or hints about sequels.

== 1960s ==
Year	Title	Description of scene(s)
1966	The Silencers	Matt Helm lounges on a bed with several scantily clad women while overlain text reads: "Coming up next: Matt Helm meets Lovey Kravezit in Murderers' Row."
1966	What's Up, Tiger Lily?	Woody Allen watches China Lee do a striptease, explaining that he promised he would put her in the film somewhere.
1968	She-Devils on Wheels	Queen rejoins her gang waiting for her outside the town's jail and they all ride out of town to places unknown.
1968	Night of the Living Dead	Still images of bodies being piled are shown throughout the credits, followed by a shot of a bonfire.

== 1970s ==
Year	Title	Description of scene(s)
1970	House of Dark Shadows	The apparently dead body of Barnabas Collins transforms into a bat and flies away.
1972	Snoopy Come Home	Woodstock types the credits on Snoopy's typewriter.
1977	Breaker! Breaker!	Various CB radio chatter is heard during the credits.
1977	Martin	The credits overlay Martin's burial.
1978	Hooper	Outtakes of stunts performed in the film are shown throughout the entirety of the credits.
1979	Meatballs	Pranked Morty awakens from his bed on a raft in the middle of the lake, constantly falling into the water and calling out for help throughout the end credits.
1979	The Muppet Movie	At the end of the film, Sweetums crashes through the screen, having finally caught up with his friends, who congratulate each other during the credits.; In a post-credits scene, Animal tells the audience to "Go home".
1979	Hot Stuff	A series of characters get their mugshots taken during the end credits.
1979	Being There	Blooper reel of Peter Sellers (removed in non-theatrical releases).

== 1980s ==
Year	Title	Description of scene(s)
1980	Airplane!	A taxicab passenger, abandoned by the lead at the beginning of the film, grumbles that he will give the driver twenty more minutes to return.
1980	Smokey and the Bandit II	A collection of bloopers from the movie plays throughout the credits.
1981	The Cannonball Run	A collection of bloopers from the movie. This trend would continue in the sequels.
1981	The Great Muppet Caper	After the credits, Gonzo snaps a photo of the audience, with the screen going black to suggest his overpowered flash bulb blinds the audience and promises to send copies to everyone.
1981	Honky Tonk Freeway	During the end credits the various characters are shown in their current situations, including Mayor Calo riding Bubbles the elephant as she water skis.
1981	My Bloody Valentine	The camera rides along the mine cart tracks throughout the entire credits; ending in an open area. Then the killer walks around and then swings the pick at the screen.
1982	The Man from Snowy River	After the credits finish rolling, some wild horses can be seen running.
1982	Airplane II	A post-credit message – "Coming from Paramount Pictures: Airplane III" – inspires Murdock to remark, "That's exactly what they'll be expecting us to do!"
1984	This Is Spinal Tap	Clips from interviews with the band members are shown during the credits.
1984	The Muppets Take Manhattan	Animal can be heard saying, "Buh-bye! Buh-bye! Buh-bye! ... Hasta luego!" (Spanish for "See you later")
1984	Top Secret!	Nick Rivers and his backup sing a reprise of "Spend This Night with Me".
1985	Sesame Street Presents: Follow That Bird	Count von Count says he will count the credits, leaves for a while, and returns at the end having counted 278.
1985	Heart of Dragon	A collection of bloopers and outtakes runs during the end credits.
1985	Young Sherlock Holmes	Ehtar is revealed to be alive; he checks himself into an Alpine inn with a new name, "Moriarty", foreshadowing his role as Holmes' future nemesis.
1985	Crimewave	A character is seen in an unknown place getting out of a box.
1985	Police Story	Inspired by The Cannonball Run, Jackie Chan also put a collection of bloopers from the movie in the end credits.
1986	Aces Go Places IV	A collection of bloopers and behind-the-scenes footage is shown throughout the end credits.
1986	Aliens	The sounds of a facehugger's movements are heard.
1986	Chopping Mall	A killbot rolls toward the camera and tells the audience to have a nice day.
1986	Ferris Bueller's Day Off	In a scene that plays during the end credits, a humiliated, disheveled, and injured Rooney reluctantly accepts a ride on a school bus filled with students who act derisively toward him.; In a post-credits scene, Ferris looks into the camera and says, "You're still here? It's over! Go home! Go."
1986	Millionaires Express	Behind-the-scenes footage is shown throughout the end credits.
1986	Super Mario Bros.: The Great Mission to Rescue Princess Peach!	A woman buys something in a store controlled by Bowser.
1986	The Mission	There is a brief post-credits scene of the cardinal folding and sealing his report to Rome. He looks into the camera and the scene ends.
1986	Top Gun	Before the credits roll, the cast shown with each actor and actress while "You've Lost That Lovin' Feelin'" plays. Two planes are seen in flight.
1987	Angel Heart	During the end credits, Harry is seen standing inside an iron Otis elevator that is interminably descending, presumably to Hell. As the screen fades to black, Cyphre can be heard whispering, "Harry" and "Johnny", claiming his dominion over both of their souls.
1987	Adventures in Babysitting	Graydon stands on the ledge, still trying to find his way to safety.
1987	Ernest Goes to Camp	The camp chefs Jake and Eddie do a taste test of Eggs Erroneous, a recipe they were working on during the film.
1987	Million Dollar Mystery	During the end credits Fred and Bob discuss what they would do with a million dollars. Fred wants to get a Swiss doctor to give him new nasal passages transplanted from a llama. Bob says that he would live off of banana splits.
1987	Masters of the Universe	Skeletor's head emerges from the water at the bottom of the pit, saying "I'll be back!"
1987	Amazon Women on the Moon	Towards the end of the credits, Murray walks out, still trying to exit the television. He finally gives up and walks away. After the credits, Carrie Fisher and Paul Bartel appear in a black-and-white ephemeral film called "Reckless Youth" warning about the spread of "social diseases" in the style of Reefer Madness.
1987	Planes, Trains and Automobiles	Over Thanksgiving dinner in a conference room in the office, advertising executive William Windom continues to examine the same photos Neil was waiting for him to finish looking at the start of the film.
1988	Dragons Forever	A collection of bloopers and outtakes runs during the end credits.
1988	Alien from L.A.	During the credits, the Anchorman appears on a monitor to reassure the Atlanteans that Wanda Saknussemm is "just a figment of your imagination".
1988	Married to the Mob	Numerous one-off jokes related to other scenes throughout the movie are shown.
1988	I'm Gonna Git You Sucka	A wounded Kung Fu Joe walks up to a cop and says that he is looking for Slade. The cop replies that the final battle is already over and walks away.
1988	Tin Toy	Eventually, Billy, whose face is now covered in a shopping bag, leaves the room, followed by Tinny as the credits roll. With Billy gone, the newly optimistic toys from underneath the couch are safe to come out.
1988	She's Having a Baby	Various stars suggesting baby names - Kirstie Alley, Harry Anderson, Jay and Michael Astin, Dan Aykroyd, Matthew Broderick, John Candy, Dyan Cannon, Belinda Carlisle, Ted Danson, Judi Evans, Woody Harrelson, Robert Hays, Magic Johnson, Michael Keaton, Joanna Kerns, Penny Marshall, Bill Murray, Roy Orbison, Cindy Pickett, Annie Potts, John Ratzenberger, Ally Sheedy, Lyman Ward, Wil Wheaton, and Warren Zevon.
1988	Feds	in the credits scene, both Ellie and Janis are assigned as partners to the Los Angeles office.
1988	The Great Outdoors	During the end credits, Chet, Connie, Roman, Kate, and Wally dance to "Land of a Thousand Dances" in a bar.; In the post-credits scene, the raccoon family (who rummaged through the trash cans throughout the film) talk in their language about what happened to "Jody" and states that she is "bald on both ends now".
1989	All Dogs Go to Heaven	During the end credits, Carface arrives in Heaven and takes his own watch, vowing revenge against King Gator, who's eating him alive. As Annabelle chases him and warns against using it, Charlie assures the audience that "he'll be back".
1989	Back to the Future Part II	A trailer for Back to the Future Part III is shown before the end credits.
1989	Project A-Ko: FINAL	At the final credits, A-Ko Magami (in her sailor-suited battle suit) and B-ko Daitokuji (in her Akagiyama-23 battle suit) have became best friends forever, as they're leaving planet earth and permanently goes into outer space, several days after reunited with C-ko. Eventually, the duo became the bounty hunters in the galaxy, setting up the events of Project A-ko: Gray Side/Blue Side. (Note: The HD remastered version only.)
1989	God of Gamblers	A collection of outtakes from the film runs during the end credits.
1989	The Adventures of Milo and Otis	Milo, Otis, Joyce, and Sondra (along with their litters) happily find their way back together through the forest to their farm as the credits roll.
1989	Tetsuo: The Iron Man	After the credits, the phrase "Game Over" is shown.

== 1990s ==
Year	Title	Description of scene(s)
1990	All for the Winner	A collection of bloopers and outtakes from the film runs during the end credits.
1990	Gremlins 2: The New Batch	At three different times during the end credits, Daffy Duck pops in and says "Long, isn't it?", "Patently ridiculous", and "Still lurking about? Don't you people have homes?"; Daffy Duck stops Porky Pig from saying his "That's all folks" catchphrase so he can say it, and gets crushed by the Warner Bros. shield (revealing a credit for animation writer and director Chuck Jones).
1990	Pantyhose Hero	A collection of bloopers and outtakes from the film runs during the end credits.
1990	House Party	During the credits roll, the roof that was blown off earlier lands on top of the police officers.
1990	Disturbed	A post-credits scene shows Dr. Russell in a padded room kissing the camera and then laughing.
1991	The Top Bet	Several short scenes play during the end credits to show what becomes of the characters, including ones in which Fanny is reunited with her brother, Mei attempts to talk with Bee in private, and Mei demonstrates a wind control technique to Fanny.
1991	The Naked Gun 2½: The Smell of Fear	At the end of the credits, President Bush can be heard practicing a speech while on the toilet.
1991	HauntedWeen	At the end of the credits, the screen reads: "COMING SOON - HAUNTEDWEEN II". A line of dialogue from the film is replayed: "Hey, look, everybody, there's another room! Come on!"
1992	Fist of Fury 1991 II	During the credits, Wan-To lives as a beggar following his defeat. This is followed by a collection of outtakes and bloopers.
1992	Wayne's World	Garth's voice is heard asking if anyone is going to tell the group to leave.
1992	The Gate II: Trespassers	In a post-credits scene, Terrence's hamster, previously sacrificed by John to open the portal, has also been restored to life and exits the coffin.
1992	Lethal Weapon 3	Riggs and Murtaugh are called to another building. As they debate whether to go in, the building explodes. Below is a freeze-frame of the explosion, Riggs remarks, "I hope no one saw us."
1992	Sister Act	During the closing credits, the group sings a cover of the Isley Brothers' "Shout".
1992	Aladdin	The Genie can be heard over the last few seconds of the end credits thanking the audience for coming, in a manner similar to a stand-up comic.
1992	King of Beggars	A collection of behind-the-scenes footage runs throughout the end credits.
1993	City Hunter	A collection of bloopers and outtakes is shown throughout the end credits.
1993	Free Willy	Willy re-appears swimming and popping his fin up.
1993	Super Mario Bros.	Two Japanese business executives propose making a video game based on Iggy and Spike, now trapped on Earth, who decide on the title The Super Koopa Cousins.
1993	Grumpy Old Men	A collection of bloopers and outtakes from the film.
1993	Kabhi Haan Kabhi Naa	The criminals hear the police siren and immediately scamper away as the credits roll.
1993	Dennis the Menace	During the closing credits, Dennis gets Alice's condescending coworker, Andrea, caught in the office copy machine.
1993	Gardish	Shiva's photo is shown on the criminal's display board and credits roll.
1993	Les Visiteurs	Tower guard says farewell.
1993	We're No Angels 2	As the credits are rolling, Chu shouts, "Hey, wait!" The credits rewind, and Chu is shown distressed in prison. He screams, "Stop right there! Why did this happen to me? Why?! Let me out!" The screen fades to black as the credits roll again from the start.
1994	Drunken Master II	A collection of behind-the-scenes footage from the film plays during the credits.
1994	Shrunken Heads	In a post-credits scene, Mitzi asks an older woman to go for a coffee, but as they are walking they come upon a fully zombified Vinnie and Big Moe cleaning up graffiti.
1994	Aladdin: The Return of Jafar	Abis Mal, who was still stuck in a tree, realized that with Jafar and the lamp gone, he will never get his third wish.
1994	Drunken Master III	A collection of behind-the-scenes footage from the film plays during the credits.
1994	The Adventures of Priscilla, Queen of the Desert	A kite created from a dress and a sex doll, relating from an earlier scene in the film, touches down at an Asian temple and is investigated by a monk.
1994	The Little Rascals	A collection of bloopers and outtakes from the film runs during the end credits.
1994	Muppet Classic Theater	As Gonzo and Rizzo close out the show while dancing with Kermit and Robin, the elves sing "Bad Shoe Blues (Blue Suede Shoes)" during the credits.
1994	From Beijing with Love	A collection of outtakes and bloopers runs silently during the end credits.
1994	Clerks	In the alternate ending (in which Dante is shot in a robbery), a post-credits scene shows Kevin Smith (as an undisclosed character) enter the store, step over Dante's body, and steal a pack of cigarettes.
1994	Insaniyat	Amar then moves towards a dying Shalu, and both the lovers breath their last in each other's arms, as the end credits roll.
1994	Fist of Legend	In the Hong Kong version, after the credits the crew is shown waving.
1994	Street Fighter	M. Bison's computer is reactivated from solar power and the revival system restores Bison again. His fist smashes through the rubble and a computer screen is shown selecting "World Domination: Replay".
1994	Little Big League	One member of the team fails to solve a math problem introduced earlier in the film.
1994	It's Pat	During the end credits, audio can be heard of Kathy hosting her radio show again, and the first caller is Kyle, whose obsession with Pat has driven him to cross-dressing.
1995	Getting Any?	In a post-credits scene, Asao jumps around Tokyo as the fly-man before getting impaled on Tokyo Tower.
1995	Grumpier Old Men	More bloopers and outtakes, as with the first film.
1995	Takkar	He then says "Everything has come to an end for good" and walks away with Mohini, as the prisoners look on and the credits begin to roll.
1995	Heavyweights	Tony Perkis (Ben Stiller), once he is fired as head of Camp Hope, becomes a door-to-door salesman for healing crystals. A would-be client slams the door in his face, meaning he won't be successful in his new job.
1995	Casper	Stretch briefly pops through the closing credits, singing the ending song as an imitation of Little Richard.
1995	Mighty Morphin Power Rangers: The Movie	A mid-credits scene features Goldar sitting in Lord Zedd's throne with Mordant serving him fruit, only for both to panic when Zedd and Rita Repulsa reappear, having been released after Ivan Ooze's death.
1995	Dilwale Dulhania Le Jayenge	As end credits roll, they are shown living happily as a couple in London.
1995	Dracula: Dead and Loving It	Dracula gets the very last "last" word in -- "Chervania!"
1996	Forbidden City Cop	A collection of bloopers and outtakes runs during the end credits.
1996	Mystery Science Theater 3000: The Movie	Mike, Crow and Servo riff the movie's credits.
1996	The Hunchback of Notre Dame	Hugo the Gargoyle chuckles and wishes the audience good night.
1996	Chain Reaction	The reactor explosion from the view of the helicopter in which Eddie escapes. As the explosion goes off, Agent Ford can be heard saying "Whoa!"
1996	Theodore Rex	The credits end with the words "SEE YA", or the movie's original logo on television airings.
1996	Aladdin and the King of Thieves	The Genie appears in several wacky poses over the end credits before screaming in terror that we've reached "the end!" Then he winks at the audience and flies off.
1996	Muppet Treasure Island	Long John Silver, marooned on Treasure Island, is forced to listen to bad jokes from a stone tiki.
1996	Space Jam	Bugs Bunny says the "That's all folks!" catchphrase. Porky Pig arrives and says "That's my line." Daffy Duck then interprets and attempts to say the catch phrase. However, he is pushed out of the screen by the aliens who then say the catch phrase. Michael Jordan lifts the screen and asks "Can I go home now?"
1996	James and the Giant Peach	An arcade game named "Spike the Aunts" is played. In the game, the player is the rhino and bashes each of the aunts as they rotate in a circle.
1996	High School High	A mid-credits scene shows a newsreader informing viewers about bacteria in movie popcorn. A post-credits scene shows that Marion Barry High is now Chuck Berry High, with the statue modified to resemble Berry.
1996	Jingle All the Way	After spending the whole movie trying to get a present for his son, Howard realizes he forgot to get his wife a Christmas gift.
1996	God of Gamblers 3: The Early Stage	A collection of bloopers and outtakes runs during the end credits.
1996	The God of Cookery	A collection of bloopers and outtakes runs during the end credits.
1996	Curdled	In a post-credits scene, Gabriela and Eduardo are driving in a car and Gabriela plays the tape that recorded the killer's last word after his beheading.
1997	Strays	A mid-credits scene shows Will in a new relationship in Rick's old apartment.
1997	Mr. Nice Guy	A collection of bloopers and outtakes runs during the end credits.
1997	Austin Powers: International Man of Mystery	As the end credits are rolling, Austin is shown photographing Vanessa in a studio. After he is "spent", he throws aways the camera and suggests that they go out on the town and swing.; In a second mid-credits scene, Austin is shown performing the song "BBC" with his band Ming Tea.
1997	Bean	In a post-credits scene set against a black backdrop, Bean enters and tells the audience, "Yes, I normally stay until the end as well." He rubs his hands and says "Bye" before walking out of frame. A moment later he reenters and says, "You can go now if you...if you wish." He checks his watch and says, "Dear me. Bye." He walks out of frame again, then moments later walks back through the frame in the other direction.
1997	Nothing to Lose	A mailman shows up at the gas station in Arizona and returns the money that T. Paul stole.
1997	Liar Liar	A collection of bloopers and outtakes runs during the credits.
1997	Hercules	Hades can be heard complaining over the last 16 seconds of the film that everyone except him had a happy ending.
1997	George of the Jungle	In the mid-credits scene, Ape travels to Las Vegas where he becomes a performer, and the final scenes show him using Max and Thor as stage props in his program; In the post credits scene, Ape's line "Ladies and gentlemen, I give you, the King of the Jungle!" followed by George doing his Tarzan yell and crashing into a tree while swinging with the vines, are heard played over both the Mandeville Films and the Walt Disney Pictures closing logos.
1997	Air Bud	During the credits, Cranfield grants custody to Josh as a ranting Snively, who runs at Josh to get Buddy back, is arrested and carried away by the police, while Josh and the rest of the citizens rejoice and gather around Buddy to welcome him home.
1997	Pardes	As end credits roll, Ganga and Arjun are back in the US, but this time as a married couple.
1997	Minsara Kanavu	In a post-credits scene, Thomas, now a priest, baptizes the daughter of Deva and Priya, who are married. Deva is looking after his father-in-law's business and Priya is working as a full-time singer. Guru has become a renowned music director but is facing charges of plagiarism; James redistributes his wealth to everyone.
1997	An Alan Smithee Film: Burn Hollywood Burn	Various bloopers and outtakes are shown intermittently throughout the end credits.
1997	RocketMan	The crew's flag pole on Mars is shown missing its flag. It is revealed that Fred's American flag boxers, which were earlier used as a replacement for the original flag, have been stolen and worn by a Martian.
1997	The Borrowers	During the credits, Potter is questioned by the police about the details of his seemingly absurd story and is then shown getting his mugshot taken.
1997	Mr. Magoo	A collection of outtakes and bloopers runs during the end credits.
1997	Nowhere	A blood-soaked Dark yells, "No!"
1998	Just the Ticket	A post-credits scene shows Zeus trying to sell an inflatable guitar toy to passers-by. A tribute reads: "In memory of Fred Asparagus 1947 - 1998".
1998	Bongwater	During the credits, a series of messages from David's answering machine plays with multiple people using various types of code to request marijuana.
1998	There's Something About Mary	A montage of scenes from the film, as well as outtakes involving the cast lip-syncing to The Foundations' song "Build Me Up Buttercup" runs during the end credits.
1998	BASEketball	Bob Costas and Al Michaels have a conversation only using the word "Dude". They pause suddenly, looking into each other's eyes, and appear to be about to kiss before the screen goes black.
1998	Snake Eyes	The camera stays fixed on one of the pillars in the stadium throughout the end credits, only to reveal the final fate of one of the characters in the last few seconds.
1998	Rush Hour	A collection of bloopers and outtakes runs during the end credits.
1998	Scooby-Doo on Zombie Island	Scooby-Doo was seen making peace with some of Simone's cats by giving them a saucer of milk.
1998	Dil Se..	In a mid-credits scene, the terrorists are shown to be caught by the CBI.
1998	Edge of Seventeen	After Angie finishes performing the song, she tells everyone to go home.
1998	Safe Men	Leflore walks into a restroom where Big Fat Bernie Gayle is standing at a urinal. Leflore places his mallet on the sink and stands at a urinal, then Bernie greets him, "Hey, how are ya?"
1998	The Rugrats Movie	The goat headbutts the Reptar Wagon, with Grandpa Pickles in it, and it goes out on the streets.
1998	A Bug's Life	Parodying the outtakes of movies like Cannonball Run and Grumpy Old Men, there is a collection of scenes showing the characters goofing up or horsing around on the "set" of the CGI-animated movie.
1998	Babe: Pig in the City	One of the singing mice thanks the audience for staying until the end.
1998	Curtain Call	During the end credits, Stevenson and Julia are shown moving into their new home and receiving a box full of copies of the newly published book Max and Lily: A Love Story.
1998	Blues Brothers 2000	Reverend Cleophus James (James Brown) performs "Please, Please, Please".
1998	Armageddon	During the beginning of the credits, there are multiple videos of Grace & A.J.'s wedding.
1999	Office Space	A collection of outtakes runs during the end credits.
1999	Star Wars Episode I: The Phantom Menace	In a moment of foreshadowing, Darth Vader's breathing can be heard over the last few seconds of the end credits.
1999	Austin Powers: The Spy Who Shagged Me	As the end credits are rolling, a scene is shown in which Scott Evil returns to The Jerry Springer Show and it is revealed that his mother is Frau Farbissina, who comes out as a secret guest and hugs him.; In a second mid-credits scene, Austin walks in on Felicity in bed with another man, who turns out to be Austin's past self. Both Austins are excited about the situation, confident that they have regained their mojo.; In a post-credits scene, a badly injured Mustafa calls for help from the bottom of the cliff from having been left there by Austin. He asks if the movie is over and if someone in the lobby could call an ambulance. He tries to walk using a makeshift splint and screams as his leg breaks further.
1999	South Park: Bigger, Longer & Uncut	A brief post-credits scene shows Ike eating a rat while waiting in the attic for his mom to return.
1999	Inspector Gadget	During the credits it is shown that Robo Brenda became an aerobics instructor, Sykes gets free from prison and becomes a member of a group for minions, Robo Gadget's body is still moving on the streets without his head until finally bumping into the screen, Penny receives a communicator watch along with Brain wearing a translator collar and Gadgetmobile marries the Beetle Car.; He also addresses the audience till the end of the credits.
1999	House on Haunted Hill	In a black-and-white post-credits scene, the spirits of the 1931 patients are seen torturing the Prices, presumably doomed to eternal damnation in the afterlife.
1999	From Dusk Till Dawn 3: The Hangman's Daughter	Decades later, Ambrose Bierce reveals to a bar patron that Quixtla actually bit him as they fell outside of the bar and that he is now a vampire. He rips the heart of the patron and bites it as the film ends.
1999	The Adventures of Elmo in Grouchland	After congratulating the audience for helping, Ernie tells Bert that it is time to go home, and as they walk off, Bert comments on how he knew everything was gonna be okay, to which Ernie responds "Yeah, right". Suddenly, Bert witnesses the credits fade in, then he exclaims to Ernie that there are credits. He then states that he wants to see who did the catering, to which he begins commenting on how good the toast was and how they cut off the crusts and everything. Ernie then tells him that it's time to feed his pigeons, then Bert and Ernie leave with Ernie saying, "Bye-bye", and laughing as the credits begin.
1999	Padayappa	During the credits, He prays for her soul to find peace.
1999	Toy Story 2	A collection of fake outtakes in the style of A Bug's Life is shown, including a moment where that movie's main character Flik and supporting character Heimlich show up on set, accidentally thinking that Pixar is filming A Bug's Life 2.
1999	Stuart Little	During the credits, Stuart accompanies George as he fixes his hair and gets dressed in the morning, all the while avoiding Snowbell, who is accidentally launched out the window.
1999	The Best Man	During the credits, On the dance floor, Harper thanks Robyn for her help and, in front of the entire wedding party, asks her to marry him; she says yes. The film ends as everyone dances the electric slide to the song "Candy" by Cameo.; Shelby and Quentin wake up in bed together, to their shock and disgust.
1999	10 Things I Hate About You	During the credits, I Want You To Want Me is sing.; Various bloopers and outtakes are shown during the last part of the credits. Assistant director Jeanine Anuel.
1999	Tenchi Forever! The Movie	Just before the credits roll, Tenchi and Ryoko enjoy a quiet moment together as the wind shakes the trees, mirroring a scene involving Tenchi's parents in Tenchi Muyo in Love.
1999	Dogma	In the end credits, outtakes with the respective actors are shown with their names. Read the further adventure of Jay and Silent Bob in Oni Press Comics. Find Jay and Silent Bob whoring their image on t-shirts, action figures, and other fine products produced exclusively by Graphitti Designs.
1999	Godzilla 2000	Godzilla's roar is heard in the U.S. version.

== See also ==
- List of films with post-credits scenes (2000s)
- List of films with post-credits scenes (2010s)
- List of films with post-credits scenes (2020s)
- Mid-credits and post-credits scenes in the Marvel Cinematic Universe
