= Post-credits scene =

Short sequence that appears after all or part of the final credits

A post-credits scene (also known as a stinger, end tag, or credit cookie) is a short teaser clip that appears after the closing credits have rolled and sometimes after a production logo of a film, TV show, or video game has run. It is usually either written for humor or to set up a sequel.

Sometimes, one or more mid-credits scenes are also inserted partly through the closing credits, typically for the purpose of maintaining the audience's attention so they do not need to wait for the entire credits roll to finish for a teaser.

== History ==
Post-credits scenes may have their origins in encores, an additional performance added to the end of staged shows in response to audience applause. Opera encores were common practice in the 19th century, when the story was often interrupted so a singer could repeat an aria, but fell out of favor in the 1920s due to rising emphasis on dramatic storytelling rather than vocal performance.

The first general release film to feature a post-credits scene is The Silencers, released in March 1966. The scene depicts lead character Matt Helm (played by Dean Martin) lying shirtless on what appears to be a rotating sofa along with 10 scantily-clad women. He kisses two women before rubbing his face and muttering, "Oh my god." During the scene, text overlays read "Coming Up Next" and "Matt Helm Meets Lovey Kravezit."

In 1979, The Muppet Movie uses a framing device in which the characters themselves watch the movie unfold in a theater. During the credits, the Muppets get up from their seats, talk to each other and joke around (thus incentivizing the real audience to stick around and see what happens next). In the final moment after the credits, Animal yells at the audience to "GO HOME!" before sighing "buh-bye" and passing out from exhaustion.

The use of such scenes gained popularity throughout the 1980s at the end of comedy films. In 1980, Airplane! ended with a callback to an abandoned taxicab passenger who was not a primary character. Enhanced application continued in 1985 with Young Sherlock Holmes (see below); in Masters of the Universe (1987), Skeletor's head emerges from the water at the bottom of the pit, saying "I'll be back!" The Muppet Movie also began a trend of using such scenes to break the fourth wall, even when much of the rest of the film had kept it intact. The scenes were often used as a form of metafiction, with characters showing an awareness that they were at the end of a film, and sometimes telling the audience directly to leave the theatre. Films using this technique include Ferris Bueller's Day Off (in which the title character frequently breaks the fourth wall during the film) and the musical remake of The Producers. The post-credits scene in the latter film also includes a cameo appearance by Producers screenwriter Mel Brooks.

Post-credits scenes also appeared on the long-running television show Mystery Science Theater 3000, introduced in the 1990 episode Rocket Attack U.S.A., continuing until the end of the series. With few exceptions, they highlighted moments from the films that were either particularly nonsensical or had simply caught the writers' attention.

== Contemporary film examples ==
Stingers lacking the metafictional aspects also gained prominence in the 1980s, although they were still primarily used for comedy films. Post-credits scenes became useful places for humorous scenes that would not fit in the main body of the film. Most were short clips that served to tie together loose ends—minor characters whose fates were not elaborated on earlier in the film, or plot lines that were not fully wrapped up. For example, all five Pirates of the Caribbean films include such scenes. Napoleon Dynamite features a stinger that reveals that Kip and LaFawnduh get married, a scene that was included in its wide release. In the film The Cannonball Run, bloopers from the film are shown. One of the stars in that picture, Jackie Chan, later featured outtakes during the credits of many of his films, often showing him getting injured doing his own stunts.

Even when post-credits scenes started to be used by films with little comedy development, the same format of giving closure to incomplete storylines or inconsequential characters remained in use. Using humor in such scenes is also still common for more serious films, as in the film Daredevil, in which Bullseye is shown after his defeat by Daredevil in a full body cast. Other films eschew the comedy in favor of a twist or revelation that would be out of place elsewhere in the film, as in X-Men: The Last Stand's post-credits scene in which Professor X is shown to be alive after his apparent death by the hands of the Phoenix. Another example is the stinger at the end of Harry Potter and the Chamber of Secrets which features a post-memory loss Lockhart. A third example occurs in Young Sherlock Holmes: during the entire credits, a sleigh is seen traveling in the Alps to a mountain inn; at the end of the credits, the passenger Professor Rathe (presumed to be dead), also known as "Eh-Tar", signs the register as "Moriarty".

With the rise of pre-planned film franchises, post-credits scenes have been adopted in order to prepare the audience for upcoming sequels, sometimes going so far as to include a cliffhanger ending where the main film is largely stand-alone. The cinematic release of The Matrix Reloaded demonstrated the sequel set-up use of stingers by featuring the trailer for The Matrix Revolutions.

Another example is the ending of the supernatural horror film Annabelle: Creation (2017), set in Romania, 1952 and see the character of Valak, the demon nun from The Conjuring 2 (2016) gliding towards the viewer before it darkens, teasing the spin-off prequel The Nun (2018).

Some films, including Richard Linklater's School of Rock, take the idea of the post-credits scene to its limit by running the credits during the main action of the film. In this example, the characters perform a song in the last minutes of the film, and the credits run inconspicuously until one character sings the line "the movie is over/but we're still on screen".

The Marvel Cinematic Universe has made extensive use of mid- and post-credits scenes which typically serve as a teaser for a future Marvel Studios film. For example, the post-credits scene of Iron Man 2 shows Phil Coulson locating a large hammer at the bottom of a crater in a New Mexico desert, thus teasing the release of Thor the following year. The post-credits sequence of Captain America: The Winter Soldier introduces the characters of Pietro and Wanda Maximoff, who join the franchise in Avengers: Age of Ultron. Other times these mid- and post-credits scenes serve primarily as gags, such as the post-credits scene in The Avengers, which has the Avengers eating shawarma in a derelict restaurant in the aftermath of the film's climactic battle, or Spider-Man: Homecoming, which features Captain America educating the audience on patience.

The credits of many Pixar films, including A Bug's Life (1998), Finding Nemo (2003), The Good Dinosaur (2015) and Finding Dory (2016) have included humorous mid-credits scenes. A Bug's Life (1998), for example, parodied the trend of bloopers at the end of movies by including fake blooper scenes of the characters making mistakes or goofing around on the "set" of the movie. Toy Story 2 (1999) and Monsters, Inc. (2001) followed suit. Other Pixar films, such as Cars (2006), Toy Story 3 (2010) and Inside Out (2015) have included an epilogue that plays during the credits.

An unusual use of the post-credits scene is to fulfill contractual obligations. In order to secure the personality rights to produce The Disaster Artist, a biopic of Tommy Wiseau, the filmmakers were obligated to include a cameo by Wiseau himself. This scene was filmed, but relegated to the post-credits sequence of the film.

== In video games ==
Video games, particularly those with complex stories, sometimes also use post-credits scenes. An early example is EarthBound, in which the main character receives a message that a main villain has escaped. A game may contain a scene or voiceover after the credits, of one or more characters speaking, revealing new information that gives a new perspective to the previous events as well as setting up part of the next game in the series. As the credits for modern games get longer, added cut scenes that maintain interest during the credits are becoming more common.

== See also ==
- List of films with post-credits scenes (before 2000)
- List of films with post-credits scenes (2000s)
- List of films with post-credits scenes (2010s)
- List of films with post-credits scenes (2020s)
