= The Game Plan (film) =

2007 film by Andy Fickman

- Theatrical release poster
- Directed by: Andy Fickman
- Screenplay by: Nichole Millard; Kathryn Price
- Story by: Nichole Millard; Kathryn Price; Audrey Wells
- Produced by: Mark Ciardi; Gordon Gray
- Starring: Dwayne Johnson; Madison Pettis; Kyra Sedgwick; Morris Chestnut; Roselyn Sanchez
- Cinematography: Greg Gardiner
- Edited by: Michael Jablow
- Music by: Nathan Wang
- Production companies: Walt Disney Pictures; Mayhem Pictures
- Distributed by: Buena Vista Pictures Distribution
- Release dates: September 23, 2007 (Hollywood); September 28, 2007 (United States)
- Running time: 110 minutes
- Country: United States
- Language: English
- Budget: $22 million
- Box office: $146.6 million

The Game Plan is a 2007 American sports family comedy film directed by Andy Fickman from a screenplay by Nichole Millard and Kathryn Price, based on a story conceived by Millard, Price, and Audrey Wells. The film stars Dwayne "The Rock" Johnson in the lead role; Madison Pettis; and Kyra Sedgwick. It follows a professional quarterback who finds out he has an eight-year-old daughter from a previous relationship.

It is the final film where Johnson is credited with his ring name. The Game Plan was released in the United States on September 28, 2007 to mixed reviews but was a commercial success, earning $146 million worldwide.

== Plot ==
In the last game of the American Football Federation's regular season between the Boston Rebels and the New York Dukes, Rebels quarterback Joe Kingman scores a touchdown after ignoring an open wide receiver, Travis Sanders. The next morning, eight-year-old Peyton Kelly arrives on Joe's doorstep saying that she is his biological daughter, and that his ex-wife, Sara, sent her there to meet him. His agent, Stella Peck, thinks this will be bad for his image and distracts him with the upcoming playoffs.

At the opening of his own restaurant/nightclub and bar, Joe inadvertently leaves without Peyton and is on the cover of a tabloid newspaper the next day. Stella decides Joe needs a new fatherly image. At a later press conference, the reporters make Joe miserable, until Peyton comes to his defense, saying that he is new to this and trying the best he can and that she thinks he is the best father in the world. Peyton then says that Joe has to repay her, so she has him take her to a ballet academy run by Monique Vasquez. Monique has Joe join their ballet performance to show him that ballet takes just as much athletic ability as football. Joe and Peyton begin their relationship after Peyton calls his arrogant and selfish behavior to his attention. Joe takes Peyton and her new friends to the mall where he begins to develop romantic feelings for Monique.

After defeating Denver in the Wild Card round, Indianapolis in the Divisional round, and finally Baltimore in the Conference round, the Rebels eventually make it to the championship game held in Arizona in a rematch with the Dukes. Stella offers Joe a $25 million sponsorship with Fanny's Burgers, a successful fast food restaurant run by Samuel Blake Jr., if he wins the game and mentions the product to the press. However, Joe soon begins to bond with Peyton. While at lunch with Joe and Monique at the Barking Crab, Peyton accidentally reveals that she was scheduled to go to a ballet school program for the month, but instead, she ran away to meet her father. Before Joe can fully process this, Peyton has an allergic reaction to the nuts in the dessert she was eating at the restaurant and Joe rushes her to the hospital; however, Peyton responds well to the treatment, and she is going to be fine.

Joe's former sister-in-law and Peyton's legal guardian, Karen Kelly, arrives to take her back home and reveals to Joe that Sara was killed in a car accident six months earlier. After Peyton overhears Stella talking on the phone complaining that she would be a huge distraction to Joe for his football career, Peyton decides that she wants to return home with Karen. Later, while going through Peyton's bag under her bed at his house, Joe finds some photos and reads a letter from Sara, saying that she hid Peyton away from Joe, as his career was just starting and she did not want Peyton to be a distraction to him.

At the game, Joe initially struggles but is buoyed by Peyton and Karen's arrival. Understanding Joe's earlier words about how he wants to remain in Peyton's life, Karen lets Peyton live with Joe. Near the end of the fourth quarter, Joe passes the ball to the running back, Jamal Webber, who gains positive yardage but fails to get out of bounds. Joe hurries his team to the line with the clock running and rushes ahead before being knocked out of bounds. With time for one last play, Joe throws a lob pass to Travis, who catches the pass, allowing the Rebels to win their first championship. In a post-game interview, Joe chooses to be with Peyton instead of accepting the sponsorship.

During the credits, Joe, Peyton, Monique, and other characters from the film perform "Burning Love" by Elvis Presley.

== Cast ==
- Dwayne Johnson as Joe Kingman
- Madison Pettis as Peyton Kelly
- Kyra Sedgwick as Stella Peck
- Morris Chestnut as Travis Sanders
- Roselyn Sánchez as Monique Vasquez
- Gordon Clapp as Coach Mark Maddox
- Paige Turco as Karen Kelly
- Brian J. White as Jamal Webber
- Hayes MacArthur as Kyle Cooper
- Jamal Duff as Clarence Monroe
- Kate Nauta as Tatianna
- Robert Torti as Samuel "Sam" Blake Jr.
- Lauren Storm as Nanny Cindy
- Elizabeth Chambers as Kathryn
- Marv Albert as himself
- Stuart Scott as himself
- Boomer Esiason as himself

== Production ==
The Game Plan was filmed in the Boston, Massachusetts area. The movie was also filmed in three stadiums across the country: Gillette Stadium in Foxboro, Invesco Field at Mile High in Denver, Colorado and Sun Devil Stadium in Tempe, Arizona.

Johnson's character taking ballet lessons is an indirect nod to Pro Football Hall of Fame wide receiver Lynn Swann, who took ballet lessons during his NFL career with the Pittsburgh Steelers. Swann later worked as a reporter for Disney-owned ABC and ESPN. Swann left Disney for a career in politics while The Game Plan was in pre-production.

== Reception ==
=== Critical response ===
Review aggregation website Rotten Tomatoes reports a 29% rating based on 103 reviews, and an average rating of 4.7/10. The website's critical consensus reads, "Despite The Rock's abundant charisma, The Game Plan is just another run-of-the-mill Disney comedy." On Metacritic, the film has a score of 44 out of 100, based on 23 critics, indicating "mixed or average reviews". Audiences polled by CinemaScore gave the film an average grade of "A" on an A+ to F scale.

=== Box office ===
Produced at an estimated cost of US$22 million, the film grossed $90,648,202 in the U.S. market and $55,942,785 in foreign ticket sales and $50,643,312 brought from DVD sales, in its stay on the Top 50 chart, sales producing a grand total gross of $197,234,299, clearly makes this film a profitable venture for Disney. It opened at #1 at the box office grossing $22,950,971 in its first weekend in 3,103 theaters and averaging $7,396 per venue. It closed on February 18, 2008, with a final domestic gross of $90,648,202.

== Home media ==
The Game Plan was released on DVD and Blu-ray on January 22, 2008. Through April 27, 2008, DVD rentals for The Game Plan were able to stay in the Top 50 chart, while earning more than $48 million.

== See also ==
- List of American football films
