= PKD Foundation =

US nonprofit organization

- Formation: 1982
- Tax ID no.: 43-1266906
- Purpose: Medical research
- Location: Kansas City, Missouri, United States
- Website: pkdcure.org

The PKD Foundation is a United States non-profit organization that funds research into polycystic kidney disease (PKD). It is the second-largest U.S.-based funder of PKD research after the National Institutes of Health. They have funded $30 million in research and leveraged over $1 billion in federal funding for PKD.

Founded in 1982 by Joseph H. Bruening and Jared J. Grantham, the PKD Foundation is headquartered in Kansas City, Missouri.

== Staff ==
The PKD Foundation is currently headed by Susan Bushnell, who formerly held leadership positions at Junior Diabetes Research International and the March of Dimes, among others.

== Legislation Supported ==
In June 2026, the organization supported the introduction in the US House of Representatives of the PKD Cures Act, the first bill ever specifically focused on PKD. The legislation, which was sponsored by Rep. Debbie Wasserman Schultz (D-FL), Rep. Carol Miller (R-WV), Rep. Emanuel Cleaver (D-MO), and Rep. Don Bacon (R-ME) strengthens and expands federal research efforts on PKD.
