= Mid-credits and post-credits scenes in the Marvel Cinematic Universe =

Samuel L. Jackson as Nick Fury in the MCU's first credit scene in Iron Man (2008)

Mid-credits and post-credits scenes have been used in various Marvel Cinematic Universe (MCU) media, since the beginning of the franchise with the 2008 film Iron Man. The use of such scenes as a whole has changed movie-goer expectations, and has received both praise and criticism. Individual scenes have been widely discussed, ranked, and criticized. In some cases, MCU films have multiple mid-credits and post-credits scenes, or excluded them entirely, and MCU television series have employed them after some episodes. As of VisionQuest (2026), the MCU has featured 94 post-credits scenes across 54 properties.

== Background ==
The first post-credits scene involving Marvel Comics characters occurred prior to the MCU, in the 2003 film Daredevil, showing the previously defeated villain Bullseye in a hospital bed, managing to impale a fly with a syringe. Another noted pre-MCU post-credits scene was in the 2006 film X-Men: The Last Stand, showing Charles Xavier / Professor X to be alive after his apparent death by the hands of the Phoenix earlier in the film. This has been described as "Marvel's first post-credit scene".

The MCU's first credits scene involved Nick Fury visiting Tony Stark to discuss the Avengers Initiative. On the decision to include Fury, Kevin Feige said, "We wanted Nick Fury to be the character to intertwine characters, but we didn't want to interrupt the movie." Since then, the MCU has made extensive use of mid- and post-credit scenes (often both) which typically serve as teasers for future Marvel Studios films. For example, the post-credits scene of Iron Man 2 (2010) shows S.H.I.E.L.D. agent Phil Coulson locating a large hammer at the bottom of a crater in a New Mexico desert, thus teasing the release of Thor the following year; while the post-credits sequence of Captain America: The Winter Soldier (2014) introduces the characters of Pietro and Wanda Maximoff, who join the franchise in Avengers: Age of Ultron (2015). Other times, these mid- and post-credits scenes serve primarily as gags, such as the post-credits scene in The Avengers (2012), which has the team eating shawarma in a derelict restaurant in the aftermath of the film's climactic battle, or Spider-Man: Homecoming (2017), which features Captain America educating the audience on patience. The Incredible Hulk (2008) does not include a proper post-credits scene; however, its final scene, in which Tony Stark approaches Thaddeus Ross in a bar, is often treated as one. Avengers: Endgame (2019) also does not feature a post-credits scene, instead having the credits end with the sound of clanging metal first heard in Iron Man.

In addition to such scenes attached to films, the MCU has had post-credit scenes in some of the television series, generally after the final episode of the series. The ubiquity of post-credit scenes in MCU properties was such that the producers of the television special Werewolf by Night (2022) felt the need to defend the absence of such a scene, noting that the final scene of the special itself had a feeling much like a typical post-credits scene, and that the characters were left not knowing what the future will bring. The post-credit scene for the MCU television series Hawkeye (2021)'s finale, "So This Is Christmas?", features the cast of the fictional Rogers: The Musical performing the number, "Save the City", first seen in a shorter form in the premiere episode, "Never Meet Your Heroes", with the full version being over four minutes long. The scene was received with sharply divided opinions by fans, as it did not advance any MCU storyline. Guardians of the Galaxy Vol. 2 (2017) and the television series She-Hulk: Attorney at Law (2022) are the projects with the largest number of post-credit scenes, featuring five, with She-Hulk including them in the first four episodes and the final episode.

== Scenes ==
The following table covers scenes featured in films, short films, television series, animated shorts, and television specials produced by Marvel Studios, and organized chronologically by original release date. As of VisionQuest (2026), the MCU has featured 94 post-credits scenes across 54 properties.

List indicators

- ^{OS} indicates this is a One-Shot.
- ^{SH} indicates this is a short.
- ^{SP} indicates this is a Special Presentation.

=== Phase One ===
Phase one credit scenes
Year	Title	Description of scene(s)
2008	Iron Man	S.H.I.E.L.D. director Nick Fury visits Tony Stark at home to discuss the Avengers Initiative.
2010	Iron Man 2	In a cut-down scene from Thor, S.H.I.E.L.D. agent Phil Coulson reports to Fury the discovery of Mjolnir at the bottom of a crater in a desert in New Mexico.
2011	Thor	Erik Selvig is taken to a S.H.I.E.L.D. facility, where Fury asks him to study the Tesseract, which Fury says may hold untold power. An invisible Loki prompts Selvig to agree, and he does.
2011	Captain America: The First Avenger	In a cut-down scene from The Avengers, Steve Rogers converses with Fury at a gym.
2012	The Avengers	The Other reports to his master, Thanos, about the Avengers' victory on Earth.; Exhausted in the aftermath of the Battle of New York, the Avengers silently eat shawarma in a derelict restaurant.
2012	Item 47^{OS}	Claire Wise spins in an office chair at S.H.I.E.L.D. Headquarters.

=== Phase Two ===
Phase two credit scenes
Year	Title	Description of scene(s)
2013	Iron Man 3	Stark finishes telling his story to Bruce Banner, who had fallen asleep near the beginning. Stark starts telling the story again.
2013	Agent Carter^{OS}	Dum Dum Dugan sits beside a pool with Howard Stark, marveling at two women wearing the newly created bikinis.
2013	Thor: The Dark World	Volstagg and Sif take the Reality Stone to Taneleer Tivan, The Collector. After the pair leave, Tivan expresses interest with the remaining five.; Thor returns to Earth and reunites with Jane Foster, then the scene shifts to show a frost monster still on the loose in London.
2014	All Hail the King^{OS}	In prison, Justin Hammer complains about Trevor Slattery and talks to his lover about the parallels between himself and Tony Stark.
2014	Captain America: The Winter Soldier	Hydra's Wolfgang von Strucker and Dr. List see twins Wanda and Pietro Maximoff, who are held in custody, experimenting with their powers.; Bucky Barnes visits his own memorial at the Smithsonian Institution.
2014	Guardians of the Galaxy	Baby Groot dances to music, but only when Drax is not looking.; The Collector sulks in his destroyed archive with two of his living exhibits: Cosmo the Spacedog and Howard the Duck.
2015	Avengers: Age of Ultron	Frustrated with his minions' lack of progress in collecting the Infinity Stones, Thanos decides to get the rest himself.
2015	Ant-Man	Hank Pym shows his daughter Hope van Dyne a prototype Wasp outfit.; In a cut-down scene from Captain America: Civil War, Rogers and Sam Wilson discuss what to do about Barnes. Wilson says he knows "a guy" who can help him.

=== Phase Three ===
Phase three credit scenes
Year	Title	Description of scene(s)
2016	Captain America: Civil War	T'Challa puts Barnes back into cryostasis in Wakanda until a cure for his mental programming can be found.; Peter Parker looks at the web shooters given to him by Tony Stark. The web-shooters emit a spider-signal.
2016	Doctor Strange	In a cut-down scene from Thor: Ragnarok, Dr. Stephen Strange receives Thor, and agrees to help him find Odin if he promises that Loki will no longer return to Earth.; Karl Mordo takes away Jonathan Pangborn's magic, stating that there are "too many sorcerers".
2017	Guardians of the Galaxy Vol. 2	Kraglin Obfonteri plays around with Yondu Udonta's whistle-powered Yaka arrow, accidentally stabbing Drax on his shoulder.; Stakar Ogord and Martinex reunite with their old teammates Charlie-27, Aleta Ogord, Mainframe, and Krugarr in Yondu's memory.; Ayesha reveals her plans to get revenge on the Guardians of the Galaxy, a being named "Adam".; A teenage Groot refuses to clean his room, much to Peter Quill's annoyance.; Stan Lee tells a rambling story to an audience of uninterested Watchers. The Watchers walk away as Lee calls after them.
2017	Spider-Man: Homecoming	In prison, Adrian Toomes encounters Mac Gargan and denies knowledge of Spider-Man's identity.; Rogers delivers a PSA to the audience about patience.
2017	Thor: Ragnarok	Thor's spaceship encounters an even larger spaceship, the Sanctuary II, which belongs to Thanos.; The overthrown Grandmaster is confronted by his former subjects in Sakaar.
2018	Black Panther	T'Challa speaks before the United Nations, vowing to share his country's resources with the world.; Barnes awakes from cryostasis in a hut in Wakanda, and thanks Shuri.
2018	Avengers: Infinity War	Before Fury disintegrates in the Blip along with Maria Hill, he uses a pager to call Carol Danvers.
2018	Ant-Man and the Wasp	Scott Lang is stuck in the Quantum Realm after Pym, Hope and Janet van Dyne disintegrate due to the Blip.; Lang's pet giant ant entertains itself by playing drums as the Emergency Broadcast System plays in the background.
2019	Captain Marvel	The Avengers monitor Fury's pager shortly before Danvers appears to ask where Fury is.; Goose climbs onto Fury's desk and regurgitates the Tesseract.
2019	Spider-Man: Far From Home	In a doctored video, Quentin Beck / Mysterio frames Spider-Man for his murder and exposes his identity as Peter Parker to the world.; "Fury" and "Hill" are revealed to be the Skrulls Talos and Soren in disguise, while the real Fury is in outer space.

=== Phase Four ===
Phase four credit scenes
Year	Title	Description of scene(s)
2021	WandaVision episode 7: "Breaking the Fourth Wall"	Monica Rambeau discovers the lair of Agatha Harkness but is caught by "Pietro".
2021	WandaVision episode 8: "Previously On"	S.W.O.R.D. director Tyler Hayward reactivates "The Vision", with a now all-white, reassembled original body.
2021	WandaVision episode 9: "The Series Finale"	Hayward is arrested while Rambeau is informed by a Skrull disguised as an FBI agent that a friend of her mother Maria wants to meet with her in space.; Maximoff hears her twin sons' cry for help while studying the Darkhold in her astral form in a remote mountain cabin.
2021	The Falcon and the Winter Soldier episode 5: "Truth"	Embittered by his discharge, and motivated by Lemar Hoskins' death, John Walker forges his own version of Captain America's shield, from scrap metal and his Medal of Honor, painted in the colors of the American flag.
2021	The Falcon and the Winter Soldier episode 6: "One World, One People"	After receiving a full pardon, Sharon Carter rejoins the CIA and makes a phone call to an unknown person, stating that she intends to use this access to sell government secrets and resources.
2021	Loki season 1, episode 4: "The Nexus Event"	Loki, having been "pruned" by the Time Variance Authority (TVA), awakens in the Void, and is met with four other Loki variants.
2021	Black Widow	After Natasha Romanoff's death, Yelena Belova encounters Contessa Valentina Allegra de Fontaine at Romanoff's grave and receives her next assignment to take down Clint Barton, the man "responsible" for Romanoff's death.
2021	What If...? season 1, episode 9: "What If... the Watcher Broke His Oath?"	In an alternate timeline, Captain Peggy Carter and Natasha Romanoff discover the Hydra Stomper armor with someone inside.
2021	Shang-Chi and the Legend of the Ten Rings	Wong and Shang-Chi speak with Banner and Danvers and discover that the ten rings are emitting a mysterious signal. Wong tells Shang-Chi and Katy that they should go home and get some rest, but instead all three are shown at a karaoke establishment singing "Hotel California" by the Eagles.; Xu Xialing becomes the new leader of the Ten Rings.
2021	Eternals	Thena, Makkari, and Druig are visited by the Eternal Eros, Thanos' brother, and his assistant Pip the Troll, who offer their help.; Dane Whitman opens an old chest inherited from his ancestors that contains the legendary Ebony Blade. At the same time, an off-screen Eric Brooks / Blade questions him whether he is ready for it.
2021	Hawkeye episode 6: "So This Is Christmas?"	The cast of the fictional Rogers: The Musical performs the number "Save the City".
2021	Spider-Man: No Way Home	Following the mid-credit scene in Venom: Let There Be Carnage, the universe-displaced Eddie Brock and his symbiote Venom have a conversation with a bartender and decide to find Spider-Man, but are suddenly returned to their universe due to Strange's spell, unknowingly leaving behind a part of the symbiote.; A teaser trailer for Doctor Strange in the Multiverse of Madness is shown in the post-credits scene.; In The More Fun Stuff Version of the film released in September 2022, this trailer is replaced by a scene of Betty Brant highlighting the last four academic years of Midtown School, with Peter Parker being absent or obscured from all photographs due to Strange's spell to erase everyone's memories of Spider-Man's identity.
2022	Doctor Strange in the Multiverse of Madness	Strange is approached by the sorceress Clea, who warns him that his actions have triggered an incursion that he must help stop. Strange (having developed a third eye due to using of the Darkhold of his Sinister counterpart's universe and dreamwalking into his Defender counterpart's corpse) follows her into the Dark Dimension.; The Pizza Poppa vendor of Earth-838, who had been bewitched by Strange into beating himself up for three weeks, is shown punching himself until Strange's spell wears off. The vendor laughs and yells "It's over!" at the audience's direction.
2022	Moon Knight episode 6: "Gods and Monsters"	The Ammit-possessed Arthur Harrow is taken out of a psychiatric hospital and brought into a limousine where he is killed by Jake Lockley, the third alter of Marc Spector, who is still working with Khonshu.
2022	Ms. Marvel episode 1: "Generation Why"	At the Damage Control Headquarters, agents P. Cleary and Sadie Deever discover a recording of Kamala Khan's incident at the New Jersey AvengerCon upon social media, and plan to capture her.
2022	Ms. Marvel episode 6: "No Normal"	In a cut-down scene from The Marvels, Kamala's power-bestowing bangle emits a strange glow before she suddenly switches places with Danvers.
2022	Thor: Love and Thunder	Zeus is revealed to have survived his encounter with Thor and plans his revenge by sending his son Hercules to kill him.; Following her death, Foster enters Valhalla and is greeted by Heimdall, who thanks her for looking over his son Axl.
2022	I Am Groot season 1, episode 5: "Magnum Opus"^{SH}	Groot's drawing of the Guardians is seen adrift in space.
2022	She-Hulk: Attorney at Law episode 1: "A Normal Amount of Rage"	Banner reveals to Jennifer Walters that Rogers had lost his virginity to a girl on the USO tour in 1943, to Walters' delight.
2022	She-Hulk: Attorney at Law episode 2: "Superhuman Law"	Walters uses her She-Hulk form to help her parents with chores around the house like mounting a flat-screen TV and moving large bottles of water.
2022	She-Hulk: Attorney at Law episode 3: "The People vs. Emil Blonsky"	Walters twerks with Megan Thee Stallion.
2022	She-Hulk: Attorney at Law episode 4: "Is This Not Real Magic?"	Wong and Madisynn King watch television on Wong's couch.
2022	She-Hulk: Attorney at Law episode 9: "Whose Show Is This?"	Emil Blonsky, having been returned to prison for violating his parole by becoming Abomination, is again broken out by Wong.
2022	Black Panther: Wakanda Forever	Shuri travels to Haiti where she burns her funeral ceremonial robe, finally allowing herself to grieve and mourn T'Challa. There, she is met on a beach by Nakia and learns that Nakia and T'Challa have a son, Toussaint, whom Nakia has been raising in secret far from the pressure of the throne. Toussaint reveals that his Wakandan name is T'Challa.
2022	The Guardians of the Galaxy Holiday Special^{SP}	Rocket and Cosmo are decorating Groot as a Christmas tree; Groot drops his arms, causing the decorations to fall off, leading Cosmo to say that Groot has ruined Christmas, and Rocket to break the fourth wall and say that now they will need to do another special.

=== Phase Five ===
Phase five credit scenes
Year	Title	Description of scene(s)
2023	Ant-Man and the Wasp: Quantumania	Following the death of Kang the Conqueror, numerous other variants of Kang, including Immortus, Rama-Tut and Centurion, commiserate over his death and, concerned by Earth-616's increasing interest in the Multiverse, plan their multiversal uprising.; In a cut-down scene from the Loki season 2 episode "1893", Loki and Mobius M. Mobius encounter another Kang variant, named Victor Timely, in a branched timeline on Earth in 1893.
2023	Guardians of the Galaxy Vol. 3	The new Guardians—Rocket, a much larger Groot, Cosmo, Kraglin, Adam Warlock, Phyla, and Blurp—are shown discussing their favorite songs from Earth while waiting in a desert on another planet to undergo a new mission.; Quill, having returned to Earth and reunited with his grandfather Jason, debates with him during breakfast.
2023	I Am Groot season 2, episode 3: "Groot's Snow Day"^{SH}	Groot drinks a hot chocolate, which is too hot. He swipes the mug off the table and it smashes, causing Rocket to shout.
2023	Loki season 2, episode 1: "Ouroboros"	Sylvie emerges from a time portal on Earth in 1982 and enters a McDonald's restaurant, where she says she wants to try everything.
2023	The Marvels	Monica Rambeau awakens in a hospital-like room and is shocked to see her deceased mother, Maria Rambeau, next to her. However, Maria does not recognize her, when Dr. Hank McCoy / Beast enters and tells Monica she was found in space by Binary (Maria) and that they believe Monica is in a parallel universe.
2023	What If...? season 2, episode 4: "What If... Iron Man Crashed into the Grandmaster?"	The still alive Grandmaster begs Topaz to collect his puddle form.
2024	Echo episode 5: "Maya"	Wilson Fisk, on a plane back to New York, arranges a meeting of the heads of all of the crime syndicates, and then watches a news report indicating that New York voters would support an outsider who is "a bare-knuckle brawler" in the upcoming mayoral election.
2024	Deadpool & Wolverine	Wade Wilson returns to the TVA headquarters to clear his name regarding Johnny Storm's death by unveiling footage of Johnny having actually said the insults Wilson quoted about Cassandra Nova.
2025	Captain America: Brave New World	Samuel Sterns is visited by Sam Wilson at the Raft. He warns Wilson of an incoming threat from other universes.
2025	Daredevil: Born Again season 1, episode 9: "Straight to Hell"	Frank Castle, imprisoned by Wilson Fisk in a cage in a facility holding vigilantes and his political enemies, tricks a guard into shaking his hand. He breaks the guard's arm and escapes.
2025	Thunderbolts*	Alexei Shostakov is in a grocery store admiring the fact that the New Avengers team has been put on a Wheaties box and unsuccessfully tries to get a shopper to buy a box.; In a cut-down scene from Avengers: Doomsday, 14 months since the end of Thunderbolts*, the New Avengers are operating in the Watchtower and are discussing how Sam Wilson, and most of the public, does not approve of the team's use of the name, with Wilson threatening legal action. Yelena Belova notes there is a "huge space crisis" the New Avengers are uninformed about before the team gets an alert of an interdimensional spacecraft entering Earth-616, which is revealed to be the Fantastic Four's.
2025	Ironheart, episode 6: "The Past Is the Past"	Parker Robbins goes to see Zelma Stanton at her family's magic shop to ask her to help him with magic.

=== Phase Six ===
Phase six credit scenes
Year	Title	Description of scene(s)
2025	The Fantastic Four: First Steps	Four years since the end of The Fantastic Four: First Steps, Sue Storm finishes reading a book to Franklin Richards and decides to read him another. She picks up another book on the counter and returns only to see a man in a green hood and a metal mask, Victor von Doom, interacting with Franklin.; The theme song intro of The Fantastic Four Power Hour television series plays on a television. H.E.R.B.I.E. then turns the dial of the television, turning it off.
2026	Spider-Man: Brand New Day	The Spidey Tracker app made by Ned Leeds is seen, and it detects a new Spider-Man sighting with an unknown location. The app begins to glitch as the map zooms away from Earth.
2026	Avengers Endgame: Encore	Banner, who is self-isolating in a military complex, is "collected" by Victor von Doom.; The Time Variance Authority detect numerous "incursions" between universes as the multiverse begins to collapse.; Doom forges his mask.
2026	VisionQuest episode 8: "Forever"	Ultron stands in the Horton mansion holding Jocasta's source code.; Continuing from a scene in Doctor Strange in the Multiverse of Madness, Doom arrives to save Wanda Maximoff after she collapses Mount Wundagore, intending to claim her power.

== Reception ==
The MCU has been described as having "made the post-credits scene commonplace", and as being the media that "uses them to the greatest effect", and having "reset moviegoers' expectations about when a film is actually over". Post-credit scenes often contain humor, or Easter eggs referencing matters ranging from the significant to the obscure that would be of interest to fans of the media. Peter Cullen Bryan "examines the interplay within modern superhero blockbusters, which grants the geek a degree of social power: Marvel's use of the post-credits scene is indicative of the larger process, creating a ritual enacted by fans, who interpret the scene for the uninitiated". In the MCU, these scenes often "tease future plotlines and characters that will be introduced down the road".

Post-credit scenes have also often been used in the MCU to highlight new releases that are still forthcoming at the time that the media containing the post-credit scene is released, a practice that has been criticized as detracting from the importance of the films to which the scenes are attached. Such scenes are also criticized on the grounds that they usurp meaningful film endings with cheap gags; a review in The Guardian stated that "if you can't find a way to incorporate it into the actual movie instead of ruining its afterglow, maybe it wasn't meant to be in there". A 2022 review in Total Film observed that "[t]he recent wave of Marvel post-credits scenes do not seemingly lead into any known sequel, instead offering a scattergun approach to the future". They felt that a road map was needed for where the credit scenes were heading and that "Marvel popularized the post-credits phenomenon – now it needs to reinvent them." Multiple other critics have shared the same opinion about the growing number of unresolved teases from Phases Four and Five. Screen Rant added that one of the major issues with the credit scenes in Phase Four and early Phase Five was the amount of new characters introduced. The MCU's first three phases introduced eight new characters over the eleven-year span, while Phases Four and Five had already introduced more by early 2023, which was only a two-year span from the beginning of Phase Four. Writing for Digital Spy, David Opie singled out the credit scene in The Marvels featuring Beast by saying that it could be years before the scene pays off with there being no plans in the near future for a live action X-Men project. He said "the X-Men are a huge deal and it makes sense that their full-on return might take some time", but added that the issue is this was not the first time that Marvel played the long game with their credit scene teases and that there have been many huge developments over the recent years, "then never mentioned again". Nick Staniforth from /Film said the post-credits scene for Thunderbolts* was a "tease-worthy moment" and harkened back to the "classic MCU post-credit moments we've missed these past few years".

== Marvel Comics characters outside the MCU ==
A number of films, television series, and other media not occurring in the MCU, but featuring characters from Marvel Comics, have also had post-credit scenes. In some cases, the relationship between these properties is blurred because the characters have later appeared in the MCU, or because the post-credit scenes themselves implicate events in the MCU.

=== Marvel films outside the MCU ===
In the 2003 film Daredevil, the previously defeated villain Bullseye is shown to be in a hospital bed, managing to impale a fly with a syringe. In the 2006 film, X-Men: The Last Stand, Charles Xavier is similarly shown to be alive after his apparent death by the hands of the Phoenix earlier in the film. Screen Rant later described this as "Marvel's first post-credit scene", and noted that this is one of several significant post-credits scenes that were not followed up on in later films. The post-credits scene in Deadpool (2016) featured the title character, who is known for breaking the fourth wall, appearing in a bathrobe and telling the audience that the movie is over—identical to the post-credits scene in the 1986 comedy, Ferris Bueller's Day Off—while also saying "What? Are you expecting Sam Jackson to show up in a eye patch?", referencing the appearance of Nick Fury in the Iron Man post-credits scene. In Sony's Spider-Man Universe (SSU) film Venom: Let There Be Carnage (2021), Eddie Brock and Venom decide to take a tropical vacation while they ponder their next steps. As Venom tells Brock about the symbiotes' knowledge of other universes, a blinding light transports them from their hotel room to another room where they watch J. Jonah Jameson talk about Spider-Man's identity as Peter Parker on television, as was previously revealed in Spider-Man: Far From Home. Similarly, in Morbius (2022), the first mid-credits scene features Adrian Toomes finding himself transported to the SSU, while in the second, Toomes approaches Dr. Michael Morbius, suggesting they should form a team; and in Venom: The Last Dance (2024), a mid-credits scene shows Knull exclaiming that the universe is no longer safe from him, and a post-credit scene shows a bartender escaping Area 51 in a panic, while a cockroach appears to be fused with the Venom symbiote.

=== Other media outside the MCU ===
In Lego Marvel's Avengers (2016), a video game primarily based on the plot of The Avengers and Avengers: Age of Ultron, there are a number of MCU-inspired scenes during the credits. The first scene parodies the mid-credits scene from The Avengers, though with Thanos playing various 'Awesome Mix' cassette tapes. The second scene parodies the post-credits scene from that film, with the Avengers sitting around a restaurant table, but with the Hulk hoarding the available food. The third scene shows Stan Lee as a janitor cleaning up the aftermath of Ultron's attack on Avengers Tower in Age of Ultron. He lifts Mjölnir and accidentally causes a blast of lightning.

The Good, the Bart, and the Loki, a 2021 Disney+ short featuring The Simpsons and tied into the first season of Loki, features a mid-credits scene of Loki disguised as Moe Szyslak giving patrons at Moe's Tavern free drinks. In two post-credits scenes, Ralph Wiggum as the Hulk smashes Loki similarly to a scene from The Avengers, and Loki stands before Ravonna Renslayer at the Time Variance Authority, where she finds him guilty of his various crimes, such as crossing over to the Simpsons universe. Shania Russell of /Film noted that the scene "pokes fun at the MCU post-credits scenes with an extended credits reel that hides a good couple of reference heavy clips".

== See also ==
- List of films with post-credits scenes
