= Don't Touch That Dial =

- WandaVision episode
- Promotional poster for WandaVision highlighting elements of the 1960s setting seen in this episode
- Episode no.: Episode 2
- Directed by: Matt Shakman
- Written by: Gretchen Enders
- Cinematography by: Jess Hall
- Editing by: Zene Baker
- Original release date: January 15, 2021
- Running time: 37 minutes

Cast
- Asif Ali as Norm; Emma Caulfield Ford as Dottie; Jolene Purdy as Beverly; Amos Glick as Dennis the mailman; David Payton as Herb; David Lengel as Phil Jones; Zac Henry as the beekeeper; Victoria Blade as commercial woman; Ithamar Enriquez as commercial man

Episode chronology
← Previous "Filmed Before a Live Studio Audience"	Next → "Now in Color"

"Don't Touch That Dial" is the second episode of the American television miniseries WandaVision, based on Marvel Comics featuring the characters Wanda Maximoff / Scarlet Witch and Vision. It follows the couple as they try to conceal their powers while living an idyllic suburban life in the town of Westview, New Jersey. The episode is set in the Marvel Cinematic Universe (MCU), sharing continuity with the films of the franchise. It was written by Gretchen Enders and directed by Matt Shakman.

Paul Bettany and Elizabeth Olsen reprise their respective roles as Vision and Wanda Maximoff from the film series, with Teyonah Parris, Debra Jo Rupp, and Kathryn Hahn also starring. Development began by October 2018, and Shakman joined in August 2019. The episode pays homage to sitcoms of the 1960s, particularly Bewitched, including an animated opening sequence in the Hanna-Barbera-style of that series' own intro. Filming took place at Pinewood Atlanta Studios in Atlanta, Georgia, and in Los Angeles, mostly in black-and-white but the episode transitions to color at the end; this was done with visual effects that were designed to look like 1960s optical printer technology had been used.

"Don't Touch That Dial" was released on the streaming service Disney+ on January 15, 2021. Critics praised the performances of Olsen and Bettany, particularly their physical comedy, and found the episode enjoyable, but some criticized the lack of overall plot developments. It received several accolades, including two Primetime Emmy Award nominations.

== Plot ==
In a black-and-white 1960s setting, Wanda Maximoff and Vision hear strange noises outside their house. The next day, they prepare their magician act for a neighborhood talent show to help them fit in with the neighbors, before Vision attends the neighborhood watch meeting with the male neighbors. Wanda sees an in-color toy helicopter outside the house, but is distracted by Agnes, who invites her to a women's gathering hosted by Dottie Jones, the snooty leader of the neighborhood. There, Maximoff befriends Geraldine.

The men in the neighborhood watch meeting welcome Vision, who accidentally swallows a piece of gum that is offered to him. Vision's synthezoid system is unable to digest the gum, and it causes him to become "intoxicated". Maximoff speaks with Dottie after the gathering, and a voice calls out to her through a radio asking her who is responsible for causing her situation. (Note: The voice on the radio is revealed to be that of FBI agent Jimmy Woo in the series' fourth episode, "We Interrupt This Program".) Once again, she is distracted as Dottie asks who she is before the radio breaks and Dottie's glass shatters. She bleeds in color but quickly ignores this event.

When the "intoxicated" Vision arrives at the talent show, he inadvertently reveals his superpowers. Maximoff uses her own abilities to make Vision look like he is performing simple magic tricks including sawing her in half. Their performance is well received and they are awarded Comedy Performance of the Year by Dottie. When they return home, Maximoff inexplicably becomes pregnant. As she and Vision are about to celebrate, they hear the noise outside again and walk out to find a beekeeper climbing out of the sewers. Disturbed by this, Maximoff "rewinds" the events on-screen to her pregnancy reveal and the world around them suddenly changes to a 1970s color-filled aesthetic.

A commercial during the WandaVision program advertises Strücker watches with the Hydra logo on them.

== Production ==
=== Development ===
By October 2018, Marvel Studios was developing a limited series starring Elizabeth Olsen's Wanda Maximoff and Paul Bettany's Vision from the Marvel Cinematic Universe (MCU) films. In August 2019, Matt Shakman was hired to direct the miniseries. He and head writer Jac Schaeffer executive produced alongside Marvel Studios' Kevin Feige, Louis D'Esposito, and Victoria Alonso. Feige described the series as part sitcom, part "Marvel epic", paying tribute to many eras of American sitcoms. The second episode, "Don't Touch That Dial", was written by Gretchen Enders and pays homage to 1960s sitcoms Bewitched and I Dream of Jeannie.

=== Writing ===
The series' writers were aware that the second episode of a series is often more difficult to write than the first due to needing to re-state the intentions of the series without just repeating the plot of the first episode. This was made more difficult by the fact that the audience and the characters do not know the meaning behind the series' mysteries during this episode. They decided early on that they wanted Maximoff and Vision to cement themselves as members of the Westview community in the episode, with Schaeffer explaining that it is Maximoff's desire to fit in with their neighbors and so the episode explores her and Vision trying to fit within the "masculine-feminine spheres" of Westview. The writers could not settle on what the set piece of the episode would be to facilitate this, and spent longer working it out than on any other episode of the series.

Enders went through multiple iterations of the script, with one version having Vision join the neighborhood watch while Wanda participated in a Rose Competition to see who had the best rose bushes in town. Enders was inspired by the film Mean Girls (2004) for the group of women that Maximoff spends time with, especially for their leader Dottie. The writers wanted to bring Vision and Maximoff back together at the end of the episode, and Enders suggested that the set piece actually be a community talent show after watching several talent show-based episodes of The Dick Van Dyke Show while researching for the series. This allowed the episode to end with all of the characters together, and with Maximoff and Vision performing together. Though the Rose Competition was removed from the episode, roses are still mentioned in dialogue as a reference to this. Schaeffer later said that using a talent show was "so self-evident" with hindsight since I Dream of Jeannie and Bewitched often had episodes featuring a performance or talent show. The writers wanted to explore new sides to Vision in the series and especially wanted to see him acting "drunk" and goofy. Schaeffer suggested that this might happen if something was "gumming up the works" inside Vision, and staff writer Megan McDonnell came up with the idea that Vision swallow actual gum to cause that behavior.

External videos
- Strücker | Marvel Studios' WandaVision | Disney+ presents the full Strücker commercial from the episode, YouTube video from Marvel Entertainment's channel

The series features fake commercials that Feige said would indicate "part of the truths of the show beginning to leak out", with "Don't Touch That Dial" including a commercial that is advertising Strücker watches with the slogan "Strücker. He'll make time for you." The face of the watch says "Swiss Made", "Hydra", and "1000M", along with the Hydra logo. Strücker is a reference to Baron Wolfgang von Strucker, who experimented on Maximoff in the MCU films to give her her powers. Brenton Stewart at Comic Book Resources said the watch ticking in the commercial gave it an "unsettling feeling of a bomb about to go off", and pointed out the period-accurate sexist nature of the commercial which is similar to the fake commercial in the series' first episode.

=== Casting ===
The episode stars Paul Bettany as Vision, Elizabeth Olsen as Wanda Maximoff, Teyonah Parris as Geraldine, Debra Jo Rupp as Mrs. Hart, and Kathryn Hahn as Agnes. Also appearing as residents of Westview are Asif Ali as Norm, Emma Caulfield Ford as Dottie, Jolene Purdy as Beverly, Amos Glick as the mailman Dennis, David Payton as Herb, and David Lengel as Phil Jones. Zac Henry portrays the beekeeper, while Victoria Blade and Ithamar Enriquez play the man and woman in the Strücker commercial. Randall Park makes an uncredited voice cameo appearance as Jimmy Woo, as revealed by the series' fourth episode, "We Interrupt This Program".

=== Design ===
Shakman and cinematographer Jess Hall put together a collection of images from existing series that influenced the framing, composition, and color of the episode's sitcom setting, and Hall created a specific color palette of 20 to 30 colors for the episode based on those reference images so he could control the "visual integrity in color" of the episode. Hall worked with production designer Mark Worthington and costume designer Mayes C. Rubeo to ensure that the sets and costumes for the episode matched with his color palette. Worthington's team had to learn how different colors work when filmed in black-and-white, and did three days-worth of color tests. When shooting scenes in black-and-white, Bettany was painted blue, rather than Vision's maroon color, since the blue appeared better in the grayscale image.

Makeup head Tricia Sawyer used her experience working on the 1960s-set series Mad Men and hair stylist Karen Bartek drew on her past sitcom work. Both previously worked on several MCU films, and it was important to Bartek that the color of Maximoff's hair, as revealed at the end of the episode, match what was seen in the recent MCU films despite the change in style. Wigs were used for the hair styles in the episode to allow it to be filmed at the same time as other episodes without the actors' hair having to be re-styled to change between eras. Sawyer said the "nails, the shapes, [and] organizing the background" were all important elements of the period setting.

=== Filming and editing ===
Soundstage filming occurred at Pinewood Atlanta Studios in Atlanta, Georgia, with Shakman directing, and Hall serving as cinematographer. Backlot and outdoor filming occurred in Los Angeles when the series resumed production after being on hiatus due to the COVID-19 pandemic. "Don't Touch That Dial" was filmed in black-and-white, using a single-camera setup, and tungsten lights that were common for the 1960s era. Hall said the 1960s was moving towards high-contrast film stock and away from the low-contrast, softer film stock of the 1950s, so he used lighting to try to create a similar difference between the 1950s-set first episode and this one. Hall used a Big Eye 10K lighting tool for the episode which was predominantly used during the 1960s, but he had to diffuse the light slightly because it appeared harsher on the series' digital cameras than it would have on the film cameras of the time. A 4:3 aspect ratio was also used, and Hall chose lenses from Panavision with an "even falloff around the edges" that worked well in the square ratio and was period-appropriate. He made two "special portrait lenses" for Olsen to try to mimic the "beautiful kinds of close-ups that they did of the leading ladies" in the 1960s, which he gave as an example of that era being more "cinematic" than the 1950s. Hall was excited to use a film noir style for the episode's fake commercial.

The episode's laugh track was not recorded live as was done for the first, and Shakman said they "were not super conscious" of when they needed to pause during filming for the track to be added later. On set, the special effects team moved props with wire rigs and used camera tricks to create the effect of Maximoff's magic, as was done in series like Bewitched and I Dream of Jeannie. Editor Zene Baker used rewind effects and wipe transitions in the episode. He initially used a spin wipe for one scene transition because he felt it was period appropriate, but Feige later questioned this in a review of the episode. They were unable to find an example of the spin wipe in Bewitched or other series of the era that they reviewed, so Baker replaced it with a traditional wipe. Jump cuts were used to depict Maximoff magically changing clothes, with a shot of Olsen freezing in one position cut with a shot of her in the same position in a different costume. Her stand-in copied the position while Olsen got changed in between the shots. As another reference to Bewitched, Olsen unsuccessfully attempted to wiggle her nose like star Elizabeth Montgomery did in that series. Instead, Olsen uses a pointing motion for Maximoff's magic.

The women's club meeting in the episode was originally meant to be filmed indoors, but because of COVID-19 restrictions, it was changed to a pool-side setting. Co-executive producer Mary Livanos believed the "cute club" design from Worthington was ultimately a better choice because it gave a "deeper view into Westview" than originally planned. To portray "drunk" Vision at the talent show at the end of the episode, Bettany took inspiration from Dick Van Dyke's drunk acting in The Dick Van Dyke Show, as well as British comedians Dudley Moore, Rik Mayall, and John Cleese. Shakman used lenses, lighting, and sound design to change the mood for moments when something goes wrong with Maximoff's illusion, inspired by The Twilight Zone and the works of David Lynch. He felt the transition to these moments from the sitcom scenes was "very dramatic".

=== Animation and visual effects ===
Typeface used for the WandaVision program's opening sequence, inspired by Bewitched

The episode features an animated opening title sequence, as well as several animated moments throughout, created by Titmouse, Inc. The opening is in the style of Hanna-Barbera's animated Bewitched opening, with the sequence's characters designed by Marvel Studios' director of visual development Andy Park. Shakman noted that the opening evolved and went through many revisions over time. Tara DeMarco served as the visual effects supervisor for WandaVision, with the episode's visual effects created by Monsters Aliens Robots Zombies (MARZ), capital T, Framestore, RISE, The Yard VFX, SSVFX, and Lola VFX.

DeMarco used Vision's introduction in Avengers: Age of Ultron (2015) as the definitive version of the character when approaching the visual effects for him in WandaVision. Bettany wore a bald cap and face makeup on set to match Vision's color, as well as tracking markers for the visual effects teams to reference. Complex 3D and digital makeup techniques were then used to create the character, with sections of Bettany's face replaced with CGI on a shot-by-shot basis; the actor's eyes, nose, and mouth were usually the only elements retained. MARZ was responsible for creating Vision in the series' first three episodes. DeMarco said contemporary visual effects were used to remove wires and smooth cuts. Shots of Vision changing between his human and synthezoid forms and using his abilities—like phasing a hat through his body—mimicked period-appropriate effects, with "puffs of smoke and starry glitter" added by MARZ. To give Vision a more "wholesome" look, the digital contact lenses used in the films and later episodes were not added to Bettany's eyes in the first three episodes, and his eyelashes were not digitally removed as they usually are.

The "color bloom" effect at the end of the episode, when it transitions from black-and-white to color, was intended to look like it could have been made using 1960s effects. Framestore used a mixture of 2D and 3D effects to separate the color channels of the images, warp them, and recombine them, inspired by the way that different layers of film can be treated and exposed multiple times using optical printers. Framestore supervisor Nick Tanner researched this technology for the sequence, and while DeMarco said the final effect would have been difficult to accomplish in the 1960s, she felt it was "true to the principles" of the era. The sequence also includes star effects, which were designed to look like they had been painted directly onto the film which is how that kind of animation would have been achieved in that era. To help with this appearance, Framestore used the hand-drawn animation technique of creating the effects "on twos"—one frame of animation for every two frames of film—to give them a "stuttery, irregular appearance".

=== Music ===
External audio
- WandaVision! (From "WandaVision: Episode 2"/Audio Only) presents the full theme song from the episode by Robert Lopez and Kristen Anderson-Lopez, YouTube audio-only video from MarvelMusicVevo's channel

The episode's theme song, "WandaVision!", was written by Kristen Anderson-Lopez and Robert Lopez. "WandaVision" is the only lyric in the song, as Anderson-Lopez and Lopez wanted to emulate the minimalist, repetitive, "cool jazz Bebop-inspired" theme songs of 1960s television series. They also gave "Mah Nà Mah Nà" by Piero Umiliani and the works of Dave Brubeck as influences.

Composer Christophe Beck chose to emulate some of the instrumentation and style of the theme song for the episode's score, which he did not do for the first episode. This involved introducing a rhythm section, including bongos, and a "Latin feel" to the classical orchestra that he was already using for the series, with further inspiration taken from Bewitched and I Dream of Jeannie. The episode features "Help Me, Rhonda" by the Beach Boys. A soundtrack album for the episode was released digitally by Marvel Music and Hollywood Records on January 22, 2021, featuring Beck's score. The first track is the theme song by Anderson-Lopez and Lopez.

WandaVision: Episode 2 (Original Soundtrack)
No.	Title	Length
1.	"WandaVision!" (featuring Kristen Anderson-Lopez, Sara Mann, Jessica Rotter, Cindy Bourquin, Elyse Willis, Laura Dickinson, Robert Lopez, Eric Bradley, Greg Whipple, Jasper Randall & Gerald White)	0:53
2.	"Rehearsal"	0:55
3.	"Unwelcome Visitor"	0:59
4.	"Strucker"	0:37
5.	"Giddy Up"	0:32
6.	"Beekeeper"	1:05
7.	"Exit Stage Left"	1:44
8.	"It's Really Happening"	0:52
Total length:		7:37

== Marketing ==
In early December 2020, six posters for the series were released daily, each depicting a decade from the 1950s through the 2000s. Charles Pulliam-Moore from io9 noted that at first glance, the 1960s poster appears to only subtly change the television image from the 1950s poster, but pointed out other objects in the living room "like the wallpaper, the plant, the art on the wall, and the television itself, are also changing". He called the magician's top hat resting on the television set most likely a reference to "Wanda's vast magical abilities that the series is meant to further develop" and felt the central hanging lamp was meant to "reflect the positioning of Vision's Infinity Stone, the status of which is one of the bigger questions looming over WandaVision". Collider's Allie Gemmill said seeing Vision in his true form rather than his human appearance was "attention-grabbing", and she felt the inclusion of the top hat was "an odd accessory and one worth keeping an eye on". After the episode's release, Marvel announced merchandise inspired by the episode as part of its weekly "Marvel Must Haves" promotion for each episode of the series, including t-shirts, housewear, accessories, and a replica of the Strücker watch from the episode's fake commercial. The gold tone replica watch, with gold lettering and green Hydra symbol and text, was released by Hot Topic. In February 2021, Marvel partnered with chef Justin Warner to release a recipe for Sokovian iced tea, inspired by the drink Maximoff has during Dottie's planning committee meeting in the episode.

== Release ==
=== Streaming ===
"Don't Touch That Dial" was released on the streaming service Disney+ on January 15, 2021. The episode was originally listed as "Episode 2" on the service, but the title was updated by January 20 to be "Don't Touch That Dial". Hoai-Tran Bui at /Film originally assumed that all of the episodes for the series would be untitled, and wondered if the titles were being withheld upon release to avoid spoilers despite not finding the second episode's title to be particularly revealing. In October 2026, the episode, along with the first and third of the series, was made available for free on YouTube in anticipation of the release of the WandaVision sequel series, VisionQuest (2026).

=== Home media ===
The episode, along with the rest of WandaVision, was released on Ultra HD Blu-ray and Blu-ray on November 28, 2023.

== Reception ==
=== Audience viewership ===
Nielsen Media Research, which measures the number of minutes watched by United States audiences on television sets, listed WandaVision as the sixth most-watched original series across streaming services for the week of January 11–17, with 434 million minutes viewed. This is around 6.48 million complete views of the series' first two episodes, which were both released on January 15, and more complete views than the series on Nielsen's top 10 original series list which had more minutes viewed but longer runtimes available.

Parrot Analytics used social media, fan ratings, and piracy data to evaluate audience demand for the series, and found it to be in the top 0.2 percent of series worldwide. WandaVision ranked in the top 15 shows worldwide for each of its first four days of release, as well as the top 45 shows in the U.S. during that same period. Mexico, France, Brazil, Chile, and Germany were some of its top international markets during those first four days. On January 15, the series was 24.5% more in-demand than Disney+'s The Mandalorian was when it premiered in November 2019, but WandaVision was behind that series' current audience demand. WandaVision had a 9.3% share of the engagement on Reelgood, an online streaming guide with more than 2 million U.S. users, for its premiere weekend of January 15–17, making it the most-streamed series during that time according to their data. A similar service, Whip Media's TV Time, found WandaVision to be the most anticipated series among U.S. users of their platform and listed it as the second-most-viewed series globally during its debut weekend. Tracking on certain opted-in smart TVs, Samba TV found that 1.1 million U.S. households watched both of the first two episodes from January 15 to 18, with 1.2 million watching "Don't Touch That Dial".

=== Critical response ===
The review aggregator website Rotten Tomatoes reported a 100% approval rating with an average score of 8/10 based on 19 reviews. The site's critical consensus reads, "'Don't Touch That Dial!' or you may miss one of WandaVision's myriad Easter eggs—or a clue in its slow building mystery."

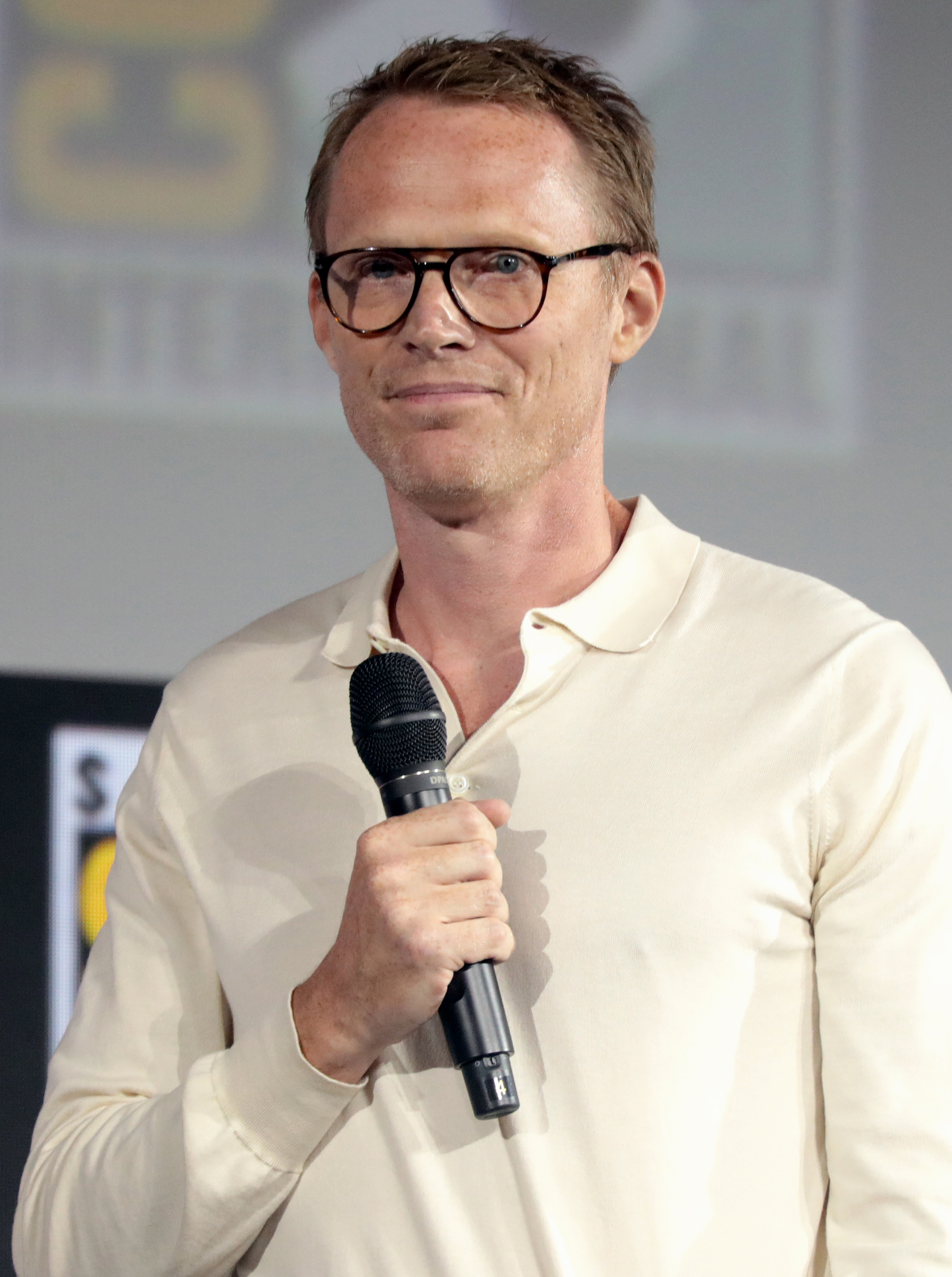
Paul Bettany received praise for his physical comedy in the episode, which was inspired by Dick Van Dyke, Dudley Moore, Rik Mayall, and John Cleese.

The A.V. Club's Sam Barsanti called the first two episodes of the series "an absolute delight, with hoary old sitcom gags that somehow kill" and "a nicely weird, novel way to have fun with these characters", while his colleague Stephen Robinson gave the episodes an "A−", particularly highlighting Olsen and Bettany's physical comedy during Maximoff and Vision's magic show. Rebecca Iannucci of TVLine felt the episode's cold opening was delightful. Christian Holub at Entertainment Weekly was pleased with the Hanna-Barbera-style animation in the episode as well as the fake commercial, which he felt made the series more interesting than previous Marvel TV series. He also speculated that Advanced Idea Mechanics (A.I.M.) could be behind the sitcom illusion, given the beekeeper who appears in the episode looks like A.I.M. members in the comics and the commercial for Strücker watches alludes to A.I.M.'s comic book founder Baron Strucker. Reviewing the first two episodes for Den of Geek, Don Kaye gave them 4 out of 5 stars, saying that while the plot was incidental, the breaks from reality added "gravitas to the surreal and otherwise amusing proceedings". He also praised the comedic performances of Olsen, Bettany, and Hahn.

IGN's Matt Purslow rated the first two episodes 7 out of 10 and called the second episode the funnier of the two since it was able to dedicate itself more to Maximoff and Vision's talent show act. However, he felt the episode covered "almost identical ground to the first", with little additional plot development in the second episode. Writing for Vulture, Abraham Riesman gave the episode 3 out of 5 stars and said it was "just a prelude to the real plot, a prelude filled with intentional artifice and homage. There's nothing beneath it other than a mystery, one that's not particularly compelling yet." He was intrigued by the presence of S.W.O.R.D., but viewers unfamiliar with the comics might not feel the same. For those viewers, Riesman believed there was "not a ton to grab onto here" besides the performances from Olsen and Bettany and the homages to past sitcoms.

=== Accolades ===
Bettany was named TVLine's "Performer of the Week" for the week of January 11, 2021, for his performance in this episode. The site highlighted Bettany's "fearless physical comedy and a top-notch 'drunken' performance" since it was a departure from the character seen in the films, adding that the "old-fashioned, nostalgic charm" was a delight to see. For the 73rd Primetime Creative Arts Emmy Awards, Karen Bartek, Cindy Welles, Nikki Wright, Anna Quinn, and Yvonne Kupka were nominated for Outstanding Period and/or Character Hairstyling for the episode, while Dave Jordan and Shannon Murphy were nominated for Outstanding Music Supervision. Titmouse, Inc. was nominated for Best Sponsored Production at the 49th Annie Awards for the animated opening title sequence.
