= Now in Color =

- WandaVision episode
- Promotional poster for WandaVision highlighting elements of the 1970s setting seen in this episode
- Episode no.: Episode 3
- Directed by: Matt Shakman
- Written by: Megan McDonnell
- Cinematography by: Jess Hall
- Editing by: Nona Khodai
- Original release date: January 22, 2021
- Running time: 33 minutes

Cast
- Emma Caulfield Ford as Dottie; David Payton as Herb; David Lengel as Phil Jones; Randy Oglesby as Stan Nielson; Rose Bianco as Mrs. Nielson; Ithamar Enriquez as commercial man; Wesley Kimmel as commercial boy; Sydney Thomas as commercial girl; Victoria Blade as commercial woman

Episode chronology
← Previous "Don't Touch That Dial"	Next → "We Interrupt This Program"

"Now in Color" is the third episode of the American television miniseries WandaVision, based on Marvel Comics featuring the characters Wanda Maximoff / Scarlet Witch and Vision. It follows the couple as they try to conceal their powers while living an idyllic suburban life in the town of Westview, New Jersey. The episode is set in the Marvel Cinematic Universe (MCU), sharing continuity with the films of the franchise. It was written by Megan McDonnell and directed by Matt Shakman.

Elizabeth Olsen and Paul Bettany reprise their respective roles as Wanda Maximoff and Vision from the film series, with Teyonah Parris and Kathryn Hahn also starring. Development began by October 2018, and Shakman joined in August 2019. The episode pays homage to sitcoms of the 1970s, such as The Brady Bunch and Good Times, and prominently features Maximoff giving birth to twins and then referencing her own twin brother Pietro. Filming took place in the Atlanta metropolitan area in Atlanta, Georgia, including at Pinewood Atlanta Studios, and in Los Angeles. 1970s effects, such as matte paintings for backgrounds and in-camera effects for superspeed, were replicated with modern visual effects.

"Now in Color" was released on the streaming service Disney+ on January 22, 2021. Critics praised the episode's references to Pietro and Ultron as well as the new information provided on the series' mysteries, but criticized the small role for Hahn's character Agnes.

== Plot ==
During what appears to be the 1970s, Vision and Wanda Maximoff, who has become visibly pregnant in a remarkably short timeframe, has her condition checked by Dr. Nielson, who gives Maximoff a clean bill of health and prepares to leave with his wife for a vacation to Bermuda. While Vision sees Nielson out, he sees his neighbor Herb cut through the concrete wall separating their driveways.

Maximoff and Vision build a new room for the baby and debate what to name him, with Maximoff favoring the name Tommy while Vision prefers the name Billy. Maximoff's pregnancy accelerates rapidly, and her powers go haywire, causing her to accidentally generate an energy surge that shuts down power across Westview. While Vision rushes to get Dr. Nielsen, Maximoff is visited by Geraldine. Maximoff unsuccessfully tries to hide her pregnancy before going into labor. She gives birth to twin boys with Geraldine's assistance.

Dr. Nielsen implies that his vacation was an attempt to escape from Westview. Vision catches Herb and Agnes gossiping, and they ask Vision about Geraldine. Agnes reveals that Geraldine does not have a home or family in Westview. Herb attempts to tell Vision something about their situation, but Agnes stops him. Maximoff interrogates Geraldine after she reveals that she knows Wanda's twin brother Pietro was killed by Ultron. (Note: As depicted in Avengers: Age of Ultron (2015)) Maximoff notices that Geraldine is wearing a pendant with a sword emblem on it.

Vision returns to the house to find that Geraldine has disappeared, and Maximoff explains that she "had to rush home". Outside Westview, Geraldine is cast out from a wall of television static that borders the town and is surrounded by S.W.O.R.D. agents.

A commercial during the WandaVision program advertises Hydra Soak bath powder.

== Production ==
=== Development ===
By October 2018, Marvel Studios was developing a limited series starring Elizabeth Olsen's Wanda Maximoff and Paul Bettany's Vision from the Marvel Cinematic Universe (MCU) films. In August 2019, Matt Shakman was hired to direct the miniseries. He and head writer Jac Schaeffer executive produced alongside Marvel Studios' Kevin Feige, Louis D'Esposito, and Victoria Alonso. Feige described the series as part "classic sitcom", part "Marvel epic", paying tribute to many eras of American sitcoms. The third episode, "Now in Color", was written by Megan McDonnell and pays homage to 1970s sitcoms.

=== Writing ===
The episode pays homage to 1970s sitcoms such as The Brady Bunch, Good Times, The Mary Tyler Moore Show, and The Partridge Family. Co-star Teyonah Parris said these mixed references created a "clash of lots of elements and characters", and she used the characters Thelma and Willona from Good Times as a point of reference. McDonnell researched the science behind pregnancy for the episode, while Olsen and Schaeffer discussed what it would be like for a woman to go through pregnancy in such a short period of time. They tried not to "put a blanket over this fuzzy beautiful aspirational birth experience, where she all [of a] sudden loses the belly immediately". Olsen believed Maximoff going through childbirth allowed her to connect with buried memories of her brother Pietro. Schaeffer added that being a twin and the loss of Pietro were parts of Maximoff's experience and trauma, and referencing them in this episode "made sense... in that moment for her to have some emotional honesty" surrounded by the sitcom world's false sense of happiness. For the scene where Vision tells Maximoff that something is wrong with their situation and a jump cut is used to go back before he started speaking, the editing technique was written into the script as a way to destabilize the audience while giving them an insight into Maximoff's state of mind. Schaeffer felt that some audience members might think there is an issue with the Disney+ service in that moment, which made it a more daring and exciting approach for the creatives.

External videos
- Hydra Soak | Marvel Studios' WandaVision | Disney+ presents the full Hydra Soak commercial from the episode, YouTube video from Marvel Entertainment's channel

The series features fake commercials that Feige said would indicate "part of the truths of the show beginning to leak out", with "Now in Color" including a commercial that is advertising Hydra Soak bath powder with the slogan "Find the Goddess Within!". With the further mention of Hydra after its use in the second episode's commercial, Savannah Salazar of Vulture believed Hydra could be the organization behind what was happening in the series, though some of the dialogue in the commercial indicated to Salazar that Maximoff was creating her own world to escape her problems. Molly Edwards at Total Film felt the commercial's phrasing could imply that Maximoff's powers were "within" already and unlocked by Hydra, rather than her gaining them through experimentation. A similar Hydra mind control soap is mentioned in the Marvel Television series Agents of S.H.I.E.L.D., in the fourth season episode "Identity and Change".

=== Casting ===
The episode stars Elizabeth Olsen as Wanda Maximoff, Paul Bettany as Vision, Teyonah Parris as Geraldine, and Kathryn Hahn as Agnes. Also appearing as residents of Westview are Emma Caulfield Ford as Dottie Jones, David Payton as Herb, David Lengel as Phil Jones, Randy Oglesby as Dr. Stan Nielson, and Rose Bianco as Mrs. Nielson. Ithamar Enriquez, Wesley Kimmel, Sydney Thomas, and Victoria Blade portray the actors in the Hydra Soak commercial.

=== Design ===
Shakman and cinematographer Jess Hall put together a collection of images from existing series that influenced the framing, composition, and color of the episode's sitcom setting, and Hall created a specific color palette of 20 to 30 colors for the episode based on those reference images so he could control the "visual integrity in color" of the episode. Hall worked with production designer Mark Worthington and costume designer Mayes C. Rubeo to ensure that the sets and costumes for the episode matched with his color palette. The episode shifts to Technicolor after the first two episodes were in black-and-white, and is inspired by the early color film look of 1970s television. Hall found this difficult to replicate digitally, with the Lookup Table that he created for the episode (for translating colors into the final look during the digital intermediate process) separating the different colors more than other episodes and moving them towards a pastel color range.

The main dress that Maximoff wears while she is pregnant was made from vintage fabric that Rubeo's team discovered in Los Angeles, with only 30 meters (98 ft) of the fabric available for them to use. The dress parts in the front to give extra room for the character's stomach as her pregnancy progresses throughout the episode. For the opening title sequence, Rubeo used a variety of different 1970s styles such as bell bottom pants, long vests, and ruffles, with especial influence from the costumes of The Partridge Family. Rubeo took inspiration for Vision's costumes from Robert Redford's in Three Days of the Condor (1975), at Bettany's request. The pants that Geraldine wears in the episode, described as "fish-print cobalt flares", inspired the makeup team to design an equally bold look for the character; makeup head Tricia Sawyer explained that the pants were not made when they began work on the episode, but Rubeo showed them the fabric that would be used and Sawyer matched them with a vibrant blue for Parris's makeup. Hair stylist Karen Bartek used wigs for the hair styles in the episode to allow it to be filmed at the same time as other episodes without the actors' hair having to be re-styled to change between eras.

Title card for the WandaVision program's opening sequence, which says "in color" to reference the change from black-and-white to color in this series and The Brady Bunch

Perception, who created the end credits sequence for the series, also created the opening title sequence for this episode. The graphics for the opening titles feature a repeating motif of "multi-color geometric shapes and typography" in an homage to The Brady Bunch, though elements of The Mary Tyler Moore Show were added after a sequence solely inspired by The Brady Bunch did not work as the producers wanted. Unlike sitcoms of the 1970s that would use stock footage in their opening sequences, Shakman filmed moments specifically for this opening. The sequence ends with the title card "WandaVision In Color", with the "in color" being a reference to the series' change from black-and-white to color for this episode, as well as a similar transformation during the run of The Brady Bunch. Additionally, Perception provided graphics for the episode's fake commercial based on similar commercials from the 1970s.

=== Filming and editing ===
Soundstage filming occurred at Pinewood Atlanta Studios in Atlanta, Georgia, with Shakman directing, and Hall serving as cinematographer. Filming also took place in the Atlanta metropolitan area, with backlot and outdoor filming occurring in Los Angeles when the series resumed production after being on hiatus due to the COVID-19 pandemic. "Now in Color" was filmed with a single-camera setup, and tungsten lights that were common for the 1970s era, with the majority of the episode also featuring a laugh track and a 4:3 aspect ratio. The end of the episode reverts to a modern 2:40:1 widescreen ratio when Geraldine is cast out of Westview. The lenses Hall used from Panavision when shooting the sitcom material had an "even falloff around the edges" that worked well in the square 4:3 aspect ratio and was period-appropriate.

Editor Nona Khodai watched episodes of The Brady Bunch, The Mary Tyler Moore Show, and Laverne & Shirley to prepare for the episode. When she first arrived in Atlanta to work on the series, a lot of footage for the episode had already been filmed and she had help from the series' other editors, Tim Roche and Zene Baker, to work through that existing footage. Among other period-appropriate editing techniques, jump cuts were used to depict Maximoff magically changing clothes, with a shot of Olsen freezing in one position cut with a shot of her in the same position in a different costume. Her stand-in copied the position while Olsen got changed in between the shots.

=== Visual effects ===
Tara DeMarco served as the visual effects supervisor for WandaVision, with the episode's visual effects created by Monsters Aliens Robots Zombies (MARZ), Framestore, Rodeo FX, RISE, The Yard VFX, SSVFX, and capital T. Rodeo FX developed the visual effects for the Hex boundary, based on the magnetization of old CRT television screens when brought into contact with magnets. The boundary is depicted as clear and difficult to see, as Shakman wanted it to be mysterious and unsettling for the audience. Some of the special effects for the nursery set were achieved through wire rigs that were augmented with visual effects. A live butterfly was used to land on Bettany's nose, while other butterflies were CGI to give the visual effects artists more control and make their appearance more fantastical. Framestore created the butterflies, and also made the stork that appears in the episode. They put a lot of detail into the Stork model, down to the veins in each feather, which allowed more control over the lighting of the model.

DeMarco used Vision's introduction in Avengers: Age of Ultron (2015) as the definitive version of the character when approaching the visual effects for him in WandaVision. Bettany wore a bald cap and face makeup on set to match Vision's color, as well as tracking markers for the visual effects teams to reference. Complex 3D and digital makeup techniques were then used to create the character, with sections of Bettany's face replaced with CGI on a shot-by-shot basis; the actor's eyes, nose, and mouth were usually the only elements retained. MARZ was responsible for creating Vision in the series' first three episodes. To give Vision a more "wholesome" look, the digital contact lenses used in the films and later episodes were not added to Bettany's eyes in the first three episodes, and his eyelashes were not digitally removed as they usually are. Marvel asked that shots of Vision changing between his human and synthezoid forms mimic "vintage", period-appropriate effects. MARZ visual effects supervisor Ryan Freer researched effects that were used in the 1970s and 1980s, and settled on a design that features "sharp-looking" glowing lines inspired by Tron (1982). MARZ also created a digital matte painting for when Vision leaves the house to replace the actual background that was filmed with, which the producers did not like. Freer said the painting intentionally looked "so cheesy and so flat". For the scenes where Vision uses superspeed to run or put things together in the episode, DeMarco and MARZ researched how this was portrayed in 1970s television series such as The Six Million Dollar Man and Wonder Woman. Those series used shutter speed on the camera to create the effect, leaving the shutter open for longer and flashing extra lights to affect the exposure of the image. For this episode, MARZ took on-set footage of Bettany in slow-motion and used digital effects to simulate the look of those 1970s effects.

=== Music ===
External audio
- We Got Something Cooking (From "WandaVision: Episode 3"/Audio Only) presents the full theme song from the episode by Robert Lopez and Kristen Anderson-Lopez, YouTube audio-only video from MarvelMusicVevo's channel

Songwriters Kristen Anderson-Lopez and Robert Lopez were proud of the lyrics for "We Got Something Cooking", the episode's theme song, including "one plus one is more than two" and "one plus one is family" which Anderson-Lopez felt were "the dumbest and funniest and most TV-like lyric we've ever written". She said the latter quote was originally "one plus one is more than three", but this was rewritten to avoid spoiling the fact that Maximoff is pregnant with twins. Anderson-Lopez was the theme's main writer and chose words related to pregnancy while setting up the idea of "making it up as we go along ... [and also] it's us versus the world." The couple repurposed the theme's tune and chords from a song they had written for the cancelled Walt Disney Animation Studios feature film Gigantic.

The song "Daydream Believer" by the Monkees is also featured in the episode, while Maximoff sings a lullaby near the end of the episode that was written by Schaeffer. Titled "Sokovian Lullaby", the song was translated into the fictional Sokovian language by the series' language coach Courtney Young. Schaeffer said the song was just about a mother singing for her child, with influence from a song she heard at a prenatal fitness class, rather than any of the series' larger mysteries. She described it as a "sincere version of a TV sitcom theme song". A soundtrack album for the episode was released digitally by Marvel Music and Hollywood Records on January 29, 2021, featuring composer Christophe Beck's score. The first track is the episode's theme song by Anderson-Lopez and Lopez.

WandaVision: Episode 3 (Original Soundtrack)
No.	Title	Length
1.	"We Got Something Cooking" (featuring Kristen Anderson-Lopez, Elyse Willis, Laura Dickinson, Robert Lopez, Eric Bradley & Gerald White)	1:07
2.	"Uncharted Waters"	1:06
3.	"The Strangest Thing"	1:17
4.	"Hydra-Soak"	0:39
5.	"A Stork in the House"	0:49
6.	"Fish Pants"	0:52
7.	"A Child Is Born"	1:27
8.	"Twins"	1:44
9.	"No Home"	3:30
Total length:		12:31

== Marketing ==
In early December 2020, six posters for the series were released daily, each depicting a decade from the 1950s through the 2000s. Charles Pulliam-Moore from io9 called the 1970s poster "the biggest aesthetic change" from the previous ones, indicating that the episode would be in "vivid technicolor". He was unsure if the bare walls and the bowl of fruit on the television set had any significance, but felt the fruit could be a reference to the "surprising twist of fate the Visions discover a little down the line". Keegan Prosser at Comic Book Resources noted that the poster had "decade appropriate wood paneling", with Maximoff and Vision in era-appropriate clothes and hairstyles. After the episode's release, Marvel announced merchandise inspired by the episode as part of its weekly "Marvel Must Haves" promotion for each episode of the series, including t-shirts, house wear, accessories, Funko Pops, and a sterling silver replica of Geraldine's necklace with the sword pendant on it from the episode. In February 2021, Marvel partnered with chef Justin Warner to release a recipe for Doctor Nielsen's Baby Fruit Salad, based on Dr. Nielsen comparing growing babies to various fruits in the episode.

== Release ==
"Now in Color" was released on the streaming service Disney+ on January 22, 2021. The episode, along with the rest of WandaVision, was released on Ultra HD Blu-ray and Blu-ray on November 28, 2023. In October 2026, the episode, along with the first and second of the series, was made available for free on YouTube in anticipation of the release of the WandaVision sequel series, VisionQuest (2026).

== Reception ==
=== Audience viewership ===
Nielsen Media Research, which measures the number of minutes watched by United States audiences on television sets, recorded 374 million minutes of WandaVision viewed across the available first three episodes for the week of January 18 to 24, 2021. Scott Mendelson at Forbes discussed this number, noting how difficult it is to determine the views for each episode using this data. He felt it was likely that the majority of "die-hard fans" had watched the first two episodes on their opening weekend and the third episode on January 22, and estimated that the 374 million minutes were somewhere between 3.76 million subscribers watching a combination of all three episodes and 11.39 million subscribers watching just "Now in Color". He also felt that the lower number of views in the week compared to some other series could be attributed to WandaVision's weekly release, and opined that Disney accepted this in exchange for the continued discussions and coverage that the weekly release had given to event series such as Game of Thrones and The Mandalorian.

=== Critical response ===
The review aggregator website Rotten Tomatoes reported an 85% approval rating with an average score of 7.20/10 based on 26 reviews. The site's critical consensus reads, "'Now in Color' takes on a darker tone as it continues to unravel the show's central mystery, raising nearly as many new questions as it answers along the way."

The A.V. Club's Sam Barsanti felt the "proverbial dam breaks" when Pietro is named, adding "that chilling moment... could quietly be one of the best 'Oh damn, they're doing the thing' MCU moments in a long time." His colleague Stephen Robinson gave the episode a "B+" and felt with this episode, "the plot kicks into thrilling overdrive", likening the episode more to The Twilight Zone than The Brady Bunch. Robinson was less enthused about the 1970s era than the 1960s from the previous episode, called the laugh track in the episode "even more intrusive" than in the previous episode, and wished Agnes was featured more in this episode. Robinson did call the final act of the episode "unsettling" with its dark overtones. Don Kaye, reviewing the episode for Den of Geek, felt it "fully embraces the 1970s TV comedy esthetic, complete with crazy hairdos and outfits, brightly lit sets and even a new theme song and credits sequence that all look like they arrived fresh from a Brady Bunch audition". He gave "Now in Color" four out of five stars.

Darren Franich at Entertainment Weekly highlighted Parris, pointing out that one of her monologues "left me in stitches". However, he criticized a supposed scary sequence in the episode as "generic". Franich's colleague Chancellor Agard enjoyed the stork coming to life, as it was "a hilarious visual" that "added an extra level of weirdness to the entire episode". He felt the series' emotional stakes of Maximoff escaping her grief of losing Vision and her brother Pietro had "locked into place" by the end of the episode. Agard gave the episode a "B+", with fellow Entertainment Weekly writer Christian Holub "flipp[ing] out" at Ultron's mention. Writing for IGN and giving "Now in Color" an 8 out of 10, Matt Purslow said, "this 1970s-set entry finally cracks the sitcom illusion just enough to make WandaVision's two elements of TV comedy homage and MCU puzzle box feel cohesive rather than disparate. We may be only inches closer to learning more about the show's mystery, but it's a mile ahead in terms of making WandaVision feel like a genuine MCU installment." With Westview revealed to be a physical place, Purslow questioned if it was perhaps in an alternate reality and linked to Doctor Strange in the Multiverse of Madness (2022).

Ben Travers of IndieWire was more critical of the episode, giving it a "C+". He felt the balance between a sitcom homage series and a mystery was "still way off, but at least the series seems to be inching closer to acknowledging its duality" and that Agnes was underutilized in the episode. He did not enjoy the facade of the sitcom world stating "it's really hard to kick back and enjoy the show... when you know it's just there to fill time between information drops". Giving "Now in Color" 2 out of 5 stars, Abraham Riesman at Vulture felt the episode "sets out to dial up the weirdness and confusion, and it more or less achieves that goal" but added that the only challenge WandaVision was giving viewers was to gather clues about the mystery being established, which was "just about the emptiest, most patronizing way to keep people coming back to something". He continued that "what we've seen so far is concerning" and was prepared to be pleasantly surprised if the remaining episodes became more interesting, but was not "getting [his] hopes up".
