= Filmed Before a Live Studio Audience =

- WandaVision episode
- Promotional poster for WandaVision highlighting elements of the 1950s setting seen in this episode
- Episode no.: Episode 1
- Directed by: Matt Shakman
- Written by: Jac Schaeffer
- Cinematography by: Jess Hall
- Editing by: Tim Roche
- Original release date: January 15, 2021
- Running time: 30 minutes

Cast
- Asif Ali as Norm; David Lengel as Phil Jones; Ithamar Enriquez as commercial man; Victoria Blade as commercial woman; Amos Glick as Dennis the mailman

Episode chronology
← Previous —	Next → "Don't Touch That Dial"

"Filmed Before a Live Studio Audience" is the first episode of the American television miniseries WandaVision, based on Marvel Comics featuring the characters Wanda Maximoff / Scarlet Witch and Vision. It follows the newlywed couple as they try to conceal their powers while living an idyllic suburban life in the town of Westview, New Jersey. The episode is set in the Marvel Cinematic Universe (MCU), sharing continuity with the films of the franchise. It was written by head writer Jac Schaeffer and directed by Matt Shakman.

Elizabeth Olsen and Paul Bettany reprise their respective roles as Wanda Maximoff and Vision from the film series, with Debra Jo Rupp, Fred Melamed, and Kathryn Hahn also starring. Development began by October 2018, and Schaeffer was hired to write the episode and serve as head writer for the series in January 2019. Shakman joined that August. The episode pays homage to sitcoms from the 1950s and 1960s, including The Dick van Dyke Show and I Love Lucy. Filming occurred in front of a live studio audience over two days in early November 2019, at Pinewood Atlanta Studios in Atlanta, Georgia. It was shot in black-and-white and used many period-appropriate practical special effects and wire gags.

"Filmed Before a Live Studio Audience" was released on the streaming service Disney+ on January 15, 2021. Critics praised the faithful recreation of sitcom elements from the era and the performances of Olsen, Bettany, and Hahn. The episode had Disney+'s most-watched series premiere opening weekend until it was surpassed by the series premiere of The Falcon and the Winter Soldier in March 2021. It received several accolades, including three Primetime Emmy Award nominations, winning one for Outstanding Fantasy/Sci-Fi Costumes.

== Plot ==
Newlywed couple Wanda Maximoff and Vision move into the town of Westview, New Jersey, during what appears to be the 1950s. They attempt to blend in, despite Vision being an android and Maximoff having telekinetic abilities. One day they notice a heart drawn on a calendar but cannot remember what it signifies. Vision amazes his co-workers at Computational Services Inc. with his speed, but is unsure what the company actually does. Their neighbor Agnes introduces herself to Wanda, and the pair conclude that the heart represents Maximoff and Vision's anniversary. Agnes helps Maximoff prepare for the occasion. Vision's boss Mr. Hart reminds him that Maximoff and Vision are hosting Mr. Hart and his wife for dinner that night, which is what the heart on the calendar actually represents.

That night, Maximoff and Vision struggle to hide their abilities while making a last-minute dinner for the Harts, with help from Agnes. As they sit down to eat, the Harts ask Maximoff and Vision about themselves, but the couple are unable to explain where they came from. Mr. Hart grows furious and chokes on his food, at which point the episode's sitcom format subsides. Vision uses his powers to remove the food from Mr. Hart's throat at Maximoff's request. The sitcom format returns and the Harts thank Maximoff and Vision for dinner before leaving. As Maximoff and Vision reaffirm their love for one another, these events are revealed to be occurring on the fictional sitcom WandaVision that someone is watching using 21st-century technology. (Note: The character watching WandaVision is revealed to be Darcy Lewis in the series' fourth episode, "We Interrupt This Program".)

A commercial during the WandaVision program advertises a Stark Industries ToastMate 2000 toaster oven.

== Production ==
=== Development ===
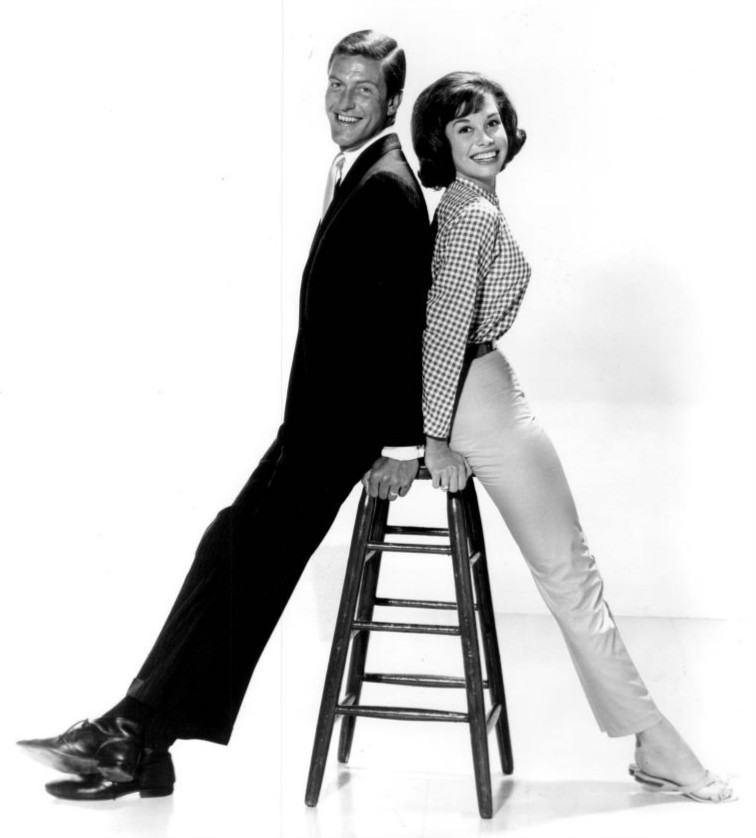
Publicity photo of Dick Van Dyke as Rob and Mary Tyler Moore as Laura from The Dick Van Dyke Show. "Filmed Before a Live Studio Audience" pays homage to that series, with the relationship between Rob and Laura inspiring the portrayal of Wanda Maximoff and Vision in the episode. Van Dyke was consulted by WandaVision's creative team.

By October 2018, Marvel Studios was developing a limited series starring Elizabeth Olsen's Wanda Maximoff and Paul Bettany's Vision from the Marvel Cinematic Universe (MCU) films. In January 2019, Jac Schaeffer was hired as head writer of WandaVision, and was set to write the first episode of the series. In August, Matt Shakman was hired to direct the miniseries, with Schaeffer and Shakman executive producing alongside Marvel Studios' Kevin Feige, Louis D'Esposito, and Victoria Alonso. Feige described the series as part sitcom, part "Marvel epic", paying tribute to many eras of American sitcoms. Olsen described the first episode as a "big love song to The Dick Van Dyke Show", though it also pays homage to other series such as I Love Lucy. As research for replicating the style of those series, Schaeffer, Shakman, and Feige spoke with Dick Van Dyke—the star of the eponymous 1960s sitcom—to learn how that series could be "very broad with silly physical-comedy gags, and yet it never feels false". Van Dyke told them his show was guided by what could and could not happen in real life. The first episode's title was revealed to be "Filmed Before a Live Studio Audience" in January 2021.

=== Writing ===
Of all the sitcom styles that the series pays homage to, Schaeffer found the 1950s era to be one of the most challenging to write because of the "patter-patter" dialogue of the time, which she attempted to replicate in this episode. She noted that this is the "most wholly sitcom" episode of the series, with later episodes introducing more elements from outside the sitcom format. This meant the episode had the least amount of mythology to establish, leading to the smallest number of changes for the series with only eight script revisions.

Two scenes that were conceived early in development are the opening with Maximoff and Vision in the kitchen, and the scene with Vision at his job. The kitchen scene had to establish the tone and premise of the series, and convince the audience to continue watching despite the unexpected 1950s sitcom format. Schaeffer hoped to do this with an entertaining start for the episode, and an early discovery for her in writing the scene was a "cutesy back and forth" between Maximoff and Vision that was inspired by the relationships between couples in 1950s and 1960s sitcoms. Schaeffer felt the whole series depended on the appeal of Maximoff and Vision's relationship, which for this episode she specifically based on the "adorable, relatable and aspirational" relationship between Rob and Laura Petrie (Van Dyke and Mary Tyler Moore, respectively) in The Dick Van Dyke Show. She also described Maximoff as "full Donna Reed" in the episode, with Agnes inspired by "sex-starved but forever rebuffed middle-aged neighbor" women such as Ethel on I Love Lucy, Mrs. Roper on Three's Company, and Mona on Who's the Boss?. The primary conflict of the sitcom scenes is a misunderstanding between Maximoff and Vision about their dinner plans, which Schaeffer settled on after brainstorming ideas with series writers Laura Donney and Mackenzie Dohr, as well as writers assistant Clay Lapari.

The dinner scene with the Harts at the end of the episode was one of the most difficult for Schaeffer to write. She wanted the episode to "lull the audience into the sitcom mode ... and then shatter that" with a key moment during the dinner, but initially did not know what this could be. She did know that it would not involve a supervillain appearing since that would not fit the nature of the series. Schaeffer consulted with the writers' room for their ideas, and they discussed what could happen that the audience would find upsetting. They looked at episodes of past sitcoms that dealt with special topics, such as drug use, since Schaeffer felt those created an uncomfortable feeling for the audience that broke away from the appeal of sitcoms. She decided that Mr. Hart would choke on his food during the dinner scene and almost die, which she felt was a simple solution but something that would stand out as an uncomfortable and confusing moment within the sitcom experience. She hoped that the sight of Mr. Hart choking would have a similar emotional impact on the audience as seeing a fight scene in an MCU film would. Schaeffer wrote into the script that the filming style for this sequence would change from a sitcom-style multi-camera setup and become close-ups inside the set.

External videos
- ToastMate 2000 | Marvel Studios' WandaVision | Disney+ presents the full ToastMate 2000 commercial from the episode, YouTube video from Marvel Entertainment's channel

The series features fake commercials that Feige said would indicate "part of the truths of the show beginning to leak out", with "Filmed Before a Live Studio Audience" including a commercial that is advertising a Stark Industries ToastMate 2000 toaster oven with the slogan "Forget the past, this is your future!". The toaster oven has a blinking red light which is the first time color is introduced to the series, and it has a sound effect reminiscent of Tony Stark's Iron Man repulsors. Including a Stark Industries product points to Tony, who manufactured the weapons used to bomb Sokovia and kill Maximoff's parents as revealed in Avengers: Age of Ultron (2015). Abraham Riesman of Vulture noted that "toaster" is a common insult for robots in science fiction, and highlighted the blinking light for its introduction of color and for blinking long enough to make Riesman uncomfortable. His colleague Savannah Salazar saw the commercial's slogan as a reference to Maximoff letting go of her anger towards Stark when she joined the Avengers, and agreed with Riseman about the toaster being a metaphor for Vision. Brenton Stewart at Comic Book Resources said the light had a "particular air of menace" which gave the commercial an "unsettling feeling of a bomb about to go off". Stewart also pointed out the period-accurate sexist nature of the commercial and how the slogan seemed to be alluding to Maximoff's current situation.

=== Casting ===
The episode stars Elizabeth Olsen as Wanda Maximoff, Paul Bettany as Vision, Debra Jo Rupp as Mrs. Hart, Fred Melamed as Mr. Hart, and Kathryn Hahn as Agnes. Also appearing as residents of Westview are Asif Ali as Norm, David Lengel as Phil Jones, and Amos Glick as Dennis the mailman. Ithamar Enriquez and Victoria Blade portray the man and woman in the ToastMate 2000 toaster oven commercial. Kat Dennings makes an uncredited cameo appearance as Darcy Lewis at the end of the episode, with only her hand being visible; the series reveals that this hand belongs to Lewis in its fourth episode, "We Interrupt This Program".

=== Design ===
Shakman and cinematographer Jess Hall put together a collection of images from existing series that influenced the framing, composition, and color of the episode's sitcom setting, and Hall created a specific color palette of 20 to 30 colors for the episode based on those reference images so he could control the "visual integrity in color" of the episode. Hall worked with production designer Mark Worthington and costume designer Mayes C. Rubeo to ensure that the sets and costumes for the episode matched with his color palette. Hall attempted to create an authentic black-and-white, 1950s look for the episode, but had to balance this with the series' 4K HDR platform. He used digital intermediate (DI) techniques to do this, with a black-and-white Lookup Table (for translating colors into the final look during the DI process) that controlled the HDR factor and the expanded dynamic range. Worthington's team had to learn how different colors work when filmed in black-and-white, and did three days-worth of color tests.

The suit and wedding dress worn by Vision and Maximoff in the opening titles were both made for the series, with the dress created as an homage to Audrey Hepburn's wedding dress in Funny Face (1957). Rubeo felt that dress was the most beautiful wedding dress of the period, and sourced the same fabric that was used on the film from a factory in France. Rubeo had to coordinate with Worthington to make sure the colors of the costumes did not blend with the sets when filmed in black-and-white, as her initial costume for Maximoff did not stand out from the color of the kitchen set and had to be adjusted. Makeup head Tricia Sawyer and hair stylist Karen Bartek aimed to portray Maximoff as the ideal 1950s housewife in the episode, with "perfectly curled locks and flawless makeup." They considered details such as the shapes of her eyebrows and nails, as well as how certain colors translated into black-and-white. To shoot scenes in black-and-white, Bettany was painted blue, rather than Vision's maroon color, since the blue appeared better in the grayscale image. Additionally, Olsen used a pinker shade of foundation, a "robin's egg blue-green" eye shadow, a pinky-red nail color, and a darker pink shade for her lips, to help create a natural look for filming in black-and-white. Camera tests were required to find the correct colors for Olsen, Rupp, and Bettany's makeup. Wigs were used for the hair styles in the episode to allow it to be filmed at the same time as other episodes without the actors' hair having to be re-styled to change between eras.

Typeface used for the WandaVision program's opening sequence, inspired by The Dick van Dyke Show

Perception, who created the end credits sequence for the series, also created a new Marvel Studios logo and opening title sequence for this episode. The logo transitions from the normal Marvel Studios logo into black-and-white and a 4:3 aspect ratio. The logo's fanfare also changes to sound like it is coming from old television speakers. The graphics for the opening titles were inspired by those in The Dick Van Dyke Show, and Perception also made the episode's closing card featuring Maximoff and Vision in an I Love Lucy-style frame. Additionally, Perception provided graphics for the episode's fake commercial based on similar commercials from the 1950s.

=== Filming ===
Filming began in early November 2019, at Pinewood Atlanta Studios in Atlanta, Georgia, with Shakman directing, and Hall serving as cinematographer. "Filmed Before a Live Studio Audience" utilized a multi-camera setup and was shot in black-and-white over two days in front of a live studio audience to mimic classic sitcom filming. A group of Marvel Studios friends and family served as the live studio audience members, including series co-star Teyonah Parris since she does not appear in the episode. Co-executive producer Mary Livanos felt the audience produced a "really great, genuine" reaction to the episode, exceeding the expectations of the producers. Olsen and Bettany were initially hesitant about the live audience, but by the end of filming they "wanted to keep on running the show" that way. Because of the audience, scenes from this episode could not be adjusted later in production. Schaeffer found this aspect exciting, and described the episode as a "very bizarre one-act play".

As with past multi-camera sitcoms, the episode was rehearsed for a week before filming. Many revisions for the episode happened during this week rather than during the writing of the script, including "punching up jokes and enhancing physical comedy bits". The crew dressed in period appropriate outfits during production. Sawyer and Bartek were on set during filming to do touch-ups for the actors between takes, which involved "running in really fast when we had a minute ... just like a [real] sitcom". A 4:3 aspect ratio is used for the black-and-white scenes, shifting to a modern 2.40:1 widescreen ratio for the last shot of the episode which is set outside of the fictional WandaVision program. Hall enjoyed shooting in 4:3 because he was able to use it as a "dramatic tool". He tested using camera lenses from the 1950s, but there were not many of them available for the series and he found them to be fragile. Instead, Hall worked with Panavision to modify modern lenses to match the characteristics from the old lenses that he liked. The resulting lenses created "this sort of even falloff around the edges", which worked well in the square 4:3 aspect ratio and was a period-appropriate effect.

The episode employed a variety of live special effects that were used by series in the 1950s and 1960s, such as props being controlled with wire rigs.

Hall used tungsten lights that were common for the era, with a lighting set-up involving many overhead vintage lights to create an "even, soft lighting" that accommodated for the actors moving into different rooms of the set while filming live. During filming, the special effects team moved props with wire rigs and used camera tricks to create the effect of Maximoff's magic, as was done in series like Bewitched and I Dream of Jeannie. Jump cuts were used to depict Maximoff magically changing clothes, with a shot of Olsen freezing in one position cut with a shot of her in the same position in a different costume. Her stand-in copied the position while Olsen got changed in between the shots. Vision's accelerated actions were achieved by undercranking the camera and adjusting its shutter speed to create in-camera motion blur.

Additional shooting took place without the studio audience for when something goes wrong with Maximoff's illusion in the dinner scene with the Harts. Shakman used lenses, lighting, and sound design to change the mood for this, inspired by The Twilight Zone, and felt the transition from the multi-camera sitcom scenes was "very dramatic". In the dinner scene, Mrs. Hart repeatedly says "stop it", for which Shakman instructed Rupp to act as if she had one emotion on the inside and another on her face. Rupp said balancing the levity and horror of the scene was one of the most interesting things she did on the series, and described the Twilight Zone influences as "genius". The choking scene includes shots looking back where the sitcom audience should be to show that there is a wall there when Maximoff's illusion breaks.

=== Editing ===
Editor Tim Roche said the episode was easier to edit than some of the later ones due to the way it was filmed in front of a live audience, since the actors and Shakman had rehearsed the episode enough that there was a clear roadmap for what the editing should be, based on the onscreen action and the available camera coverage. The one thing that was not as easy for Roche was finding the pacing of the episode, as he found that series from the 1950s had a faster pace than he had initially assumed, but this came from the performance of the actors more so than the editing style. Roche used rewind effects and wipe transitions in the episode.

=== Visual effects ===
Tara DeMarco served as the visual effects supervisor for WandaVision, with the episode's visual effects created by Monsters Aliens Robots Zombies (MARZ), Framestore, RISE, The Yard VFX, and Luma. DeMarco used Vision's introduction in Avengers: Age of Ultron (2015) as the definitive version of the character when approaching the visual effects for him in WandaVision. Bettany wore a bald cap and face makeup on set to match Vision's color, as well as tracking markers for the visual effects teams to reference. Complex 3D and digital makeup techniques were then used to create the character, with sections of Bettany's face replaced with CGI on a shot-by-shot basis; the actor's eyes, nose, and mouth were usually the only elements retained. MARZ was first asked to remake a shot of Vision from Age of Ultron as a test, and was hired to work on WandaVision when Marvel liked the results. The vendor was responsible for creating Vision in the series' first three episodes, including 50–60 shots in the first episode.

MARZ effects supervisor Ryan Freer said the episode provided additional challenges compared to their first test shot since it was the first time that Vision had been seen in black-and-white and doing slapstick comedy. They did additional tests on early footage from the series to ensure that they could preserve Bettany's performance, which involved a lot of "these incredible '50s sitcom expressions with cheek puffs and all". Shakman and Bettany were initially concerned with how the effects would look in this context, but their fears were alleviated after seeing the first shots that MARZ completed for the episode. Freer said animating Vision's face to match Bettany's performance was "tedious", and involved a lot of manual work to make the character's neck match with the collar of Bettany's clothing as well as to clean up the background around Vision's head. For most of the episode's scenes, MARZ completely recreated the on-set lighting to be able to light the character's face correctly. Sometimes they would add back specific highlights from Bettany's face to give Vision's face "more character", and other times they would reduce the amount of reflecting light to make the effect more convincing. The tracking markers on Bettany's face needed to be removed before the final visual effects could be applied to him, and MARZ created an artificial intelligence program that could automatically remove the markers from 50 shots within three hours, which otherwise would have required more manual labor to remove from each frame. To give Vision a more "wholesome" look, the digital contact lenses used in the films and later episodes were not added to Bettany's eyes in the first three episodes, and his eyelashes were not digitally removed as they usually are.

DeMarco said contemporary visual effects were used to remove wires and smooth cuts, and to add wire gags that were not filmed. For example, the kitchen features a blend of practical wire gags and CGI to help "fill out the scene". Freer noted that the CG objects added to the kitchen had to match the practical ones and look "janky and off-time". Shots of Vision changing between his human and synthezoid forms and using his abilities were also designed to mimic period-appropriate effects, with "puffs of smoke and starry glitter" added by MARZ. The scene where Maximoff makes wedding rings appear on her and Vision's fingers was initially created by cutting from a shot of them without rings to a shot of them with the rings on. Marvel felt the result was too seamless for a 1950s sitcom, so MARZ digitally adjusted the actors' hands in the shots to make the jump cut more obvious. DeMarco listed the episode's final shot, which slowly transitions from black-and-white in a 4:3 aspect ratio to a 2:40:1 aspect ratio in full color, as one of the most challenging visual effects of the series.

=== Music ===
External audio
- A Newlywed Couple (From "WandaVision: Episode 1"/Audio Only) presents the full theme song from the episode by Robert Lopez and Kristen Anderson-Lopez, YouTube audio-only video from MarvelMusicVevo's channel

"A Newlywed Couple", the episode's theme song composed by Kristen Anderson-Lopez and Robert Lopez, was meant to evoke the "dawn of television". They included "an optimistic group of voices singing jazzily" about the love between Maximoff and Vision, and were thrilled to use words like "gal" and "hubby" as well as a "big musical pratfall" in the middle of the song. "Gal" is used along with a triplet to pull the "lyric and musical choice together" and make the theme sound like it was written in the late 1950s.

Composer Christophe Beck composed "classic, jazz-style[d]" music for the episode which was recorded with a small orchestra that is typical of the ones used for 1950s television series. He also introduced several themes in the episode that he went on to reprise later in the series, including Maximoff and Vision's love theme when Maximoff creates rings for them, and Beck's "definitive" theme for Maximoff that can be heard during the end credits. Beck's score for the choking scene transitions from the period style to a "tension piece" inspired by the music that Bernard Herrmann composed for Alfred Hitchcock's films. The song "Yakety Yak" by the Coasters is also featured in the episode. A soundtrack album for the episode was released digitally by Marvel Music and Hollywood Records on January 22, 2021, featuring Beck's score. The first track is the theme song by Anderson-Lopez and Lopez.

WandaVision: Episode 1 (Original Soundtrack)
No.	Title	Length
1.	"A Newlywed Couple" (featuring Kristen Anderson-Lopez, Sara Mann, Jessica Rotter, Cindy Bourquin, Elyse Willis, Laura Dickinson, Robert Lopez, Eric Bradley, Greg Whipple, Jasper Randall & Gerald White)	0:54
2.	"Toast-Mate 2000"	0:53
3.	"Dinner Is Served"	0:25
4.	"Calendar Confusion"	1:04
5.	"Frog in My Throat"	1:48
6.	"Thank You for Coming"	0:44
7.	"Parcheesi"	1:03
8.	"Rings"	0:36
9.	"Wanda's Theme (End Credits from WandaVision)"	1:47
Total length:		9:14

== Marketing ==
In early December 2020, six posters for the series were released daily, each depicting a decade from the 1950s through the 2000s. Charles Pulliam-Moore from io9 noted that the 1950s poster was "modest enough at first glance", depicting an "unassuming living room" from the decade, but the "wallpaper peeling to reveal a static-y reality lurking just beneath the surface was conveying that as WandaVision progresses, things are going to get even weirder". Collider's Gregory Lawrence said the poster asks fans to "peel away anything" that feels familiar, and the peeling wallpaper reveals "a glimpse of... something. Something wild, something celestial, something implying a destiny that isn't 'entertaining each other on TV'." He added that the poster "so cleverly, subtly get[s] at the inherent pull of the unusual premise" of the series. After the episode's release, Marvel announced merchandise inspired by the episode as part of its weekly "Marvel Must Haves" promotion for each episode of the series, including shirts, accessories, housewear, Funko Pops, and a set of rings from Entertainment Earth based on those worn by Maximoff and Vision. In February 2021, Marvel partnered with chef Justin Warner to release a recipe for Lobster Thermidor based on the one that Agnes gives to Maximoff in the episode.

== Release ==
=== Streaming ===
"Filmed Before a Live Studio Audience" was released on the streaming service Disney+ on January 15, 2021. The episode was originally listed as "Episode 1" on the service, but the title was updated by January 20 to be "Filmed Before a Live Studio Audience". Hoai-Tran Bui at /Film originally assumed that all of the episodes for the series would be untitled, and wondered if the titles were being withheld upon release to avoid spoilers despite not finding the first episode's title to be particularly revealing. In October 2026, the episode, along with the second and third of the series, was made available for free on YouTube in anticipation of the release of the WandaVision sequel series, VisionQuest (2026).

=== Home media ===
The episode, along with the rest of WandaVision, was released on Ultra HD Blu-ray and Blu-ray on November 28, 2023.

== Reception ==
=== Audience viewership ===
Nielsen Media Research, which measures the number of minutes watched by United States audiences on television sets, listed WandaVision as the sixth-most-watched original series across streaming services for the week of January 11–17, with 434 million minutes viewed. This is around 6.48 million complete views of the series' first two episodes, which were both released on January 15, and more complete views than the series on Nielsen's top 10 original series list which had more minutes viewed but longer runtimes available.

Parrot Analytics used social media, fan ratings, and piracy data to evaluate audience demand for the series, and found it to be in the top 0.2 percent of series worldwide. WandaVision ranked in the top 15 shows worldwide for each of its first four days of release, as well as the top 45 shows in the U.S. during that same period. Mexico, France, Brazil, Chile, and Germany were some of its top international markets during those first four days. On January 15, the series was 24.5 percent more in-demand than Disney+'s The Mandalorian was when it premiered in November 2019, but WandaVision was behind that series' current audience demand. WandaVision had a 9.3 percent share of the engagement on Reelgood, an online streaming guide with more than 2 million U.S. users, for its premiere weekend of January 15–17, making it the most-streamed series during that time according to their data. A similar service, Whip Media's TV Time, found WandaVision to be the most anticipated series among U.S. users of their platform and listed it as the second-most-viewed series globally during its debut weekend. Tracking on certain opted-in smart TVs, Samba TV found that 1.1 million U.S. households watched both of the first two episodes from January 15 to 18, with 1.5 million watching "Filmed Before a Live Studio Audience".

WandaVision had Disney+'s most-watched series premiere opening weekend, ahead of the season premiere of The Mandalorian's second season, until Disney+ announced that it had been surpassed by the series premiere of Marvel Studios' The Falcon and the Winter Soldier in March 2021.

=== Critical response ===
The review aggregator website Rotten Tomatoes reported a 100% approval rating with an average score of 7.40/10 based on 18 reviews. The site's critical consensus reads, "'Filmed Before a Live Studio Audience' taps into the strange side of the MCU and gives Elizabeth Olsen and Paul Bettany plenty of room to flex their comedic muscles."

Roxana Hadadi at RogerEbert.com said Olsen and Bettany had excellent chemistry in the episode, and felt their work elevated the "fairly recognizable plot about a dinner party gone wrong". The A.V. Club's Sam Barsanti called the first two episodes of the series "an absolute delight, with hoary old sitcom gags that somehow kill" and a "nicely weird, novel way to have fun with these characters", while his colleague Stephen Robinson gave the episodes an "A−", feeling Schaeffer delivered a "damn good sitcom". In his recap for the first and second episodes, Christian Holub of Entertainment Weekly praised Hahn's performance, with his colleague Chancellor Agard also praising Olsen and Bettany, saying he forgot at times that the series' sitcom world was fake due to how "locked in" their performances are. Reviewing the first two episodes for Den of Geek, Don Kaye gave them 4 out of 5 stars and said everything in the first episode is a "loving tribute to the kinds of 'wholesome,' squarely middle class, conservative family comedies" that existed in the mid-1950s.

IGN's Matt Purslow rated the first two episodes 7 out of 10, and felt it was "quite a feat of writing" that there were many elements in the first episode that worked on both the "in-show universe and meta levels" despite needing to do a lot of heavy lifting for the series. Purslow also enjoyed the theme song for the episode, the self-aware title sequence, and the fact that S.W.O.R.D. appeared to be making its proper introduction into the MCU. Writing for Vulture, Abraham Riesman gave the episode 3 out of 5 stars, saying it was "nice to see an MCU thing where people are allowed to act. But ultimately, what remains to be seen is whether there's any thematic oomph, or if it's just going to be an empty jumble of well-executed tropes and portents." He did wish more of the show's premise had been kept a secret from the marketing campaign since "the abrupt depositing of the audience into a genre and format completely antithetical to those they had known before would have been a much-needed shock to the system for a viewer used to the MCU's tropes".

=== Accolades ===
Award	Date of ceremony	Category	Recipient(s)	Result	Ref(s)
Primetime Creative Arts Emmy Awards	September 11 – September 12, 2021	Outstanding Fantasy/Sci-Fi Costumes	Mayes C. Rubeo, Joseph Feltus, Daniel Selon, and Virginia Burton	Won	
Primetime Creative Arts Emmy Awards	September 11 – September 12, 2021	Outstanding Period and/or Character Makeup (Non-Prosthetic)	Tricia Sawyer, Vasilios Tanis, Jonah Levy, and Regina Little	Nominated	
Primetime Emmy Awards	September 19, 2021	Outstanding Writing for a Limited or Anthology Series or Movie	Jac Schaeffer	Nominated	
USC Scripter Award	February 26, 2022	Best Adapted TV Screenplay	Jac Schaeffer	Nominated	
Costume Designers Guild Awards	March 9, 2022	Excellence in Period Television	Mayes C. Rubeo	Nominated	
