= On a Very Special Episode... =

- WandaVision episode
- Promotional poster for WandaVision highlighting elements of the 1980s setting seen in this episode
- Episode no.: Episode 5
- Directed by: Matt Shakman
- Written by: Peter Cameron; Mackenzie Dohr
- Cinematography by: Jess Hall
- Editing by: Nona Khodai
- Original release date: February 5, 2021
- Running time: 41 minutes

Cast
- Julian Hilliard as Billy (10 years old); Jett Klyne as Tommy (10 years old); Baylen Bielitz as Billy (5 years old); Gavin Borders as Tommy (5 years old); Josh Stamberg as Tyler Hayward; Amos Glick as Dennis the mailman; Asif Ali as Norm; Alan Heckner as Agent Monti; Selena Anduze as Agent Rodriguez; Victoria Blade as commercial woman; Ithamar Enriquez as commercial man; Sydney Thomas as commercial girl; Wesley Kimmel as commercial boy

Episode chronology
| ← Previous "We Interrupt This Program" | Next → "All-New Halloween Spooktacular!" |

"On a Very Special Episode..." is the fifth episode of the American television miniseries WandaVision, based on Marvel Comics featuring the characters Wanda Maximoff / Scarlet Witch and Vision. It follows the couple as they try to conceal their powers while living an idyllic suburban life in the town of Westview, New Jersey. The episode is set in the Marvel Cinematic Universe (MCU), sharing continuity with the films of the franchise. It was written by Peter Cameron and Mackenzie Dohr, and directed by Matt Shakman.

Elizabeth Olsen and Paul Bettany reprise their respective roles as Wanda Maximoff and Vision from the film series, with Teyonah Parris, Evan Peters, Randall Park, Kat Dennings, and Kathryn Hahn also starring. Development began by October 2018, and Shakman joined in August 2019. The episode pays homage to sitcoms of the 1980s and 1990s, such as Family Ties, Growing Pains, Roseanne, and Full House. It introduces Peters as Maximoff's brother "Pietro", who was previously portrayed in the MCU by Aaron Taylor-Johnson. Peters played a different version of the character in the X-Men film series, and he was cast for WandaVision because of the meta and thematic implications. Maximoff and Vision's children Billy and Tommy also have roles in the episode. Filming took place in the Atlanta metropolitan area in Atlanta, Georgia, including at Pinewood Atlanta Studios, and in Los Angeles.

"On a Very Special Episode..." was released on the streaming service Disney+ on February 5, 2021. Critics praised the episode for its opening titles and theme song, and for its progression of the series' storylines, while Peters' appearance as "Pietro Maximoff" was widely discussed. It received a Primetime Emmy Award nomination.

== Plot ==
In the fictional WandaVision program, now set during the 1980s/early 1990s, Wanda Maximoff and Vision struggle to stop their newborn sons Billy and Tommy from crying. Their neighbor Agnes arrives to help look after the boys, but appears to break character and asks Wanda if they should redo the scene. Vision questions Wanda about Agnes's behavior, but they are interrupted when Billy and Tommy suddenly age-up to five years old. Agnes does not express surprise or concern about this.

Watching the WandaVision series from outside the town of Westview, S.W.O.R.D. director Tyler Hayward calls Maximoff a terrorist, while Monica Rambeau does not believe Maximoff has malicious intentions. Hayward claims that Maximoff recently stole Vision's body from S.W.O.R.D. headquarters and resurrected him, disregarding Vision's living will. Rambeau discovers that her clothing was transformed to match the design of WandaVision and wonders if they can bypass this by using something era-appropriate.

The boys ask to keep a dog that appears at the house, and Agnes suggests the name Sparky. Maximoff almost reveals her abilities to Agnes, concerning Vision. When Maximoff and Vision decide the boys are too young to care for Sparky, they age up to 10 years old. At work, Vision reads an email from S.W.O.R.D. that reveals the situation in Westview. He breaks the trance over his co-worker Norm, a real Westview resident named Abilash Tandon, who begs Vision to stop "her". Vision then reverts Abilash to Norm.

S.W.O.R.D. sends a drone from the 1980s into Westview and attempts to kill Maximoff on Hayward's orders. She emerges from the static field surrounding the town with the drone and warns Hayward to leave her alone. After Sparky unexpectedly dies, the twins ask their mother to bring him back to life, but she says they cannot do that and urges them to deal with their grief.

Vision confronts Maximoff about controlling the town, revealing that he cannot remember his life or identity before coming to Westview. Maximoff says that not everything is under her control, and she does not know how it started. They are interrupted again when her dead brother "Pietro" arrives at the front door. Watching the broadcast, Darcy Lewis notes that Pietro has been "recast".

A commercial during the WandaVision program advertises Lagos paper towels.

== Production ==
=== Development ===
By October 2018, Marvel Studios was developing a limited series starring Elizabeth Olsen's Wanda Maximoff and Paul Bettany's Vision from the Marvel Cinematic Universe (MCU) films. In August 2019, Matt Shakman was hired to direct the miniseries. He and head writer Jac Schaeffer executive produce alongside Marvel Studios' Kevin Feige, Louis D'Esposito, and Victoria Alonso. Feige described the series as part sitcom, part "Marvel epic", paying tribute to many eras of American sitcoms. The fifth episode, "On a Very Special Episode...", was written by Peter Cameron and Mackenzie Dohr, with the scenes set in the sitcom reality paying homage to the 1980s and early 1990s.

=== Writing ===
Schaeffer felt the entire decade of 1980s sitcoms was an inspiration for the episode, highlighting Family Ties, Full House, Growing Pains, Who's the Boss?, Roseanne, and Just the Ten of Us in particular. Bettany noted that some 1980s sitcoms had "teachable moments", which were sometimes marketed as "a very special episode" when they covered difficult issues. One of the topics that the characters in "On a Very Special Episode..." discuss is not being able to skip the difficult parts of life.

The writers felt that this episode was an important turning point in the series' storyline since it returns to the sitcom reality after the previous episode revealed what is happening in the real world of the MCU, and because it combines the two storylines. It also directly addresses Maximoff and Vision's understanding of what is happening in the series, with Maximoff starting to acknowledge that she has control over the reality while Vision begins to work that out himself. Dohr noted that 1980s sitcoms such as Family Ties and Growing Pains often featured the central family together in a lot of scenes, and that is what Maximoff wants to happen to her family in this episode, but the more she tries to control them, the more she loses control such as when the twins age-up. Early drafts had elements of the house such as the plumbing starting to go "haywire" as another sign that Maximoff was losing control, but this idea was eventually moved to "Breaking the Fourth Wall". Other ideas from early drafts that did not make the final episode include Maximoff trying to distract Vision by having neighbors appear at the house, such as Phil arriving with a band or Dottie coming to hold an exercise class. Agnes appears in a Jazzercise outfit as a reference to the latter. Dohr tried to balance the sitcom scenes with the logistics of Rambeau's storyline, during which the sitcom reality is given the nickname "The Hex" which Dohr came up with. Both storylines connect when Maximoff emerges from the Hex, which the writers decided would happen early on in the series' development and referred to as the "Hex flex".

Schaeffer was interested in starting to show differences of opinion seep into Maximoff and Vision's marriage, leading to a more "authentic" domestic picture of them compared to the depiction of their relationship in earlier episodes. Bettany added that the series would take advantage of the fact that couples seen in sitcoms beginning in the 1980s "aren't necessarily that fond of each other" compared to those in sitcoms from the 1950s to 1970s. Cameron wrote the scene where Maximoff and Vision argue at the end of the episode, and his initial version did not have any superhero elements in it, so he could focus on the grounded drama. He described the scene as an argument between a wife who does not want to talk about a "really touchy subject" with her husband, who is "hell-bent" on discussing it. He added other issues that the couple had also not been discussing into the conversation, since that often happens in most "meaningful" arguments in relationships. Cameron then went back and added superhero elements at the main pivot points of the argument, such as Maximoff rolling the end credits of the sitcom instead of slamming a door on Vision, and Vision levitating instead of slamming his fist on a table. Bettany later added a line where he says "I'm scared", which Cameron felt was a beautiful addition to the scene since it shows Vision's vulnerability within the argument.

The series features fake commercials that Feige said would show "part of the truths of the show beginning to leak out", with "On a Very Special Episode..." including a commercial that advertises Lagos paper towels with the slogan "for when you make a mess you didn't mean to". Charlie Ridgely at ComicBook.com found this to be the most devastating commercial of the series so far, using Maximoff's guilt about her actions in Lagos during Captain America: Civil War (2016) to put the previous commercials into perspective.

=== Casting ===
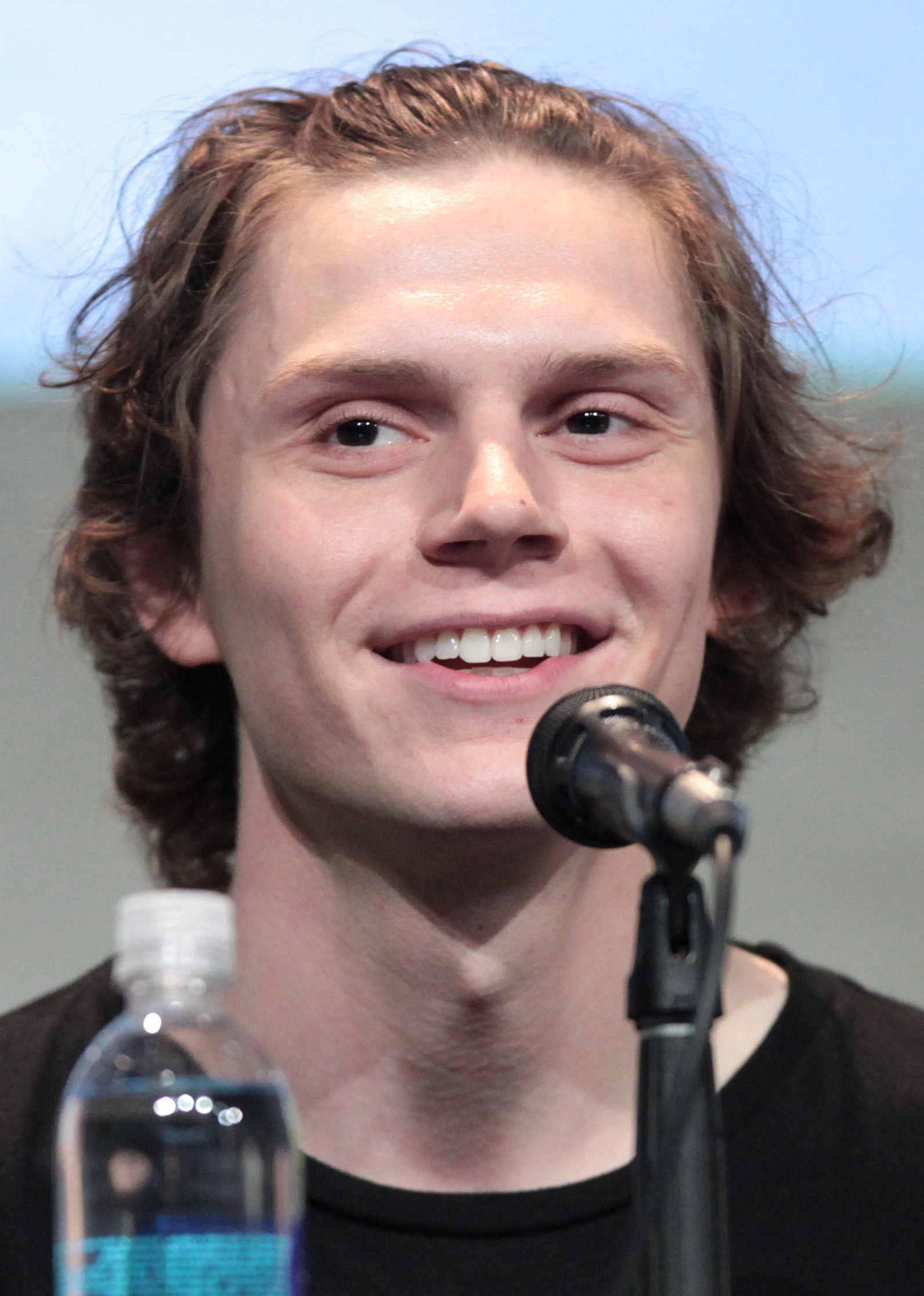
Evan Peters is introduced as "Pietro Maximoff" after previously playing a different version of the character in the X-Men film series.

The episode stars Elizabeth Olsen as Wanda Maximoff, Paul Bettany as Vision, Teyonah Parris as Monica Rambeau, Evan Peters as "Pietro Maximoff", Randall Park as Jimmy Woo, Kat Dennings as Darcy Lewis, and Kathryn Hahn as Agnes.

Pietro was previously portrayed in the MCU by Aaron Taylor-Johnson, while Peters played a different version of the character named Peter Maximoff in the X-Men film series. Lewis notes onscreen that Maximoff has "recast" Pietro, but this was not meant to be interpreted as a real-life recasting of Taylor-Johnson. Schaeffer and co-executive producer Mary Livanos decided early in the development of WandaVision that they wanted to have Pietro return in the series, and decided to have the character be "recast" within the fictional WandaVision program. Feige wanted to ensure there was a sensible reason for the character appearing like this, and Schaeffer noted that it plays to the sitcom tropes of recasting characters without "much fuss" and also of having a relative arrive in town who "stirs things up with the family". She also called it the "biggest thrill" to have Peters join the MCU, and something that would be "so much fun for the audience and the fanbase". Peters was equally up for the appearance, feeling it was a "very interesting, sort of shocking and almost weirdly meta" way of returning to the role. In addition to working on that meta level for the series, Peters portraying Pietro instead of Taylor-Johnson worked thematically for discussing Maximoff's grief since she accepts that this is her brother even though he does not look as she remembered, which shows how her grief is "cloud[ing] her judgement".

Maximoff and Vision's sons have roles in the episode, with Julian Hilliard and Baylen Bielitz as Billy at ages 10 and 5, respectively, and Jett Klyne and Gavin Borders as Tommy at ages 10 and 5, respectively. Also appearing in the episode are Josh Stamberg as S.W.O.R.D. Director Tyler Hayward, Amos Glick as the mailman Dennis, Asif Ali as Norm, Alan Heckner as S.W.O.R.D. Agent Monti, and Selena Anduze as S.W.O.R.D. Agent Rodriguez. Victoria Blade, Ithamar Enriquez, Sydney Thomas, and Wesley Kimmel portray the actors in the Lagos commercial.

=== Design ===
Shakman and cinematographer Jess Hall put together a collection of images from existing series that influenced the framing, composition, and color of the episode's sitcom setting, and Hall created a specific color palette of 20 to 30 colors for the episode based on those reference images, so he could control the "visual integrity in color" of the episode. Hall worked with production designer Mark Worthington and costume designer Mayes C. Rubeo to ensure that the sets and costumes for the episode matched with his color palette. The way film was transferred to video in the 1980s caused a red channel bloom in the picture, so this effect was added to the episode during the digital intermediate process. Hahn suggested her own makeup, inspired by aerobics videos from the 1980s, and worked with makeup department co-head Vasilios Tanis to develop the look which includes "vibrant pink lipstick and heavy purple eyeliner". Hair stylist Karen Bartek used wigs for the hairstyles in the episode to allow it to be filmed at the same time as other episodes without the actors' hair having to be re-styled to change between eras. Olsen's "unrestrained '80s curls" in the episode were the actress's favorite wig for the series.

Typeface used in the WandaVision program's opening sequence, inspired by Family Ties and Growing Pains

Perception, who created the end credits sequence for the series, also created the opening title sequence for this episode based on the openings titles of Family Ties and Growing Pains, as well as Full House. Editor Nona Khodai found the episode's theme song to be quite long compared to the amount of footage that was available to use in the opening sequence, and was not able to cut it shorter. She struggled to not make it too slow and went through many iterations before she was happy. Shakman explained that to be faithful to the Family Ties sequence, photographs of the actors were given to Perception to create the opening line drawing and a painting of the family for the end. Actual photos of Olsen as a child were used in the sequence, but Bettany did not have any baby photos that they could use for young Vision. Pictures of Scott McPhate, one of the series' visual effects coordinators, were used instead because he had "kind of a Paul-Bettany-ish look". Perception edited the photos to give them a "weathered, old family photo album feeling". The crane shots at the end of the sequence were added as an homage to Full House since Olsen's sisters, Mary-Kate and Ashley Olsen, starred in that series. Additionally, Perception provided graphics for the episode's fake commercial based on similar commercials from the 1980s.

=== Filming ===
Soundstage filming occurred at Pinewood Atlanta Studios in Atlanta, Georgia, with Shakman directing, and Hall serving as cinematographer. Filming also took place in the Atlanta metropolitan area, with backlot and outdoor filming occurring in Los Angeles when the series resumed production after being on hiatus due to the COVID-19 pandemic. "On a Very Special Episode..." was filmed using a multi-camera setup, and custom, period-appropriate lenses.

=== Visual effects ===
Tara DeMarco served as the visual effects supervisor for WandaVision, with the episode's visual effects created by Lola VFX, The Yard VFX, Rodeo FX, SSVFX, Cantina Creative, Zoic Studios, RISE, and capital T. Rodeo FX developed the visual effects for the Hex boundary, based on the magnetization of old CRT television screens when brought into contact with magnets. The boundary is initially clear and difficult to see, as Shakman wanted it to be mysterious and unsettling for the audience, but once Maximoff emerges from the boundary to confront S.W.O.R.D. the boundary turns red to reflect her anger and to reinforce that it is a hard barrier.

DeMarco used Vision's introduction in Avengers: Age of Ultron (2015), which was primarily created by Lola VFX, as the definitive version of the character when approaching the visual effects for him in WandaVision. Bettany wore a bald cap and face makeup on set to match Vision's color, as well as tracking markers for the visual effects teams to reference. Complex 3D and digital makeup techniques were then used to create the character, with sections of Bettany's face replaced with CGI on a shot-by-shot basis; the actor's eyes, nose, and mouth were usually the only elements retained. Lola was the primary vendor for Vision in the episode, with effects supervisor Trent Claus noting that particular attention was paid to the "laugh lines or creases beneath [Bettany's] eyes or crow's feet" since completely removing this would remove the actor's performance. Instead, these had to be merged with the synthezoid look, so they appeared like they were "naturally folding in that spot". Claus added that the visual effects work for Vision's face is aided by the subtle performance that Bettany gives to the character. SSVFX did the visual effects for young Vision in the opening sequence, applying the same approach to the photographs that were selected for the sequence as they would to the normal Vision effects shots. Lola was also tasked with replacing Pietro's hair in the episode after Marvel decided that the hair should be more like the version seen in the films than the white wig that Peters wore on set. Lola is known for its beauty, cosmetic, and de-aging visual effects, but Claus said working with digital hair is "always so difficult". The effect was created by manipulating the image in 2D. The change only needed to be made for the few shots that the character appears in for this episode, as well as one from the seventh episode that was filmed at the same time, since Peters' wig was adjusted for the filming of other episodes.

Zoic Studios created the shot where Billy and Tommy age up from five-year-olds to ten years olds. The shot was inspired by similar "morphs" from the 1990s, such as those seen in the music videos for Michael Jackson's "Black or White" and the Backstreet Boys' "As Long as You Love Me". The effect was created using a shot of the younger actors on a green screen, a shot of the older actors on set, and a clean background plate without either. Since people tend to look at the eyes when looking at a face, the team started by lining up the eyes of the actors and morphing around them. They then adjusted the positions of the younger actors to be correct for their height. Due to the differences between the actors' hair and faces across the two ages, Zoic had to create different ranges of hair growth and paint over certain areas to smooth out the transition.

=== Music ===
External audio
- Making It Up As We Go Along (From "WandaVision: Episode 5"/Audio Only) presents the full theme song from the episode by Robert Lopez and Kristen Anderson-Lopez, YouTube audio-only video from MarvelMusicVevo's channel

Theme song composers Kristen Anderson-Lopez and Robert Lopez said the theme for the episode, titled "Making it Up as We Go Along", was their favorite song that they wrote for the series since they grew up in the 1980s. Lopez felt the "craft of theme songwriting peaked in the '80s", with the themes being "longer... touchy-feely ballads". This was the style they chose to emulate with "Making it Up as We Go Along", and since the theme songs of the era were longer, it allowed the couple to "land the emotion of it". Lopez added that it was easy for them to find those emotions because he and Anderson-Lopez have children the same age as Maximoff and Vision's in the episode, and they were also "trying to make things work even as the world kind of crumbles around us".

The song features musical nods to the theme songs of Growing Pains ("As Long as We Got Each Other" by B. J. Thomas and Jennifer Warnes) and Family Ties ("Without Us" by Johnny Mathis and Deniece Williams). Lopez and Anderson-Lopez said they were channeling 1980s rock and pop singers for the song, such as Michael McDonald, Kris Kristofferson, Huey Lewis, and Taylor Dayne. The song originally did not include "WandaVision" as a lyric as with the series' other theme songs, but it was added at the end of the song after encouragement from Marvel to include it. A soundtrack album for the episode was released digitally by Marvel Music and Hollywood Records on February 12, 2021, featuring composer Christophe Beck's score. The first track is the episode's theme song, written and performed by Anderson-Lopez and Lopez.

WandaVision: Episode 5 (Original Soundtrack)
| No. | Title | Length |
|---|---|---|
| 1. | "Making It Up As We Go Along" | 1:42 |
| 2. | "Ten Years Old" | 0:36 |
| 3. | "Lagos" | 0:30 |
| 4. | "Evaluation" | 3:08 |
| 5. | "Family Is Forever" | 0:53 |
| 6. | "Missile Strike" | 4:02 |
| 7. | "Cue Credits" | 0:29 |
| 8. | "Ode to Sparky" | 1:48 |
| 9. | "Pietro" | 3:11 |
| Total length: | | 16:19 |

== Marketing ==
In early December 2020, six posters for the series were released daily, each depicting a decade from the 1950s through the 2000s. Charles Pulliam-Moore from io9 felt that unlike the previous decade posters, the one for the 1980s did not feature many items to garner clues from though it had an "unnatural reflection in the background that may or may not point to the 'falseness' of the reality being depicted". After the episode's release, Marvel announced merchandise inspired by the episode as part of its weekly "Marvel Must Haves" promotion for each episode of the series, including t-shirts and a S.W.O.R.D.-branded stainless steel bottle and can-shaped glass. In March 2021, Marvel partnered with chef Justin Warner to release a recipe for Billy and Tommy's Throwback After-School Snack, cookies and frosting that are a "retro snack" for the "retro feel" of the episode.

== Release ==
"On a Very Special Episode..." was released on the streaming service Disney+ on February 5, 2021. The episode, along with the rest of WandaVision, was released on Ultra HD Blu-ray and Blu-ray on November 28, 2023.

== Reception ==
=== Audience viewership ===
Nielsen Media Research, which measures the number of minutes watched by United States audiences on television sets, listed WandaVision as the third most-watched original streaming series for the week of February 1 to 7, 2021. 589 million minutes were viewed across the available five episodes, the highest for the series at that point.

=== Critical response ===
The review aggregator website Rotten Tomatoes reported a 100% approval rating, with an average score of 8.40/10 based on 26 reviews. The site's critical consensus reads, "'On a Very Special Episode...' of WandaVision, there are no new answers, but some well played twists open the door for a host of new questions—and one very unexpected guest."

Stephen Robinson at The A.V. Club said Maximoff confronting the S.W.O.R.D. agents outside the anomaly was the "oh shit" moment of the episode, noting how Maximoff's Sokovian accent returned for this scene. Robinson gave the episode a "B". Writing for Entertainment Weekly, Chancellor Agard said the episode lived up to its title and enjoyed seeing Elizabeth Olsen continue to "flesh Wanda out", creating a performance that makes the character "painfully human", pointing to the standoff with S.W.O.R.D. as an example. Christian Holub, Agard's colleague, likened the scene where Maximoff begins playing the sitcom's credits to avoid talking with Vision to the short film Too Many Cooks (2014). Rosie Knight, reviewing the episode for Den of Geek, stated "It seems nearly impossible to follow an episode like 'We Interrupt This Program', but as we hit the midpoint of the season the team behind WandaVision has managed it". She thought the episode's two storylines worked well together, and said the aging of Tommy and Billy was a "creepy and narratively convenient conceit that works to the episode's advantage". Knight also highlighted the strong performances from Olsen and Bettany. Writing for Rolling Stone, Alan Sepinwall said "On a Very Special Episode" was the "liveliest, most engrossing, and purely entertaining episode" of the series so far and may have made the "laborious" early episodes worth it.

Matt Purslow of IGN gave "On a Very Special Episode..." an 8 out of 10, saying it tore up the series' established rule book and almost achieved the ideal balance between family sitcom and MCU drama. Though Purslow enjoyed seeing the sitcom elements alongside the activities of S.W.O.R.D. outside the sitcom reality, the combining of the two storylines came at the expense of the sitcom homages overall, with an "ever-perfect" theme song and wardrobe choices but fewer jokes. He hoped future episodes could retain the balance of jokes and darker material. Additionally, he felt Vision beginning to understand what was occurring made for some of the series' strongest sequences, but felt Tommy and Billy were "blank stereotype children" and were not worth the audience investing in. After thinking the first four episodes were "bland" and "treaded water", Vulture's Abraham Riesman said he was genuinely excited to see what would come next in the series after this episode, but was still not fully on board and gave it 3 stars out of 5. The episode's theme song and opening titles were praised, with Robinson calling the theme song "treacly" and comparing the title sequence to the "paint-by-numbers cast 'portrait'" sequence of Family Ties, and Riesman saying it was the most artistically interesting part of the episode with Anderson-Lopez and Lopez's singing being "genuinely wonderful".

Many reviewers discussed Evan Peters' appearance as the "recast" Pietro. Generally described as surprising and exciting, it was noted how Peters played the character similarly to his version from the X-Men films, with /Film's Ethan Saathoff feeling Peters put a "Fonzie-like spin" on the character which fit the 1980s sitcom setting. Other aspects of his appearance fit within the sitcom timeframe, such as Peters wearing a 1980s version of his costume from the X-Men films, and referencing past role recastings in sitcoms such as the two Darrin Stephens actors on Bewitched, the two Becky Conner actresses on Roseanne, and the two Vivian Banks actresses on The Fresh Prince of Bel-Air. The appearance was believed to help set up the idea of the multiverse that would be explored in further Phase Four properties, and a way to begin to introduce mutants to the MCU. Polygon's Matt Patches called the appearance a "haunting vibe" and "both a nod to the knotted rights issues" that previously applied to the character before Disney acquired 21st Century Fox and also a "mind-bender on its own". Jack Shepard at Total Film said the general response to WandaVision lacked the "fervor" received by the Disney+ Star Wars series The Mandalorian, but he felt Peters' appearance would "rocket" the series into the "social consciousness", which he compared to the introduction of Grogu in The Mandalorian. Conversely, Agard and Riesman felt the appearance was "very fan-servicey" and would be lost on casual viewers.

=== Accolades ===
For the 73rd Primetime Creative Arts Emmy Awards, Nona Khodai was nominated for Outstanding Single-Camera Picture Editing for a Limited or Anthology Series or Movie for her work on the episode.
