= Timer (film) =

TiMER
- Promotional poster
- Directed by: Jac Schaeffer
- Written by: Jac Schaeffer
- Produced by: Jennifer Glynn; Rikki Jarrett; Jac Schaeffer
- Starring: Emma Caulfield; Michelle Borth; John Patrick Amedori; Desmond Harrington; JoBeth Williams; Kali Rocha
- Cinematography: Harris Charalambous
- Edited by: Peter Samet
- Music by: Andrew Kaiser
- Production company: Truckbeef
- Distributed by: Present Pictures; Capewatch Pictures; CDF Pictures
- Release dates: April 26, 2009 (Tribeca); May 14, 2010 (United States)
- Running time: 99 minutes
- Country: United States
- Language: English

Timer (stylized as TiMER) is a 2009 science fiction romantic comedy film written, produced, and directed by Jac Schaeffer in her directorial debut. The plot concerns a device that counts down to the day a person meets their soulmate.

== Plot ==
The concept of a TiMER is that a wrist implant is available that counts down to the day when the user will meet their soulmate.

Oona, a Los Angeles orthodontist, has a blank TiMER, meaning her soulmate is not equipped with one. Searching for her soulmate, Oona brings her latest TiMER-less boyfriend to get a TiMER installed, but the TiMERs do not match, and they part ways.

Oona's stepsister and roommate, Steph, has a TiMER indicating that she will not meet her soulmate for over 15 years. Steph's lifestyle includes one-night stands with men whose TiMERs are about to expire, and she encourages Oona toward similar behavior. Meanwhile, their brother Jessie has his TiMER implanted during his freshman year of high school, and it immediately activates, indicating that he will meet his soulmate almost immediately- his soulmate turns out to be the daughter of the family's housekeeper.

Oona gravitates toward Mikey, a young grocery store clerk who encourages her to live in the present. Mikey's TiMER only has a few months left. Steph meets Dan, a newcomer to Los Angeles, and invites him to her bar intending to introduce him to Oona, who does not show up because she is with Mikey. Steph and Dan flirt. Dan confesses that his wife died; he does not have a TiMER because he believes she was "his one".

When Mikey meets Steph and the sisters argue, Mikey reveals that his TiMER was fake: a programmable sticker. Oona is angry, but realizes she was more herself with him because of it. With Oona's 30th birthday approaching, she feels pressure from her mother to find her soulmate. Steph and Oona decide to have their TiMERs removed, claiming that they are moving on and the results no longer matter.

Steph has hers removed and is visibly relieved. During Oona's turn, her countdown abruptly starts, signifying that her soulmate has gotten a TiMER. It indicates that she will meet her soulmate the next day. Steph encourages her to remove it anyway, but a conflicted Oona decides to keep it. An angry Steph leaves Oona to think it over.

The next day is Oona and Steph's birthday, and their parents throw them a party, inviting Mikey and Dan. Steph and Oona, still fighting, arrive separately. Oona looks for Steph, but sees Dan. Her TiMER goes off, because Dan purchased a TiMER: being with Steph made him not want to be alone. Mikey runs off before Oona can talk to him, and Oona finds Steph and Dan arguing. The sisters fight and Oona leaves.

The next day, Oona visits Mikey and shows him she had her TiMER removed and says she does not care about the results. Mikey is grateful for the gesture, but insists that the results matter, and they say goodbye. The next morning, Steph reconciles with Oona. Oona goes for a run at the track later than she usually does, and runs into Dan practicing with his relay team, learning they use the same track, but at different times. They part with the promise of meeting again.

== Cast ==
- Emma Caulfield as Oona O'Leary
- Michelle Borth as Steph DePaul
- John Patrick Amedori as Mikey Evers
- Desmond Harrington as Dan "The Man"
- JoBeth Williams as Marion DePaul
- Kali Rocha as Patty, The Matchmaker
- John Ingle as Dutch

== Reception ==
On review aggregator Rotten Tomatoes, the film holds an approval rating of 67% based on 15 reviews, and an average rating of 6.2/10.

Neil Genzlinger of the New York Times wrote: "Some of Ms. Schaeffer's plot twists are easy to guess, but every one's enjoyable to watch.
