= We Interrupt This Program =

- WandaVision episode
- Promotional poster for the episode
- Episode no.: Episode 4
- Directed by: Matt Shakman
- Written by: Bobak Esfarjani; Megan McDonnell
- Cinematography by: Jess Hall
- Editing by: Tim Roche
- Original release date: January 29, 2021
- Running time: 35 minutes

Cast
- Josh Stamberg as Tyler Hayward; Alan Heckner as Agent Monti; Selena Anduze as Agent Rodriguez; Lana Young as Dr. Highland; Zac Henry as Agent Franklin / beekeeper

Episode chronology
← Previous "Now in Color"	Next → "On a Very Special Episode..."

"We Interrupt This Program" is the fourth episode of the American television miniseries WandaVision, based on Marvel Comics featuring the characters Wanda Maximoff / Scarlet Witch and Vision. It follows an investigation of the idyllic sitcom life that Maximoff and Vision are living in the town of Westview, New Jersey. The episode is set in the Marvel Cinematic Universe (MCU), sharing continuity with the films of the franchise. It was written by Bobak Esfarjani and Megan McDonnell, and directed by Matt Shakman.

Paul Bettany and Elizabeth Olsen reprise their respective roles as Vision and Wanda Maximoff from the film series, with Teyonah Parris, Randall Park, Kat Dennings, and Kathryn Hahn also starring. Development began by October 2018, and Shakman joined in August 2019. The episode is the first to depict the events of the series from the real world of the MCU rather than from inside Maximoff's sitcom reality. It opens with Monica Rambeau (Parris) returning from the Blip, which is depicted in a darker way than the comedic version of the event previously seen in the MCU. Filming took place in the Atlanta metropolitan area in Atlanta, Georgia, including at Pinewood Atlanta Studios, and in Los Angeles.

"We Interrupt This Program" was released on the streaming service Disney+ on January 29, 2021. Critics praised the episode for answering some of the series' mysteries, and also highlighted the episode's opening sequence as well as the performances of Parris, Park, and Dennings.

== Plot ==
Captain Monica Rambeau, an agent of S.W.O.R.D., returns to life following the Blip (Note: As depicted in Avengers: Endgame (2019).) only to find that her mother, Maria, died of cancer three years prior. Three weeks later, Rambeau returns to work and is told by acting S.W.O.R.D. Director Tyler Hayward that she will be assigned to terrestrial missions only, as her mother had directed before her death for anyone that returned from the Blip. She is subsequently sent to help FBI agent Jimmy Woo with a missing persons case in Westview, New Jersey. They speak to two police officers who insist that Westview does not exist, despite the town's presence directly behind them. Woo explains to Rambeau that he can not physically enter the town due to an unknown psychic force. They discover a hexagonal static CMBR field surrounding the town, which Rambeau is pulled into. Within 24 hours, S.W.O.R.D. establishes a base around the town and sends drones to investigate.

Astrophysics expert Dr. Darcy Lewis is brought in to study the phenomenon. She discovers television broadcast signals coming from the field and, using vintage televisions, finds the transmissions are for the sitcom WandaVision. S.W.O.R.D. personnel use the show to observe events inside the town, learning that the real residents have been "cast" as characters, Rambeau is "Geraldine", and Vision is alive despite his death five years prior. (Note: As depicted in Avengers: Infinity War (2018).) Lewis and Woo attempt to make radio contact with Wanda Maximoff. S.W.O.R.D. agent Franklin crawls through the sewer system in an attempt to enter Westview, but his suit is transformed into beekeeper attire and his tether detaches and turns into a jump rope at the edge of the static field. When Geraldine mentions Ultron, Maximoff violently casts her out of the town which Lewis and Woo realize is censored from the broadcast. The sitcom illusion disappears, and Maximoff sees her husband Vision appear as he did when he died. Horrified, she restores the illusion. Rambeau wakes up at the S.W.O.R.D. base and is surrounded by agents. She tells them that Wanda is controlling the illusion.

== Production ==
=== Development ===
By October 2018, Marvel Studios was developing a limited series starring Elizabeth Olsen's Wanda Maximoff and Paul Bettany's Vision from the Marvel Cinematic Universe (MCU) films. In August 2019, Matt Shakman was hired to direct the miniseries. He and head writer Jac Schaeffer executive produced alongside Marvel Studios' Kevin Feige, Louis D'Esposito, and Victoria Alonso. Feige described the series as part sitcom, part "Marvel epic". The fourth episode, "We Interrupt This Program", was written by Bobak Esfarjani and Megan McDonnell, and shifts the series' perspective to outside the sitcom reality of the previous episodes. Schaeffer originally pitched it as being similar to an episode of CSI: Crime Scene Investigation, in order to shift the series to a new genre after taking influence from sitcoms for the first three episodes.

=== Writing ===
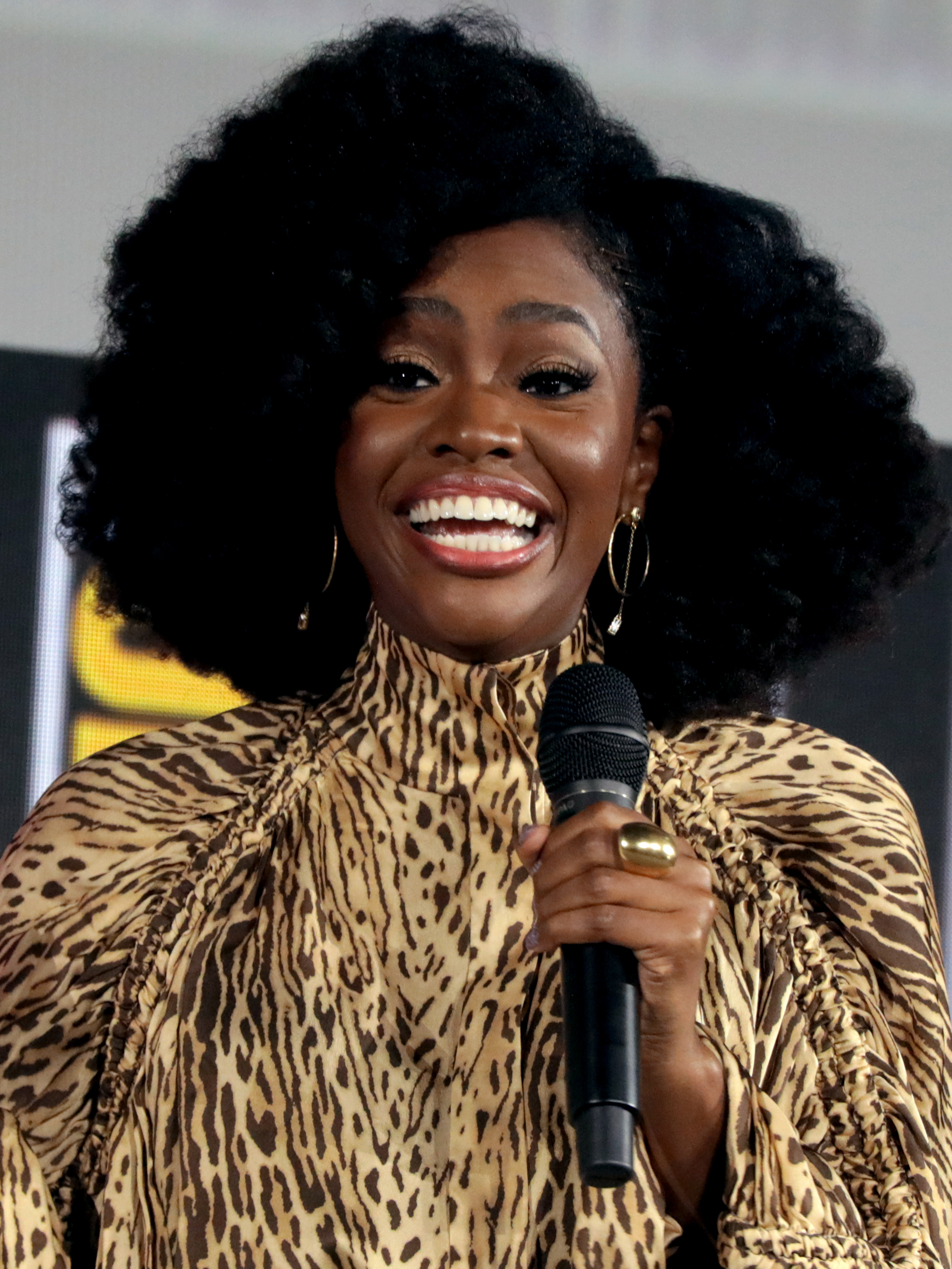
The episode switches the series' perspective from the previous three episodes, instead starring Teyonah Parris as Monica Rambeau outside the sitcom reality.

After the release of the series' first three episodes, Schaeffer acknowledged that they would need to provide answers to those episodes' mysteries soon. Olsen said the fourth episode would be "quite a shift. It's a really fun perspective swap and I think a lot gets understood at that moment." Schaeffer had found the central idea of Maximoff being responsible for the series' sitcom reality to be a simple concept, and felt it would be satisfying to fans to introduce it as a mystery first before explaining the story from the perspective of Monica Rambeau and S.W.O.R.D. in the fourth episode. She noted that this turned the episode into an "enormous info dump" for the audience, but hoped that all the answers would help viewers see the rest of the series as an "emotional and a psychological journey, rather than a sneaky mystery the whole way".

Because of the large amount of information that needs to be conveyed in the episode, Esfarjani had only a small amount of time to introduce Rambeau as an empathetic character. The writers discussed starting the episode with a more traditional character introduction sequence such as having Rambeau working out, training, or spending time with a dog, but they felt this lacked emotion. When the idea of her returning to life following the Blip, due to the events of Avengers: Endgame (2019), was suggested, Esfarjani felt it placed her in the most empathetic moment from the MCU and sped up the process of the audience becoming attached to Rambeau as a protagonist while also quickly clarifying where the series is set on the MCU timeline. Schaeffer added that the sequence sets the tone for the rest of the episode while also digging into Rambeau's character by setting her up on a "rough road". As part of the latter point, the writers decided to reveal that Rambeau's mother Maria has died during the time that Rambeau had disappeared. Schaeffer said this was a tough decision since she has strong feelings about Maria and her relationship with her daughter from their earlier appearances in the film Captain Marvel (2019). Lashana Lynch, who portrayed Maria in Captain Marvel, was informed of this decision before the show premiered. After many conversations about how to portray people returning from the Blip, the writers and producers decided to set the sequence in a hospital as an interesting place to depict the scariness and confusion of the event from Rambeau's perspective. This is different from the portrayal of the Blip in Spider-Man: Far From Home (2019), which has a more comedic tone, and Schaeffer explained that Marvel Studios was happy for the series' tone to be different as long as the visuals matched with those seen in Far From Home.

For S.W.O.R.D. and their base outside Westview, Schaeffer was influenced by the film Arrival (2016). She was also inspired by series with structural shifts for moving this episode away from sitcom homages to provide answers and a different perspective; examples of these influential series and episodes include Russian Doll and its fourth episode "Alan's Routine", the sixth episode of Escape at Dannemora, the Girls episode "The Panic at Central Park", and Lost. Rambeau, Jimmy Woo, and Darcy Lewis represent the series' viewers since they are watching the fictional WandaVision sitcom and have similar questions to those asked by viewers of the series' first three episodes. Schaeffer described Woo and Lewis as "helper characters" with supporting roles in the MCU films and expressed excitement at getting to spend more time with them in this episode than was done in the films. Schaeffer's initial ideas for the series included the idea that Maximoff's abilities create cosmic microwave background radiation (CMBR), since in the real world that is radiation from the creation of the universe that is visible in television static. McDonnell did further research on CMBR for the episode.

=== Casting ===
The episode stars Paul Bettany as Vision, Elizabeth Olsen as Wanda Maximoff, Teyonah Parris as Monica Rambeau, Randall Park as Jimmy Woo, Kat Dennings as Darcy Lewis, and Kathryn Hahn as Agnes. Also appearing in the episode are Josh Stamberg as S.W.O.R.D. Director Tyler Hayward, Alan Heckner as S.W.O.R.D. Agent Monti, Selena Anduze as S.W.O.R.D. Agent Rodriguez, Lana Young as Dr. Highland, and Zac Henry as S.W.O.R.D. Agent Franklin / the beekeeper. Archival audio from the film Captain Marvel of Brie Larson as Carol Danvers / Captain Marvel speaking to a young Monica Rambeau is heard at the start of the episode.

=== Filming ===
Soundstage filming occurred at Pinewood Atlanta Studios in Atlanta, Georgia, with Shakman directing, and Jess Hall serving as cinematographer. Filming also took place in the Atlanta metropolitan area, with backlot and outdoor filming occurring in Los Angeles when the series resumed production after being on hiatus due to the COVID-19 pandemic. The episode's opening sequence features a choreographed one-er that follows Rambeau through the hospital as people return from the Blip, using a handheld camera and natural lighting from the hospital environment. Hall noted that they had been unable to use any of those elements in the previous episodes due to the "vocabulary" of their sitcom settings. Dennings found it difficult to act against the monitors seen throughout the episode since she only knew loosely what would be shown on them, with the actual footage added in post-production. She said trying to imagine the footage helped the feeling of solving a mystery. A practical stunt was filmed for when Maximoff throws Rambeau out of her house, with multiple breakaway walls built on set that Parris and her stunt double could be thrown through. An area past the fake walls was lit to match an outside environment, but the production did not have a long enough run to film the stunt that far so the change in lighting from inside to outside had to be created with visual effects.

=== Visual effects ===
Tara DeMarco served as the visual effects supervisor for WandaVision, with the episode's visual effects created by The Yard VFX, Industrial Light & Magic, Rodeo FX, Monsters Aliens Robots Zombies (MARZ), Framestore, Cantina Creative, RISE, Digital Domain, and SSVFX. Rodeo FX developed the visual effects for the Hex boundary, based on the magnetization of old CRT television screens when brought into contact with magnets. The boundary is depicted as clear and difficult to see, as Shakman wanted it to be mysterious and unsettling for the audience. The moire pattern that can be seen when Rambeau touches the boundary was specifically based on footage that Rodeo shot of themselves experimenting with magnets and televisions. Rodeo also created Westview for when it appears in the background of shots in the episode. Supervisor Julien Héry said there were a lot of small details added to the town to make it look realistic without drawing attention, such as traffic lights, trash cans, and fire hydrants. Cantina Creative designed and animated graphics for the devices in the episode, including S.W.O.R.D.'s holographic table and monitors as well as the devices used to monitor the Hex's CMBR levels.

DeMarco used Vision's introduction in Avengers: Age of Ultron (2015) as the definitive version of the character when approaching the visual effects for him in WandaVision. Bettany wore a bald cap and face makeup on set to match Vision's color, as well as tracking markers for the visual effects teams to reference. Complex 3D and digital makeup techniques were then used to create the character, with sections of Bettany's face replaced with CGI on a shot-by-shot basis; the actor's eyes, nose, and mouth were usually the only elements retained. The brief appearance of dead Vision was created by Digital Domain, who explained that the hole in the character's head where the Mind Stone was ripped out by Thanos in Avengers: Infinity War (2018) could not be created with practical effects. For those shots, Digital Domain completely replaced Bettany's head with a digital Vision head based on his appearance at the end of Infinity War. They then match-moved Bettany's facial performance for his eyes, nose, and mouth onto the digital model.

DeMarco and her team looked at the Blip scene in Infinity War as reference for Rambeau's "un-Blip" in the episode, so they could match the general look of the effects to the film, though Marvel gave the team freedom to alter the effect as needed for the series. Shakman in particular wanted to match with the Blip effect that was used for Nick Fury at the end of Infinity War, which he described as "slow and lyrical". Instead of making the "un-Blip" be a direct reversal of the Blip effect, which would mean Rambeau forming out of ash and then regaining her color, the team adjusted the process to bring color into the ash as it was forming so it would be less "creepy".

=== Music ===
Composer Christophe Beck said that, as a Marvel fan, the episode's opening sequence gave him goosebumps when he first watched it, and he was pleased with the intensity of the music he wrote that "brought out the chaos in that moment". He introduced a new theme for Rambeau in the scene. "Voodoo Child (Slight Return)" by the Jimi Hendrix Experience is featured in the episode. A soundtrack album for the episode was released digitally by Marvel Music and Hollywood Records on February 5, 2021, featuring Beck's score.

WandaVision: Episode 4 (Original Soundtrack)
No.	Title	Length
1.	"The Awakening"	2:19
2.	"Three Weeks Later"	2:17
3.	"Westview"	2:42
4.	"S.W.O.R.D."	1:01
5.	"The Players"	2:02
6.	"Stay Tuned"	2:28
7.	"Everything Is Under Control"	1:01
8.	"Mission Failure"	1:48
9.	"Who Are You?"	2:35
Total length:		18:13

== Marketing ==
After the episode began streaming, Marvel released a poster featuring the characters and events depicted in "We Interrupt This Program". Bleeding Cool's Ray Flook felt the poster design was showing "the walls between realities... falling apart faster than Wanda can fix them". Adam Barnhardt at ComicBook.com felt the flower pattern wallpaper in the center of the poster between Vision and Agnes looked like "an evil distorted face", and speculated that this could be a tease for Mephisto given the design had the character's "classic hair and cowl". Barnhardt also noted how the wallpaper had been used on past posters for the series, yet this arrangement of the flowers had not been seen before. Math Erao of Comic Book Resources highlighted the obscured character between Agnes and Jimmy Woo who was likely Agent Franklin, questioning why that character would be so obscured when the other S.W.O.R.D. agents in the background were more defined. Also after the episode's release, Marvel announced merchandise inspired by the episode as part of its weekly "Marvel Must Haves" promotion for each episode of the series, including t-shirts, accessories, houseware, and jewelry, focusing on S.W.O.R.D. and Monica Rambeau. In March 2021, Marvel partnered with chef Justin Warner to release a recipe for Lewis's All-Nighter Noodle Cup based on the cup of noodles Lewis eats in the episode.

== Release ==
"We Interrupt This Program" was released on the streaming service Disney+ on January 29, 2021. The episode, along with the rest of WandaVision, was released on Ultra HD Blu-ray and Blu-ray on November 28, 2023.

== Reception ==
=== Audience viewership ===
Nielsen Media Research, which measures the number of minutes watched by United States audiences on television sets, listed WandaVision as the fifth most-watched original streaming series for the week of January 25 to 31, 2021. 431 million minutes were viewed across the available first four episodes.

=== Critical response ===
The review aggregator website Rotten Tomatoes reported a 92% approval rating with an average score of 8.10/10 based on 26 reviews. The site's critical consensus reads, "'We Interrupt This Program' takes a break from Westview to give the excellent Teyonah Parris' Monica Rambeau some welcome backstory while introducing a few familiar faces to the world of WandaVision."

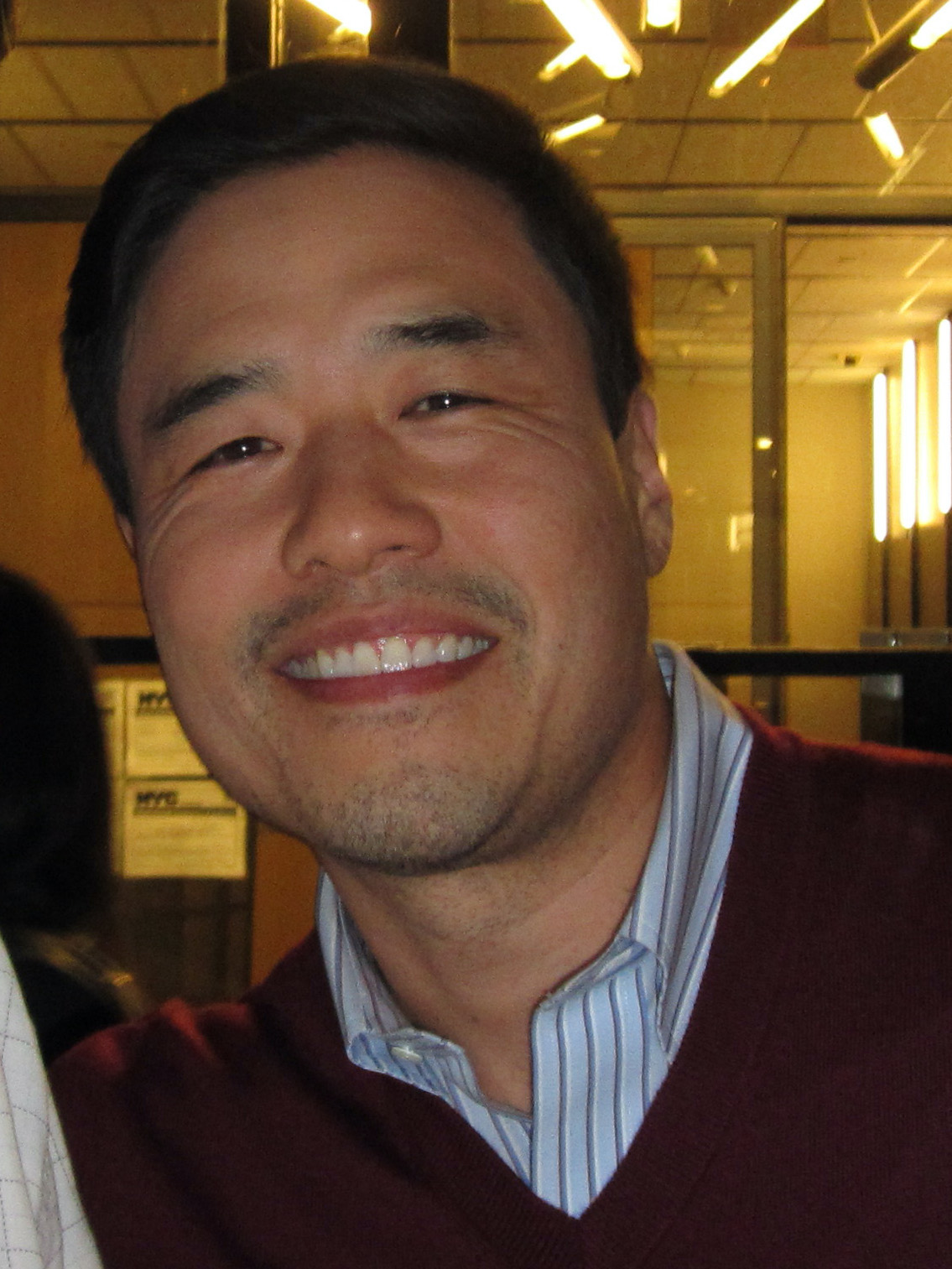
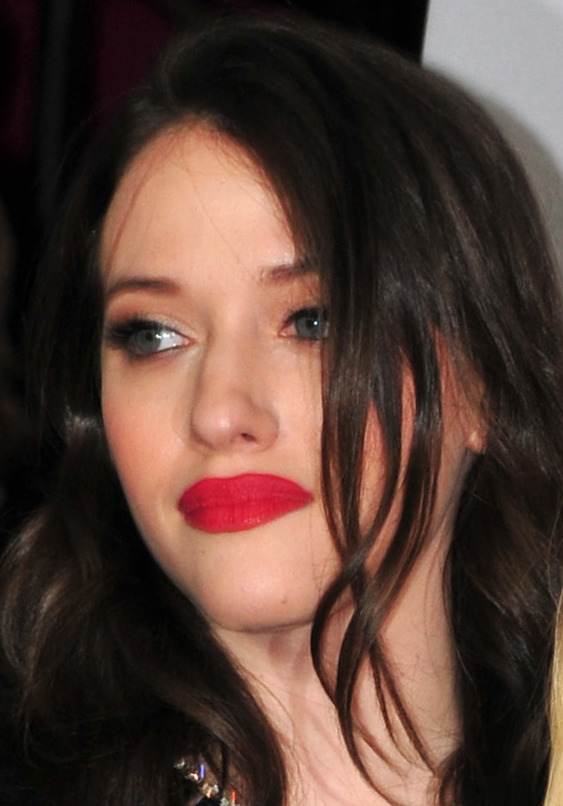
The appearances of Randall Park and Kat Dennings, reprising their roles from MCU films in the episode, were noted by critics.

Charles Pulliam-Moore at io9 was thankful that the episode switched perspectives to Rambeau, calling this an effective way to answer the audience's questions and show the previous episodes in a new light. He also highlighted the horror of the opening sequence. The A.V. Club's Stephen Robinson said the episode both provided answers and ramps up the suspense, giving it an "A−". He compared it to The X-Files as well as The Prisoner episode "Living in Harmony", and said the appearance of deceased Vision made him "gasp in horror". Robinson felt this visual hit "even harder after seeing a funny, lovable Vision over the past three episodes". Matt Purslow at IGN believed the episode's title was a very accurate description for the episode. He noted that learning Maximoff had created the reality to deal with her grief lined up with initial fan theories about the series, and said the reveal was "strongly presented" with Olsen's portrayal of a darker Maximoff being similar to when she faced Thanos in Avengers: Endgame. Purslow gave the episode an 8 out of 10. Entertainment Weekly's Christian Holub also felt the episode's title was perfect. His colleague Chancellor Agard said he was normally not a fan of episodes that recap past events such as this one, but enjoyed this because it meant the series was not withholding basic information from the audience for too long and also that the mysteries were not "the point" of the series. Writing for /Film, Evan Saathoff was positive that the episode "breaks the whole thing open", but was disappointed that the series' sitcom format would potentially not remain for the rest of its episodes.

The Hollywood Reporter's Richard Newby praised Lewis and Woo's character growth since their last appearances in Thor: The Dark World (2013) and Ant-Man and the Wasp (2018), respectively, which he felt was one of the benefits that comes from the MCU's long-form storytelling. Agard said the episode was the one he had been waiting for due to its focus on Lewis and Woo, and felt Dennings returned to her role effortlessly, while Purslow enjoyed seeing Rambeau, Lewis, and Woo solving the mystery, as well as the other references to the MCU. Alec Bojalad at Den of Geek highlighted the performances of Park and Dennings, and gave the episode 4.5 out of 5 stars. Bolalad described the episode as "wildly thrilling and entertaining" and the most coherent episode of the series so far, which he felt made it the best.

Vulture's Abraham Riesman gave the episode 3 out of 5 stars and was disappointed to learn that the sitcom reality was being created by Maximoff, which he felt was the "easy way out with this rich and fascinating character" and was a "dull and predictable [choice], not to mention questionable on gender-stereotype grounds". He also felt the jokes in the episode fell flat and were a parody of the MCU's humor: "all dumb punch-up asides and 'soooo, that happened' buttons". Ben Travers was also critical of the episode's humor and dialogue, as well as its answers to questions that he felt the audience had already worked out, without any insight into Maximoff's character. Travers gave the episode a "C+".

=== Analysis ===
James Whitbrook at io9 said the opening scene, in which Monica Rambeau returns from the Blip, was "brilliant" and felt it was the closest thing to horror within the MCU. Whitbrook contrasted it with what was shown of the Blip in Spider-Man: Far From Home, which played the moment for comedic effect, noting instead the claustrophobic nature, Rambeau's confusion, and the scene's soundscape of screaming against the sound of Rambeau's heartbeat. He felt the scene established Rambeau's state of mind for the rest of the series and also reflected WandaVision's tonal shift from sitcom homages to the "dark, stark reality". Newby believed the scene offered a new perspective on the Blip from what was seen in Far From Home, and opened up "myriad storytelling possibilities" for the MCU with a "new status quo, new agencies of power, new adversaries, and familiar supporting faces ready to emerge as more prominent heroes". He said the Blip was the "greatest storytelling decision" in the MCU since Nick Fury appeared in the post-credits scene of Iron Man (2008).

Newby said having Rambeau, Lewis, and Woo serve as surrogates for the audience in the episode showed how much the MCU had changed for its human, non-superhero characters. Margaret David at Comic Book Resources described the three characters' roles in this episode as a "cheeky acknowledgement of fandom". David highlighted Lewis's transition from discovering the WandaVision broadcast with astrophysics to watching the fictional series and becoming "every theorist on Reddit looking for the clues", as well as Woo's use of a whiteboard and pin wall to organize information which is standard for police procedurals but in this case is "recognizable as every Marvel YouTuber breaking down viewer questions". David said this was "next-level metafiction", and compared it to a scene in the It's Always Sunny in Philadelphia episode "Sweet Dee Has a Heart Attack" which was also directed by Shakman. That episode is the source of a famous meme in which Charlie Day's Charlie Kelly wildly gestures at a similar whiteboard. Pulliam-Moore said this element of the episode felt like WandaVision was "flexing", with the series "poking fun at itself, its audience, and the entire culture around superhero adaptations".
