= Megan McDonnell =

American screenwriter

- Education: Harvard University (BA); University of Southern California (MFA)
- Occupation: Screenwriter
- Years active: 2015–present
- Notable work: WandaVision; The Marvels

Megan McDonnell is an American screenwriter best known for her work on Marvel Cinematic Universe projects WandaVision (2021) and The Marvels (2023).

== Education ==
McDonnell attended Harvard University as an undergraduate, where she was a member of the Hasty Pudding Club.

She graduated from the Peter Stark Producing Program at USC with an MFA in 2016.

== Career ==
McDonnell began her career as the co-director and executive producer on the 2016 short film Meet Cute. She then rose to prominence after writing two episodes of the Disney+ series WandaVision, set in the Marvel Cinematic Universe (MCU). In January 2020, she entered negotiations to write the screenplay for the 2023 MCU film The Marvels, and she eventually co-wrote the film with Nia DaCosta and Elissa Karasik. In August 2022, she wrote episodes for the Marvel Studios series Agatha All Along.

Prior to 2019, McDonnell was the producer for the Scriptnotes podcast. As of 2026, she was co-developing a potential series for Sony Pictures Television and Amazon Prime Video based on Spider-Man-related characters alongside Ben Nedivi and Matt Wolpert.

== Filmography ==
Year	Title	Director	Writer	Producer	Other	Notes
2015	The Perceivers	No	No	No	Yes	Short film; Production assistant
2016	Meet Cute	Yes	No	Yes	No	Short film; Co-director and executive producer
2021	WandaVision	No	Yes	No	No	Episodes: "Now in Color" and "We Interrupt This Program"
2023	The Marvels	No	Yes	No	No	Co-wrote screenplay with Nia DaCosta and Elissa Karasik
2024	Dark Matter	No	Yes	No	No	Wrote 3 episodes
2024	Agatha All Along	No	Yes	Yes	No	Consulting producer, on-set writer
2026	VisionQuest	No	No	Yes	No	Consulting producer
