= Tricia Sawyer =

American make-up artist

- Born: April 6 Pasadena, California
- Education: Joe Blasco Make-Up School
- Occupation: Make-up artist

Tricia Sawyer (born April 6 in Pasadena, California) is an American make-up artist in the film and print industry.

== Career ==
She has worked extensively in the motion picture industry as a personal artist to Sharon Stone, Lindsay Lohan, Sylvester Stallone, Gina Gershon, Kate Beckinsale, Brittany Murphy, Michael Douglas, Geena Davis, Scarlett Johansson and Jessica Alba. She has also done several films as department head, along with countless print campaigns, media, awards, and television shows. Sawyer's work for TV series Mad Men was nominated for Emmy Award in 2011.

Sawyer began her career at the Joe Blasco Make-Up School in Los Angeles at the age of 18. After graduating, Sawyer started her film career working as an artist with Roger Corman's Concorde/New Horizons, and on several music videos, most notably productions for Alice Cooper, Ozzy Osbourne and Janet Jackson.

In 1992, Sawyer worked with Sharon Stone on "Where Sleeping Dogs Lie," which was the first of twenty feature films on which they would work together.

Sawyer joined the IATSE union at 22, and acted as department head on her first union film Sliver.

Sawyer became the spokesperson for Prescriptives Cosmetics in 1995 where she was responsible for the re-design of the existing color line up along with design of new collections. After a four-year spokesperson run, she stayed on at Estée Lauder as an independent development consultant.

She is the CEO of Tricia Sawyer Beauty, Inc. which produces a variety of prosumer cosmetics, most notably Full Potential Foundation which contains 55% pigment as compared to the industry standard of 10% pigment.

Tricia was the department makeup head for the House of Cards series.

== Personal life ==
She currently resides in the Homeland neighborhood of Baltimore, Maryland.

== Filmography ==
=== Films ===
Year	Film	As	Notes
2008	Labor Pains	Makeup artist for Lindsay Lohan	in production
2008	Happy Tears	Makeup artist for Demi Moore	in production
2008	The Love Guru	Makeup artist for Jessica Alba	release 2008
2007	The Year of Getting to Know Us	Makeup artist for Sharon Stone	release 2008
2007	I Know Who Killed Me	Makeup artist for Lindsay Lohan	release 2007
2007	If I Had Known I Was a Genius	Makeup artist for Sharon Stone	release 2007
2007	When a Man Falls in the Forest	Makeup artist for Sharon Stone	release 2007
2006	The Holiday	Makeup artist for Lindsay Lohan and James Franco	
2006	Bobby	Makeup artist for Sharon Stone	
2006	Clerks II	Key makeup artist	
2006	Huff - Sweet Release (TV)	Makeup artist for Sharon Stone	TV Episode
2006	Huff - Whipped Doggie (TV)	Makeup artist for Sharon Stone	TV Episode
2006	Huff - Maps Don't Talk (TV)	Makeup artist for Sharon Stone	TV Episode
2006	Huff - Maps Don't Talk 2 (TV)	Makeup artist for Sharon Stone	TV Episode
2006	Basic Instinct 2	Makeup artist for Sharon Stone	
2004	In Good Company	Makeup artist for Scarlett Johansson	
2004	Little Black Book	Makeup artist for Brittany Murphy	
2004	3-Way	Makeup artist for Gina Gershon	
2003	Tiptoes	Makeup artist for Kate Beckingsale	
2003	Uptown Girls	Makeup artist for Brittany Murphy	
2003	Just Married	Makeup department head	
2002	D-Tox	Makeup artist: Sylvester Stallone	
2001	Don't Say a Word	Makeup artist for Michael Douglas	
2001	Driven	makeup artist: Sylvester Stallone and Gina Gershon	
2000	Get Carter	Makeup artist for Sylvester Stallone	
2000	Beautiful Joe	Makeup artist for Sharon Stone	
2000	If These Walls Could Talk 2 (TV)	makeup artist: Sharon Stone	Television film
1999	Simpatico	Makeup artist for Sharon Stone	
1999	The Muse	Makeup artist for Sharon Stone	
1998	The Mighty	Makeup artist for Sharon Stone	
1998	Sphere	Mkeup artist for Sharon Stone	
1996	The Long Kiss Goodnight	Makeup artist for Geena Davis	
1996	Last Dance	Makeup artist for Sharon Stone	
1996	Diabolique	Makeup artist for Sharon Stone	
1995	Casino	Makeup artist for Sharon Stone	
1995	The Quick and the Dead	Makeup artist: Sharon Stone	
1994	The Specialist	Makeup artist for Sharon Stone	
1994	Intersection	Makeup artist for Sharon Stone	
1993	Last Action Hero	Makeup artist for Sharon Stone	
1993	Sliver	Key makeup	
1993	White Wolves: A Cry in the Wild II	Key makeup	
1992	Where Sleeping Dogs Lie	makeup artist for Sharon Stone	
1990	Body Chemistry	Makeup artist	
1990	Sorority House Massacre II	Makeup artist	
