= Jac Schaeffer =

American screenwriter and producer (born 1978)

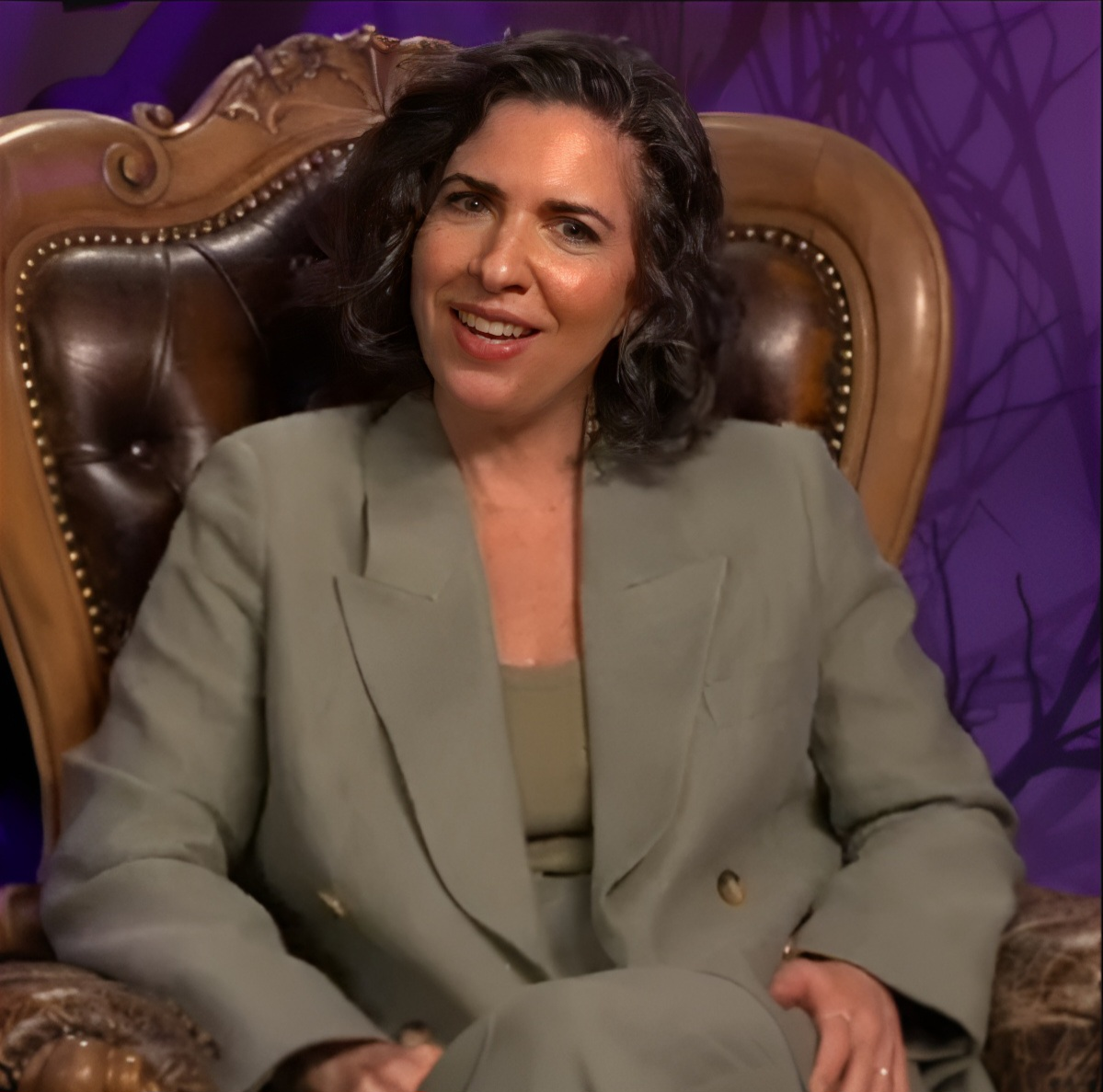
- Schaeffer in 2024
- Born: October 26, 1978 (age 47); Fort Lee, New Jersey, U.S.
- Education: Princeton University (AB); University of Southern California (MFA)
- Occupations: Screenwriter; film director; film producer; television producer
- Years active: 2009–present

Jacqueline Schaeffer (born October 26, 1978) is an American screenwriter and producer best known for her 2009 feature film debut TiMER and for her work in the Marvel Cinematic Universe creating the Disney+ television miniseries WandaVision and Agatha All Along as well as co-writing the initial story to the film Black Widow.

== Life and career ==
Schaeffer grew up in Agoura Hills, California, and was inspired by filmmakers Quentin Tarantino, Robert Rodriguez, Allison Anders, and Lisa Cholodenko as a teenager. Schaeffer graduated from Princeton University with an A.B. in English in 2000 after completing an 81-page senior thesis, titled "Splinter in the Mind: The Dilemma of the Political Dystopian Protagonist and the Cyberpunk Hero", under the supervision of Maria DiBattista. She went on to earn a Master of Fine Arts in Film Production from the USC School of Cinematic Arts. She wrote for the Princeton Triangle Club theatre groupe, where she played versions of herself. She is Jewish on her father's side, and has two children. She wrote, produced and directed her first feature film, a science fiction romantic comedy called TiMER starring Emma Caulfield. The film premiered at the 2009 Tribeca Film Festival and saw a limited US release a year later.

Schaeffer wrote The Hustle, a Dirty Rotten Scoundrels remake starring Anne Hathaway and Rebel Wilson, which was released in May 2019. Schaeffer is also developing her Blacklisted-script The Shower with Hathaway.

Schaeffer contributed to the screenplay for the Marvel Studios film Captain Marvel with Geneva Robertson-Dworet, Anna Boden and Ryan Fleck. The film was released on March 8, 2019.

Schaeffer also wrote the Marvel Studios film Black Widow starring Scarlett Johansson, until she was replaced with Ned Benson, who was in turn replaced by Eric Pearson. She was also hired by Marvel to write the first and final episodes and serve as head writer for the Disney+ miniseries WandaVision, in January 2019. In May 2021, she signed a three-year overall deal with Marvel Studios and 20th Television to develop projects for them, including a WandaVision spin-off titled Agatha All Along (2024), centered on Agatha Harkness. She was also set to work on a second WandaVision spin-off, titled Vision Quest and centered on The Vision, before departing the project by September 2024 due to scheduling issues with Agatha All Along; she still received an executive producer credit on the series. Most recently, she signed an overall deal with Amazon MGM Studios.

== Filmography ==
Year	Title	Director	Writer	Producer	Notes
2009	TiMER	Yes	Yes	Yes	
2017	Olaf's Frozen Adventure	No	Yes	No	Short film
2019	Captain Marvel	No	Uncredited	No	
2019	The Hustle	No	Yes	No	
2021	Black Widow	No	Story	No	

Television series

Year	Title	Director	Writer	Creator	Executive Producer	Notes
2021	WandaVision	No	Yes	Yes	Yes	Wrote 2 episodes
2024	Agatha All Along	Yes	Yes	Yes	Yes	Wrote 2 episodes Directed 3 episodes
2026	VisionQuest	No	No	No	Yes	

== Awards and nominations ==
Year	Award	Category	Nominated work	Result	Ref.
2009	Sitges Film Festival	Best Film	TiMER	Nominated	
2021	Dragon Awards	Best Science Fiction or Fantasy TV Series	WandaVision	Nominated	
2021	Harvey Awards	Best Adaptation from Comic Book/Graphic Novel	WandaVision	Won	
2021	Hollywood Critics Association TV Awards	Best Streaming Limited Series, Anthology Series, or Live-Action Television Movie	WandaVision	Won	
2021	MTV Movie & TV Awards	Best Show	WandaVision	Won	
2021	Nickelodeon Kids' Choice Awards	Favorite Family TV Show	WandaVision	Nominated	
2021	People's Choice Awards	Show of 2021	WandaVision	Nominated	
2021	Primetime Emmy Awards	Outstanding Limited or Anthology Series	WandaVision	Nominated	
2021	Primetime Emmy Awards	Outstanding Writing for a Limited or Anthology Series or Movie	"Filmed Before a Live Studio Audience"	Nominated	
2021	TCA Awards	Program of the Year	WandaVision	Nominated	
2021	TV Choice Awards	Best Family Drama	WandaVision	Nominated	
2022	American Film Institute Awards	Television Programs of the Year	WandaVision	Won (Note: This award does not have a single winner, but recognizes multiple series.)	
2022	Critics' Choice Super Awards	Best Superhero Series	WandaVision	Won	
2022	Critics' Choice Television Awards	Best Limited Series	WandaVision	Nominated	
2022	Hugo Awards	Best Dramatic Presentation, Long Form	WandaVision	Nominated	
2022	Satellite Awards	Best Television Series – Genre	WandaVision	Won	
2022	Saturn Awards	Best Fantasy Series (Streaming)	WandaVision	Nominated	
2022	USC Scripter Awards	Best Adapted TV Screenplay	"Filmed Before a Live Studio Audience"	Nominated	
2022	Writers Guild of America Awards	Adapted Long Form	WandaVision	Nominated	
2025	Critics' Choice Super Awards	Best Superhero Series, Limited Series or Made-For-TV Movie	Agatha All Along	Pending	
2025	Dorian TV Awards	Best LGBTQ TV Show	Agatha All Along	Nominated	
2025	Dorian TV Awards	Best Genre TV Show	Agatha All Along	Nominated	
2025	GLAAD Media Awards	Outstanding New TV Series	Agatha All Along	Won	
2025	Gold Derby Awards	Comedy Series	Agatha All Along	Pending	
2025	Gold Derby Awards	Comedy Episode	"Death's Hand in Mine"	Pending	
2025	Golden Tomato Awards	Best Fantasy Series	Agatha All Along	Nominated	
2025	Gracie Awards	Director – Fantasy	Agatha All Along	Won	
2025	Hugo Awards	Best Dramatic Presentation, Short Form	Agatha All Along	Pending	
2025	Saturn Awards	Best Superhero Television Series	Agatha All Along	Won	
2025	TCA Awards	Outstanding Achievement in Movies, Miniseries or Specials	Agatha All Along	Pending	
2025	Tell-Tale TV Awards	Favorite Limited Series	Agatha All Along	Won	
