= Jess Hall =

British cinematographer

- Born: United Kingdom
- Education: St Martins College of Art & Design; New York University
- Occupation: Cinematographer
- Parents: Stuart Hall (father); Catherine Hall (mother)
- Website: www.jesshalldop.com

Jess Hall ASC, BSC is a British cinematographer.

== Life and career ==
His parents were Stuart Hall, the Jamaican-born Cultural Studies pioneer and former professor at the Open University, and Catherine Hall, a professor and leading historian at University College, London.

Hall studied at New York University as well as St Martins College of Art & Design.

He was the cinematographer for the Scarlett Johansson-starring adaptation of the Japanese anime Ghost in the Shell. He has stated that he sought out a digital camera that could replicate the style anime is shown in.

Hall is based in Los Angeles.

== Filmography ==
Film

| Year | Title | Director | Notes |
|---|---|---|---|
| 2003 | Stander | Bronwen Hughes | |
| 2007 | Hot Fuzz | Edgar Wright | |
| 2007 | Son of Rambow | Garth Jennings | |
| 2008 | Brideshead Revisited | Julian Jarrold | |
| 2009 | Creation | Jon Amiel | |
| 2010 | The Switch | Will Speck; Josh Gordon | |
| 2011 | 30 Minutes or Less | Ruben Fleischer | |
| 2013 | The Spectacular Now | James Ponsoldt | |
| 2014 | Transcendence | Wally Pfister | |
| 2017 | Ghost in the Shell | Rupert Sanders | |
| 2019 | Serenity | Steven Knight | |
| 2022 | Chevalier | Stephen Williams | |
| 2025 | The Fantastic Four: First Steps | Matt Shakman | |

Television

| Year | Title | Director | Notes |
|---|---|---|---|
| 2021 | WandaVision | Matt Shakman | Miniseries |
| 2023 | The Consultant | Matt Shakman | 1 episode |
| 2023 | Monarch: Legacy of Monsters | Matt Shakman | 2 episodes |

== Accolades ==
| Year | Award | Category | Title | Result |
|---|---|---|---|---|
| 2008 | Satellite Awards | Best Cinematography | Brideshead Revisited | Nominated |
