= Familiar by Thy Side =

- Agatha All Along episode
- Promotional poster for Agatha All Along, highlighting the reveal of "Teen" (Joe Locke) to be Billy Maximoff in this episode
- Episode no.: Episode 6
- Directed by: Gandja Monteiro
- Written by: Jason Rostovsky
- Cinematography by: Isiah Donté Lee
- Editing by: Libby Cuenin
- Original release date: October 16, 2024
- Running time: 47 minutes

Cast
- Evan Peters as Ralph Bohner; Maria Dizzia as Rebecca Kaplan; Paul Adelstein as Jeff Kaplan; Miles Gutierrez-Riley as Eddie

Episode chronology
← Previous "Darkest Hour / Wake Thy Power"	Next → "Death's Hand in Mine"

"Familiar by Thy Side" is the sixth episode of the American television miniseries Agatha All Along, based on Marvel Comics featuring the character Agatha Harkness. The episode is set in the Marvel Cinematic Universe (MCU), sharing continuity with the films of the franchise. It was written by Jason Rostovsky and directed by Gandja Monteiro.

The episode follows Billy Maximoff (Joe Locke) as he pieces together the details of his origins and continues his journey on the Witches' Road alongside Agatha Harkness (Kathryn Hahn). Aside from Locke and Hahn, Sasheer Zamata, Ali Ahn, Debra Jo Rupp and Patti LuPone also star in the episode. Filming took place in the Atlanta metropolitan area and in Los Angeles.

"Familiar by Thy Side" was released on the streaming service Disney+ on October 16, 2024. The episode garnered favorable reviews, with critics praising its gradual narrative progression and highlighting Locke and Hahn's performances.

== Plot ==
In 2023, 13-year-old William Kaplan celebrates his bar mitzvah in Eastview, New Jersey. During the party, fortune teller Lilia Calderu reads his palm and observes that his lifeline is split in two. Although she sees something else, she chooses not to reveal it. As William leaves her tent, Calderu casts a protective sigil over him and immediately forgets their encounter.

The celebration is interrupted when the Westview anomaly begins to destabilize, (Note: As depicted in the WandaVision episode "The Series Finale" (2021).) prompting William and his parents to leave. However, distracted by a radio signal from the anomaly, their car crashes. William dies from his injuries, but as he passes, the soul of Billy Maximoff enters his body, resurrecting him. With no memory of either life, Billy is left distraught by his sudden ability to read minds.

Three years later, Billy confesses to his boyfriend, Eddie, that he has never recovered his memories. His investigation into the Westview anomaly leads them to a Reddit user who claims to have lived in Westview—Ralph Bohner. As Bohner recounts his experience under the mind control of Agatha Harkness, Billy begins to realize his true identity.

Billy continues his research into Harkness and the Witches' Road, returning to Westview in hopes of freeing her from the Scarlet Witch's spell and locating his twin brother, Tommy Maximoff. Still under the spell, Harkness captures and interrogates Billy, (Note: As depicted in "Seekest Thou the Road".) but he eventually breaks the enchantment and introduces himself as both William Kaplan and Billy Maximoff. (Note: As depicted in "Circle Sewn with Fate / Unlock Thy Hidden Gate".)

In the present on the Road, Harkness pulls herself from the mud, and confronts Billy, claiming to have had a notion about his true identity all along. Teasing him for poor control over his powers and guessing his goal, she persuades Billy to rejoin her for the next trial.

== Production ==
=== Development ===
In May 2021, Jac Schaeffer, the head writer of WandaVision, signed a three-year overall television deal with Marvel Studios and 20th Television to create new projects for their Disney+ lineup. In pitches for several different projects focused on various characters, Schaeffer consistently suggested including WandaVision character Agatha Harkness, a powerful witch from Marvel Comics, as part of those series. This led to her and Marvel Studios president Kevin Feige pursuing a series centered on that character instead. By October 2021, a "dark comedy" spin-off from WandaVision centered on Kathryn Hahn as Agatha was in early development for Disney+ from Marvel Studios, with Schaeffer returning as head writer and executive producer.

During a Disney+ Day event in November 2021, the series was officially announced, with Schaeffer revealed to be directing episodes of the series a year later. By October 2023, Marvel Studios was changing its approach to television, hiring more traditional showrunners instead of head writers. Schaeffer was being credited as the series' showrunner by July 2024. Marvel Studios' Feige, Louis D'Esposito, Winderbaum and Mary Livanos served as executive producers. Released under Marvel Studios' Marvel Television label, Agatha All Along was later announced to be second in a trilogy of series that includes WandaVision and VisionQuest (2026).

=== Writing ===
Schaeffer revealed that the idea of Teen being Billy Maximoff originated from executive producer Mary Livanos. It stemmed from the writers' desire to introduce a "goth teen" character to emphasize Agatha Harkness' role as a mentor. When referencing the comic books material for Maximoff's origin story, the writers retained the character's Jewish heritage and his authentically supportive family—a contrast to Wanda Maximoff / Scarlet Witch's performative portrayal of domestic life. Writer Peter Cameron first suggested the idea of the car accident as an entry point into Maximoff's reincarnation.

When discussing Evan Peters' appearance as Ralph Bohner, Schaeffer explained the character, along with other Westview, New Jersey residents, was meant to embody "the regular human experience" of supernatural conflicts. When conceptualizing the interrogation scene between Maximoff and Harkness in her Agnes persona, Schaeffer explained that the writers aimed to highlight Maximoff's perspective while comedically revealing the true nature of events from episode one, "Seekest Thou the Road".

=== Casting ===
The episode stars Kathryn Hahn as Agatha Harkness, Joe Locke as Billy Maximoff and William Kaplan, Sasheer Zamata as Jennifer Kale, Ali Ahn as Alice Wu-Gulliver, Debra Jo Rupp as Sharon Davis and Patti LuPone as Lilia Calderu. Additionally, Evan Peters reprises his WandaVision role of Ralph Bohner. Maria Dizzia and Paul Adelstein portray Rebecca and Jeff Kaplan, respectively, while Miles Gutierrez-Riley appears as Eddie.

Schaeffer expressed excitement about Peters reprising his role from WandaVision, calling his return "a prerequisite" in her decision to develop the follow-up series.

=== Filming ===
Locke treated William Kaplan and Billy Maximoff as two individual characters in his performance, highlighting their differences. While scenes featuring Kaplan and Maximoff were filmed out of order, the episode—like the rest of the series—was largely shot as a whole to accommodate the different directors. Locke provided feedback for set dressers with regards to posters in Maximoff's room, replacing an outdated reference with the "Trans Lives Matter" flag.

Hahn and Locke improvised parts of their interrogation scene, including the pen-clicking gesture and Harkness' challenge to Maximoff to "poke the bear". The scene between Maximoff and Harkness on the Witches' Road included material from the actors' first chemistry read, being the first scene Locke filmed for the series.

=== Music ===
In September 2024, Michael Paraskevas was revealed to have composed the series' score with Christophe Beck. It was released digitally by Marvel Music and Hollywood Records in two volumes: music from the first five episodes was released on October 11, 2024, and the music from the last four episodes was released on November 1, 2024. A soundtrack album was released on vinyl featuring all versions of "The Ballad of the Witches' Road", as well as selected tracks from the score, on October 30, 2024.

== Reception ==
=== Viewership ===
Nielsen Media Research, which records streaming viewership on U.S. television screens, estimated that the series was viewed for 410 million minutes for the episode's premiere week. JustWatch, a guide to streaming content with access to data from more than 40 million users around the world, reported it as the eighth most-streamed series in the U.S. for the week ending October 20.

=== Critical response ===
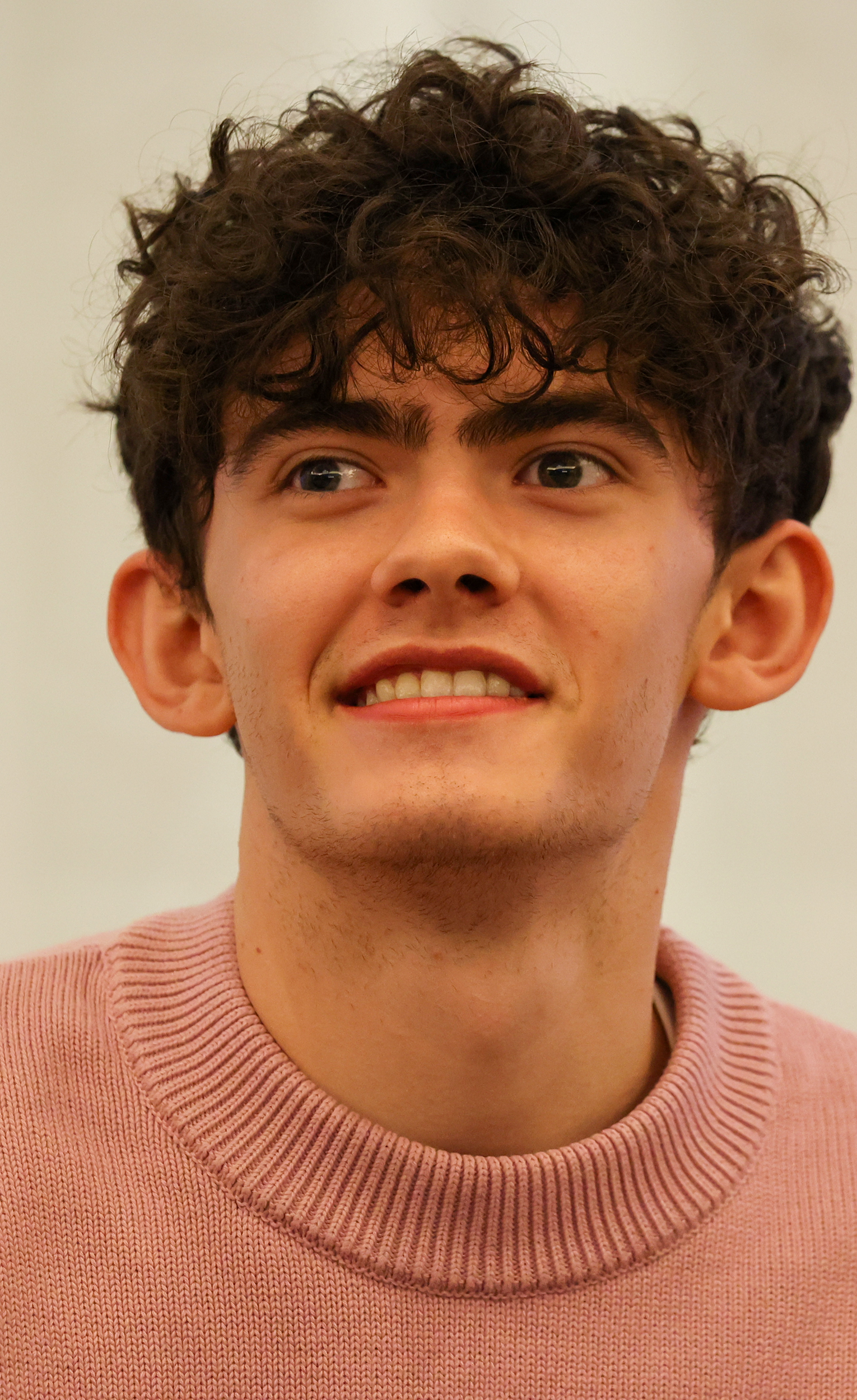
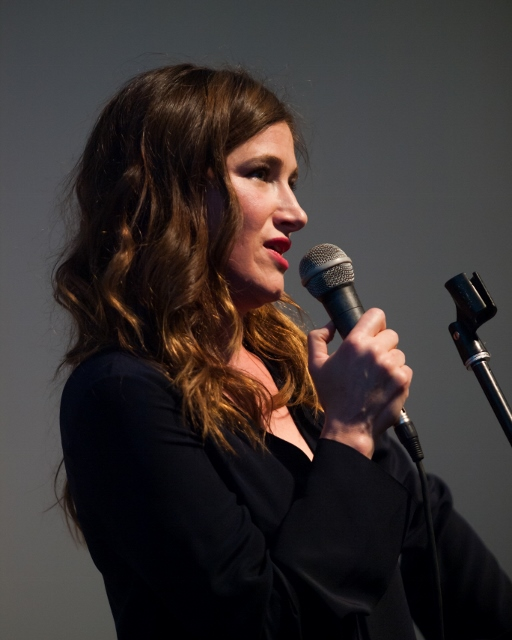
Joe Locke (left) and Kathryn Hahn (right) received critical praise for their performances as Billy Maximoff / William Kaplan and Agatha Harkness / Agnes O'Connor in "Familiar by Thy Side."

The review aggregator website Rotten Tomatoes reported a 92% approval rating based on twelve reviews. The site's critical consensus reads, "Familiar By Thy Side unwinds slowly and surely thanks to Joe Locke's central performance."

CBR critic Joshua Patton rated the episode 7/10, praising Locke and Hahn's comedic scenes and finding it "hilarious to see their dynamic from a sillier and more self-aware angle". Patton highlighted the scene featuring Ralph Bohner as "a grim reminder of the high price of Wanda's tragic but still selfish escapism". Patton worried the episode did not provide a satisfying conclusion to the series' second act, writing: "While it does technically resolve the [episode 5] cliffhanger, the episode does highlight the problem with the "cards down" approach to storytelling". Collider's Taylor Gates also awarded the episode a 7/10 rating. Gates lauded Locke and Hahn's chemistry, stating that the two "continue to be excellent scene partners, equally engaging in their dramatic and comedic moments", but expressed mixed feelings on the episode's pacing, calling it "a double-edged sword" to develop Billy Maximoff's backstory while not offering a similar look into other members of Agatha Harkness' coven.

Caroline Framke of Vulture praised director Gandja Monteiro's approach, which "immediately achieves the balancing act of keeping "Familiar by Thy Side" close enough to the show's witchy world while rooting it in the very human story at the heart of Billy's." Writing for Tell-Tale TV, Mufsin Mahbub credited Locke's performance for "helping us connect to him as his character goes through some big changes" and found the episode's ability to "establish connections, showing how each coven member has interacted with William previously" to be "fascinating". Joshua Yehl of IGN felt the episode offered payoff on the series' ongoing mysteries, calling it "a well-executed character study that brought together many of the show's story threads in a cool way". Yehl also opined Ralph Bohner's re-appearance "redeemed" the character's role from WandaVision, writing: "The whole sequence was entertaining for how he bounced back and forth between comedy and despair". Yehl was critical of the episode for providing an easy escape for Agatha from the mud trap as it "reduced the sense of danger on the road".

In a negative review, Jen Lennon of The A.V. Club criticized the episode for "not using its time effectively", expressing concern that the narrative "falls into the same disappointing pattern as WandaVision" due to its over-reliance on expository scenes. Lennon described the episode as "both a momentum-halting detour into William's background and a "Woah, the seemingly disparate characters are actually all connected, how about that!" reveal". Lennon opined the episode did not provide enough emotional insight into Billy Maximoff's character, and concluded: "I'd believe Billy a hell of a lot more if "Familiar By Thy Side" actually dug into his emotions instead of simply explaining what happened to him and relying on unnecessary cameos to pad the episode's too-long runtime".
