= Through Many Miles / Of Tricks and Trials =

- Agatha All Along episode
- Promotional poster for Agatha All Along, highlighting elements seen in this episode and parodying the poster for the film The Rocky Horror Picture Show
- Episode no.: Episode 3
- Directed by: Rachel Goldberg
- Written by: Cameron Squires
- Cinematography by: Caleb Heymann
- Editing by: Libby Cuenin
- Original release date: September 25, 2024
- Running time: 39 minutes

Cast
- Elizabeth Anweis as Lorna Wu; Chloe Camp as young Lilia; Laura Boccaletti as Lilia's maestra; Scott Butler as the Doctor

Episode chronology
← Previous "Circle Sewn with Fate / Unlock Thy Hidden Gate"	Next → "If I Can't Reach You / Let My Song Teach You"

"Through Many Miles / Of Tricks and Trials" is the third episode of the American television miniseries Agatha All Along, based on Marvel Comics featuring the character Agatha Harkness. It follows Harkness, who has been stripped of her identity after the events of the miniseries WandaVision (2021), and her coven as they continue their journey down the Witches' Road in search of power. The episode is set in the Marvel Cinematic Universe (MCU), sharing continuity with the films of the franchise. It was written by Cameron Squires and directed by Rachel Goldberg.

The episode explores the coven's first trial on the Witches' Road, where poisoned wine forces the group to rely on Jennifer Kale's (Sasheer Zamata) potion expertise and teamwork to create an antidote, all while facing unsettling visions of their pasts. Apart from Zamata, Kathryn Hahn reprises her role as Harkness from the WandaVision miniseries, with Joe Locke, Ali Ahn, Debra Jo Rupp and Patti LuPone also starring. Filming took place in the Atlanta metropolitan area and in Los Angeles.

"Through Many Miles / Of Tricks and Trials" was released on the streaming service Disney+ on September 25, 2024. The episode garnered favorable reviews from critics, with praise for its humor, ensemble cast, and the hints at each character's backstory, though some felt the trial's events lacked momentum.

== Plot ==
On the Witches' Road, Sharon Davis accuses the coven of kidnapping her. When Teen introduces himself to the group, they recognize the spell concealing his identity as a sigil. Agatha Harkness informs them that their expertise in different areas of witchcraft will be tested through individual trials. Davis strays from the Road and nearly falls victim to a mud pool before the coven rescues her.

Shortly thereafter, the group discovers a coastal house with a "middle-aged, second chance at love" style, and upon entering their outfits are transformed to match the aesthetic. A riddle is presented to them which Davis solves by spotting a bottle of wine everyone except Teen shares, setting off a countdown timer. Jennifer Kale privately cautions Teen about Harkness, who is rumored to have given up her child for the Darkhold. While Teen and Alice Wu-Gulliver exchange stories about their pasts, Harkness secretly disposes of her wine without taking a sip.

After a few minutes, the coven's faces briefly swell, prompting Kale to realize that the wine has been poisoned and identify the toxin. With her glass magically refilled, Harkness is left with no choice but to drink, as Teen threatens to drink the contents on her behalf. Under the poison's influence, Davis hallucinates her trauma experienced under Wanda Maximoff's spell (Note: As depicted in the WandaVision episode "Filmed Before a Live Studio Audience" (2021).) before fainting.

Kale urges the group to gather the ingredients necessary for an antidote and the coven teams up into pairs to search the house. During the search, the witches face vivid visions of their pasts—Jennifer relives her magic being bound, Lilia Calderu is confronted by her younger self and a shadowy figure looming over her old maestra, and Wu-Gulliver witnesses her mother Lorna Wu's impending death. While they manage to secure the ingredients, they discover the house is submerged, with water leaking in through cracks in the window caused by Harkness' earlier attempt to flee.

The group moves the unconscious Davis into the kitchen where they brew the antidote under Kale's instructions. Harkness hallucinates a crib containing the Darkhold. Encouraged by Harkness, Kale manages to finish the antidote just before the time runs out. Everyone drinks the antidote and helps administer a dose to Davis. The trial ends and they escape through a tunnel in the kitchen oven just as the house is being flooded.

The coven finds themselves back on the Road. As Calderu urges Harkness and Kale to stop arguing, the group realize that Davis is dead.

== Production ==
=== Development ===
In May 2021, Jac Schaeffer, the head writer of WandaVision, signed a three-year overall television deal with Marvel Studios and 20th Television to create new projects for their Disney+ lineup. In pitches for several different projects focused on various characters, Schaeffer consistently suggested including WandaVision character Agatha Harkness, a powerful witch from Marvel Comics, as part of those series. This led to her and Marvel Studios president Kevin Feige pursuing a series centered on that character instead. By October 2021, a "dark comedy" spin-off from WandaVision centered on Kathryn Hahn as Agatha was in early development for Disney+ from Marvel Studios, with Schaeffer returning as head writer and executive producer.

During a Disney+ Day event in November 2021, the series was officially announced, with Schaeffer revealed to be directing episodes of the series a year later. By October 2023, Marvel Studios was changing its approach to television, hiring more traditional showrunners instead of head writers. Schaeffer was being credited as the series' showrunner by July 2024. Marvel Studios' Feige, Louis D'Esposito, Winderbaum, and Mary Livanos served as executive producers. Released under Marvel Studios' Marvel Television label, Agatha All Along was later announced to be second in a trilogy of series that includes WandaVision and VisionQuest (2026).

=== Writing ===
Schaeffer always envisioned a "hyper-feminized space" for one of the trials to contrast with Agatha Harkness' personality, with an early concept for the trial being a baby shower. The subdued theme of the trial, inspired by Nancy Meyers' and Nora Ephron's work, was also developed as a counterpoint to the rumors surrounding the horrors of the Witches' Road, providing space for the show to escalate the threat in the following trials. Episode writer Cameron Squires was responsible for selecting and incorporating a key piece of backstory for each character through the hallucinations, setting the stage for future character development. Extensive conversations took place between Schaeffer and executive producers Mary Livanos, Brad Winderbaum and Kevin Feige regarding the series' mood and consequences. Sharon Davis's death was intended to establish the high stakes and emphasize the perilous nature of the Witches' Road. Referencing Mephisto was a deliberate choice by Schaeffer and Livanos as a nod to the widespread Internet speculation surrounding the character during WandaVision's initial release. Early on the show's production, the team had an early document that included Mephisto as a potential antagonist, but Schaeffer didn't recall ever really taking the possibility seriously, feeling that the idea logistically didn't feel right for the show aside that the character never really interested her, though she admitted she didn't intend to toy anyone with Mephisto's reference and that maybe she was underestimation the expectations the audience had for the character showing up in the MCU.

=== Casting ===
The episode stars Kathryn Hahn as Agatha Harkness, Joe Locke as Teen, Sasheer Zamata as Jennifer Kale, Ali Ahn as Alice Wu-Gulliver, Patti LuPone as Lilia Calderu and Debra Jo Rupp as Sharon Davis. It features Elizabeth Anweis as Lorna Wu, Chloe Camp as Young Lilia, Laura Boccaletti as Calderu's Maestra and Scott Butler as The Doctor.

=== Filming ===
With the environment sets built practically, a detailed blueprint of the trial house was drawn, and a miniature model was constructed from it over three weeks. To create the illusion of perspective as the coven approaches the house, the model was placed 60 feet away from the actors, with a midground set piece of grass and fencing funneling the shot. The shift in lighting from night to sunset was achieved practically through the use of flare effects. The face swelling effect on each member of the coven was achieved using prosthetic makeup, which required four hours to apply per actor. To film the flood sequence, two 4,000 gallon and two 3,000 gallon water tanks were emptied onto the set. Director Rachel Goldberg informed the cast that the initial take was a test but had the water released fully to capture their unfiltered responses.

=== Music ===
In September 2024, Michael Paraskevas was revealed to have composed the series' score with Christophe Beck. It was released digitally by Marvel Music and Hollywood Records in two volumes: music from the first five episodes was released on October 11, 2024, and the music from the last four episodes was released on November 1, 2024. A soundtrack album was released on vinyl featuring all versions of "The Ballad of the Witches' Road", as well as selected tracks from the score, on October 30, 2024. The episode's end credits feature the song "Heads Will Roll" by Yeah Yeah Yeahs.

== Reception ==
=== Viewership ===
Nielsen Media Research, which records streaming viewership on U.S. television screens, estimated that the first three episodes of Agatha All Along garnered 365 million minutes of viewing time for the premiere week of "Through Many Miles / Of Tricks and Trials". JustWatch, a guide to streaming content with access to data from more than 40 million users around the world, listed Agatha All Along as the fifth most-streamed series in the U.S. for the week of the episode's release. Whip Media, which tracks viewership data for more than 25 million worldwide users of its TV Time app, revealed that it was the second most-streamed original series in the U.S. from September 22 to October 6, encompassing the week of the episode's release.

=== Critical response ===
The review aggregator website Rotten Tomatoes reported an 100% approval rating based on twelve reviews. The site's critical consensus reads, "Agatha All Along continues to cast its spell in this entertaining yet slightly scary foray into The Witches Road, Through Many Miles; Of Tricks and Trials."

Grading the episode 9/10, Sunshine State Cineplex critic Alan French described the episode as "one of the best episodes for us to watch character growth." He noted that "everyone gets a moment of fun and excitement" and called Rupp's performance "excellent." French labeled the episode "creative" for "using homage to its benefit" by referencing Nancy Meyers's body of work, writing: "Anytime you can allow your show to have the "middle-aged divorcee, second shot at life" aesthetic, you've got to go for it. The theme applies wonderfully to this group of characters. Each woman is looking for their next opportunity to change their fate." French appreciated the story for planting "integral storytelling elements around Agatha" and concluded by praising the episode's horror elements, remarking: "Agatha All Along gets scarier as well, which is a huge win." In an 8/10 review, Collider's Taylor Gates described the episode as a strong setup for a "very interesting" storyline in the coming weeks. Gates further commended showrunner Jac Schaeffer's ability to sprinkle "some delicious breadcrumbs [...] to nibble on and ponder in terms of each character's backstory via the flashbacks." Gates highlighted the "intriguing" dynamic between Agatha and Teen and expressed enthusiasm for the episode's "magical escape room" structure.

Joshua M. Patton of CBR awarded the episode a score of 7/10 and wrote, "Episode 3 sets up the dynamic of the coven while being authentic to its individual members." He felt that "the witches' challenge wasn't as interesting as the way in which the coven approached it" and expressed interest in the magical lore outlined in the episode, opining that "the MCU's magic underworld is much bigger, more complex and more lived-in than fans expected." While calling Sharon Davis' death "shocking", Patton felt the episode ended on a narratively "promising note, [...] so long as future episodes balance the magical test with interesting character evolution and visuals." Tell-Tale TV's Mufsin Mahbub commented positively on the characters' backstories, stating, "There's quite a lot to unpack during this episode, but this may be a tease of some of the horrors that will come in the show, and we are here for it." She was impressed with the production design, writing: "Props to the costume design and production team for the amazing set design and outfits that look like something out of The Wizard of Oz with a touch of Tim Burton." Mahbub lauded Rupp's "impeccable comedic timing" and opined that Hahn "continues to excel" as a "nefariously selfish" Agatha Harkness. While she felt that "not everyone gets enough screen time", Mahbub called the episode "one of the most engaging installments so far" as it was "enjoyable to see this cast getting into the thick of it through these trials as a group."

Jen Lennon of The A.V. Club rated the episode "B−", calling the practical sets a "visual delight" and describing the Witches' Road set design as "perfectly spooky and foreboding" and "worthy of being the series' main visual metaphor." According to Lennon, the genre references within the trial fell short, representing a missed chance for insightful social commentary. She wrote: "Like in WandaVision, the homages are fun but they're also shallow. Rather than integrating the setting into the story, it just lays on top like an Instagram filter." Lennon was critical of the trial's culmination, feeling that Jennifer Kale's story remained "frustratingly opaque" and, as a consequence, it didn't "feel earned when Jen gets the potion right." In a 3/5 review, Caroline Framke of Vulture was similarly critical of the lack of character depth for Jen, which she attributed to the episode's short runtime, remarking that the plot "has been moving at such a brisk pace that it feels a little like these 35-minutes [...] were supposed to run 45." Framke found the trial setting to be lackluster, writing: "I can't help but think that this trial might've been more compelling in a Practical Magic house stuffed to the brim with possibilities rather than a Big Little Lies mansion largely empty of mess or ephemera, aside from exactly the ingredients they need." Framke was more positive of the characters' backstories as she described the hallucinations as "effectively unsettling in leaving new breadcrumbs of foreshadowing" and lauded the high stakes established by Sharon Davis' death.
