= Seekest Thou the Road =

- Agatha All Along episode
- Promotional poster for Agatha All Along, highlighting elements seen in this episode
- Episode no.: Episode 1
- Directed by: Jac Schaeffer
- Written by: Jac Schaeffer
- Cinematography by: Caleb Heymann
- Editing by: Jamie Gross
- Original release date: September 18, 2024
- Running time: 42 minutes

Cast
- Emma Caulfield Ford as Dottie; David A Payton as Herb; David Lengel as Jones; Asif Ali as Norm; Amos Glick as Dennis the Mailman

Episode chronology
← Previous —	Next → "Circle Sewn with Fate / Unlock Thy Hidden Gate"

"Seekest Thou the Road" is the first episode of the American television miniseries Agatha All Along, based on Marvel Comics featuring the character Agatha Harkness. The episode is set in the Marvel Cinematic Universe (MCU), sharing continuity with the films of the franchise. It was written and directed by showrunner Jac Schaeffer.

The episode follows Harkness (Kathryn Hahn) as she regains her identity after the events of WandaVision (2021), crosses paths with a mysterious Teen (Joe Locke), and confronts an old enemy. Apart from Hahn and Locke, Debra Jo Rupp and Aubrey Plaza also star in the episode. Filming took place in the Atlanta metropolitan area and in Los Angeles.

"Seekest Thou the Road" was released on the streaming service Disney+ on September 18, 2024, alongside "Circle Sewn with Fate / Unlock Thy Hidden Gate" as a two-part premiere. The episode garnered favorable reviews, with critics praising Hahn and Plaza's performances as well as the WandaVision Easter eggs, although some criticism was aimed at the pacing. Disney reported that the episode drove 9.3 million views globally within the first seven days of streaming.

== Plot ==
Detective Agnes O'Connor arrives at a crime scene outside of Westview, New Jersey, where she begins investigating the murder of a Jane Doe. While searching the nearby area for evidence, O'Connor discovers a mysterious locket, and later deduces the murder occurred elsewhere. O'Connor visits the town library to investigate a card found on the victim, and learns the documented book was stolen three years ago. A fire scorched the library shelf where the book once sat, destroying every copy. At the police station, O'Connor reluctantly joins forces with FBI agent Rio Vidal—an old acquaintance—to solve the case. Later, O'Connor realizes the initials of the book's title spell "Darkhold".

Vidal visits O'Connor at her home, where they discuss the case. O'Connor admits she does not recall what caused the animosity between them. They are interrupted when a teenage burglar intrudes in O'Connor's house. O'Connor apprehends, unmasks and interrogates the teen in connection to the murder investigation. As the boy chants in Latin, O'Connor realizes the pictures of the victim are photographs of flowers, and the one-way mirror is a painting. O'Connor visits the morgue to examine the victim, who is identified as Wanda Maximoff. (Note: Wanda's death is portrayed in Doctor Strange in the Multiverse of Madness (2022).) With Vidal's encouragement, O'Connor sheds the layers of Maximoff's spell. Her assumed identity falls away, and her true persona—Agatha Harkness—emerges.

Bereft of her magic, Harkness finds herself inside her Westview home. After learning from local resident Herb that she has been trapped under Maximoff's spell for three years (Note: As depicted in the WandaVision episode "The Series Finale" (2021).) and her life as a detective has been an illusion, Harkness descends into her basement to find it stripped of magical equipment. She stumbles upon the teen, restrained in a closet, and realizes she kidnapped him under the influence of Maximoff's spell. Vidal, revealed to be a witch, arrives and attacks Harkness. As the fight escalates, Harkness requests that Vidal give her time to regain her powers for a fair match. Vidal relents, but promises to disclose Harkness' whereabouts to the Salem Seven before departing. Harkness is left unsure of what to do with the teen, who remains apprehended in her closet.

== Production ==
=== Development ===
In May 2021, Jac Schaeffer, the head writer of WandaVision, signed a three-year overall television deal with Marvel Studios and 20th Television to create new projects for their Disney+ lineup. In pitches for several different projects focused on various characters, Schaeffer consistently suggested including WandaVision character Agatha Harkness, a powerful witch from Marvel Comics, as part of those series. This led to her and Marvel Studios president Kevin Feige pursuing a series centered on that character instead. By October 2021, a "dark comedy" spin-off from WandaVision centered on Kathryn Hahn as Agatha was in early development for Disney+ from Marvel Studios, with Schaeffer returning as head writer and executive producer.

During a Disney+ Day event in November 2021, the series was officially announced, with Schaeffer revealed to be directing episodes of the series a year later. By October 2023, Marvel Studios was changing its approach to television, hiring more traditional showrunners instead of head writers. Schaeffer was being credited as the series' showrunner by July 2024. Marvel Studios' Feige, Louis D'Esposito, Winderbaum and Mary Livanos served as executive producers. Released under Marvel Studios' Marvel Television label, Agatha All Along was later announced to be second in a trilogy of series that includes WandaVision and VisionQuest (2026).

=== Writing ===
Originally conceived as a potential setting for an episode of WandaVision, the true crime drama concept was revisited by Jac Schaeffer during the early development of Agatha All Along. Schaeffer felt the genre aligned well with Agatha Harkness's "gritty" mindset and her capacity to recognize darkness in both herself and others. Schaeffer noted that the familiar trope of "a woman who's smart and great at her job and [...] messy in her personal life" felt fitting for Harkness' character. She described writing the episode as both a homage to WandaVision and a fully realized tribute to the true crime genre. Schaeffer cited Mare of Easttown (2021), The Killing (2011-2013), and Destroyer (2018) as tonal inspirations, and mentioned the amusing coincidence of Evan Peters appearing in both WandaVision and Mare of Easttown. She also explained that the episode needed to resolve its genre subversions more quickly than WandaVision, in order to avoid repetition and maintain viewer engagement.

=== Casting ===
The episode stars Kathryn Hahn as Agatha Harkness, Joe Locke as Teen, Debra Jo Rupp as Sharon Davis and Aubrey Plaza as Rio Vidal. Several actors reprise their WandaVision roles as Westview residents, including Emma Caulfield as Sarah Proctor / "Dottie Jones", David Payton as John Collins / "Herb Feltman", David Lengel as Sarah's husband Harold Proctor / "Phil Jones", Asif Ali as Abilash Tandon / "Norm Gentilucci" and Amos Glick as a pizza delivery man / "Dennis the Mailman".

=== Filming ===
I was directing [...], and I had to do so little. Aubrey signed up because she wanted to work with Kathryn. Both of them were so raring to go.

— Agatha All Along showrunner Jac Schaeffer's on Kathryn Hahn and Aubrey Plaza's on-screen chemistry in the episode.

Filming took place on Blondie Street at the Warner Bros. Ranch for Agatha's house and other Westview exteriors prior to the street being demolished.

Schaeffer expressed enthusiasm for the opportunity to direct again, marking the episode as her first directing credit since her debut film Timer (2009). She highlighted her decision to direct the first two episodes as a way to lay the groundwork for the plot, calling "Seekest Thou the Road" a "misdirect" pilot and noting that the real story begins with "Circle Sewn with Fate / Unlock Thy Hidden Gate".

While directing Hahn and Plaza in their shared scenes, Schaeffer provided Plaza with instructions that Hahn could not hear to emphasize the "coded" nature of their interactions, particularly in the "Agnes of Westview" segment of the episode. Schaeffer and editor Jamie Gross also made sure to use takes where the actors conveyed romantic and emotional subtext, such as Plaza's "inhale, and resting for a pause" during Agatha Harkness and Rio Vidal's first exchange at the station.

The episode marks the first instance of female nudity in the Marvel Cinematic Universe (MCU). Initially scripted with Agatha Harkness grabbing a robe after emerging from Wanda Maximoff's spell, Schaeffer revised the scene based on Hahn's input. Hahn believed her character had no inhibitions, and the nudity would reflect Harkness' emotional vulnerability and sense of powerlessness. Pushing the boundaries of Disney+ content, the scene involved legal coordination between the production team and the streaming service.

The sequence of Agatha Harkness breaking free from Maximoff's spell raised production concerns due to the numerous costume changes and their feasibility within the constraints of a single-day shoot. Initially planned as a CGI sequence, the scene shifted to real outfit changes after the decision was made to prioritize practical effects for the series. Costume designer Daniel Selon explained that the shoot was rehearsed similarly to theater costume changes. The outfit transformations were filmed non-chronologically to maximize efficiency, requiring close coordination between Schaeffer, Hahn, and the hair, makeup, and wardrobe departments. Schaeffer also choreographed Hahn's movements to ensure that parts of the underlying costumes remained hidden from the camera during filming.

=== Music ===
In September 2024, Michael Paraskevas was revealed to have composed the series' score with Christophe Beck. It was released digitally by Marvel Music and Hollywood Records in two volumes: music from the first five episodes was released on October 11, 2024, and the music from the last four episodes was released on November 1, 2024. A soundtrack album was released on vinyl featuring all versions of "The Ballad of the Witches' Road", as well as selected tracks from the score, on October 30, 2024. The episode's end credits feature the song "Season of the Witch" by Donovan.

For its fake opening credits sequence, the episode features "The Ballad of the Witches' Road (True Crime Version)" performed by Matthew Mayfield, marking the first of several versions of the song to appear throughout the series. From the outset, Schaeffer's vision for the series included a song by Robert Lopez and Kristen Anderson-Lopez as a successor to the cultural impact of "Agatha All Along". Serving as both a narrative device and a thematic anchor, the "Ballad of the Witches' Road" incorporates lore and hidden clues in its lyrics, a result of close collaboration between the Lopezes and the writing team.

== Reception ==
=== Viewership ===
Disney announced that "Seekest Thou the Road" attracted 9.3 million views globally within its first seven days of streaming. The two-episode premiere also garnered over 9.8 million viewers during its premiere week. It became the No. 1 television show on Disney+ during that period. Nielsen Media Research, which records streaming viewership on U.S. television screens, estimated that the series was viewed for 426 million minutes from September 16–22. JustWatch, a guide to streaming content with access to data from more than 40 million users around the world, reported it as the third most-streamed series in the U.S. from September 16–22.

=== Critical response ===
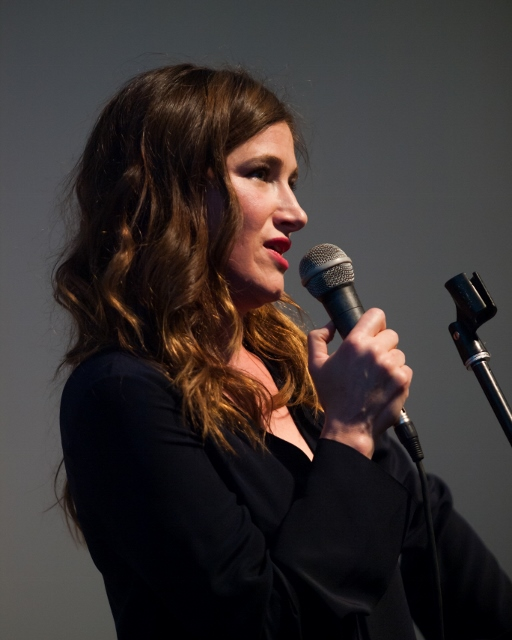
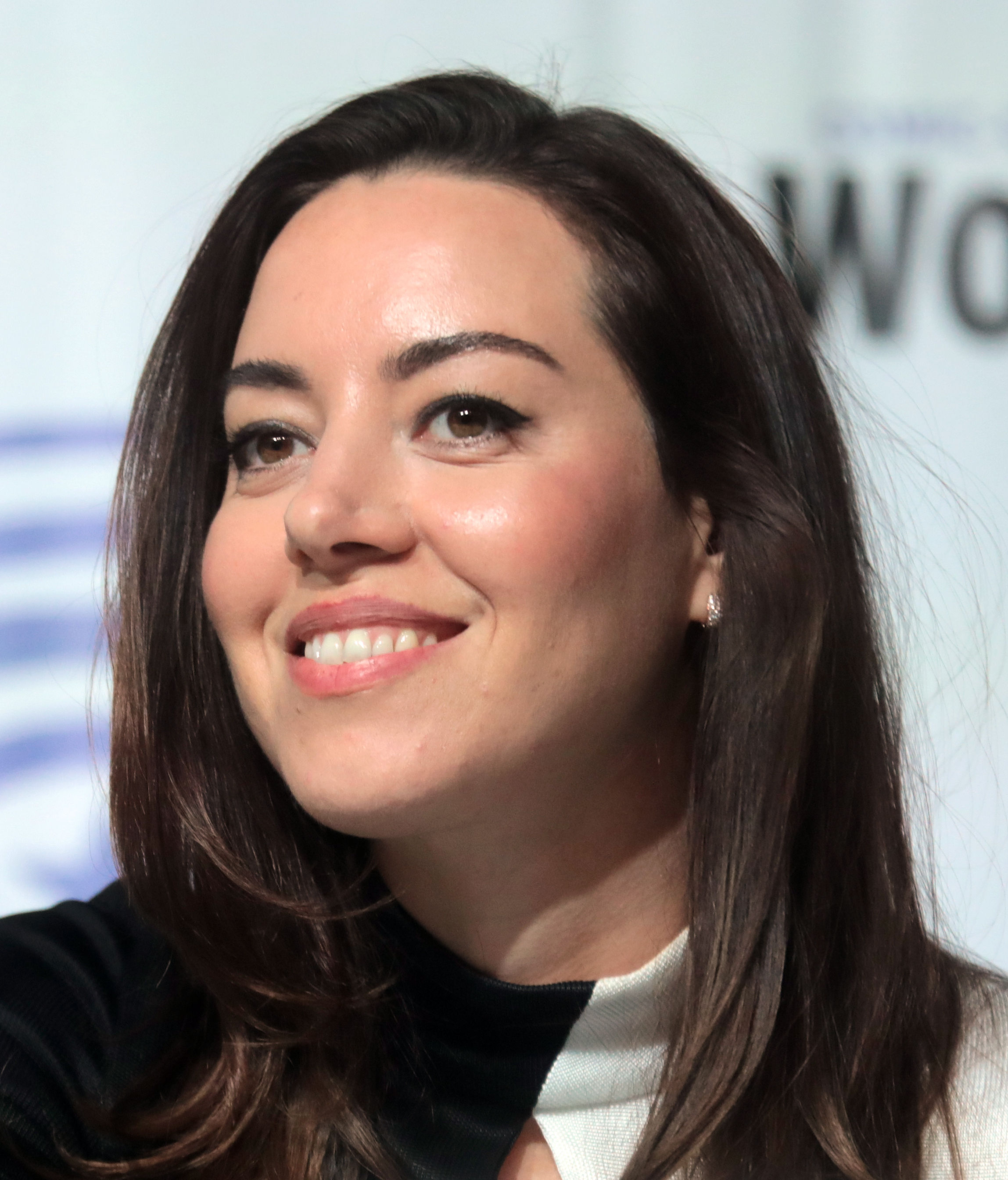
Kathryn Hahn (left) and Aubrey Plaza (right) received critical praise for their performances as Agatha Harkness / Agnes O'Connor and Rio Vidal in "Seekest Thou the Road."

The review aggregator website Rotten Tomatoes reported an 82% approval rating based on eleven reviews. The site's critical consensus reads, "Spearheaded by the fantastically versatile and wickedly good Kathryn Hahn, Seekest Though the Road spooks and spoofs its way into an intriguingly new, marvelous adventure."

Lyra Hale of Fangirlish gave the episode an A+ grade, stating, "Agatha All Along season 1 episode 1 was a slow burn that left me wanting more of Agatha and Rio just staring into each other's eyes, having full conversations about death, passion, anger, and so much more." Writing for Sunshine State Cineplex, Alan French called the episode "a solid start", and credited its impact to "Hahn's stellar performance", which he described as "an excellent parody of the genre that speaks to her talents as a performer." In a 7/10 review, Collider's Taylor Gates felt the episode was "more like a prologue than a pilot", and opined, "Watching Hahn ham it up will never not be a blast, and the writing remains clever with all the Easter eggs scattered throughout. [...] But as fun as it is, it also feels a little unnecessary — at least at the moment."

Joshua Patton of CBR also awarded the episode a score of 7/10, calling it "wilder" than WandaVision, and writing: "It's an intriguing premise for a TV series, and clever of Jac Schaeffer, who also created WandaVision, to kick off with elements of that earlier show." Writing for Tell-Tale TV, Mufsin Mahbub praised Hahn and Plaza's performances, stating: "The first episode does well in showcasing Hahn's ability to play this role and why audiences have been captivated by her mischievous character. [...] Plaza does a marvelous job in her role as she is on equal footing with Hahn when they share screen time." In a 4/5 review, Caroline Framke of Vulture found the episode enjoyable and "trippy", but felt it did not set up a clear narrative for the remainder of the series, concluding: "I'm going to call this premiere successfully intriguing while also holding out a bit longer to see what Agatha's actually all about." But Why Tho? critic Allyson Johnson gave the episode a 7/10 rating, labelling it "a decently entertaining vehicle for Kathryn Hahn to show off her versatility" that "suffer[ed] from pacing issues." Johnson thought the narrative to be "a bit of a slog" that "only picks up once Plaza arrives, and the story pivots out of the fake reality."

Jeffrey Lyles of Lyles Movie Files criticized the episode's tone for being "a little too serious and deliberate without much fun" and felt that while "Hahn is a tremendously versatile performer who can pull off this cop drama cliché", the true crime spoof was "a very questionable way to start off the series."

=== Accolades ===
Agatha Harkness and Rio Vidal's fight scene was featured on TV Line's "20 Sexiest Scenes" of the year list.

Accolades received by Agatha All Along
Award	Date of ceremony	Category	Recipient	Result	Ref.
Costume Designers Guild Awards	February 6, 2025	Excellence in Contemporary Television	Daniel Selon	Nominated	
