= Circle Sewn with Fate / Unlock Thy Hidden Gate =

- Agatha All Along episode
- Promotional poster for Agatha All Along, highlighting elements seen in this episode
- Episode no.: Episode 2
- Directed by: Jac Schaeffer
- Written by: Laura Donney
- Cinematography by: Caleb Heymann
- Editing by: David Egan
- Original release date: September 18, 2024
- Running time: 44 minutes

Cast
- David A Payton as Herb; Okwui Okpokwasili as Vertigo

Episode chronology
← Previous "Seekest Thou the Road"	Next → "Through Many Miles / Of Tricks and Trials"

"Circle Sewn with Fate / Unlock Thy Hidden Gate" is the second episode of the American television miniseries Agatha All Along, based on Marvel Comics featuring the character Agatha Harkness. It follows Harkness, who has been stripped of her identity after the events of the miniseries WandaVision (2021), and her coven as they begin their journey down the Witches' Road. The episode is set in the Marvel Cinematic Universe (MCU), sharing continuity with the films of the franchise. It was written by Laura Donney and directed by showrunner Jac Schaeffer.

The episode follows Harkness (Kathryn Hahn) and Teen (Joe Locke) as they assemble a coven to take down the Witches' Road. Together, the coven performs "The Ballad of the Witches' Road" to open a portal to the Road and evade the Salem Seven. Apart from Hahn and Locke, Sasheer Zamata, Ali Ahn, Patti LuPone and Debra Jo Rupp also star in the episode. Filming took place in the Atlanta metropolitan area and in Los Angeles.

"Circle Sewn with Fate / Unlock Thy Hidden Gate" was released on the streaming service Disney+ on September 18, 2024, alongside "Seekest Thou the Road" as a two-part premiere. The episode received positive reviews from critics, with praise for the introduction of new pivotal characters, and the cast's performances. In 2025, "The Ballad of the Witches' Road" was nominated for an Outstanding Original Music and Lyrics at the Primetime Emmy Awards.

== Plot ==
Agatha Harkness prepares to leave Westview when Teen asks her to take him on the Witches' Road—a series of trials that rewards witches with the thing they are missing. Initially reluctant, Harkness relents after Teen admits to undoing the Scarlet Witch's spell and unknowingly displays a spell that prevents him from revealing his name. Harkness informs Teen they will need to form a coven to access the Road, and the pair leave Westview in search of nearby witches to recruit.

Divination witch Lilia Calderu is apprehensive of Harkness' reputation as a witch killer, but Harkness discloses that she can only absorb power from witches who initiate an attack against her. A vision prompts Calderu to make a list of witches who are fated to be part of the coven, and Harkness points out that the former's name is included. Harkness and Teen then attempt to recruit Jennifer "Jen" Kale as a potions witch. Kale is revealed to be magically bound and unable to access her powers. Teen brings up a lawsuit related to her skincare products, and the duo offer her a chance to escape a lifetime sentence by joining them on the Road. In a shopping mall, Harkness and Teen seek out Alice Wu-Gulliver—a protection witch and daughter of a rock singer who performed the most famous version of "The Ballad of the Witches' Road". Wu-Gulliver rejects Harkness' proposal, insisting that the Road is a fictional creation of her late mother's fans.

On their drive back to Westview, Harkness finds herself unable to hear any of the personal details that Teen shares about his life due to the spell cast over him. The coven assembles in Harkness' home, with Wu-Gulliver unexpectedly joining them. The group presses for the recruitment of a green witch, as Calderu points out that her note listed an unnamed fifth member indicated by a black heart. Harkness enlists local resident Sharon Davis, an avid gardener who was previously known as "Mrs. Hart" under the Scarlet Witch's spell. While the five women chant "The Ballad of the Witches' Road" in Harkness' basement to conjure the entrance to the Road, the Salem Seven attack the house. When the witches fail to summon the Road, Harkness taunts them, but Calderu halts their retaliation, preventing them from providing Harkness with power to absorb. A door suddenly appears, and the coven, including Teen, enters it to escape the Salem Seven.

Now on the Witches' Road, the group removes their shoes, pausing to take in their surroundings before beginning their journey.

== Production ==
=== Development ===
In May 2021, Jac Schaeffer, the head writer of WandaVision, signed a three-year overall television deal with Marvel Studios and 20th Television to create new projects for their Disney+ lineup. In pitches for several different projects focused on various characters, Schaeffer consistently suggested including WandaVision character Agatha Harkness, a powerful witch from Marvel Comics, as part of those series. This led to her and Marvel Studios president Kevin Feige pursuing a series centered on that character instead. By October 2021, a "dark comedy" spin-off from WandaVision centered on Kathryn Hahn as Agatha was in early development for Disney+ from Marvel Studios, with Schaeffer returning as head writer and executive producer.

During a Disney+ Day event in November 2021, the series was officially announced, with Schaeffer revealed to be directing episodes of the series a year later. By October 2023, Marvel Studios was changing its approach to television, hiring more traditional showrunners instead of head writers. Schaeffer was being credited as the series' showrunner by July 2024. Marvel Studios' Feige, Louis D'Esposito, Winderbaum and Mary Livanos served as executive producers. Released under Marvel Studios' Marvel Television label, Agatha All Along was later announced to be second in a trilogy of series that includes WandaVision and VisionQuest (2026).

=== Writing ===
The concept of forming a coven stemmed from the writers' desire to place Agatha Harkness in her "worst-nightmare" scenario—engaging in a sense of community. Episode writer Laura Donney likened her experience writing the episode to crafting "the real pilot", emphasizing its role in establishing character groundwork and story setup. She noted the challenges of presenting exposition engagingly while offering nuanced glimpses into the ensemble characters. Schaeffer explained that to conceptualize the characters in Agatha Harkness' coven, the writers aimed to represent diverse areas of witchcraft expertise to expand the Marvel Cinematic Universe (MCU)'s witch lore. They also included women of varying ages to align with the overarching theme of Maiden, Mother, Crone. Schaeffer wanted to include a cameo appearance of Patty Guggenheim's Maddisyn King of She-Hulk: Attorney at Law (2022) as a joke to Lilia Calderu's comment about witch stereotypes like those who talk to goats, thus considering Maddisyn to join Agatha's coven to walk into the Witches' Road, but ultimately realized she would have "shoe-horn" King into the journey so she let the idea go.

=== Casting ===
The episode stars Kathryn Hahn as Agatha Harkness, Joe Locke as Teen, Sasheer Zamata as Jennifer Kale, Ali Ahn as Alice Wu-Gulliver, Patti LuPone as Lilia Calderu and Debra Jo Rupp as Sharon Davis. David A Payton reprises his WandaVision role as Herb, while the Salem Seven include Okwui Okpokwasili as Vertigo, Marina Mazepa as "Snake", Bethany Curry as "Crow", Athena Perample as "Fox", Britta Grant as "Rat", Alicia Vela-Bailey as "Owl" and Chau Naumova as "Coyote".

=== Design ===
Originally conceived as a redaction bar, the sigil on Teen's mouth was later designed as a rune to maintain a connection with the lore established in WandaVision and carried over into the MCU film Doctor Strange in the Multiverse of Madness (2022). Its "serif" look was developed to highlight the "lyricism" that the series is predicated on, and to create the illusion of Teen's mouth being stitched shut.

Costume designer Daniel Selon created a "Road" look for each character, which was the costume they would appear in on the Witches' Road. To emphasize Agatha Harkness' "lone crow" status, her coat incorporated feather-like shapes to the lapel, hints of crow's feet on the belt, and pleats in the back to resemble a tail. The coat was lined with a murmuration of crows that blended into runes towards the bottom. Jennifer Kale's dress featured details based on her character such as mushrooms, hands bound by rope, lavender, a mixing bowl, and celestial bodies printed in gold foil. Alice Wu-Gulliver's look was designed to reflect her guarded emotional state with a "Cyberpunk" jacket reminiscent of armor with a burning house illustrated on the back. Lilia Calderu's shawl collar served as a showcase for emroidered vignettes depicting her connection to the concepts of time, wisdom and longevity.

=== Filming ===
Filming "The Ballad of the Witches' Road" musical number required the cast to sing on set as a group before performing individually for closeup shots without accompaniment. LuPone suggested imbuing their performances with vulnerability to reflect the characters' apprehension and add depth to the scene, an idea welcomed by Schaeffer, who server as showrunner and the episode director.

=== Music ===
In September 2024, Michael Paraskevas was revealed to have composed the series' score with Christophe Beck. It was released digitally by Marvel Music and Hollywood Records in two volumes: music from the first five episodes was released on October 11, 2024, and the music from the last four episodes was released on November 1, 2024. A soundtrack album was released on vinyl featuring all versions of "The Ballad of the Witches' Road", as well as selected tracks from the score, on October 30, 2024.

The episode features "The Ballad of the Witches' Road (Sacred Chant Version)", the second of several versions of the song performed across the series. Schaeffer envisioned the series with a song by Robert Lopez and Kristen Anderson-Lopez in mind as a successor to the impact of "Agatha All Along". Serving as both a narrative device and a thematic anchor, the "Ballad of the Witches' Road" incorporates lore and hidden clues in its lyrics, a result of close collaboration between the Lopezes and the writing team.

== Reception ==
=== Viewership ===
Disney announced that "Seekest Thou the Road" attracted 9.3 million views globally within its first seven days of streaming. The two-episode premiere also garnered over 9.8 million viewers during its premiere week. It became the No. 1 television show on Disney+ during that period. Nielsen Media Research, which records streaming viewership on U.S. television screens, estimated that the series was viewed for 426 million minutes from September 16–22. JustWatch, a guide to streaming content with access to data from more than 40 million users around the world, reported it as the third most-streamed series in the U.S. from September 16–22.

=== Critical response ===
The review aggregator website Rotten Tomatoes reported a 100% approval rating based on ten reviews. The site's critical consensus reads, "Circle Sewn with Fate successfully builds upon its premiere and introduces a spectacular crew of Witches to boot in the likes of Patti LuPone, Sasheer Zamata and Ali Ahn."

Lyra Hale of Fangirlish gave the episode an A grade and wrote: "Agatha All Along season 1 episode 2 hit its stride while bringing a whole cast of characters in that don't get swallowed up by [Kathryn] Hahn's greatness or [Aubrey] Plaza's intensity." Hale praised the episode for allowing "each of the additional coven members to have plot development outside of Agatha" and celebrated Hahn's performance, noting, "I couldn't keep my eyes off of her and everything that she said had me hooked." Collider's Taylor Gates rated the episode 8/10, feeling the series started to "really come together" and finding the practical sets to be "gorgeous". In a 4.5/5 review, Jean Henegan of Pop Culture Maniacs opined the series was "off to a great start [...] with interesting characters, fun performances, and a relatively simple story – something most MCU series fail at – that appears to be totally uninterested in "redeeming" Agatha as a villain and very interested in letting her simply be the morally bankrupt character we loved from WandaVision – just with much more personally at stake this time around." Henegan lauded the supporting cast, remarking that "the epic Patti LuPone, Debra-Jo Rupp, Ali Ahn, and Sasheer Zamata have all been uniformly excellent."

Sunshine State Cineplex critic Alan French awarded the episode a score of 9/10, expressing interest in Agatha Harkness and Teen's dynamic by stating, "Something is very obviously off in this relationship, and it opens the door to the mystery-box dynamic that helped WandaVision land as a grand success." French commented positively on the episode's introduction of horror elements, which worked "well as a tension builder." Caroline Framke from Vulture praised the musical number, describing "The Ballad of the Witches' Road" as "an earworm of a song to act as a hook for the show." Tell-Tale TV's Mufsin Mahbub enjoyed Agatha's depiction in the episode, noting that "Kathryn Hahn continues to own the role of Agatha Harkness with her quippy dialogue and deliciously devilish persona," and called Locke "one of the biggest standouts [...], who plays more of the audience's eyes as we are thrown into Agatha's world." Mahbub concluded by stating, "There's enough lore for fans to get invested and bring in enough intrigue into what's happening with Agatha and the rest of these characters."

=== Accolades ===
Accolades received by Agatha All Along
Award	Date of ceremony	Category	Recipient	Result	Ref.
Dorian TV Awards	July 8, 2025	Best TV Musical Performance	Kathryn Hahn, Patti LuPone, Ali Ahn, Sasheer Zamata	Nominated	
Music Supervisors Guild Awards	February 23, 2025	Best Song Written and/or Recorded for Television	Kristen Anderson-Lopez, Robert Lopez, Ali Ahn, Kathryn Hahn, Patti LuPone, Debra Jo Rupp, Sasheer Zamata, Dave Jordan, and Justine von Winterfeldt (for "The Ballad of the Witches' Road (Sacred Chant Version)")	Won	
Primetime Creative Arts Emmy Awards	September 14, 2025	Outstanding Original Music and Lyrics	Kristen Anderson-Lopez, Robert Lopez	Nominated	
