= Agatha All Along =

2024 Marvel Studios television miniseries

- Genre: Dark comedy; Fantasy; Superhero
- Created by: Jac Schaeffer
- Based on: Marvel Comics
- Showrunner: Jac Schaeffer
- Starring: Kathryn Hahn; Joe Locke; Debra Jo Rupp; Aubrey Plaza; Sasheer Zamata; Ali Ahn; Okwui Okpokwasili; Patti LuPone; Evan Peters; Maria Dizzia; Paul Adelstein; Miles Gutierrez-Riley
- Theme music composer: Kristen Anderson-Lopez; Robert Lopez
- Composers: Christophe Beck; Michael Paraskevas
- Country of origin: United States
- Original language: English
- No. of seasons: 1
- No. of episodes: 9

Production
- Executive producers: Kevin Feige; Louis D'Esposito; Brad Winderbaum; Mary Livanos; Robert Kulzer; Jac Schaeffer
- Producer: Julie Herrin
- Production locations: Atlanta, Georgia; Los Angeles, California
- Cinematography: Caleb Heymann; Isiah Donté Lee; Jon Chema
- Editors: Jamie Gross; David Egan; Libby Cuenin; Dane R. Naimy
- Running time: 29–49 minutes
- Production company: Marvel Television
- Budget: < $40 million

Original release
- Network: Disney+
- Release: September 18 – October 30, 2024

Related
- WandaVision; VisionQuest; Marvel Cinematic Universe television series

Agatha All Along is an American television miniseries created by Jac Schaeffer for the streaming service Disney+, based on Marvel Comics featuring the character Agatha Harkness. A spin-off from the miniseries WandaVision (2021), it is the 11th television series in the Marvel Cinematic Universe (MCU) from Marvel Studios and the first to be produced under its Marvel Television label. The series shares continuity with the films of the MCU. Schaeffer served as showrunner and lead director.

Kathryn Hahn reprises her role as Agatha Harkness from WandaVision, with Joe Locke, Debra Jo Rupp, Aubrey Plaza, Sasheer Zamata, Ali Ahn, Okwui Okpokwasili, Patti LuPone, Evan Peters, Maria Dizzia, Paul Adelstein, and Miles Gutierrez-Riley also starring. Development began in October 2021 with Schaeffer and Hahn attached, and the series was formally announced the next month. Schaeffer, Rachel Goldberg, and Gandja Monteiro were set as directors in early 2023 ahead of filming, which took place from January to May 2023 at Trilith Studios in Atlanta, Georgia, and in Los Angeles. Cast and crew returned from WandaVision, including the series' musical team. Several titles were announced for the series as part of a marketing campaign before the official title of Agatha All Along—after the song of the same name from WandaVision—was announced in May 2024. The series was described as the second installment in a trilogy that began with WandaVision and was followed by VisionQuest (2026).

Agatha All Along premiered on Disney+ on September 18, 2024, and ran for nine episodes until October 30, as part of Phase Five of the MCU. It received positive reviews from critics, who praised the performances of Hahn, Locke, LuPone and Plaza, as well as the plot twists, character development, and portrayal of queer themes. For her performance, Hahn received a Golden Globe Award nomination. The series also earned three Primetime Emmy Award nominations.

== Premise ==
Three years after being trapped under a magical spell in the town of Westview, New Jersey, at the end of the miniseries WandaVision (2021), the witch Agatha Harkness escapes with the help of a mysterious teenager who wishes to face the trials of the legendary Witches' Road. Without her magical powers, Agatha and the teen form a new coven of witches to face the trials while contending with some of Agatha's old enemies.

== Cast and characters ==
- Kathryn Hahn as Agatha Harkness:
  A witch who was trapped under the spell of Wanda Maximoff as "Agnes O'Connor" in the series finale of WandaVision (2021). Agatha forms a new coven of witches after escaping from the spell and finding herself powerless. Executive producer Mary Livanos described Agatha as both heartfelt and dangerous, as well as a survivor who needs to learn to work within a coven to regain her power. Hahn enjoyed getting to the root of what is broken in Agatha underneath her sass and sarcasm.
- Joe Locke as Billy Maximoff and William Kaplan:
  A "familiar" with a dark sense of humor who acts as the assistant to Agatha's coven. He is referred to as "Teen" by the other characters, who are unable to perceive his name or any identifying information about him because of a "Glamour"—a sigil hex—placed upon him. Locke initially described the character as "very thoughtful and kind" as well as impulsive, with "fanboy-esque" feelings about witchcraft and a dream to join Agatha's coven and travel the Witches' Road. The character is revealed to be William Kaplan, a Jewish teen who dies during a car accident and whose body is inhabited by the soul of Wanda and Vision's son, Billy Maximoff, shortly after his "death" in the finale of WandaVision. To portray Billy's magic, Locke worked with the same movement coach Elizabeth Olsen trained with for her previous MCU appearances as Wanda.
- Debra Jo Rupp as Sharon Davis:
  A Westview, New Jersey, resident whom Agatha enlists to her coven, standing in for a required "green witch". Much to her frustration, she continues to be referred to as "Mrs. Hart", the character she was forced to play in the WandaVision sitcom.
- Aubrey Plaza as Death / Rio Vidal: The original Green Witch and Agatha's former lover, later revealed to be the embodiment of death
- Sasheer Zamata as Jennifer "Jen" Kale: A bound sorceress and member of Agatha's coven who is a potions expert
- Ali Ahn as Alice Wu-Gulliver:
  A member of Agatha's coven and an ex-police officer who is a protector witch. Alice's family has been afflicted by a generational curse that causes them to be haunted by a demon.
- Okwui Okpokwasili as Vertigo: A member of the Salem Seven
- Patti LuPone as Lilia Calderu:
  A 450-year-old Sicilian witch and member of Agatha's coven who experiences time in a non-linear fashion, and whose skill is in divination. Chloe Camp portrays a young Lilia.
- Evan Peters as Ralph Bohner:
  A former resident of Westview who was previously trapped within the fictional WandaVision sitcom and controlled by Agatha to pose as Wanda's twin brother Pietro Maximoff
- Maria Dizzia as Rebecca Kaplan: William's mother
- Paul Adelstein as Jeff Kaplan: William's father
- Miles Gutierrez-Riley as Eddie: William's supportive boyfriend

Reprising their roles from WandaVision as Westview residents who play characters within Agatha's Agnes of Westview reality are Emma Caulfield as Sarah Proctor / "Dottie Jones", David Payton as John Collins / "Herb Feltman", David Lengel as Sarah's husband Harold Proctor / "Phil Jones", Asif Ali as Abilash Tandon / "Norm Gentilucci", and Amos Glick as a pizza delivery man / "Dennis Webber". Kate Forbes also reprises her role from WandaVision as Agatha's mother Evanora Harkness.

The remaining six members of the Salem Seven are Marina Mazepa as "Snake", Bethany Curry as "Crow", Athena Perample as "Fox", Britta Grant as "Rat", Alicia Vela-Bailey as "Owl", and Chau Naumova as "Coyote". Additional guest stars include: Elizabeth Anweis as Alice's mother Lorna Wu; Laura Boccaletti as Lilia's Maestra; Scott Butler as a doctor linked to Jen's past; Jade Quon as the demon from the Wu's curse; and Abel Lysenko as Nicholas Scratch, Agatha's son. Hannah Lowther, Tetra Lloyd White, Henriette Zoutomou, Holly Bonney, and Kim Bass appear as witches trapped by Agatha and Nicholas during the 1750s.

== Episodes ==
No.	Title	Directed by	Written by	Original release date
1	"Seekest Thou the Road"	Jac Schaeffer	Jac Schaeffer	September 18, 2024
Three years after her defeat by Wanda Maximoff, the witch Agatha Harkness is still trapped under Wanda's spell in Westview, New Jersey. (Note: As depicted in the WandaVision episode "The Series Finale" (2021)) She believes herself to be the police detective Agnes O'Connor within a crime noir television series titled Agnes of Westview, where she is fixated on a Jane Doe murder case. One night, a teenager breaks into Agnes's house, looking for "The Road". Agnes believes he is tied to the murder case and arrests him. Rio Vidal, an FBI agent, comes to Agnes and helps her remember her true identity. Waking up from the spell, Agatha realizes that her powers are gone and that Rio, a witch with whom Agatha has history, is there to kill her. Agatha convinces Rio to spare her until she gets her powers back, but Rio warns Agatha that the Salem Seven will soon come after her. After Rio leaves, Agatha is unsure what to do about the "Teen," whom she tied up while under the influence of Wanda's spell.
2	"Circle Sewn with Fate / Unlock Thy Hidden Gate"	Jac Schaeffer	Laura Donney	September 18, 2024
Teen reveals he freed Agatha from the spell and wishes to travel the Witches' Road, which rewards any witch who survives its trials what they desire most—in Agatha's case, the restoration of her powers. Agatha also realizes magic is preventing her from learning any personal information about Teen, including his name. Needing a coven to open a portal to the Road, the pair recruit witches Lilia Calderu, Jennifer "Jen" Kale, and Alice Wu-Gulliver, who all want to walk the Road as well for their own reasons. Needing a "green witch" but not wanting to recruit Rio, Agatha turns to Westview resident Sharon Davis, a talented but nonmagical gardener. The four witches and Sharon perform the ritual to open the gate to the Road, and they and Teen travel through it, narrowly escaping the Salem Seven. The group then removes their footwear and sets off on the Witches' Road.
3	"Through Many Miles / Of Tricks and Trials"	Rachel Goldberg	Cameron Squires	September 25, 2024
Agatha explains that to reach the end of the Road, the coven will face trials focused on different branches of witchcraft. They also realize that Teen's sigil prevents any witch from learning his identity. At the first trial, the coven finds a coastal house with a bottle of wine that everyone but Teen drinks. Jen privately warns Teen not to trust Agatha, who is said to have traded her child for the Darkhold. A timer starts counting down, and Jen realizes the wine was poisoned as Sharon faints. As they gather ingredients to create an antidote, the witches hallucinate: Lilia sees her younger self and her maestra from the Renaissance era, Jen hallucinates a doctor forcing her underwater, Alice sees her mother Lorna Wu about to die by suicide, and Agatha sees a crib containing the Darkhold. As they prepare the antidote, the house teleports underwater, threatening to drown the coven. With a few seconds left, they finish the antidote, drink it, and feed it to Sharon. Water pours in, but a tunnel appears in the oven and the coven escapes through it back to the Road. As they recover, Teen discovers that Sharon is dead.
4	"If I Can't Reach You / Let My Song Teach You"	Rachel Goldberg	Giovanna Sarquis	October 2, 2024
After burying Sharon, the coven is forced to summon a replacement green witch. Rio is summoned by their spell, much to Agatha's annoyance. The coven encounter a house with a 1970s aesthetic that prompts renewed feelings of grief for Alice as it turns out to be a recording studio tied to Lorna. Teen accidentally plays a record backward, summoning the demon who is the source of the curse in Alice's family. To fight it, the group plays Lorna's version of the Ballad, revealed to be a protection spell, and Alice is able to kill the demon. As the coven leaves the house, they notice Teen was severely wounded during the trial. Back on the Road, Jen heals his wound, saving his life. Later on, Lilia, Alice, and Jen bond while Rio alludes to her history with Agatha. Teen asks Agatha what happened to her son, but she does not answer. Later, as Agatha tries to kiss Rio, she tells Agatha that Teen is not her son.
5	"Darkest Hour / Wake Thy Power"	Rachel Goldberg	Laura Monti	October 9, 2024
The Salem Seven arrive on the Road and chase the coven, who evade them using makeshift flying broomsticks. After being pulled back down by the Road, they enter the next trial, which takes the form of a cabin with a 1980s aesthetic. The group uses a Ouija board and makes contact with Agatha's mother Evanora, who was killed by Agatha in 1693 along with her previous coven. (Note: As depicted in the WandaVision episode "Previously On" (2021)) Warning the coven to leave Agatha behind, Evanora possesses her and attacks the group. Alice uses her powers to expel Evanora from Agatha, who proceeds to absorb Alice's magic. Teen, noticing another spirit's presence, stops Agatha by shouting its name: Agatha's son Nicholas Scratch, but not before Alice dies. Agatha insists that it was accidental, but Teen lashes out at her. When Lilia and Jen affirm that their goals are the same as Agatha's, Teen is angered. He magically forces Lilia and Jen to toss Agatha into a mud trap, then blasts them in as well. As the witches sink, a headpiece similar to the Scarlet Witch's appears on Teen's head.
6	"Familiar by Thy Side"	Gandja Monteiro	Jason Rostovsky	October 16, 2024
In flashbacks, William Kaplan, a teenager from Eastview, is celebrating his bar mitzvah where he encounters Lilia. Reading on his palm something she does not disclose, Lilia casts a sigil on William to protect him and instantly forgets his identity. The party ends when the Hex, created nearby by Wanda, begins to collapse. While driving past Westview, William dies in a car accident, but at that moment, Billy Maximoff's soul enters William's body. "William" struggles to adjust after the accident due to his newfound ability to read minds and his lack of memory of his life before. Three years later, William and his boyfriend Eddie meet with Ralph Bohner, who used to be controlled by Agatha inside the Hex. He tells them about what happened there and about Wanda and Vision's twins Billy and Tommy, making William realize he is actually Billy. Determined to use the Witches' Road to find Tommy, Billy goes to Agatha and breaks Wanda's spell. (Note: As depicted in "Seekest Thou the Road") In the present, Agatha escapes the mud and, realizing the sigil has been destroyed, deduces Billy's goal and tells him that they must continue together since he cannot control his power.
7	"Death's Hand in Mine"	Jac Schaeffer	Gia King & Cameron Squires	October 23, 2024
Agatha and Billy continue on the Road before coming across a castle. When they enter, costumes of witches from popular culture appear on them and they are presented with tarot cards. If they do not place the proper cards in the correct sequence, swords hanging from the ceiling fall down. Flashbacks from Lilia's first lesson in divination reveal that she has been experiencing her life out of order, explaining her memory lapses and precognitive abilities. After falling through the mud, Lilia discovers that Rio is the personification of Death. She awakens Jen, and after evading the Salem Seven, they travel through the tunnels, reuniting with Agatha and Billy. Realising the trial is hers, Lilia places the cards in their proper order, saving them all. Prompting everyone to flee through the exit, Lilia chooses to stay behind as the Salem Seven approach. She flips one of the cards, causing the entire room to flip and impaling the Seven and herself on the swords. In the last scene, a young Lilia gleefully attends her first lesson in divination. The episode is narrated out of sequence to portray Lilia's non-linear perception of time.
8	"Follow Me My Friend / To Glory at the End"	Gandja Monteiro	Peter Cameron	October 30, 2024
After guiding Alice's spirit to the afterlife, Rio meets Agatha and agrees to leave her alone in exchange for Billy, who has disrupted the cosmic balance by gaining a second life. Billy and Jen rejoin Agatha at the end of the Road and discover that it is a circle. Billy puts his shoes back on, and the three are transported to a version of Agatha's basement. Jen learns that Agatha is the one who bound her magic and performs an unbinding ritual, regaining her abilities and vanishing, having gotten what she needed from the Road. Agatha helps Billy locate Tommy's soul and Billy places it in the body of a drowning boy, then vanishes himself. Then, Agatha grows a flower within a floor crack, completing the trial. She escapes into her backyard, where Rio attacks her. Billy intervenes and gives Agatha some of his power, but Rio orders them to choose who goes with her. Hesitant at first, Agatha kisses Rio and dies. Rio leaves and Billy returns home. Upon entering his bedroom, he realizes that many of the objects in it match aspects of the Road and hears Agatha laughing.
9	"Maiden Mother Crone"	Gandja Monteiro	Jac Schaeffer & Laura Donney	October 30, 2024
In 1750, Agatha gives birth to Nicholas. Death appears to take the baby, but hearing Agatha's pleas, she gives Agatha extra time with him. Agatha spends the next six years raising her son while killing witches, which Nicholas grows to oppose. Together, they create a children's song that would eventually become the Ballad of the Witches' Road. Eventually, Nicholas grows sick and Death takes him, devastating Agatha. With nothing holding her back, Agatha spends centuries murdering witches and stealing their powers by conning them with the promise of the Road. In the present, Agatha, now a ghost, tells Billy that the Road wasn't real until he made it so with his magic. Billy blames himself for the deaths of Lilia, Alice, and Sharon, but Agatha retorts that she was already planning to kill them and that Jen is still alive, so he spared a life. Billy returns to Westview and tries to banish Agatha, but she resists, afraid to face Nicholas in the afterlife, so Billy relents and allows Agatha to guide him. After sealing the entrance to the Road and recording the names of the fallen, Billy and Agatha set out to find Tommy.

== Production ==
=== Development ===
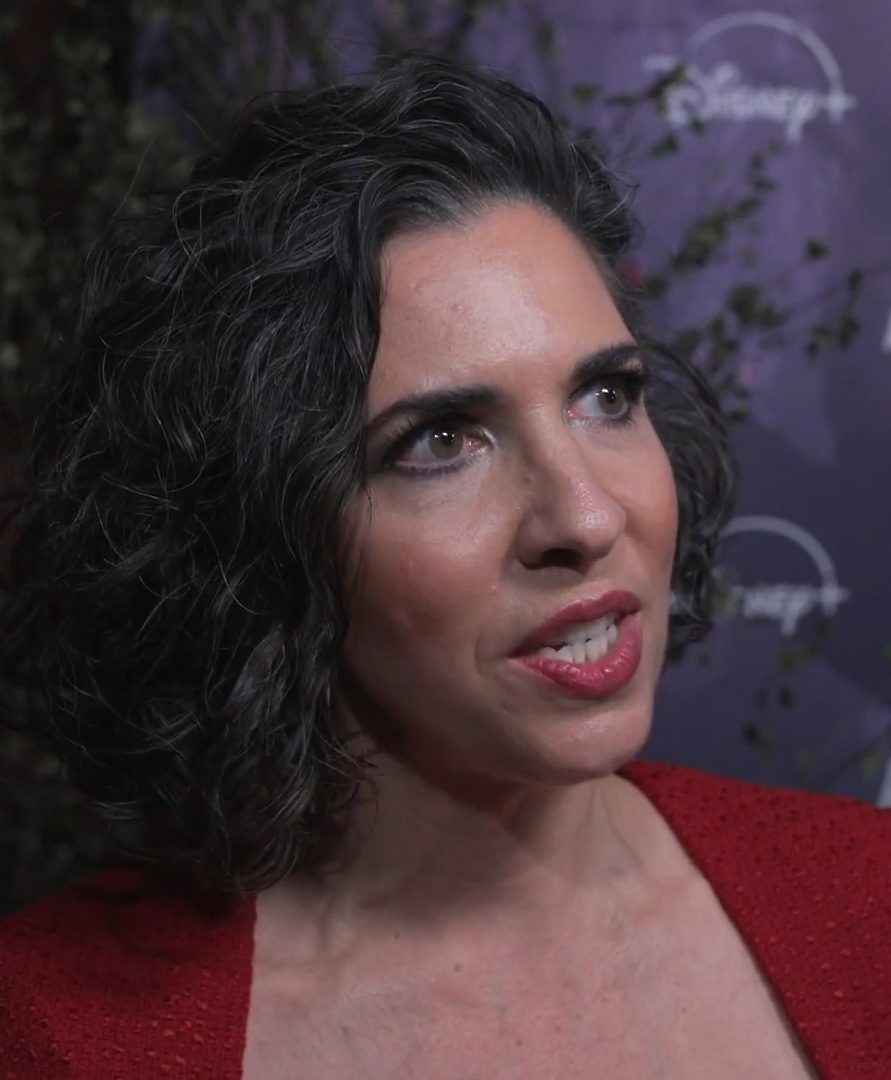
Jac Schaeffer is the showrunner and lead director of Agatha All Along.

At Disney's biennial D23 Expo convention in August 2019, Kathryn Hahn was revealed to be cast in the role of Agnes, Wanda Maximoff and Vision's neighbor, in the Marvel Studios Disney+ television series WandaVision (2021). That series' seventh episode reveals that "Agnes" is actually Agatha Harkness, a powerful witch from Marvel Comics. In May 2021, WandaVision head writer Jac Schaeffer signed a three-year overall television deal with Marvel Studios and 20th Television to develop additional projects for the studios' Disney+ slate. In pitches for several different projects centered on various characters, Schaeffer kept suggesting that Agatha be included as part of those series. This led to her and Marvel Studios president Kevin Feige pursuing a series centered on that character instead. By October 2021, a "dark comedy" spin-off from WandaVision centered on Hahn as Agatha was in early development for Disney+ from Marvel Studios, with Schaeffer returning from WandaVision as head writer and executive producer. Hahn's involvement was part of a larger deal she signed with Marvel Studios to reprise her role in series and films.

During a Disney+ Day event in November 2021, the series was officially announced. Schaeffer was revealed to be directing episodes of the series a year later, and Gandja Monteiro was revealed as another director in December 2022, along with Rachel Goldberg in January 2023. Each directed three episodes of the series. By October 2023, Marvel Studios was changing its approach to television, hiring more traditional showrunners instead of head writers; Schaeffer was being credited as the series' showrunner by July 2024. Brad Winderbaum, the head of streaming, television, and animation at Marvel Studios, said Agatha All Along was the studio's least expensive series, costing less than the $40 million budget of Echo (2024), and he attributed this to the series' use of practical effects rather than computer-generated imagery. Marvel Studios' Feige, Louis D'Esposito, Winderbaum, and Mary Livanos also served as executive producers. The series is being released under Marvel Studios' "Marvel Television" label. Actress Debra Jo Rupp, who returned from WandaVision, described the spin-off as being a second season of WandaVision in an anthology sense, similar to the different seasons of the television series American Horror Story (2011–present). Agatha All Along is second in a trilogy of series that includes WandaVision and VisionQuest (2026).

==== Title ====
Multiple fake names for the series were announced before the title of Agatha All Along was eventually confirmed in May 2024. The marketing stunt and fake titles were conceived by Schaeffer and the writers; Livanos enjoyed releasing "crazier and crazier" titles throughout the series' promotion and felt it was appropriate for Agatha. The series was first announced in November 2021 with the title Agatha: House of Harkness, which was replaced by Agatha: Coven of Chaos in July 2022. In September 2023, the title was reported to have changed to Agatha: Darkhold Diaries. Actress Aubrey Plaza had previously posted a photo in May 2023 of a director's chair with that title, in a font based on the one used for the Disney film The Princess Diaries (2001). Adam B. Vary at Variety suggested that the multiple title changes were not caused by indecision from Marvel Studios and were instead indicating that the main character was "up to her old skulduggery", and he said it was possible that the series was simply titled Agatha; that is what the series was referred to as in a filing for the first episode with the United States Copyright Office as well as on the official Disney+ website.

External videos
- Marvel Studios post from May 2024 presents the progression of titles for the series, set to the song "Agatha All Along"; Twitter video from Marvel Studios' account

In May 2024, Marvel Studios released a new logo on Twitter with the title Agatha: The Lying Witch with Great Wardrobe, but took down the post soon after. Germain Lussier at Gizmodo thought this may have been a joke or a mistake and noted that it was referencing the C. S. Lewis novel The Lion, the Witch and the Wardrobe (1950). He felt it was "the worst title of the bunch" despite being accurate to the character, and questioned why the series had received so many publicly announced titles during development. He felt the best choice would be Agatha All Along, referring to the 'theme song' of the same name used when Agatha was revealed as the true villain in WandaVision. The next day, Disney announced at an upfront presentation that the official title was Agatha All Along, and released a video showing that the changing titles were "orchestrated by [Agatha] as a way of messing with Marvel fans".

=== Writing ===
Laura Donney, Cameron Squires, Giovanna Sarquis, Laura Monti, Jason Rostovsky, Gia King, and Peter Cameron served as writers on the series, alongside Schaeffer. Squires, Cameron, Donney, and Monti all returned from WandaVision, alongside Megan McDonnell, who was a consulting producer, serving as the on-set writer. Monti had served as Schaeffer's assistant on WandaVision, aiding in the creation of the acclaimed line "What is grief, if not love persevering?" King and Rostovsky contributed to the writing process with their respective interests in divination and gothic horror. Livanos said the chance to continue Agatha Harkness's story and to get to know the character further was "immediately an imperative" for the creatives. Winderbaum compared Agatha All Along to Marvel Studios' series Loki (2021–2023), because they both feature antiheroes, are different from the studios' other series, and explore similar emotional depths for their title characters. The series continues the WandaVision trilogy theme of exploring parenthood, specifically motherhood. Winderbaum called Agatha All Along a "Halloween show" that features a "Marvel brand of scary" with deadly stakes, while still being fun and dramatic. Feige likened Agatha All Along to the film The Goonies (1985). Comics that influenced the series included Scarlet Witch vol. 2 by James Robinson that introduced the Witches' Road, Agatha Harkness's early appearances in Fantastic Four, and The Vision and the Scarlet Witch vol. 2.

Schaeffer said Agatha All Along would follow Agatha as she is joined by "a disparate, mixed bag of witches" who are all coven-less, explaining that the series would explore what happens when these witches, who are "defined by deception, treachery, villainy and selfishness", are forced to work together. She also noted that the series plays with witch lore and assumptions about them, in a similar way to how WandaVision played with the sitcom format, looking to have "a similar mechanism and involve pastiche" as that series did. Schaeffer was able to define witchcraft within the MCU with the series. The first episode sees Agatha in a true crime drama as a detective, in an homage to the HBO miniseries Mare of Easttown (2021). As Agatha and her coven travel the Witches' Road, each of its trials alters the attire of the coven to "emulate a particular kind of witch from pop culture": "WASP-y east coast women in collared shirts" which Schaeffer described as "coastal grandma chic" who are "backstabbing and duplicitous", drawing from Practical Magic (1998); a "Fleetwood Mac-style band" drawing from singer Stevie Nicks' "white witch" era and the film Season of the Witch (1972); and 1980s summer camp attire using a ouija board. The series also draws from other well-known portrayals of witches, such as The Wizard of Oz (1939) and Maleficent (2014), incorporating visual cues and narrative elements inspired by these films. Early attempts at creating the trials were elemental based, which did not allow for the infusion of illusion or pop culture or the creativity from the costume and production design.

Agatha All Along is set in 2026, three years after the events of WandaVision, which saw Agatha trapped in her "Agnes" persona by Wanda Maximoff. However, the spell has now become distorted because of Maximoff's death in the MCU film Doctor Strange in the Multiverse of Madness (2022) and the Teen's intervention. Following the abundance of fan theories and speculation on WandaVision that ultimately were not intended for that series, Schaeffer was more careful with her language in Agatha All Along to still be able to protect some of the series' surprises while hoping it would not create expectations in the fandom that would not come to fruition, dismissing such as Thanos appearing due to his backstory with Death in the source material, with Schaeffer intending to just leave some of Death's characterization for interpretation in the show. The third episode included a reference to Mephisto as a reference to widespread Internet speculation of the character's rumored appearance during the initial release of WandaVision, but while he was included as a potential antagonist for the show in an early document during production, Schaeffer never really took the idea seriously due to feeling it wasn't logistically right for the miniseries plus Mephisto was never a character that really interested her, though she admitted that she didn't intend to toy with the audience's expectations of the character with the reference.

=== Casting ===
Hahn was expected to reprise her role in the series with the reveal of its development in October 2021, which was confirmed with the series' official announcement a month later. Emma Caulfield Ford revealed in October 2022 that she would reprise her role as Sarah Proctor / "Dottie Jones" from WandaVision. In November, Joe Locke, Aubrey Plaza, Ali Ahn, Maria Dizzia, and Sasheer Zamata joined the cast. Locke plays "Teen", the male lead of the series, while Plaza plays Rio Vidal. Ahn plays the witch Alice Wu-Gulliver, with Dizzia also reported to be portraying a witch, and Zamata set for the recurring role of the sorceress Jennifer "Jen" Kale. Patti LuPone joined the cast in December, as the witch Lilia Calderu. Miriam Margolyes turned down a role in the series after Marvel offered to pay her half of what she had asked for and because she did not want to film in Georgia.

In January 2023, several cast members were revealed to be reprising their roles from WandaVision: Debra Jo Rupp as Sharon Davis / "Mrs. Hart"; David Payton as John Collins / "Herb Feltman"; David Lengel as Harold Proctor / "Phil Jones"; Asif Ali as Abilash Tandon / "Norm Gentilucci"; Amos Glick as a pizza delivery man / "Dennis Webber"; Brian Brightman as the Eastview, New Jersey, sheriff; and Kate Forbes as Agatha's mother Evanora Harkness. Miles Gutierrez-Riley was cast as Teen's boyfriend, with Okwui Okpokwasili also cast in the series as Salem Seven member Vertigo. The series reveals that "Teen" is actually Billy Maximoff, who was previously portrayed by Julian Hilliard in WandaVision and Doctor Strange in the Multiverse of Madness.

Schaeffer wanted to include a cameo appearance of Patty Guggenheim's Madisynn King of She-Hulk: Attorney at Law (2022) as a joke to Lilia's comment about witch stereotypes like those who talk to goats, but ultimately realized they would have "shoe-horn" King into the Witches' Road so they let the idea go. In contrast, bringing Evan Peters back as Ralph Bohner was always in the cards to provide some exposition because the COVID-19 pandemic cut most of his original role in WandaVision, though Schaeffer was ready to drop his inclusion if she had been unable to find a "correct way to deploy" Bohner into the plot as she did with King.

=== Design ===
Daniel Selon served as the costume designer, after previously working as an assistant costume designer on WandaVision, Doctor Strange in the Multiverse of Madness, and Thor: Love and Thunder (2022). John Collins was the production designer. The different witches in Agatha's coven all have their own styles which were categorized by Gordon Jackson of Gizmodo as the goth, the clairvoyant, the hippie and the "coastal grandmother". The series end credits examines where many of the misconceptions and stereotypes about witches originated.

=== Filming ===
Principal photography began on January 17, 2023, at Trilith Studios in Atlanta, Georgia, with Schaeffer, Monteiro, and Goldberg directing episodes of the series. Caleb Heymann, Jon Chema, and Isiah Donté Lee served as cinematographers. The series was filmed under the working title My Pretty. Filming with Rupp also occurred in Los Angeles by February 2023, before moving to Atlanta for two months. The start of the 2023 Writers Guild of America strike in May 2023 was not expected to impact production of Agatha All Along, with Marvel Studios reportedly planning to shoot what they could during principal photography and make any necessary writing adjustments during the series' already scheduled reshoots. Plaza filmed some of her scenes concurrent with the last two weeks of her commitments to Francis Ford Coppola's film Megalopolis (2024), also in Atlanta. Filming took place on Blondie Street at the Warner Bros. Ranch for Agatha's house and other Westview exteriors prior to the street being demolished.

Hahn stated that filming used as many practical elements as possible, including practical magic opposed to having it done through CGI. Livano said this was done to be an homage to the golden age of fantasy and horror films, using many in-camera effects such as backdrops, miniatures, special effects, makeup effects, and creature effects. The creatives wanted Agatha All Along to elicit similar nostalgic feelings for the audience as WandaVision had with that series' homage to sitcoms. Filming wrapped by May 28. Hahn said in January 2024 there were a few days left of reshoots to take place, which were completed in one day in early February.

=== Post-production ===
Jamie Gross, Libby Cuenin, Dane R. Naimy, and David Egan serve as editors on the series. Kelly Port served as the visual effects supervisor for Agatha All Along, after previously working on some MCU films, with Digital Domain providing visual effects.

=== Music ===
In January 2023, Hahn hinted that the series would include original songs similar to those featured in WandaVision such as "Agatha All Along". In March, Christophe Beck revealed that he would be returning from WandaVision and other MCU media to compose the score for the series. The following month, Kristen Anderson-Lopez and Robert Lopez were revealed to have written the series' original songs, also returning from WandaVision. Hahn serves as the lead singer for some songs, with the other witch actors such as LuPone acting as background singers. Schaeffer wanted to work with the composers to find a way to weave whatever songs they came up with into the series' narrative. One of their songs, "The Ballad of the Witches' Road", became an ancient tune in the series that all witches are familiar with. In September 2024, Michael Paraskevas was revealed to have composed the score with Beck, after previously working together in the MCU series Hawkeye (2021).

On September 19, Hollywood Records released the single album Songs from Marvel Television's Agatha All Along (Episodes 1 & 2), which includes two versions of "The Ballad of the Witches' Road"—one being "The Ballad of the Witches' Road (True Crime Version)" performed by Matthew Mayfield which was featured in the first episode, and "The Ballad of the Witches' Road (Sacred Chant Version)" in the second episode. Beck and Paraskevas' main theme composed for the series, titled "Agatha's Theme" was also released on the same day. On October 3, Songs from Agatha All Along (Episode 4) was released featuring "The Ballad of the Witches' Road (Lorna Wu's Version)" of the song performed by Seomoon Tak, as well as a 1970s rock cover performed by the cast. A pop version performed by the indie pop band Japanese Breakfast, featured in the finale, was released on October 17.

Beck and Paraskevas's score was released digitally by Marvel Music and Hollywood Records in two volumes: music from the first five episodes was released on October 11, 2024, and the music from the last four episodes was released on November 1, 2024. A soundtrack album was released on vinyl featuring all versions of "The Ballad of the Witches' Road", as well as selected tracks from the score, on October 30, 2024.

Agatha All Along: Vol. 1 (Episodes 1–5) [Original Soundtrack]
No.	Title	Length
1.	"Agatha's Theme"	2:11
2.	"Jane Doe"	2:34
3.	"The Ballad of the Witches' Road" (True Crime Version) (featuring Matthew Mayfield)	1:43
4.	"Nicky"	1:43
5.	"Let's Find Out Pt. 1"	2:53
6.	"All Along"	3:34
7.	"Coochie Coochie Coo"	4:10
8.	"The Coven March"	1:17
9.	"The Ballad of the Witches' Road" (Sacred Chant Version) (featuring Kathryn Hahn, Sasheer Zamata, Ali Ahn, Patti LuPone, and Debra Jo Rupp)	3:18
10.	"Salem's Seven"	2:49
11.	"The Ballad of the Witches' Road" (Score Version)	1:42
12.	"Wine & Die"	0:57
13.	"Lucid Spellbound Divination"	4:12
14.	"Sous Vide"	3:20
15.	"Out of the Brew"	4:01
16.	"Three of Pentacles"	2:39
17.	"Old Ass Curse"	3:45
18.	"Play It Rite"	2:12
19.	"The Ballad of the Witches' Road" (Cover Version) (featuring Kathryn Hahn, Sasheer Zamata, Ali Ahn, Patti LuPone, Aubrey Plaza, and Joe Locke)	4:40
20.	"Three of Swords"	2:14
21.	"Rio"	3:01
22.	"Broomhaha"	3:30
23.	"Spirits Be Known"	2:47
24.	"Séance in a Blood Moon"	2:32
25.	"Knight of Wands"	5:43
26.	"Heavy Is the Head..."	2:23
27.	"The Ballad of the Witches' Road" (Lorna Wu's Version) (featuring Seomoon Tak)	4:41
Total length:		1:15:11

Agatha All Along: Vol. 2 (Episodes 6–9) [Original Soundtrack]
No.	Title	Length
1.	"Rite of Passage"	1:20
2.	"Home Sweet Home"	3:54
3.	"Billy Kaplan"	1:38
4.	"Hooligan!"	2:04
5.	"Let's Find Out Pt. 2"	4:24
6.	"Tricks & Trials"	3:25
7.	"Magic Castle"	3:08
8.	"Queen of Cups"	3:48
9.	"The Tower (Reversed)"	3:36
10.	"Liminal Space"	2:57
11.	"Do Not Pass Go"	1:51
12.	"High Priestess"	3:31
13.	"One More Breath"	4:52
14.	"A Seed Resown"	2:34
15.	"Fisticuffs"	5:43
16.	"Kiss of Death"	2:48
17.	"Flowers"	2:48
18.	"Going Through the Motions"	2:12
19.	"Maiden Mother Crone"	3:03
20.	"From Birth"	1:30
21.	"Salem, 1756"	2:21
22.	"The Ballad of the Witches' Road" (Nicky's Version)	0:49
23.	"Down the Windy Road"	2:58
24.	"Hold Your Hand in Mine"	2:39
25.	"To Death"	2:00
26.	"The Ballad of the Witches' Road" (Agatha Through Time Version) (featuring Kathryn Hahn, Sasheer Zamata, Ali Ahn, and Patti LuPone)	2:36
27.	"One Door Opens"	3:35
28.	"The Ballad of the Witches' Road" (Pop Version) (featuring Japanese Breakfast)	4:41
Total length:		1:16:45

== Marketing ==
A first-look at the series was included in the bonus features of WandaVision's physical home media, which was released in late November 2023. Hahn, Locke, and LuPone promoted the series at Disney's May 2024 upfront presentation, where the release date and official title were announced and the first trailer was shown. The title announcement was accompanied by a video, which was released online, that shows the progression of announced titles for the series leading up to the official title, Agatha All Along. The video is set to the song of the same name from WandaVision.

A teaser trailer was released online on July 8, 2024. Michaela Zee at Variety noted how it cycled through various genres, the first of which presented Agatha as a detective in "a hardboiled murder mystery". Charles Pulliam-Moore at The Verge felt that the trailer was giving a "promising horror turn" and indicated that the series was darker and more "horror-oriented" than other Marvel projects. Jennifer Ouellette of Ars Technica wrote that the series looked like "a lot of dark, spooky fun" and was the perfect fit for a release in the Halloween season. Writing for Kotaku, Zack Zwiezen said the teaser was "promising a creepy, fun, and wild time" for the series. He was particularly curious about Rio's connection to Agatha and was excited for "a witchy, creepy, spooky show" for the Halloween season. Two days after the teaser's release, Hahn, who had been guest hosting the late-night talk show Jimmy Kimmel Live!, ended her opening monologue with a song recapping the MCU.

Feige promoted the series at Disney's D23 convention in August 2024 with the Lopezes and members of the cast. The latter performed the song "The Ballad of the Witches' Road" at the panel, where the official trailer for the series also debuted. Nina Starner of /Film praised the costumes, cast, and music featured in the trailer. Nick Romano of Entertainment Weekly compared the tone of the trailer to the film The Wizard of Oz (1939), particularly Agatha and Lilia respectively resembling the Wicked Witch of the West and Glinda from that film. Coinciding with the series' release in October, concept art by Imogene Chayes of Agatha Harkness and Rio Vidal was used as variant covers for Marvel Comics' Scarlet Witch #6 and Scarlet Witch #7, respectively.

== Release ==
Agatha All Along premiered on Disney+ with its first two episodes on September 18, 2024, with subsequent episodes released weekly, before concluding on October 30 with the final two episodes. The series consists of nine episodes, with the release coinciding with the Halloween season. The series was previously expected to debut as early as late 2023, but by February 2023 it was not included on a list of "sure bets" to be released that year amid Disney and Marvel Studios re-evaluating their content output. The series is part of Phase Five of the Marvel Cinematic Universe.

== Reception ==
=== Viewership ===
Disney announced that Agatha All Along attracted 9.3 million views globally within its first seven days of streaming. The series also garnered over 9.8 million viewers during its premiere week. It became the No. 1 television show on Disney+ during that period. Streaming analytics firm FlixPatrol, which monitors daily updated VOD charts across the globe, reported that the series ranked in the top 10 across 56 countries and territories as of October 2. Brad Winderbaum, head of streaming for Marvel Studios, noted that it achieved the highest audience retention rate of any Marvel series to date. Fan engagement on social media was also notably high, with enthusiasm comparable to the second season of Loki.

The streaming aggregator Reelgood, which tracks 20 million monthly viewing decisions across all U.S. streaming platforms for original and acquired content on SVOD and AVOD services, announced that Agatha All Along was the second most-streamed series in the U.S. during the week of September 19. Nielsen Media Research, which records streaming viewership on U.S. television screens, estimated that the series was viewed for 426 million minutes from September 16–22. It subsequently garnered 365 million minutes of watch time from September 23–29. The series returned to Nielsen's chart for the week of its fifth episode with 310 million minutes of watch time. It scored 410 million minutes viewed across its first six episodes the following week. The show tallied 744 million minutes of viewing on Disney+ for the week of October 28 – November 3, marking a 75% increase from its premiere week. Following its conclusion, the show retained a spot on the chart for the week of November 4–10 with 287 million minutes watched. JustWatch, a guide to streaming content with access to data from more than 40 million users around the world, reported it among the top ten most-streamed series in the U.S. from September 16 to November 3.

TVision, which uses its TVision Power Score to evaluate CTV programming performance by factoring in viewership and engagement across over 1,000 apps and incorporating four key metrics—viewer attention time, total program time available for the season, program reach, and app reach—calculated that Agatha All Along was the top-streaming show from September 16–29. It remained in the top five most-streamed shows from September 30 to October 20. Whip Media, which tracks viewership data for the more than 25 million worldwide users of its TV Time app, revealed that it was the second most-streamed original series in the U.S. from September 22 to October 6. It subsequently rose to first place from October 13–27.

Disney+, which calculates its "Top 10" list by considering daily views for episodes and movies alongside the growing popularity of newly released titles, announced that Agatha All Along was the second most popular title in the U.S. on October 30. Disney later revealed that the seventh episode of the show achieved 4.2 million views globally within its first day of streaming, marking a 35% increase compared to the premiere episode. The eighth episode garnered 4.6 million views on Disney+ within its first day, reflecting a nearly 10% increase from the viewership of the seventh episode. The series finale, which premiered the same night, drew 3.9 million first-day views. In comparison to the premiere episode's 3.1 million views, the eighth episode represented a 48% increase, while the ninth episode saw a 26% increase.

Luminate, which measures streaming performance in the U.S. by analyzing viewership data, audience engagement metrics, and content reach across various platforms, calculated that Agatha All Along was watched for 2,284 billion minutes in 2024. According to Nielsen's 35-day multiplatform ranking of the 2024-2025 television season, Agatha All Along was the ninth most-watched series among adults aged 18–49, with 5.9 million minutes viewed. It also placed 45th overall across all age groups, with a total of 9 million minutes of viewing time. These figures marked the highest viewership for a Disney+ original on both charts.

=== Critical response ===
Agatha All Along: Critical reception by episode
Percentage of positive critics' reviews tracked by the website Rotten Tomatoes

The series holds an 84% approval rating on review aggregator Rotten Tomatoes, based on 216 critic reviews with an average rating of 7.25/10. The website's critics consensus reads, "The marvelous Kathryn Hahn is backed up by a coven of memorable performers in this MCU spinoff that refreshingly concocts its own distinct brew." Metacritic, which uses a weighted average, gave the series a score of 66 out of 100, based on 32 critics, indicating "generally favorable" reviews.

Writing for the Rolling Stone, Alan Sepinwall noted that the series "works as a proper TV show rather than a chopped-up movie," while David Fear lauded the self-contained nature of the narrative, claiming it aligned with Disney+ output better than various other Marvel Studios properties. Eliana Dockterman of Time felt that showrunner Jac Schaeffer "seems to be one of the few writers working in the superhero realm who understands that emotional revelations are far more compelling than CGI magic," and wrote that "the greatest trick of Agatha All Along is that the show used its extended time on the small screen to make us empathize with Agatha and Billy." Lucy Mangan of The Guardian gave the show a grade of 5 out of 5, and lauded its exploration of multiple genres, stating, "This royally entertaining Marvel series slips seamlessly from comedy to tragedy." The performances of Hahn, Locke, LuPone and Plaza were all praised by critics. Hahn received particular recognition for her portrayal of Agatha Harkness, with Fear claiming the role was "pitched right in the actor's [Hahn's] sweet spot, between acerbic wit and rapidly approaching a nervous breakdown." Paul Bradshaw of NME praised Hahn for grounding the show's shifting tone, calling her performance "never funnier, never better, in a role she plays like a shot in the arm for Disney". Managan similarly wrote, "Kathryn Hahn is so good you can barely take your eyes off her" and commended the supporting cast, concluding that "although it remains indubitably Hahn's show [...] she is surrounded by excellence."

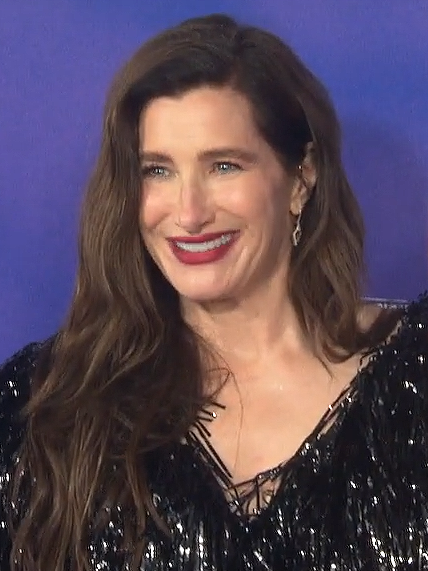
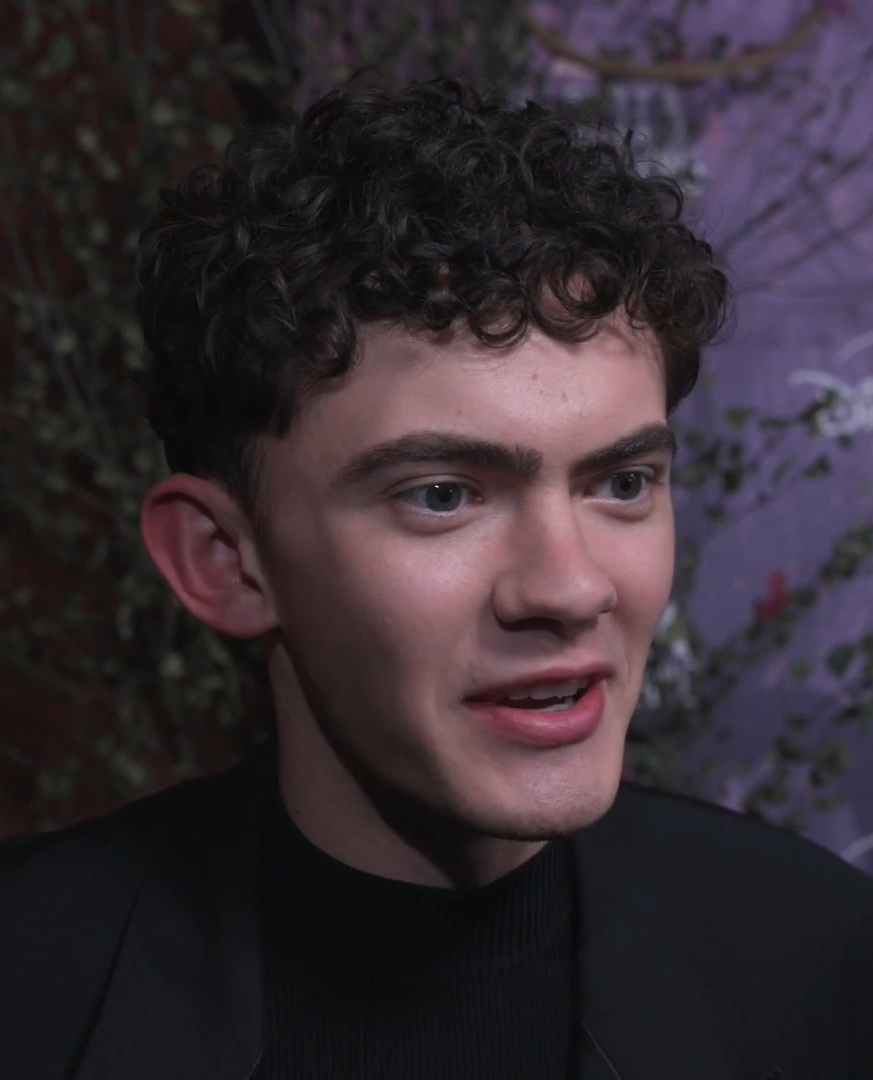
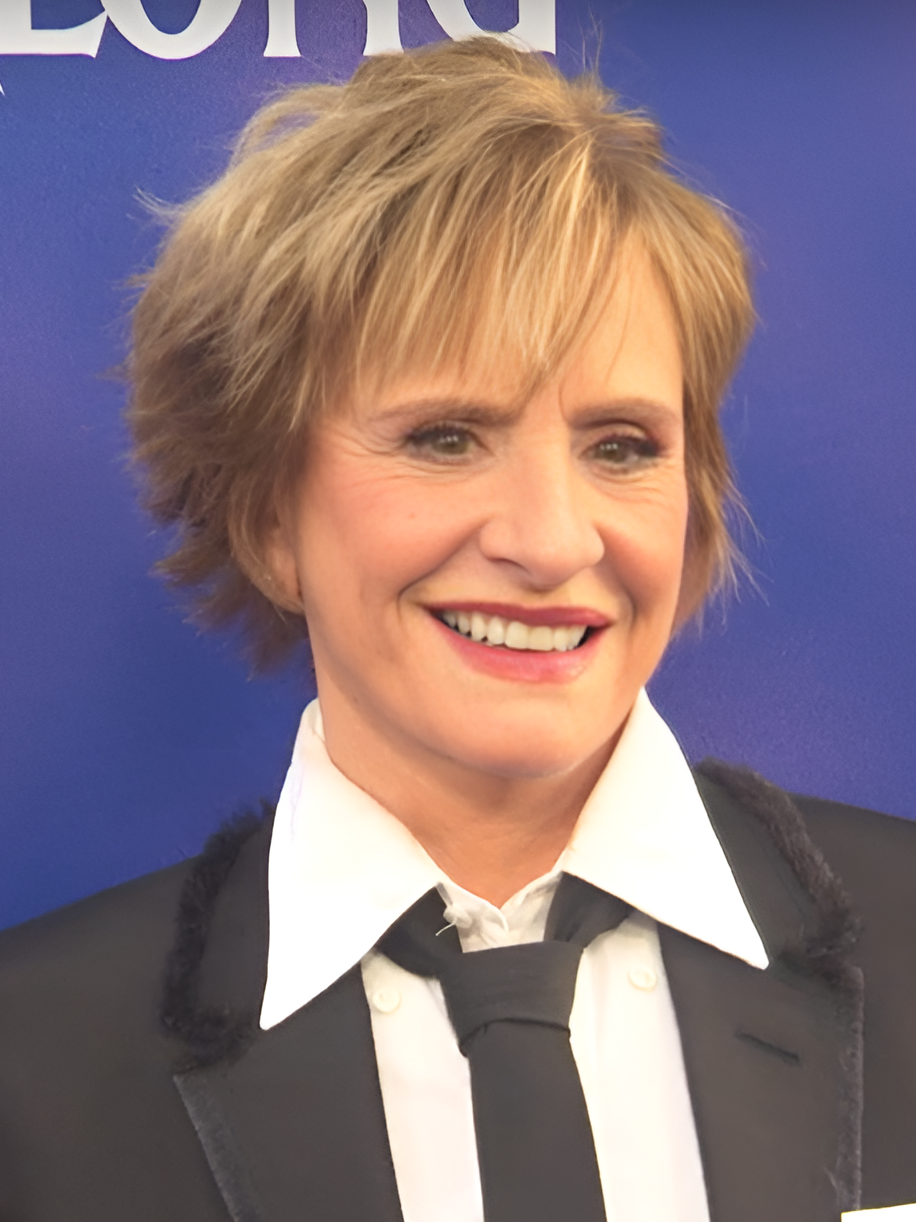
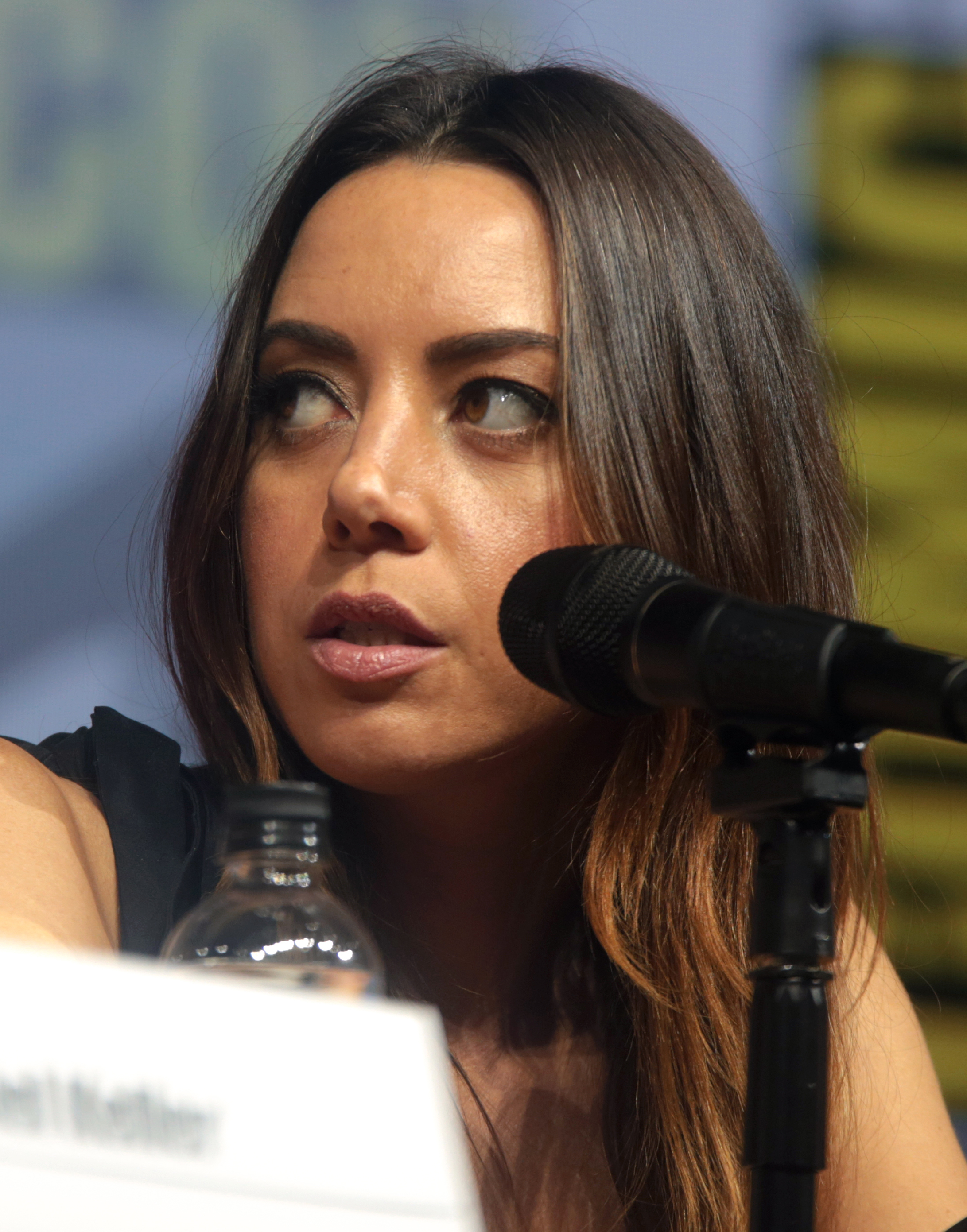
Kathryn Hahn, Joe Locke, Patti LuPone and Aubrey Plaza received critical praise for their performances in Agatha All Along.

The series garnered praise for its portrayal of queer themes and characters. Valerie Anne of Autostraddle noted that "queerness has been a thread in the tapestry of this show from the start, not only because of the inherent queerness of witches, but because of the presence of queer actors and queer subtext." Writing for The Evening Standard, Deeya Sonalkar deemed Agatha All Along to be "the queerest MCU outing by far", which she described as "a welcome change". Salon critic Kelly McClure praised the series for not falling into the pattern of queerbaiting, and highlighted Hahn and Plaza's chemistry. Variety critic Alison Herman similarly wrote, "The mood is more referential and camp-adjacent than its franchise peers. In other words, it's more gay, a style that's quickly matched with substance." The relationship between Agatha and Rio in particular has gained notable fan attention, with Schaffer confirming that they were "married in some witchy way". In addition to its queer themes, the series received praise from critics for its exploration of topics such as motherhood, community, and death, as well as its commitment to a villainous lead. Joshua Yehl of IGN opined that the series was successful in its endeavor to "intimately explore themes like the fragility of life and the inevitability of death" as it "fearlessly dives headfirst into a sea of complex ideas and explores them with such a complex, flawed, and remarkable cast of women." Writing for Vulture, Caroline Framke lauded the series' finale for depicting Agatha Harkness as a loving mother without negating her villainy or simplifying her motivations. Framke wrote: "In "Maiden, Mother, Crone," we see Agatha at each of these life stages. [...] She was not a good person, but she is a great character, and it's been a real treat to watch her story from middle, to end, to beginning, and back again."

In a mixed review, Rob Owen of The Seattle Times opined that although Hahn's "chemistry with Locke and Plaza, especially, makes Agatha watchable," the show "is not as creative as WandaVision and threatens to feature the same plot over and over, episode after episode." USA Today's Kelly Lawler criticized the series as having an uneven tone, but praised the performances and the humor, writing, "Agatha is trying to do too many things at once. Buried deep somewhere is a good horror series about Agatha's journey with real scares and perhaps a mythology that's understandable. But in true Marvel fashion, more and more stuff just keeps getting piled on the base story. [...] They [the cast] all seem to be having fun, and it can be contagious. If confusing."

=== Accolades ===
Hahn's performance was an honorable mention for TVLine's "Performer of the Week" for the week ending October 12, 2024, with Rebecca Iannucci stating, "Kathryn Hahn has one of the most formidable acting ranges in the business" and commending her for "her comedy chops [...] and her subtle dramatic skill". The website went on to feature Hahn among their 20 finalists for "Performer of the Year" in December 2024, with R. I. praising her "delicate moments: her hints of genuine longing for Rio; the glimpses of grief over her son's death; and her surprising — ill-advised, even! — protectiveness over Teen". Locke was an honorable mention on the website for the week ending October 19, 2024. Matt Webb Mitovich lauded his layered performance, writing that "Joe Locke worked all kinds of magic with the variety of material given him". LuPone received an honorable mention for the week ending October 26. Mitovich described her work as "a tour de force", and praised her character's impactful presence by concluding, "LuPone conjured every emotion."

Agatha All Along was recognized on various best-of lists. In December 2024, it ranked 15th on TVLine's "Best TV Shows of the Year", while episode "Darkest Hour / Wake Thy Power"'s reveal came in 5th on the website's "Top 30 Plot Twists" ranking. Agatha Harkness and Billy Maximoff were among the publication's "Top 20 Non-Romantic TV Duos" of 2024, with Agatha and Rio Vidal's "Seekest Thou the Road" fight scene featured as one of "The 20 Sexiest Scenes" of the year. Agatha All Along placed eighth on Screen Rant's "25 Best TV Shows of 2024" list, and was among The Guardian's "50 Best TV Shows of 2024". The series made Forbes' "Best TV Shows Of 2024" list and was among the 48 best Disney+ shows according to TechRadar. Episode 7, "Death's Hand in Mine", was included in Entertainment Weekly's list of "20 Best TV Episodes of 2024", while the penultimate episode's twist was named the publication's most shocking TV moment of 2024.

Accolades received by Agatha All Along
Award	Date of ceremony	Category	Recipient	Result	Ref.
Art Directors Guild Awards	February 15, 2025	Excellence in Production Design for a Limited Series	John Collins	Nominated	
ASCAP Composers' Choice Awards	April 30, 2025	Television Score of the Year	Michael Paraskevas	Nominated	
Astra TV Awards	June 10, 2025	Best Actress in a Comedy Series	Kathryn Hahn	Nominated	
Astra TV Awards	June 10, 2025	Best Cast Ensemble in a Streaming Comedy Series	Kathryn Hahn, Joe Locke, Sasheer Zamata, Patti LuPone, Debra Jo Rupp, Aubrey Plaza	Nominated	
Costume Designers Guild Awards	February 6, 2025	Excellence in Contemporary Television	Daniel Selon (for "Seekest Thou the Road")	Nominated	
Costume Designers Guild Awards	February 6, 2025	Excellence in Sci-Fi/Fantasy Television	Daniel Selon (for "If I Can't Reach You / Let My Song Teach You")	Nominated	
Costume Designers Guild Awards	February 6, 2025	Excellence in Costume Illustration	Imogene Chayes	Nominated	
Critics' Choice Celebration Of LGBTQ+ Cinema & Television	June 6, 2025	Breakthrough Performance	Sasheer Zamata	Won	
Critics' Choice Super Awards	August 7, 2025	Best Actress in a Superhero Series, Limited Series or Made-For-TV Movie	Kathryn Hahn	Nominated	
Critics' Choice Super Awards	August 7, 2025	Best Actress in a Science Fiction / Fantasy Series, Limited Series or Made-For-TV Movie	Kathryn Hahn	Nominated	
Critics' Choice Super Awards	August 7, 2025	Best Superhero Series, Limited Series or Made-For-TV Movie	Agatha All Along	Nominated	
Critics' Choice Television Awards	February 7, 2025	Best Supporting Actress in a Comedy Series	Patti LuPone	Nominated	
Dorian TV Awards	July 8, 2025	Best LGBTQ TV Show	Agatha All Along	Nominated	
Dorian TV Awards	July 8, 2025	Best TV Performance — Comedy	Kathryn Hahn	Nominated	
Dorian TV Awards	July 8, 2025	Best TV Musical Performance	Kathryn Hahn, Patti LuPone, Ali Ahn, Sasheer Zamata (for "The Ballad of the Witches' Road")	Nominated	
Dorian TV Awards	July 8, 2025	Best Genre TV Show	Agatha All Along	Nominated	
Dorian TV Awards	July 8, 2025	Most Visually Striking TV Show	Agatha All Along	Nominated	
GLAAD Media Awards	March 27, 2025	Outstanding New TV Series	Agatha All Along	Won	
Golden Globe Awards	January 5, 2025	Best Performance by a Female Actor in a Television Series – Musical or Comedy	Kathryn Hahn	Nominated	
Golden Tomato Awards	January 16, 2025	Best Fantasy Series	Agatha All Along	Nominated	
Golden Trailer Awards	June 30, 2025	Best Original Score (Trailer/Teaser) – TV/Streaming Series	Agatha All Along (for "The Road" trailer), Disney+, Level Up AV	Nominated	
Golden Trailer Awards	June 30, 2025	Best Animation/Family TV Spot – TV/Streaming Series	Agatha All Along, 30TV "Damage", Disney+, Level Up AV	Nominated	
Golden Trailer Awards	June 30, 2025	Best Comedy/Drama TrailerByte (TV/Streaming Series)	Agatha All Along (for "Gather Your Coven"), Walt Disney Studios, Tiny Hero	Nominated	
Golden Trailer Awards	June 30, 2025	Best Comedy/Drama TrailerByte (TV/Streaming Series)	Agatha All Along (for "POV YOU’RE A 350 YEAR OLD WITCH"), Disney, Intermission Film	Nominated	
Golden Trailer Awards	June 30, 2025	Best BTS/EPK for a TV/Streaming Series (Under 2minutes)	Agatha All Along (for "Practical Magic"), Walt Disney Studios, Tiny Hero	Nominated	
Gracie Awards	May 20, 2025	Director – Fantasy	Jac Schaeffer	Won	
Hugo Awards	August 16, 2025	Best Dramatic Presentation, Short Form	Gia King, Cameron Squires, Jac Schaeffer (for "Death's Hand in Mine")	Nominated	
ICG Publicists Awards	February 28, 2025	Maxwell Weinberg Award For Television Publicity Campaign	Agatha All Along	Won	
Independent Spirit Awards	February 22, 2025	Best Lead Performance in a New Scripted Series	Kathryn Hahn	Nominated	
Independent Spirit Awards	February 22, 2025	Best Breakthrough Performance In A New Scripted Series	Joe Locke	Nominated	
Independent Spirit Awards	February 22, 2025	Best Supporting Performance in a New Scripted Series	Patti LuPone	Nominated	
MacGuffin Awards	September 13, 2025	Television Mini-Series	Russell Bobbitt and Jim Stubblefield	Nominated	
Make-Up Artists & Hair Stylists Guild Awards	February 15, 2025	Best Period and/or Character Make-Up	Vasilios Tanis, Erin LeBre, Tana Medina, Amanda Sprunger, and Addison Foreman	Nominated	
Music Supervisors Guild Awards	February 23, 2025	Best Song Written and/or Recorded for Television	Kristen Anderson-Lopez, Robert Lopez, Ali Ahn, Kathryn Hahn, Patti LuPone, Debra Jo Rupp, Sasheer Zamata, Dave Jordan, and Justine von Winterfeldt (for "The Ballad of the Witches' Road (Sacred Chant Version)")	Won	
Primetime Creative Arts Emmy Awards	September 14, 2025	Outstanding Fantasy/Sci-Fi Costumes	Daniel Selon, Ambre Wrigley, Maddison Carroll, Marilyn Madsen, Greg Hopwood (for "Follow Me My Friend / To Glory at the End")	Nominated	
Primetime Creative Arts Emmy Awards	September 14, 2025	Outstanding Original Music and Lyrics	Kristen Anderson-Lopez, Robert Lopez (for "The Ballad of the Witches' Road")	Nominated	
Primetime Creative Arts Emmy Awards	September 14, 2025	Outstanding Sound Editing for a Comedy or Drama Series (Half-Hour)	Kim Foscato, Paula Fairfield, Richard Gould, Daniel Laurie, Jacob Riehle, Andre J.H. Zweers, Kim B. Christensen, Fernand Bos, Mary Parker, Jana Vance, Ronni Brown (for "Darkest Hour / Wake Thy Power")	Nominated	
Queerties Awards	March 11, 2025	TV Comedy	Agatha All Along	Runner-up	
Queerties Awards	March 11, 2025	TV Performance	Aubrey Plaza	Won	
ReFrame Stamp	August 20, 2025	—N/a	Agatha All Along	Won	
Saturn Awards	February 2, 2025	Best Superhero Television Series	Agatha All Along	Won	
Saturn Awards	February 2, 2025	Best Actress in a Television Series	Kathryn Hahn	Nominated	
Saturn Awards	February 2, 2025	Best Guest Star in a Television Series	Aubrey Plaza	Nominated	
Saturn Awards	February 2, 2025	Best Younger Performer in a Television Series	Joe Locke	Nominated	
Shorty Awards	May 22, 2025	Best Digital Campaign	Agatha All Along	Runner-up	
TCA Awards	August 20, 2025	Outstanding Achievement in Movies, Miniseries or Specials	Agatha All Along	Nominated	
Tell-Tale TV Awards	June 4, 2025	Favorite Limited Series	Agatha All Along	Won	
Tell-Tale TV Awards	June 4, 2025	Favorite Performer in a Limited Series	Kathryn Hahn	Won	
Tell-Tale TV Awards	June 4, 2025	Favorite Performer in a Limited Series	Aubrey Plaza	Runner-up	

By November 2024, Marvel Studios and Disney had decided to submit the series for award consideration in comedy series categories, rather than in limited series categories, including for the Golden Globes, Screen Actors Guild Awards, and Primetime Emmy Awards. Clayton Davis of Variety opined that this decision indicated future seasons of the series could be made.

== Documentary special ==
In February 2021, the documentary series Marvel Studios: Assembled was announced. The special on this series, "The Making of Agatha All Along", was released on Marvel Entertainment's YouTube channel on November 13, 2024.

== Future ==
Agatha All Along is the second entry in a trilogy alongside WandaVision and the miniseries VisionQuest (2026). Hahn has expressed interest in reprising her role, saying "I think everyone would be thrilled to come back [...] in any capacity." In February 2025, Winderbaum said Marvel Studios wanted to make a second season of Agatha All Along but emphasized prioritizing a strong story over rushing production.
