= Miles Gutierrez-Riley =

American actor (born 1998)

- Born: September 17, 1998 (age 28); Long Beach, California, U.S.
- Education: Fordham University
- Occupation: Actor
- Years active: 2022–present

Miles Gutierrez-Riley (born September 17, 1998) is an American actor who is best known for his roles as Ivan Taylor in the Amazon Prime series The Wilds, as well as Joshua in the film Smile 2 (2024), and Eddie in the Disney+ series Agatha All Along (2024).

== Early life and education ==
Gutierrez-Riley was born on September 17, 1998 in Long Beach, California. Gutierrez-Riley graduated from Fordham University with a BA in Theatre Performance where he was the recipient of the Denzel Washington Scholarship.

== Career ==
Gutierrez-Riley made his screen debut in the main cast of the second season of the Amazon Prime series The Wilds. His performance received rave reviews, with RogerEbert.com calling Gutierrez-Riley a "stand-out" and "future star" amongst the large cast. TV Guide praised his performance as "tremendous."

His film debut came in September 2022, with a supporting role in Paramount's film adaptation of On the Come Up, based on the novel of the same name by Angie Thomas.

In 2024, Gutierrez-Riley starred as Nathan in fellow Fordham alum Tommy Dorfman's I Wish You All the Best opposite Corey Fogelmanis. The film premiered at SXSW. He then appeared in Smile 2, directed by Parker Finn, which saw a #1 box office debut, and the Max romantic comedy Sweethearts. Gutierrez-Riley also featured as Eddie in the Disney+ series Agatha All Along, playing one of the first LGBTQ+ characters in the Marvel Cinematic Universe (MCU), opposite Joe Locke.

Gutierrez-Riley was named one of Essence’s 20 Young Black Hollywood Stars To Watch In 2022.

== Personal life ==
Gutierrez-Riley is openly gay.

== Filmography ==
=== Film ===
Year	Title	Role	Notes
2022	On The Come Up	Sonny	
2022	The Moon and Back	Simon	
2024	I Wish You All the Best	Nathan	Main cast
2024	Smile 2	Joshua	
2024	Sweethearts	Lukas	
2026	Gail Daughtry and the Celebrity Sex Pass	Otto	Main cast
2026	That Friend	Spencer	

=== Television ===
Year	Title	Role	Notes
2022	The Wilds	Ivan Taylor	Main cast
2024	Agatha All Along	Eddie	Episode: "Familiar by Thy Side"
2026	Off Campus	Dexter	Recurring; 6 Episodes
