= The Ballad of the Witches' Road =

2024 song from the miniseries Agatha All Along

"The Ballad of the Witches' Road" (Sacred Chant Version)
- Promotional graphic

Single by Kathryn Hahn, Sasheer Zamata, Ali Ahn, Patti LuPone, Debra Jo Rupp and Agatha All Along cast
- Released: September 19, 2024
- Length: 3:18
- Label: Marvel Music; Hollywood
- Songwriters: Kristen Anderson-Lopez; Robert Lopez
- Producers: Kristen Anderson-Lopez; Robert Lopez

Music videos
- "Sacred Chant Version" on YouTube
- "True Crime Version" on YouTube
- "Lorna Wu's Version" on YouTube
- "Cover Version" on YouTube
- "Score Version" on YouTube
- "Nicky's Version" on YouTube
- "Agatha Through Time Version" on YouTube
- "Pop Version" on YouTube

"The Ballad of the Witches' Road" is a song from the Marvel Studios Disney+ television miniseries Agatha All Along, written by composers Kristen Anderson-Lopez and Robert Lopez. Eight versions of the song were used throughout the series; the main version is referred to as the "Sacred Chant Version".

== Background and production ==
In January 2023, Kathryn Hahn hinted that the Marvel Cinematic Universe MCU) television miniseries Agatha All Along (2024) would include original songs similar to those featured in WandaVision (2021) such as "Agatha All Along". In March, Christophe Beck revealed that he would be returning from WandaVision and other MCU media to compose the score for the Disney+ series. The following month, Kristen Anderson-Lopez and Robert Lopez were revealed to have written the series' original songs, also returning from WandaVision. Hahn serves as the lead singer for some songs, with the other witch actors such as Patti LuPone acting as background singers. Anderson-Lopez and Lopez were told about the plot twist that ties the song to Nicholas Scratch and all of the variations of the song that the episodes would include, plus they wrote a proto-melody of it for Nicholas' actor Abel Lysenko to hum it to explain the origin story of the song and show that he is finding it once the series finale "Maiden Mother Crone" reveals how the song was made. The lyrics shifted during the making process, having many versions as the melody iterated. Jac Schaeffer wanted to work with the composers to find a way to weave whatever songs they came up with into the series' narrative. One of their songs, "The Ballad of the Witches' Road", became an ancient tune in the series that all witches are familiar with. In September 2024, Michael Paraskevas was revealed to have composed the score with Beck, after previously working together in the MCU series Hawkeye (2021). Hahn and her co-stars performed "The Ballad of the Witches' Road" at the D23 fan event in August 2024, where the series trailer was revealed.

== Release history and versions ==
The True Crime Version and the Sacred Chant Version were released on September 19, 2024, as part of Songs from Agatha All Along (Episodes 1 & 2). The Lorna Wu's Version and the Cover Version were released on October 3, 2024, as part of Songs from Agatha All Along (Episode 4). The Score Version along with True Crime, Sacred Chant, Lorna Wu's, and Cover versions were released together on October 11, as part of Agatha All Along: Vol. 1 (Episodes 1–5) (Original Soundtrack). The Pop Version by Japanese Breakfast was released on October 17. The Nicky's Version and the Agatha Through Time Version were released on October 31, as part of Songs from Agatha All Along (Episode 9). Nicky's, Agatha Through Time and Pop versions were released together on November 1, 2024, as part of Agatha All Along: Vol. 2 (Episodes 6–9) (Original Soundtrack). All eight versions of the song were featured on the side A of the soundtrack vinyl, Music from Agatha All Along, released on October 30, 2024.

All tracks are written by Kristen Anderson-Lopez and Robert Lopez.

Versions of "The Ballad of the Witches' Road"
No.	Title	Initially released	Length
1.	"The Ballad of the Witches' Road (True Crime Version)" (featuring Matthew Mayfield)	September 19, 2024	1:43
2.	"The Ballad of the Witches' Road (Sacred Chant Version)" (featuring Kathryn Hahn, Sasheer Zamata, Ali Ahn, Patti LuPone and Debra Jo Rupp)	September 19, 2024	3:18
3.	"The Ballad of the Witches' Road (Lorna Wu's Version)" (featuring Seomoon Tak)	October 3, 2024	4:41
4.	"The Ballad of the Witches' Road (Cover Version)" (featuring Kathryn Hahn, Sasheer Zamata, Ali Ahn, Patti LuPone, Aubrey Plaza and Joe Locke)	October 3, 2024	4:40
5.	"The Ballad of the Witches' Road (Score Version)"	October 11, 2024	1:42
6.	"The Ballad of the Witches' Road (Nicky's Version)"	October 31, 2024	0:49
7.	"The Ballad of the Witches' Road (Agatha Through Time Version)" (featuring Kathryn Hahn, Sasheer Zamata, Ali Ahn, and Patti LuPone)	October 31, 2024	2:36
8.	"The Ballad of the Witches' Road (Pop Version)" (featuring Japanese Breakfast)	October 17, 2024	4:41
Total length:			24:10

=== "True Crime Version" ===
The "True Crime Version" was featured in the first episode of Agatha All Along titled "Seekest Thou the Road". It was the theme song for the fictionalized crime noir television series titled Agnes of Westview, in which the witch Agatha Harkness was trapped by Wanda Maximoff / Scarlet Witch in the town of Westview, New Jersey, at the end of the miniseries WandaVision (2021).

=== "Sacred Chant Version" ===
The "Sacred Chant Version" was featured in the second episode of Agatha All Along titled "Circle Sewn with Fate / Unlock Thy Hidden Gate". It was sung by Harkness and her newly recruited coven, during which Billy Maximoff unknowingly created the Witches' Road, accessible via a door in Agatha's basement in her home in Westview.

=== "Lorna Wu's Version" ===
The "Lorna Wu's Version" was featured in the fourth episode of Agatha All Along titled "If I Can't Reach You / Let My Song Teach You". It was sung by the character Lorna Wu, mother of Alice Wu-Gulliver, a member of Harkness' coven, and revealed to be a protection spell created by Wu to shield Wu-Gulliver from a generational curse.

=== "Cover Version" ===
The "Cover Version" was featured in "If I Can't Reach You / Let My Song Teach You". It was sung by Harkness' coven, during Wu-Gulliver's trial as a cover of Lorna Wu's version in the hopes of protecting themselves from the Wu family generational curse.

=== "Score Version" ===
The "Score Version" was featured in "Circle Sewn with Fate / Unlock Thy Hidden Gate" and was composed by Christophe Beck and Michael Paraskevas. The score plays in the final scene as the coven walks down the path of the Witches' Road after entering the door and narrowly escaping the Salem Seven.

=== "Nicky's Version" ===
The "Nicky's Version" was featured in the finale of Agatha All Along titled "Maiden Mother Crone". It was the initial version of the song, as developed by Harkness and her son Nicholas Scratch in the 1750s which started the legend of the Witches' Road.

=== "Agatha Through Time Version" ===
The "Agatha Through Time Version" was featured in "Maiden Mother Crone". It was the version of the song continued by Harkness after the death of her son, which she used to con other witches by leading them in singing the song as part of a ritual to open the door to the Witches' Road and proceeding to steal their powers, killing them in the process. Harkness eventually became the only known survivor of the fictional Witches' Road.

=== "Pop Version" ===
The "Pop Version", performed by Japanese Breakfast, was featured in the credits of "Maiden Mother Crone".

== Chart performance ==
The Sacred Chant Version debuted at number twenty-two on the Billboard Digital Song Sales chart for the week of October 5, 2024.

Chart performance for the Sacred Chant Version
Chart (2024)	Peak position
UK Singles (OCC)	45
US Digital Songs (Billboard)	22

== Reception ==
=== Critical response ===
"The Ballad of the Witches' Road" was widely praised for its narrative significance, emotional depth, and the unexpected plot twist surrounding its origin. Vulture's Caroline Framke described the "Sacred Chant Version" as "an earworm of a song" that was "undeniably effective to juxtapose the coven's singalong with the arrival of the shrouded Salem 7", but noted it was not "as meme-ably catchy" as "Agatha All Along". IGN critic Joshua Yehl called the "Cover Version" "wonderfully campy" and "great", and praised the lyrical elements that tied into Alice Wu-Gulliver's story. Writing for Tell-Tale TV, Misael Duran found the "Agatha Through Time Version" to be a "major highlight" and "beautifully haunting", while The Ringer's Daniel Chin praised the plot twist regarding the origins of the song.

=== Accolades ===
In 2025, "The Ballad of the Witches' Road (Sacred Chant Version)" won the Music Supervisors Guild Award for Best Song Written and/or Recorded for Television. The song was also nominated for a Primetime Creative Arts Emmy Award for Outstanding Original Music and Lyrics, and a Dorian TV Award for Best TV Musical Performance.
