= Kristen Anderson-Lopez =

American songwriter (born 1972)

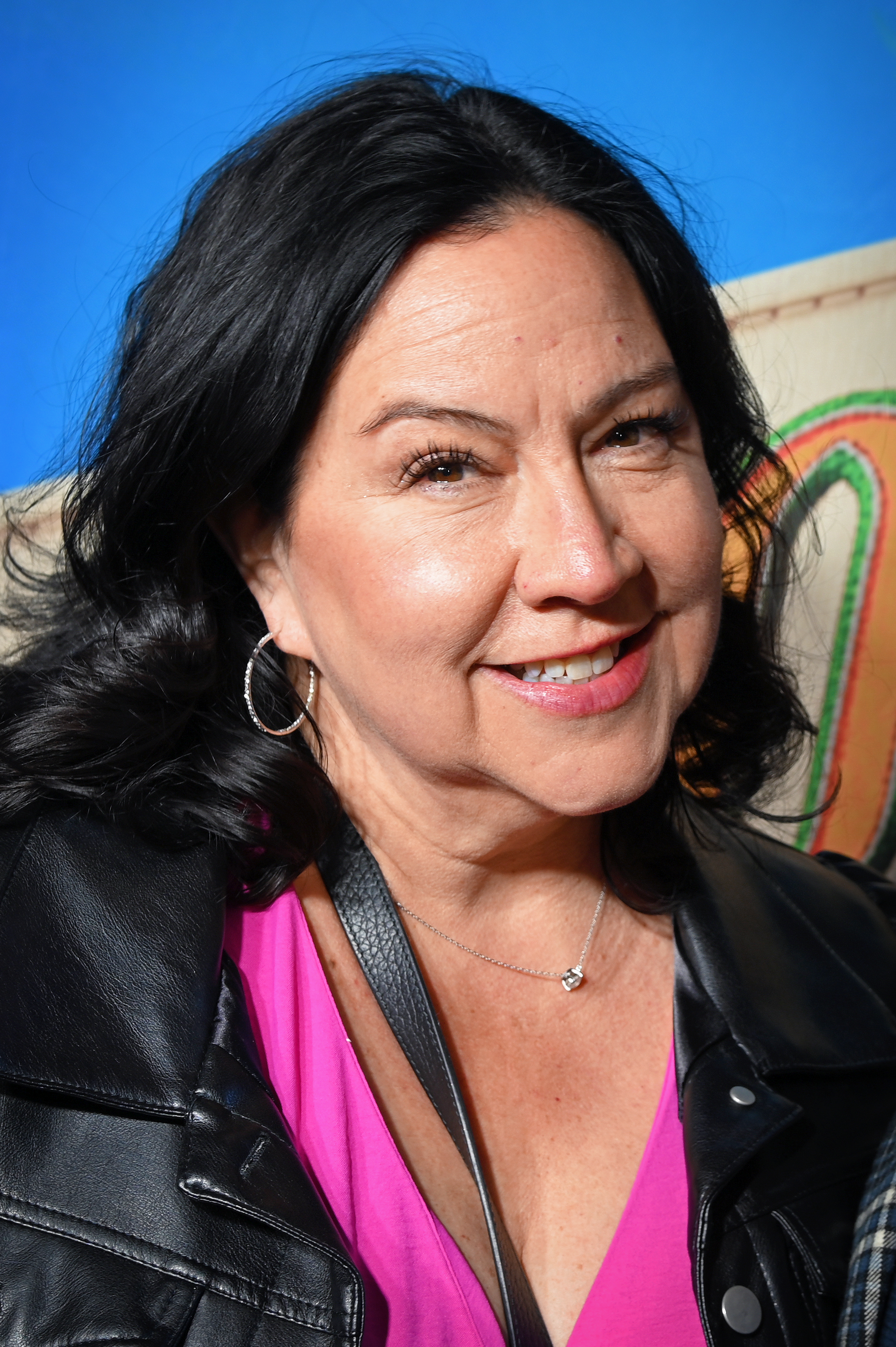
- Anderson-Lopez in 2026
- Born: Kristen Anderson; March 21, 1972 (age 54); New York City, U.S.
- Education: Williams College (BA)
- Occupation: Songwriter
- Spouse: Robert Lopez (m. 2003)
- Children: 2
- Awards: 2014: Academy Award for Best Original Song; 2015: Grammy Award for Best Song Written for Visual Media; 2015: Grammy Award for Best Compilation Soundtrack for Visual Media; 2018: Academy Award for Best Original Song; 2021: Primetime Emmy Award for Outstanding Original Music and Lyrics

Kristen Anderson-Lopez (born March 21, 1972) is an American songwriter. She is known for co-writing the songs for the 2013 animated musical film Frozen and its 2019 sequel Frozen 2 with her husband Robert Lopez. The couple won the Academy Award for Best Original Song for "Let It Go" from Frozen and "Remember Me" from Coco (2017) at the 86th and 90th awards respectively. She also won two Grammy Awards at the 57th Annual Grammy Awards, and she is signed to Disney Music Publishing.

== Personal life ==
Anderson-Lopez was raised in Croton-on-Hudson, New York (a suburb of New York City), until 1986; the Myers Park neighborhood of Charlotte, North Carolina, from 1986 to 1990; and Waxhaw, North Carolina (a suburb of Charlotte), from 1990 onward (which was her home during her college years). Her parents, Erin and John, still live in Waxhaw. According to her father, Anderson-Lopez first fell in love with the theater at the age of four, when he took her to see a U.S. Bicentennial musical tribute staged in their then-hometown of Croton-on-Hudson. After her family moved to North Carolina, she attended and graduated from Charlotte Country Day School. She went on to Williams College in western Massachusetts, where she double-majored in drama and psychology and graduated in 1994. After a theater internship in Florida, Anderson-Lopez spent several years working temporary jobs while pursuing her dream of becoming a Broadway theatre performer in New York City. In 1999, she entered the BMI Lehman Engel Musical Theatre Workshop and found her true calling as a lyricist, and also met her future husband Robert Lopez.

In October 2003, Anderson married Lopez, who would go on to become an EGOT-winning songwriter, composer and lyricist, including three Tony Awards for Avenue Q and The Book of Mormon. They have two daughters; Katie and Annie, who both had voice parts in Frozen.

Anderson-Lopez's sister, Kate Anderson, co-wrote the songs for Olaf's Frozen Adventure.

== Stage productions ==
In 2006, Anderson-Lopez and her husband wrote the songs for the Walt Disney World production of Finding Nemo – The Musical.

Anderson-Lopez is the co-creator of the musical In Transit, developed at the O'Neill Musical Theatre Conference. The musical ran Off-Broadway at the 59E59 Theatre, from September 21, 2010, to October 30, 2010. The production received the 2011 Drama Desk Award for Outstanding Ensemble, as well as a nomination for the 2011 Lucille Lortel Award, Outstanding Musical (among others) and the 2011 Outer Critics Circle Award for Outstanding New Off-Broadway Musical. It opened on Broadway at the Circle in the Square Theatre in November 2016, directed and choreographed by Kathleen Marshall.

She co-created the romantic stage musical Up Here, which debuted in 2015, with her husband and Alex Timbers.

Her work for young audiences includes numerous short and full-length musical adaptations for Theatreworks USA (Diary of a Worm, Fancy Nancy, Condensed Classics).

Anderson-Lopez worked with her husband on the Disney Theatrical Productions stage musical adaptation of Frozen, with Jennifer Lee writing the book.

== Film and television productions ==
Anderson-Lopez's first collaborations with her husband involved writing several songs together for children's televisions shows, such as Wonder Pets on Nick Jr. and Bear in the Big Blue House on the Disney Channel.

Anderson-Lopez, along with her husband Robert Lopez and Henry Jackman, wrote and produced music for the 2011 Disney film Winnie the Pooh, for which they were nominated for an Annie Award for Best Music in a Feature Production. She also provided the voice of Kanga in the film.

Her work with her husband writing songs for the 2013 Disney film Frozen, including "Let It Go", won her an Academy Award for Best Original Song at the 86th Academy Awards and two Grammy Awards at the 57th Annual Grammy Awards. Anderson-Lopez and her husband also wrote the music for the sequel, Frozen II.

Anderson-Lopez and Robert Lopez again collaborated in writing songs and lyrics for the 2017 Pixar film Coco, for which she won for an Annie Award for Music in a Feature Production. She also won an Academy Award for Best Original Song for the song "Remember Me" at the 90th Academy Awards.

Kristen Anderson-Lopez sings Elsa’s part in “I Seek the Truth”, an outtake song of the Frozen II soundtrack, along with Patti Murin singing Anna’s part. Murin had originated the role of Anna in the Broadway production of Frozen.

Anderson-Lopez and her husband wrote and produced music for the 2021 series WandaVision, set in the Marvel Cinematic Universe. The series features multiple title theme songs based on various classic American sitcoms, as well as the song "Agatha All Along". In 2024, Anderson-Lopez and her husband returned to write multiple versions of "The Ballad of the Witches’ Road" for the WandaVision spin-off Agatha All Along. In 2026, the pair wrote "Don't Kill the World" for VisionQuest, the final installment of the WandaVision trilogy.

Frozen III will have songs written by herself and Robert Lopez, and she is set to be voicing a new character. The third full-length instalment of the Frozen franchise is set to be released in November 2027.

== Awards and nominations ==
=== Academy Awards ===
Year	Category	Nominated work	Result	Ref.
2013	Best Original Song	"Let It Go" (from Frozen)	Won	
2017	Best Original Song	"Remember Me" (from Coco)	Won	
2019	Best Original Song	"Into the Unknown" (from Frozen 2)	Nominated	

=== Annie Awards ===
Year	Category	Nominated work	Result	Ref.
2011	Music in a Feature Production	Winnie the Pooh	Nominated	
2013	Outstanding Achievement for Music in a Feature Production	Frozen	Won	
2017	Outstanding Achievement for Music in a Feature Production	Coco	Won	
2019	Outstanding Achievement for Music in a Feature Production	Frozen 2	Nominated	

=== Critics' Choice Movie Awards ===
Year	Category	Nominated work	Result	Ref.
2013	Best Original Song	"Let It Go" (from Frozen)	Won	
2017	Best Original Song	"Remember Me" (from Coco)	Won	
2019	Best Original Song	"Into the Unknown" (from Frozen II)	Nominated	

=== Emmy Awards ===
Primetime Emmy Awards
Year	Category	Nominated work	Result	Ref.
2015	Outstanding Original Music and Lyrics	"Kiss an Old Man" (from The Comedians) (Episode: "Celebrity Guest")	Nominated	
2015	Outstanding Original Music and Lyrics	"Moving Pictures" (from The Oscars)	Nominated	
2021	Outstanding Original Main Title Theme Music	WandaVision	Nominated	
2021	Outstanding Original Music and Lyrics	"Agatha All Along" (from WandaVision) (Episode: "Breaking the Fourth Wall")	Won	
2025	Outstanding Original Music and Lyrics	"The Ballad of the Witches' Road" (from Agatha All Along) (Episode: "Circle Sewn with Fate / Unlock Thy Hidden Gate")	Nominated	
Children's and Family Emmy Awards
2022	Outstanding Short Form Program	We the People	Won	

=== Golden Globe Awards ===
Year	Category	Nominated work	Result	Ref.
2013	Best Original Song	"Let It Go" (from Frozen)	Nominated	
2017	Best Original Song	"Remember Me" (from Coco)	Nominated	
2019	Best Original Song	"Into the Unknown" (from Frozen 2)	Nominated	

=== Grammy Awards ===
Year	Category	Nominated work	Result	Ref.
2014	Best Compilation Soundtrack for Visual Media	Frozen	Won	
2014	Best Song Written for Visual Media	"Let It Go" (from Frozen)	Won	
2018	Best Song Written for Visual Media	"Remember Me" (from Coco)	Nominated	
2020	Best Compilation Soundtrack for Visual Media	Frozen 2	Nominated	
2020	Best Song Written for Visual Media	"Into the Unknown" (from Frozen 2)	Nominated	
2021	Best Song Written for Visual Media	"Agatha All Along" (from WandaVision)	Nominated	

=== Tony Awards ===
Year	Category	Nominated work	Result	Ref.
2018	Best Original Score	Frozen	Nominated	
