= Ali Ahn =

American actress (born 1980 or 1981)

- 안명진
- Pronunciation: An Myeongjin
- Born: 1980 or 1981 (age 44–45)
- Education: Yale University (BA); California Institute of the Arts (MFA)
- Occupation: actress
- Years active: 2010–present

Ali Ahn (born 1980 or 1981) is an American actress. She has appeared in TV series such as Billions, Orange Is the New Black, Raising Dion, The Diplomat, and Agatha All Along.

== Early life and education ==
Ahn grew up in Pasadena, California, and is of Korean descent. She is a 1999 graduate of Polytechnic School in Pasadena. Ahn then attended Yale University, where she graduated magna cum laude in 2003 with a bachelor's degree in dance and theater, and received an MFA in acting from the California Institute of the Arts in 2006.

== Career ==
In New York theater, Ahn made her Broadway debut in a short-lived revival of The Heidi Chronicles opposite Elisabeth Moss in February–May 2015. She starred off-Broadway in Rajiv Joseph's Letters of Suresh at the Tony Kiser Theater in September–October 2021. A Times review said that her "messy charisma" elevated the play's letter-writing conceit.

In television, Ahn played recurring characters in the series Billions (2016–2018) and Orange Is the New Black (2018). She played biotechnology company CEO Suzanne Wu on the Netflix superhero show Raising Dion (2019–2022), a role that was promoted to series regular in season two. She played another Netflix main role, Central Intelligence Agency (CIA) station chief Eidra Park, in the drama series The Diplomat (2023–present). In 2024, Ahn starred as Alice Wu-Gulliver in the Disney+ Marvel Cinematic Universe show Agatha All Along.

== Personal life ==
Ahn is in a relationship with actor William Jackson Harper, who co-starred with her in an outdoor production of Romeo + Juliet in New York in 2012.

== Filmography ==
=== Film ===
| Year(s) | Title | Role | Notes |
|---|---|---|---|
| 2010 | H.M.S.: White Coat | Autum | Television film |
| 2012 | Liberal Arts | Vanessa | |
| 2015 | The Girl in the Book | Sadie | |
| 2017 | Landline | Sandra | |
| 2017 | Lost Cat Corona | Edie | |
| 2018 | Hammerhead | Robin | Television film |
| 2019 | Lucky Grandma | Lynn | |
| 2019 | Anya | Libby | |
| 2020 | The Scottish Play | Lauren | |
| 2026 | Take Me Home | Emily | |

=== Television ===
| Year(s) | Title | Role | Notes |
|---|---|---|---|
| 2010 | Ugly Betty | Fiona | Episode: "Chica and the Man" |
| 2010 | Law & Order: Special Victims Unit | Tess Chang | Episode: "Bullseye" |
| 2011 | Louie | Wanda | Episode: "Halloween/Ellie" |
| 2013 | White Collar | Agent Watson | 2 episodes |
| 2013 | Zero Hour | Emily | Episode: "Suspension" |
| 2013 | Blue Bloods | Ella Ryu | Episode: "Drawing Dead" |
| 2014 | Black Box | Tinker | 5 episodes |
| 2015 | Nurse Jackie | Young Administrator | Episode: "Managed Care" |
| 2015 | Odd Mom Out | Jillian | 4 episodes |
| 2015 | Benders | Angie | Episode: "Secrets and Lies" |
| 2016–2018 | The Path | Nicole | Recurring role; 27 episodes |
| 2016–2018 | Billions | Carly | 6 episodes |
| 2017 | The Breaks | Josie Cho | 8 episodes |
| 2017 | Supernatural | Dagon | 3 episodes |
| 2018 | Orange Is the New Black | Agent Nguyen | 3 episodes |
| 2019–2022 | Raising Dion | Suzanne Wu | Main role (recurring in season 1); 16 episodes |
| 2019–2023 | The Other Two | Jo | 4 episodes |
| 2020 | Social Distance | Anne-Marie | Miniseries; 1 episode |
| 2020 | The Non-Essentials | Neighbor Girl | Miniseries; episode: "Sourdough" |
| 2020 | Next | Sarina | Recurring role; 7 episodes |
| 2022 | Little Demon | Arabella, Mabel, Lilith (voices) | Recurring role; 4 episodes |
| 2023–present | The Diplomat | Eidra Park | Main role; 22 episodes |
| 2024 | Agatha All Along | Alice Wu-Gulliver | Main role; 7 episodes; also contributed to soundtrack |
