= Tell-Tale TV =

American entertainment news website

- Website type: Television
- Available in: English
- Owners: Bissette Media, LLC
- Website: telltaletv.com
- Commercial: Yes
- Launched: 2014
- Current status: Online

Tell-Tale TV is an American entertainment news website dedicated to the coverage of television-related news, discussion, reviews and criticism.

== History ==
Tell-Tale TV was founded in 2014 as "a TV-focused website dedicated to offering insightful episodic reviews of a variety of television shows." It also provides previews, news, in-depth interviews, and other analytical pieces. It is a Rotten Tomatoes approved publication.

The editor-in-chief, Ashley Bissette Sumerel, is a member of the Critics Choice Association.

In 2015, Tell-Tale TV began offering video content and reviews on their official YouTube channel.

== Tell-Tale TV Awards ==
The Tell-Tale TV Awards are an annual awards ceremony held by Tell-Tale TV, celebrating popular television series and performers of the year. Similar to the People's Choice Awards, nominees in eighteen categories are chosen by the editors and the public, and voting is conducted over three consecutive rounds of public polling until a winner is chosen.

Categories include Favorite New Comedy Series, Favorite Network Drama Series, Favorite Cable or Streaming Sci-fi/Fantasy Series, Favorite TV Movie, Favorite Animated Series, and more.

The Tell-Tale TV Awards often highlight franchises currently rising in popularity. Many nominees have gone on to secure nominations for Emmy Awards and Critics Choice Awards in their respective categories for that year.
