= Death's Hand in Mine =

- Agatha All Along episode
- Promotional poster for Agatha All Along, highlighting elements seen in this episode
- Episode no.: Episode 7
- Directed by: Jac Schaeffer
- Written by: Gia King; Cameron Squires
- Cinematography by: Jon Chema; Caleb Heymann
- Editing by: David Egan
- Original release date: October 23, 2024
- Running time: 36 minutes

Cast
- Chloe Camp as young Lilia Calderu; Laura Boccaletti as Lilia's maestra; Okwui Okpokwasili as Vertigo

Episode chronology
← Previous "Familiar by Thy Side"	Next → "Follow Me My Friend / To Glory at the End"

"Death's Hand in Mine" is the seventh episode of the American television miniseries Agatha All Along, based on Marvel Comics featuring the character Agatha Harkness. It follows Harkness, who has been stripped of her identity after the events of the miniseries WandaVision (2021), and her coven as they continue their journey down the Witches' Road in search of power. The episode is set in the Marvel Cinematic Universe (MCU), sharing continuity with the films of the franchise. It was written by Gia King and Cameron Squires and directed by Agatha All Along showrunner Jac Schaeffer.

The episode focuses on the fourth trial of the Witches' Road, presenting a test for Lilia Calderu (Patti LuPone), the coven's divination witch who navigates her life out of sequence. Apart from LuPone, Kathryn Hahn reprises her roles as Harkness from the WandaVision miniseries, with Joe Locke, Sasheer Zamata, Ali Ahn, Debra Jo Rupp, and Aubrey Plaza also starring. Filming took place in the Atlanta metropolitan area and in Los Angeles.

"Death's Hand in Mine" was released on the streaming service Disney+ on October 23, 2024. Critics praised the episode for LuPone's performance, its writing, and for its progression of the series' storylines, some calling it the series' best episode yet. The episode earned a Hugo Award nomination for Best Dramatic Presentation and was included in Entertainment Weekly's list of "20 Best TV Episodes of 2024." Disney reported that the episode drove 4.2 million views globally after just one day of streaming.

== Plot ==
A distraught Lilia Calderu falls through a black void.

On the Witches' Road, Billy Maximoff questions Agatha Harkness about the death of Wanda Maximoff, growing suspicious about whether Harkness has ever been to the Road like she claims she has. Coming across and entering a castle, the two are garbed as witch characters from classic fairy tales, and are presented with the next trial: a tarot reading table. Both Billy and Harkness attempt reading for each other, but each time they draw a wrong card, a sword falls from the ceiling.

In the tunnels underneath the Road, Calderu and Jennifer Kale follow a path that Kale insists Calderu suggested. Despite Calderu's lack of memory about it, Kale recounts all she claims to have learned from her minutes ago. Calderu explains the reason behind her chaotic utterances and memory lapses—since childhood, she has been experiencing life out of order due to her mind shifting through different points within her own timeline. One of the shifts brings Calderu to her first lesson in divination where her maestra laments Calderu's lack of confidence in her powers developed when Calderu foresaw her first coven's demise, but failed to prevent it.

Flashing forward to when she and Kale are with Billy and Harkness at the trial, Calderu attempts reading for Billy, but swords keep falling. Back to her divination lesson, Calderu's maestra encourages her to believe in the purpose of her abilities, making Calderu realize what falling through the void meant.

Finding herself at the beginning of their journey in the tunnels, Calderu tells Kale all the information she would—chronologically later—claim to know from her. Evading the Salem Seven, they set off to join Harkness and Billy for the trial. Flashing forward to the castle, Calderu realizes she needs to perform the reading for herself. Completing the reading, she passes the trial and reveals that Rio Vidal is the personification of Death and that Harkness knew. Calderu urges everyone to flee, and stays behind herself despite Kale's pleas. As the Seven ambush her, Calderu flips the Tower card upright from her reading, reversing gravity in the castle and impaling the Seven. Calderu lets go and presumably falls to her death.

In the last scene, a young Calderu gleefully joins her maestra for her first lesson in divination.

== Production ==
=== Development ===
In May 2021, Jac Schaeffer, the head writer of WandaVision, signed a three-year overall television deal with Marvel Studios and 20th Television to create new projects for their Disney+ lineup. In pitches for several different projects focused on various characters, Schaeffer consistently suggested including WandaVision character Agatha Harkness, a powerful witch from Marvel Comics, as part of those series. This led to her and Marvel Studios president Kevin Feige pursuing a series centered on that character instead. By October 2021, a "dark comedy" spin-off from WandaVision centered on Kathryn Hahn as Agatha was in early development for Disney+ from Marvel Studios, with Schaeffer returning as head writer and executive producer.

During a Disney+ Day event in November 2021, the series was officially announced, with Schaeffer revealed to be directing episodes of the series a year later. By October 2023, Marvel Studios was changing its approach to television, hiring more traditional showrunners instead of head writers. Schaeffer was being credited as the series' showrunner by July 2024. Marvel Studios' Feige, Louis D'Esposito, Winderbaum and Mary Livanos served as executive producers. Released under Marvel Studios' Marvel Television label, Agatha All Along was later announced to be second in a trilogy of series that includes WandaVision and VisionQuest (2026).

=== Writing ===
According to Schaeffer, it was an early idea to create an episode of Agatha All Along which would be told non-linearly, drawing inspiration from various films and television series such as Memento (2000), Lost (2004–2010), Arrival (2016) and Everything Everywhere All at Once (2022). Recognizing that its subject matter would make the episode difficult to write, she chose two writers for the episode, including WandaVision screenwriter Cameron Squires and writer's assistant Gia King, whom she praised as a "gangbusters team". With Lilia Calderu, the episode's central character, envisioned as a fortune teller capable of slipping in and out of different points within her own lifetime, Squires and King were tasked with sprinkling bread crumbs in earlier episodes aside from outlining "Death's Hand in Mine". Schaeffer would call these seemingly blurted out non sequiturs "Lilia's bops". The pair wrote pieces separately along a linear timeline, which were subsequently combined and expanded upon in the writers' room.

=== Casting ===
The episode stars Kathryn Hahn as Agatha Harkness, Joe Locke as Billy Maximoff, Patti LuPone as Lilia Calderu, Sasheer Zamata as Jennifer Kale, Aubrey Plaza as Rio Vidal, and Ali Ahn as Alice Wu-Gulliver. Among all main cast members, LuPone was the last to be cast in December 2022. Miriam Margolyes had previously turned down her role because she did not want to film in Georgia. Chloe Camp appears in a supporting role as a younger version of Calderu, while Laura Boccaletti portrays Calderu's Maestra in several flashback sequences. The Salem Seven are played by actresses Okwui Okpokwasili, Chau Naumova, Bethany Curry, Athena Perample, Alicia Vela-Bailey, Britta Grant and Marina Mazepa.

=== Filming ===
While Schaeffer was always set to helm "Seekest Thou the Road" and "Circle Sewn with Fate / Unlock Thy Hidden Gate", the first two episodes of the series, the show was already well into pre-production, when a scheduling issue opened up the director's chair for "Death's Hand in Mine". With a script that held deep personal significance for her, Schaeffer—initially intending to focus solely on the show's proper table-setting—ultimately chose to take on the directorial role. Schaeffer, who called "Death's Hand in Mine" a "nearly impossible episode to put together," later noted that associate producer Ishi Metkar served as her "second brain" on set. Metkar was responsible for documenting where all the transitions would occur and became instrumental in filming the flashback scenes used in the episode.

LuPone asked for a script in correct order so she could understand what she was doing while shooting her non-linear scenes in linear order. Filming Lilia's bops, where the character delivers fragments of a sentence to be connected later, required Schaeffer to step in to direct just the bop moment she needed for "Death's Hand in Mine" during the shooting of earlier episodes, necessitating the crew to pause the setup to place a light behind LuPone and adjust a specific lens. Lilia's fall from the tower, depicted in two distinct scenes at the beginning and close to the ending of the episode, were shot back to back and in slow motion, with LuPone hanging on wires. They were one of the rare blue screen shots that the crew used in the show. The swords that hang from the ceiling during the tarot trial were real, but they were also suspended by wires. Schaeffer and her team developed a "sword map" and had to decide where every sword would fall down before the actors got into the space for rehearsal.

=== Music ===
In September 2024, Michael Paraskevas was revealed to have composed the series' score with Christophe Beck. It was released digitally by Marvel Music and Hollywood Records in two volumes: music from the first five episodes was released on October 11, 2024, and the music from the last four episodes was released on November 1, 2024. A soundtrack album was released on vinyl featuring all versions of "The Ballad of the Witches' Road", as well as selected tracks from the score, on October 30, 2024. The episode's end credits feature the song "Time in a Bottle" by Jim Croce.

== Reception ==
=== Viewership ===
On October 25, 2024, Disney revealed that "Death's Hand in Mine" drove 4.2 million views globally after just one day of streaming, up 35% from the performance of the miniseries' premiere episode "Seekest Thou the Road." Whip Media, which tracks viewership data for the more than 25 million worldwide users of its TV Time app, reported Agatha All Along as the most-streamed original series in the U.S. for the week of the episode's premiere.

=== Critical response ===
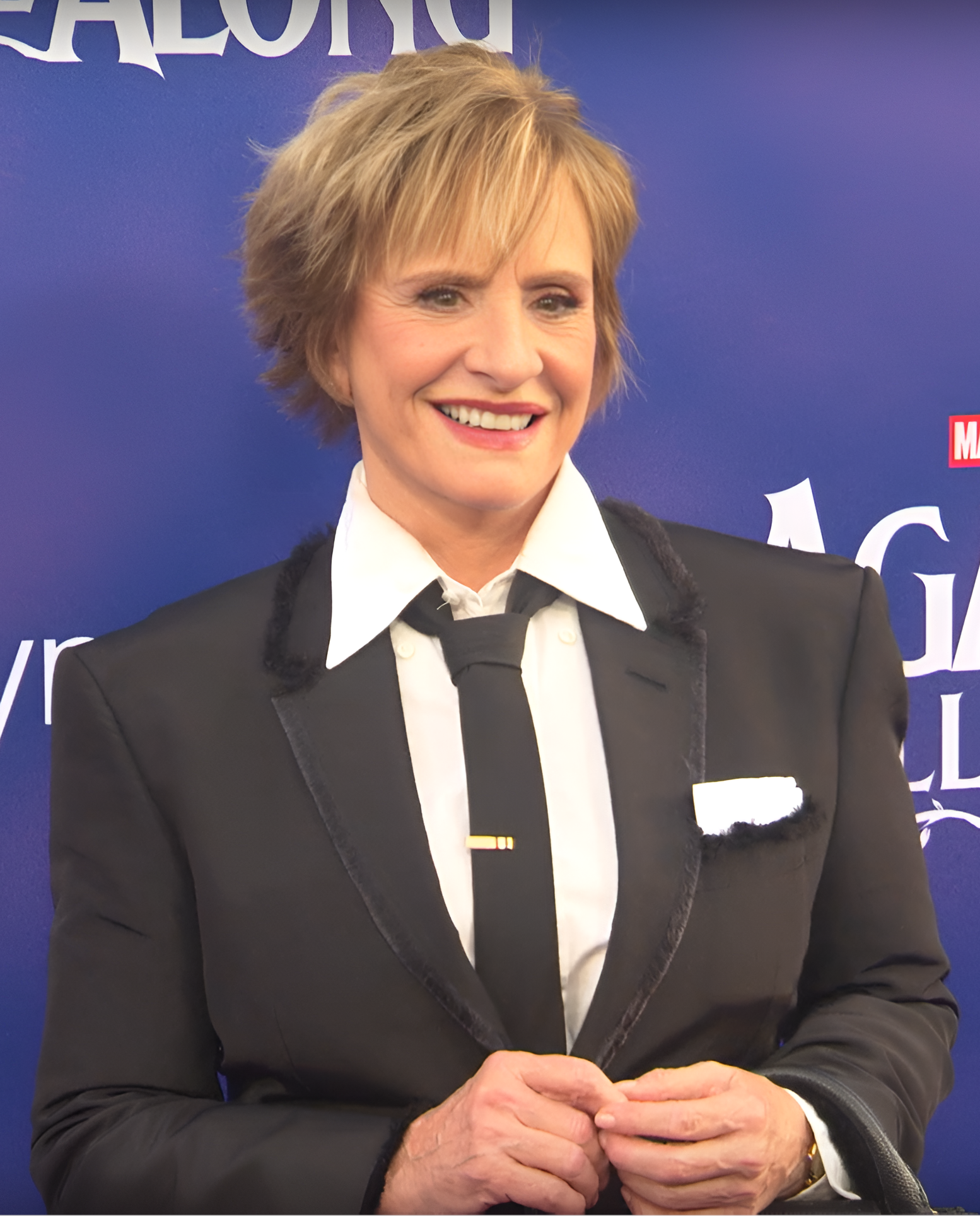
Patti LuPone received critical praise for her performance as Lilia Calderu in "Death's Hand in Mine."

The review aggregator website Rotten Tomatoes reported a 100% approval rating based on eleven reviews. The site's critical consensus reads, "Agatha All Along finds its magical witching hour in a spellbinding episode that casts Patti LuPone as its emotionally striking linchpin."

MSN critic Allyson Johnson called the episode "not just the best episode of the series to date but one of the best episodes of Marvel's television slate, period. Bridging past, present, and future together to reckon with the inevitability of time, "Death's Hand In Mine" is lucky enough to grant Patti LuPone the stage." While Johnson was critical with "some design and prop elements" used in the episode, she noted that "there's an abundance of confidence in the writing and the flow of time that makes for a startlingly emotional episode. We care about Lilia and her love for being a witch. We care about the idea of her being alone for so long. Even as we merely piece together the remnants of her stories, they form a complete and complicated picture." Writing for Forbes, Erik Kain remarked that Agatha All Along "just went from good to great in episode seven," calling it "best episode of the bunch." He felt that "Jac Schaeffer, who also directed this episode, has done something really remarkable, tying up a lot of loose ends and weird moments from earlier in the series in a tremendously satisfying way as we enter the final act" of the series.

IGN's Eric Goldman rated the episode 8 out of 10 and called it a "fitting send off for Lilia, who got a great spotlight here that allowed Patti LuPone to shine." He felt that "Death's Hand in Mine" did a "much better job than the fourth [episode "If I Can't Reach You / Let My Song Teach You"] did with Alice, during her trial, of investing us in Lilia on a deeper level. It managed to deftly feel both like a standalone anthology-type episode all about her, while also giving us a major reveal on another character." Jen Lennon, writing for The A.V. Club, found that Agatha All Along was "finally striking the right balance" with "Death's Hand in Mine." She remarked that "the nonlinear structure cleverly jumps back and forth between the present and the past—sometimes centuries ago, sometimes just a few moments ago—to give Lilia the best sendoff we've seen so far on this show." The Daily Beast's Kevin Fallon found that the episode was "superb" and described it as "a tour de force for Patti LuPone," calling her portrayal the "most impressive" and "best performance we'd get in a MCU television series." Alan Sepinwall, writing for Rolling Stone found that "Death's Hand in Mine" was "both a terrific showcase for the great star of stage and screen and an excellent example of using sci-fi/fantasy to tell a nonlinear story."

Vulture's Caroline Framke called the episode an "incredibly ambitious chapter [that] manages to both incorporate that and unravel a completely different but no less personal story spanning centuries of fear and hurt." She further noted: "Getting to finally see both LuPone and Lilia in their elements is a thrill that makes the episode's final twist of the knife even more effective. LuPone grabs the opportunity to highlight Lilia's with both hands here [...] and she never so much as sings a note—an unexpected move from an otherwise very musical show, but one that pays off, because her acting is just as nuanced and bold as her voice." Valerie Anne from Autostraddle remarked that "the way this episode revealed what all of Lilia's outbursts meant, and also the shots of the witches from previous episodes in what would be the positions for their tarot card, and Patti Lupone's performance—perfect storytelling, stunning acting, beautiful visuals." Writing for GamesRadar+, Amy West felt that "Death's Hand in Mine" was not "just stunning from a narrative perspective, but visually too. All the slow-motion, high-contrasted light, and ornate sets adds to all the drama, and ramps up the emotional stakes. Heartbreaking and heartwarming in equal measure, "Death's Hand in Mine" is one of the best episodes of the WandaVision spin-off yet."

=== Accolades ===
LuPone's performance in "Death's Hand in Mine" earned her an honorable mention on TVLine's Performer of the Week for the week ending October 26, 2024. Matt Webb Mitovich described her work as "a tour de force", and praised her character's impactful presence by concluding, "LuPone conjured every emotion." The episode also ranked 7th on Entertainment Weekly's list of 20 Best TV Episodes of 2024.

Accolades received by Agatha All Along
Award	Date of ceremony	Category	Recipient	Result	Ref.
Gold Derby Awards	August 18, 2025	Comedy Episode	Gia King, Cameron Squires, Jac Schaeffer	Won	
Hugo Awards	August 16, 2025	Best Dramatic Presentation, Short Form	Gia King, Cameron Squires, Jac Schaeffer	Nominated	
