= Maiden Mother Crone (Agatha All Along) =

- Agatha All Along episode
- Promotional poster for Agatha All Along, highlighting elements seen in this episode
- Episode no.: Episode 9
- Directed by: Gandja Monteiro
- Written by: Jac Schaeffer; Laura Donney
- Cinematography by: Isiah Donté Lee
- Editing by: Jamie Gross; Dane R. Naimy
- Original release date: October 30, 2024
- Running time: 42 minutes

Cast
- Abel Lysenko as Nicholas Scratch; Kim Bass as young witch

Episode chronology
← Previous "Follow Me My Friend / To Glory at the End"	Next → —

"Maiden Mother Crone" is the ninth and final episode of the American television miniseries Agatha All Along, based on Marvel Comics featuring the character Agatha Harkness. It follows Harkness, who has been stripped of her identity after the events of the miniseries WandaVision (2021), and her coven as they conclude their journey down the Witches' Road. The episode is set in the Marvel Cinematic Universe (MCU), sharing continuity with the films of the franchise. It was written by Jac Schaeffer and Laura Donney, and directed by Gandja Monteiro.

Delving into Harkness' (Kathryn Hahn) past with her son Nicholas Scratch and the origins of "The Ballad of the Witches' Road", the episode redefines Agatha's relationship with Billy Maximoff (Joe Locke) and brings their Witches' Road quest to an end. Apart from Hahn and Locke, Sasheer Zamata, Ali Ahn, Debra Jo Rupp, Patti LuPone and Aubrey Plaza also star in the episode. Filming took place in the Atlanta metropolitan area and in Los Angeles.

"Maiden Mother Crone" was released together with "Follow Me My Friend / To Glory at the End" on October 30, 2024 on Disney+. It received favorable reviews, with critics praising Hahn's performance, the twist tied to "The Ballad of the Witches' Road", and the episode's bold departure from standard MCU finale formulas, though some found Harkness' past to be insufficiently explored. Disney reported that the episode drove 3.9 million views globally after a day of availability.

== Plot ==
In 1750, Agatha Harkness goes into labor in the wilderness when Death appears before her to claim the child. On Harkness' pleas, Death relents, but cautions that she will eventually return for him. Six years later, Harkness has her son, Nicholas Scratch, aid her in ensnaring gullible witches to feed on their magic. As they journey through the country, they come up with the first iteration of "The Ballad of the Witches' Road" which soon gains popularity as a folk song. Harkness and Scratch employ the song in her murderous schemes, which Scratch grows to oppose. One night, Scratch is awakened by Death, and, kissing the sleeping Harkness goodbye, departs to the afterlife.

The next morning, Harkness is devastated to find Scratch's dead body. After the burial, she is approached by a curious witch who requests guidance to the Witches' Road. Harkness then uses the Road to con more witches over the next few centuries, steadily increasing the potency of her own magic. She most recently attempts the ruse on Jennifer Kale, Alice Wu-Gulliver, Lilia Calderu and Sharon Davis, but is blindsided when the Road unexpectedly appears. (Note: As depicted in "Circle Sewn with Fate / Unlock Thy Hidden Gate".) Harkness deduces Billy Maximoff to be responsible.

In the present day, Billy is confronted by the ghost of Harkness. She explains it was him who subconsciously created the Road with his magic, which gave her a hint that he was the son of Wanda Maximoff. Billy is horrified to realize he was responsible for the deaths of Davis, Wu-Gulliver and Calderu. However, Harkness points out her intention to murder them from the very beginning, and credits him for the survival of Kale, who is seen emerging from underground near Westview and flying away.

Billy returns to Westview and searches Harkness' basement for his spell book. He begins to cast a spell to banish Harkness to the afterlife, but she stops him, admitting she is not ready to face her son. Initially unable to interact with the physical world, Harkness eventually manages to pick up her locket. Billy seals off the entrance to the Witches' Road with an epitaph tribute to their fallen coven members. The two then set out to find Billy's brother, Tommy Maximoff.

== Production ==
=== Development ===
In May 2021, Jac Schaeffer, the head writer of WandaVision, signed a three-year overall television deal with Marvel Studios and 20th Television to create new projects for their Disney+ lineup. In pitches for several different projects focused on various characters, Schaeffer consistently suggested including WandaVision character Agatha Harkness, a powerful witch from Marvel Comics, as part of those series. This led to her and Marvel Studios president Kevin Feige pursuing a series centered on that character instead. By October 2021, a "dark comedy" spin-off from WandaVision centered on Kathryn Hahn as Agatha was in early development for Disney+ from Marvel Studios, with Schaeffer returning as head writer and executive producer.

During a Disney+ Day event in November 2021, the series was officially announced, with Schaeffer revealed to be directing episodes of the series a year later. By October 2023, Marvel Studios was changing its approach to television, hiring more traditional showrunners instead of head writers. Schaeffer was being credited as the series' showrunner by July 2024. Marvel Studios' Feige, Louis D'Esposito, Winderbaum and Mary Livanos served as executive producers. Released under Marvel Studios' Marvel Television label, Agatha All Along was later announced to be second in a trilogy of series that includes WandaVision and VisionQuest (2026).

=== Writing ===
According to Schaeffer, the origin twist of "The Ballad of the Witches' Road" was crafted to reinforce the idea of the show being "a spell on top of a spell", aligning with Agatha Harkness' trickster nature, and designed to mislead and surprise viewers by adding depth to the revelations from "Follow Me My Friend / To Glory at the End". About a month into the writers' room, just like their executive producer Mary Livanos, Schaeffer and the writers came up with the idea of the Witches' Road being inadvertently a creation of Billy Maximoff much like his mother Wanda Maximoff / Scarlet Witch created the Hex in WandaVision puppetered by Agatha, which Schaeffer found irresistible due to the different motivations each Maximoff had despite her initial reservations. They had considered that Agatha had previously with her son Nicholas, with him perhaps buried there, but writer Giovanna Sarquis proposed Agatha singing "The Ballad of the Witches' Road" with Nicholas and that's when the writers came up with the idea that Agatha walked a road with her son, who came up with the song and Agatha turned it into a scam, as if Agatha were Keyser Söze from The Usual Suspects (1995), with Billy having "the Kobayashi" moment when he pieces everything together", hence why they included foreshadowing in past episodes to build up to the reveal. However, in order to focus on Nicholas, Schaeffer opted to not dive into the backstory of Agatha and Death nor how they specifically met aside from a few hints, with Schaeffer coming up with the line that implies Agatha made Nicholas herself, getting praise from co-writer Laura Donney in the process. Schaeffer liked the idea of Harkness having a son who didn't have powers like her and died, thus giving her a tragedy and explaining her way of being. Unlike previous Marvel Cinematic Universe (MCU) projects, Schaeffer strayed from an action-heavy series finale, which she admitted was not "her strong suit", in favor of telling "Agatha's truth" in a character-driven episode. The idea of Agatha evolving into a ghost mentor by the story's conclusion was planned from the outset of the series as an arc that loosely references her character in the Marvel Comics Universe. As Agatha rarely appears in the comic books and whenever she does she is a ghost, they decided to make her one too in the MCU because they felt it right, finding it a "lovely conclusion" for Agatha to become William's mentor that way in that chapter of her life while taking them in a new direction.

=== Casting ===
The episode stars Kathryn Hahn as Agatha Harkness, Joe Locke as Billy Maximoff, Sasheer Zamata as Jennifer Kale, Ali Ahn as Alice Wu-Gulliver, Patti LuPone as Lilia Calderu, Debra Jo Rupp as Sharon Davis and Aubrey Plaza as Death / Rio Vidal. Abel Lysenko portrays Nicholas Scratch, while Kim Bass appears as the Young Witch asking about the Witches' Road in 1756. When casting Lysenko as Scratch, the team considered a child who had a resemblance to Plaza, as Schaeffer intended Death to be Scratch's father.

=== Filming ===
Similarly to the "Seekest Thou the Road" sequence where Agatha Harkness breaks free from Wanda Maximoff / Scarlet Witch's spell, the outdoor shoot for the montage of Harkness draining witches of their power spanned a single day, with quick outfit changes for Hahn requiring meticulous coordination. Hahn's performance as Harkness' ghost was captured practically as she filmed her scenes on location alongside Locke. The sequence with Nicholas Scratch was originally longer, with scenes that motivated the lyrics of "The Ballad of the Witches' Road, such the extension of a scene but with Agatha giving Nicholas a knife to kill a goat offscreen to kill its roasted meat as they improvise a lyric in a bonding moment, but these moments were cut for being "too much". A moment cut from the episode involved Agatha saying that "The Ballad of the Witches' Road" didn't mean anything but after saying that she cannot face Nicholas, she turns to the camera to imply that it did because the song actually meant her son to her.

=== Music ===
In September 2024, Michael Paraskevas was revealed to have composed the series' score with Christophe Beck. It was released digitally by Marvel Music and Hollywood Records in two volumes: music from the first five episodes was released on October 11, 2024, and the music from the last four episodes was released on November 1, 2024. A soundtrack album was released on vinyl featuring all versions of "The Ballad of the Witches' Road", as well as selected tracks from the score, on October 30, 2024.

The episode features "The Ballad of the Witches' Road (Nicky's Version)" and "The Ballad of the Witches' Road (Agatha Through Time Version)"—the final performances of several versions of the song across the series. Schaeffer envisioned the series with a song by Robert Lopez and Kristen Anderson-Lopez in mind as a successor to the impact of "Agatha All Along". Serving as both a narrative device and a thematic anchor, the "Ballad of the Witches' Road" incorporates lore and hidden clues in its lyrics, a result of close collaboration between the Lopezes and the writing team.

== Reception ==
=== Viewership ===
On November 1, 2024, Disney revealed that "Maiden Mother Crone" drove 3.9 million views globally after just one day of streaming, up 26% from the performance of the miniseries' premiere episode "Seekest Thou the Road." Nielsen Media Research, which records streaming viewership on U.S. television screens, reported that Agatha All Along accumulated 744 million minutes of viewing time across its nine episodes during the week of its two-part finale, reflecting a 75% increase from its premiere week. Disney+, which calculates its "Top 10" list by considering daily views for episodes and movies alongside the growing popularity of newly released titles, announced that Agatha All Along was the second most popular title in the U.S. on October 30 following the release of "Follow Me My Friend / To Glory at the End" and "Maiden, Mother, Crone". JustWatch a guide to streaming content with access to data from more than 40 million users around the world, revealed that the series was the second most-streamed original series in the U.S. for the week of the episode's release.

=== Critical response ===
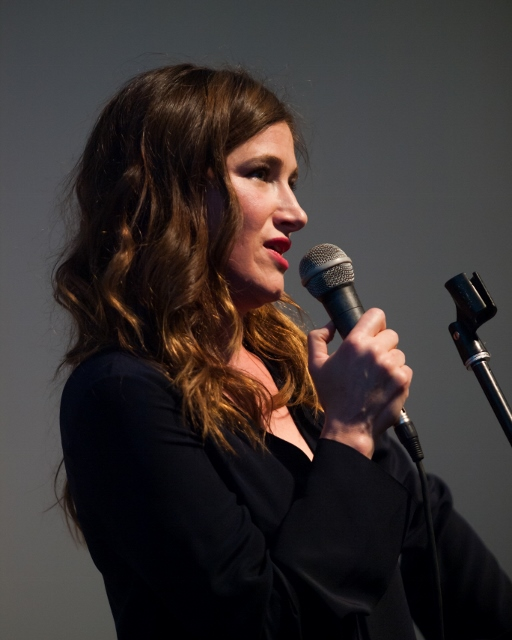
Kathryn Hahn received critical praise for her performance as Agatha Harkness in "Maiden Mother Crone."

The review aggregator website Rotten Tomatoes reported a 92% approval rating based on twelve reviews. The site's critical consensus reads, "Full of derring do, this finale dares and delivers a walloping second twist ending that upends expectations and promises more tricks to come."

In a 5/5 review, Caroline Framke of Vulture celebrated the series' depiction of Agatha Harkness and how the finale effectively tied up her story, writing, "[Agatha] was not a good person, but she is a great character, and it's been a real treat to watch her story from middle, to end, to beginning, and back again." CBR's Joshua M. Patton awarded the episode a score of 9/10, praising it as a "near-perfect finale" that turned Agatha All Along into "the best MCU series to date." Patton felt the episode was "the most complex that Agatha's characterization has been in all her MCU tenure, and it was a great emotional payoff for her solo series". Drawing thematic parallels between "Maiden Mother Crone" and WandaVision's focus on parenthood, Patton remarked: "As another reflection on motherhood, Agatha All Along serves as a nice if darker foil to WandaVision." He concluded that avoiding a redemption arc for Agatha allowed her to become "more human and sympathetic" without compromising her villainy, which he described as "the best choice for a villain-focused series like this." Misael Duran of Tell-Tale TV graded the episode 4.5/5, praising Hahn's performance in the flashback scenes, particularly in the aftermath of Nicholas' demise. Duran wrote: "One of Hahn's most heartbreaking performances is when Agatha discovers her son's body. It's genuinely devastating to see Agatha reacting to a motionless Nicholas." Additionally, Duran singled out the montage of Agatha draining witches of their powers as "another major highlight" and commended the series finale for "ending where it needs to end, with the characters achieving satisfying climaxes."

Alan French of Sunshine State Cineplex labeled the episode's depiction of Agatha's past as "dark, scary, and incredibly full of love" in "another stunning performance by her [Hahn], providing an excellent coda to the virtuosic eight episodes she already delivered". He was more critical of the episode's second half, which he described as "less effective" for being "more focused on setting up a future [...] than actually concluding the end of the story". Writing for IGN, Joshua Yehl graded the two-part finale 8/10 and praised the episode for its "overall handling of death as a concept", but found Agatha's relationship with Rio to be "underbaked". Regarding the series' conclusion, Collider's Taylor Gates wrote: "The thought of her [Hahn's Agatha] being an obnoxious ghost mentor isn't a direction I saw coming, but it is a bold and frankly hilarious one. She and Locke have proven themselves to be an excellent duo, and I'm satisfied by their ending with each other." Gates felt that the glimpse into Agatha's past also "paid off, [...] as seeing her maternal side in Salem gives her beautiful texture". According to Gates, certain plot threads were insufficiently explored as she opined: "I do wish they would have wrapped up a few more — or at least fleshed a couple more relationships and backstories out." Jean Henegan of Pop Culture Maniacs gave the episode a grade of 4/5 and remarked: "Was that a perfect ending to Agatha All Along? No. But did the series come closer to fully sticking the landing than pretty much every single MCU series to date? Absolutely." Henegan praised the episode for recontextualizing the prior eight installments, stating, "Makes me want to re-watch the series with that knowledge and see just how the great Kathryn Hahn laid the groundwork for that reveal throughout. Because you know she did".

In a less positive review, The Ringer's Daniel Chin called "Maiden Mother Crone" "disappointing by comparison" to episode 8, "Follow Me My Friend / To Glory at the End". While Chin found the finale to be a letdown in skipping "some of the more interesting aspects of her [Agatha's] backstory, such as how she became lovers with Death, how she obtained the Darkhold, and even how she became pregnant with Nick in the first place", he praised the episode for showing a "softer side of Agatha" and its plot twist regarding the origins of "The Ballad of the Witches' Road". Jen Lennon from The A.V. Club gave the episode a B grade and wrote: "Agatha doesn't perfectly stick the landing, but it takes some admirable and surprising swings that ultimately make it one of the most refreshing Marvel projects in years".
