= Follow Me My Friend / To Glory at the End =

- Agatha All Along episode
- Promotional poster for Agatha All Along, highlighting elements seen in this episode
- Episode no.: Episode 8
- Directed by: Gandja Monteiro
- Written by: Peter Cameron
- Cinematography by: Isiah Donté Lee
- Editing by: Libby Cuenin
- Original release date: October 30, 2024
- Running time: 49 minutes

Cast
- Maria Dizzia as Rebecca Kaplan; Paul Adelstein as Jeff Kaplan; David A Payton as Herb; David Lengel as Jones; Asif Ali as Norm

Episode chronology
| ← Previous "Death's Hand in Mine" | Next → "Maiden Mother Crone" |

"Follow Me My Friend / To Glory at the End" is the eighth episode of the American television miniseries Agatha All Along, based on Marvel Comics featuring the character Agatha Harkness. It follows Harkness, who has been stripped of her identity after the events of the miniseries WandaVision (2021), and her coven as they continue their journey down the Witches' Road in search of power. The episode is set in the Marvel Cinematic Universe (MCU), sharing continuity with the films of the franchise. It was written by Peter Cameron and directed by Gandja Monteiro.

The episode centers on the final trial of the Witches' Road, in which the remaining members of the coven are tasked with cultivating plants in a basement reminiscent of a morgue. Following the trial, Harkness (Kathryn Hahn) and Billy Maximoff (Joe Locke) confront Rio Vidal (Aubrey Plaza), leading to the revelation of the Witches' Road's true nature. Apart from Hahn, Locke and Plaza, Sasheer Zamata and Ali Ahn also star in the episode. Filming took place in the Atlanta metropolitan area and in Los Angeles.

"Follow Me My Friend / To Glory at the End" was released on the streaming service Disney+ on October 30, 2024, alongside the ninth and final episode, "Maiden Mother Crone". It received positive reviews from critics, with particular praise directed at the performances of Hahn, Locke, and Plaza, as well as its emotional depth and plot twist. Disney reported that the episode drove 4.6 million views globally within the first day of availability. In 2025, the episode was nominated for a Primetime Emmy Award for Outstanding Fantasy/Sci-Fi Costumes.

== Plot ==
Alice Wu-Gulliver awakens as a spirit in the cabin on the Witches' Road where she died. Death, in the form of Rio Vidal, appears to claim her. While distraught, Wu-Gulliver accepts her fate and passes to the afterlife.

On the Road, Agatha Harkness is confronted by Vidal, who has learned of Billy Maximoff's identity and opposes his resurrection. Harkness promises to ensure Billy's surrender in exchange for never seeing Vidal again, even in death. Vidal agrees to the terms and leaves the Road.

Meanwhile, Jennifer Kale and Billy mourn Lilia Calderu's death. They discuss Vidal's identity before rejoining Harkness to finish the Road. The group arrive at the location where they first removed their shoes, and deduce that the Road is a circle. Enraged, Harkness insists they must walk the Road again, but Billy puts his shoes back on in defiance.

The trio are transported to a morgue-like version of Harkness' Westview house basement. To pass the trial, they must cultivate a plant before the overhead grow lights have faded. Kale discovers it was Harkness who bound her magic—unknowingly, casting spells for money. Kale performs an unbinding ritual, restoring her magic. Having achieved her goal, she disappears from the Road. Harkness then helps Billy locate Tommy Maximoff's soul and transfer it to the body of a drowning boy. Billy vanishes as well. Pressed for time, Harkness uses a seed from her locket and her tears to grow a flower within a floor crack, completing the trial and escaping the Road.

She emerges in her backyard in Westview, where Vidal confronts her for failing to deliver Billy and rejecting her affection. Billy comes to Harkness' rescue, letting her siphon some of his magic to restore hers. Harkness clashes with Vidal, but soon admits that it is futile to fight Death. Vidal demands that either Harkness or Billy accompany her. Billy volunteers and Harkness surprises him by agreeing to let him sacrifice himself. Confronting her telepathically, Billy asks if this is how her son, Nicholas Scratch, died. This prompts a change of heart in Harkness, who kisses Vidal and dies, with flowers growing where her dead body fell.

Returning home, Billy is shocked to notice that many objects in his bedroom reflect aspects of the Witches' Road, and realizes that he had unknowingly created it with his magic. He then hears Harkness laughing behind him.

== Production ==
=== Development ===
In May 2021, Jac Schaeffer, the head writer of WandaVision, signed a three-year overall television deal with Marvel Studios and 20th Television to create new projects for their Disney+ lineup. In pitches for several different projects focused on various characters, Schaeffer consistently suggested including WandaVision character Agatha Harkness, a powerful witch from Marvel Comics, as part of those series. This led to her and Marvel Studios president Kevin Feige pursuing a series centered on that character instead. By October 2021, a "dark comedy" spin-off from WandaVision centered on Kathryn Hahn as Agatha was in early development for Disney+ from Marvel Studios, with Schaeffer returning as head writer and executive producer.

During a Disney+ Day event in November 2021, the series was officially announced, with Schaeffer revealed to be directing episodes of the series a year later. By October 2023, Marvel Studios was changing its approach to television, hiring more traditional showrunners instead of head writers. Schaeffer was being credited as the series' showrunner by July 2024. Marvel Studios' Feige, Louis D'Esposito, Winderbaum and Mary Livanos served as executive producers. Released under Marvel Studios' Marvel Television label, Agatha All Along was later announced to be second in a trilogy of series that includes WandaVision and VisionQuest (2026).

=== Writing ===
Schaeffer explained that the series was always envisioned as "a spell", which inspired the concept of Billy Maximoff creating the Witches' Road and tying its attributes to his personal interests and understanding of witches. To balance emotional depth with the level of action expected in an Marvel Cinematic Universe (MCU) project, Schaeffer assigned Peter Cameron to write "Follow Me My Friend / To Glory at the End". The episode was crafted as "a fake finale" to deliver an action-packed climax while setting the stage for the story's ultimate twist and conclusion. Cameron delivered to Schaeffer many versions of the episode's battle scene even though Schaeffer didn't want to enact such scenario due to her dislike for such sequences, with Cameron coming up with really incredible ideas like Sparky, the pet dog of the Maximoff family whom Agatha had killed offscreen in WandaVision, coming back to life as a skeleton from the backyard to fight everybody, which Schaeffer found "really, really great", but felt that Cameron got the kiss between Agatha and Death as well as Agatha's death both right, which she considered "our North Star", eventually finding them their direction. Agatha kissing Death was intended by Schaeffer to be Agatha's way to save Billy in the way she was unable to save her son Nicholas Scratch, but in a way that didn't play out like a redemption arc as the audience would expect, with the telepathy moment between Billy and Agatha not being scripted initially until writer Megan McDonnell had the idea on set, with the "Is this how Nicky died?" line being a late stage idea in post-production with the intention being that Billy was manipulating Agatha after she manipulated him so much, only that he did so in a truthful way to stop her, deviously but not doing so from a dark place within him. Tommy Maximoff's appearance was talked about by the creatives as they planned how to end the show due to discussing what they would do next like what upcoming plans they had for the character or if they already had a casting for him, so they opted to depict him in an obscured way for the show's purposes, with Cameron writing the sequence where Billy and Agatha find Tommy a new body because the writers wanted his new body to be a young one so the loss would be tragic and opted for a drowning cause of death to both have a cinematic and obscure scene.

=== Casting ===
The episode stars Kathryn Hahn as Agatha Harkness, Joe Locke as Billy Maximoff, Sasheer Zamata as Jennifer Kale, Aubrey Plaza as Rio Vidal and Ali Ahn as Alice Wu-Gulliver. Maria Dizzia and Paul Adelstein portray Rebecca and Jeff Kaplan, respectively, while several cast members reprise their roles as Westview residents, including David A Payton as Herb, David Lengel as Jones and Asif Ali as Norm.

=== Filming ===
Director Gandja Monteiro and director of photography Isiah Donté Lee were attached to "Follow Me My Friend / To Glory at the End" due to the dramatic nature of the episode, aiming to imbue it with "beauty and gravitas". The backyard action sequence, filmed over four days, relied heavily on practical effects such as fire, wind, and wire work. Each actor performed their scenes independently of the others due to stunt logistics. Locke and Plaza used megaphones at several points during filming to project their lines to Hahn, who was positioned at a considerable distance.

=== Music ===
In September 2024, Michael Paraskevas was revealed to have composed the series' score with Christophe Beck. It was released digitally by Marvel Music and Hollywood Records in two volumes: music from the first five episodes was released on October 11, 2024, and the music from the last four episodes was released on November 1, 2024. A soundtrack album was released on vinyl featuring all versions of "The Ballad of the Witches' Road", as well as selected tracks from the score, on October 30, 2024.

== Reception ==
=== Viewership ===
On November 1, 2024, Disney revealed that "Follow Me My Friend / To Glory at the End" drove 4.6 million views globally after just one day of streaming, up 48% from the performance of the miniseries' premiere episode "Seekest Thou the Road." Nielsen Media Research, which records streaming viewership on U.S. television screens, reported that Agatha All Along accumulated 744 million minutes of viewing time across its nine episodes during the week of its two-part finale, reflecting a 75% increase from its premiere week. Disney+, which calculates its "Top 10" list by considering daily views for episodes and movies alongside the growing popularity of newly released titles, announced that Agatha All Along was the second most popular title in the U.S. on October 30 following the release of "Follow Me My Friend / To Glory at the End" and "Maiden, Mother, Crone". JustWatch a guide to streaming content with access to data from more than 40 million users around the world, revealed that the series was the second most-streamed original series in the U.S. for the week of the episode's release.

=== Critical response ===
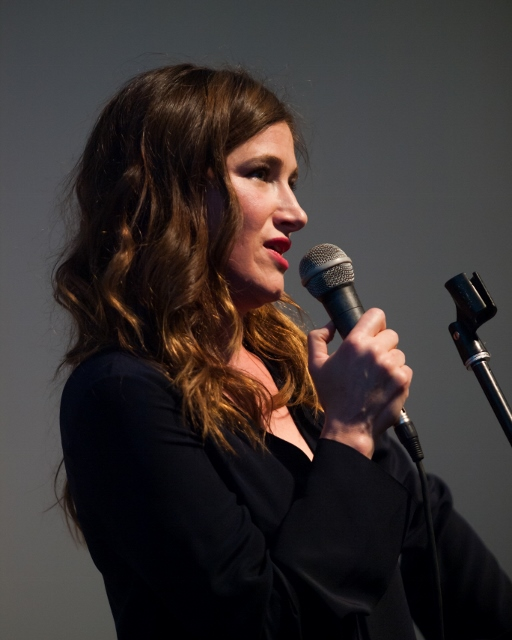
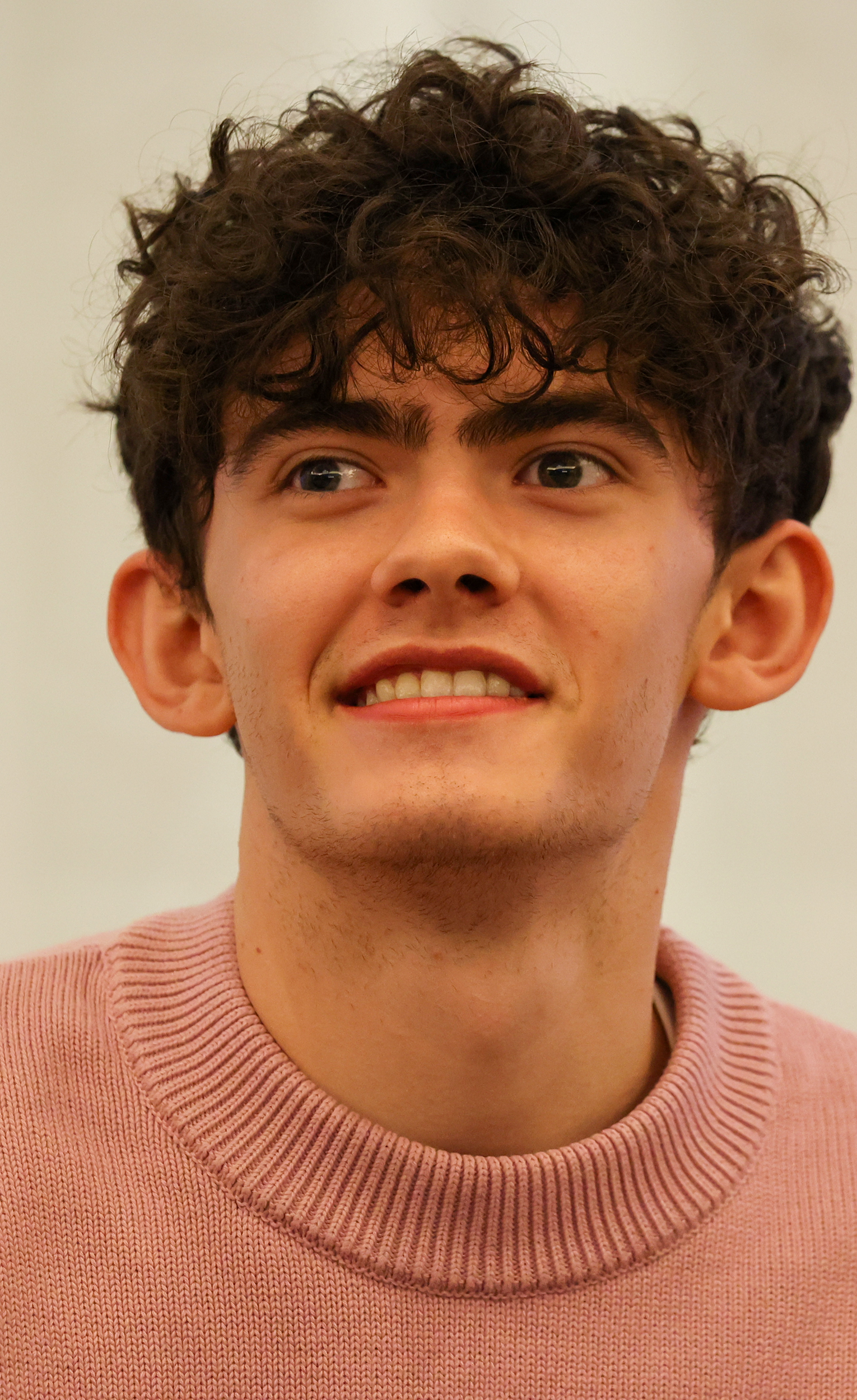
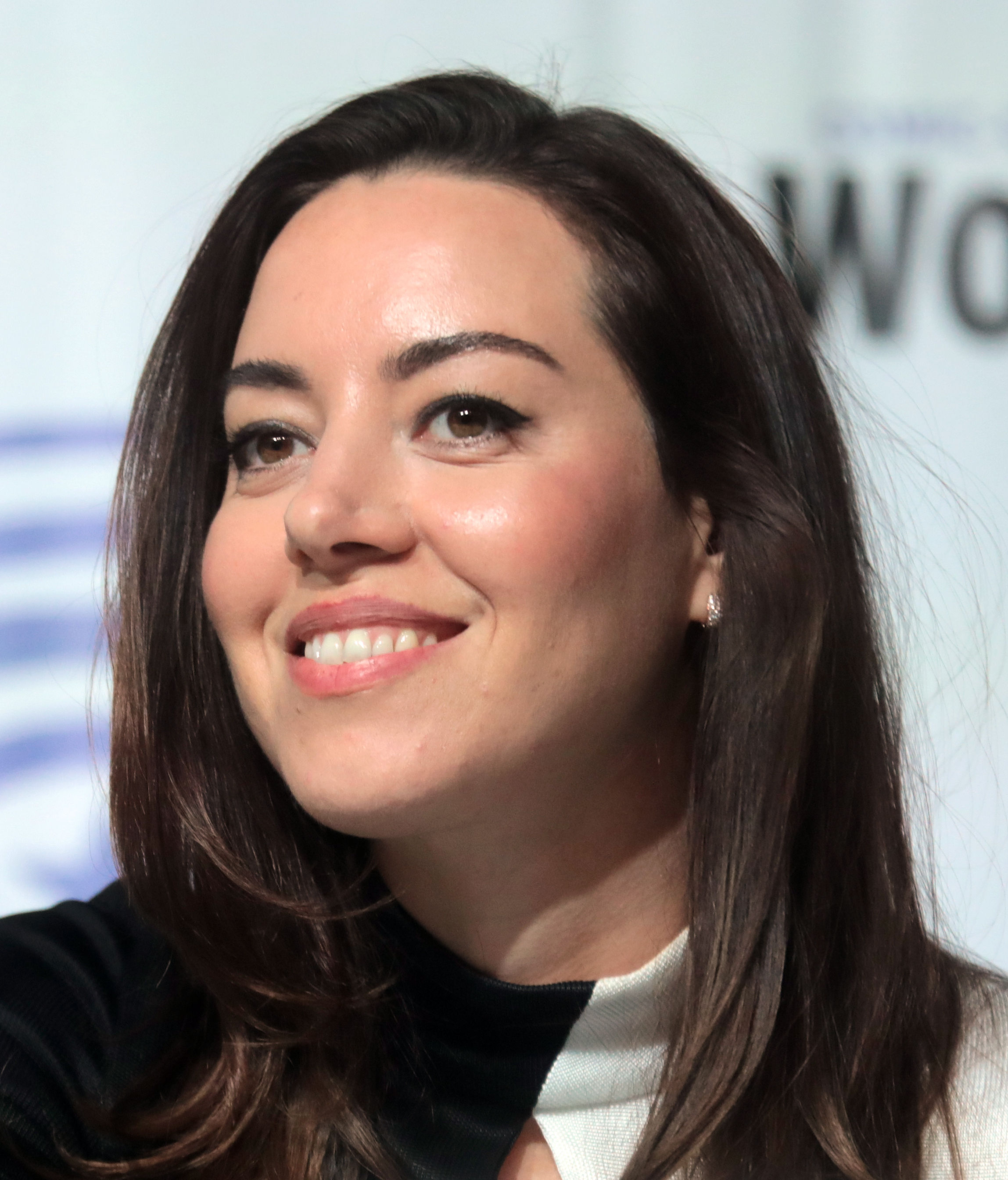
Kathryn Hahn (left), Joe Locke (center), and Aubrey Plaza (right) received critical praise for their performances as Agatha Harkness, Billy Maximoff and Death in "Follow Me My Friend / To Glory at the End."

The review aggregator website Rotten Tomatoes reported a 100% approval rating based on twelve reviews. The site's critical consensus reads, "The penultimate episode of this windy road finds its end in a witches-brewed twist that works -- once again -- because of Kathryn Hahn, Aubrey Plaza and Joe Locke."

Caroline Framke of Vulture lauded the episode for its focus on character revelations over action sequences, writing that "we [...] got a surprisingly bold and astonishingly self-assured piece of TV work that managed to avoid the usual Marvel pitfalls — endless blue-screen sky fights, Ouroboros references to Avengers lore, any single agent of S.H.I.E.L.D., et cetera — to become something all its own". Writing for CBR, Joshua M. Patton gave the episode a 9/10 rating, commending the writing for meticulously setting up the plot twist at the end, stating: "Despite taking a "cards down" approach to storytelling common in other Marvel series, series creator Jac Schaeffer and her writers [...] made sure it was an actually compelling drama and mystery, not an overlong teaser for more MCU projects. Nowhere is this made clearer than the fact that [...] it turns out that the answers have been in front of viewers' eyes this whole time." Joshua Yehl of IGN gave the two-part finale a score of 7/10, commenting positively on Agatha and Billy's dynamic: "The main thread of the show has been about wicked witch Agatha Harkness forming a mother-son/mentor-mentee relationship with fledgling sorcerer Billy Maximoff, and in that regard the final two episodes are a win. It seems Billy's true super power is seeing the best in people – even unrepentant magical mass murderers – and it's a mighty feat for him to break through to Agatha, to the point where she actually acts selflessly for once." Yehl further highlighted Agatha's death scene as "tragically beautiful, right down to the patch of purple flowers her body leaves behind."

The A.V. Club critic Jen Lennon was impressed with the cast's performances, stating that "the core trio of Kathryn Hahn, Aubrey Plaza, and Joe Locke killed it at every turn." Lennon expressed mixed feelings on the episode's conclusion, noting that it "leaves viewers with a messy, difficult ending that reframes the entire series." Taylor Gates of Collider also had words of praise for Hahn's performance, writing: "This entire show has truly been a career-defining performance for Hahn — a declaration that shouldn't be taken lightly considering just how impressive her career has been." Gates also lauded Zamata for her performance in the unbinding scene, but was more critical of her story's abrupt finish, opining that "her getting her power back gave me chills and immediately made me teary-eyed — but her ending felt a bit rushed."

=== Accolades ===
"Follow Me My Friend / To Glory at the End"'s ending twist was named Entertainment Weekly's most shocking TV moment of 2024.

Accolades received by Agatha All Along
| Award | Date of ceremony | Category | Recipient | Result | Ref. |
|---|---|---|---|---|---|
| Primetime Creative Arts Emmy Awards | September 14, 2025 | Outstanding Fantasy/Sci-Fi Costumes | Daniel Selon, Ambre Wrigley, Maddison Carroll, Marilyn Madsen, Greg Hopwood | Pending | |
