= Death (Marvel Cinematic Universe) =

Character in the Marvel Cinematic Universe

- Marvel Cinematic Universe character
- Death as portrayed by Aubrey Plaza in Agatha All Along episode "Death's Hand in Mine" (2024)
- First appearance: "Seekest Thou the Road"; Agatha All Along; (2024)
- Based on: Death by: Mike Friedrich; Jim Starlin
- Adapted by: Jac Schaeffer
- Portrayed by: Aubrey Plaza

In-universe information
- Alias: Rio Vidal
- Significant other: Agatha Harkness (ex-lover)

Death, also known as Rio Vidal, is a fictional character portrayed by Aubrey Plaza in the Marvel Cinematic Universe (MCU) media franchise based on the Marvel Comics character of the same name. As the personification of death, she is immortal. Besides her status as a cosmic entity, the MCU and Marvel Comics characters differ greatly. Likenesses of Death appeared in the MCU films Guardians of the Galaxy and Thor: Love and Thunder, before being portrayed for the first time by Plaza in the Disney+ series Agatha All Along.

Death was one of the entities who created the Infinity Stones. As Rio Vidal, Death is described as the original green witch; she can take a human form and was in a relationship with Agatha Harkness. After Agatha hid from her, Death sought to deliver Agatha's death and played along as part of Agatha's coven during the events of Agatha All Along.

== Fictional character biography ==
=== Cosmic entity ===
Death was brought into existence at the beginning of time. She is one of the four cosmic entities who created the Infinity Stones, thousands of years before the 21st century, along with Eternity, Infinity and Entropy. She is recognized for her cosmic power across the universe, being depicted in effigy form on the vault of a temple protecting an Infinity Stone on the abandoned planet Morag, and as a bronze statue at the Gates of Eternity. Death, in non-human form, appeared to divination witch Lilia Calderu when she was a young woman in the 1500s.

=== Relationship with Agatha Harkness ===
Some time before 1750, Death, as green witch Rio Vidal, entered a relationship with Agatha Harkness, whom she had met while collecting the dead from one of Agatha's killing sprees. The pair lived together. Death, as Rio, can speak Spanish. When Agatha went into labor in 1750 with their son, Nicholas Scratch, Death appeared; Agatha bargained with her over the life of Nicholas, and Death granted them more time. Nicholas was an ill child, and Death took him when he was six years old – though Nicholas was happy to go with her, she made him say goodbye to a sleeping Agatha before taking him. Death may have been Nicholas' other parent; (Note: Suggested in Agatha All Along episode nine "Maiden Mother Crone", showrunner Jac Schaeffer said that the writers "talked at length about it, to the point of, 'Is Rio Nicky's father?'" – and that the team considered a resemblance to Death actress Aubrey Plaza when casting the child to portray Nicholas Scratch – but she ultimately considers his father "irrelevant in this story." Other members of the cast have referred to Death as his parent, using both female and male terms.) she later expressed regret over taking him, saying it is something she did not want, but had, to do. This affected her relationship with Agatha, whom she hurt, with Death later referring to Agatha as "[her] scar".

Agatha then acquired power to be able to hide from Death, using the Darkhold. Death tracked Agatha down to Westview, New Jersey, in 2026, after Wanda Maximoff stripped Agatha of her power and the Darkhold. When Death found her, Agatha was under the effects of a spell cast by Wanda, trapping her mind in an assumed reality. Death was able to infiltrate the spell to appear as FBI agent Rio Vidal and coax Agatha to remember her real identity now that Wanda was "gone". With a powerless Agatha having broken free from the spell, Death tried to fight her, but Agatha implored Death to wait until she regained power to make it a better fight. Death decided to tell the Salem Seven, a rogue witch coven who wanted to kill Agatha, of her location.

=== Time on the Witches' Road ===
After the death of Sharon Davis, Agatha and her coven summoned a green witch to the Witches' Road; Death crawled out of Sharon's grave. Death knew that the Witches' Road was not real, though at first did not know why it had appeared, but commented on its aesthetic and joined the coven as they walked it, introducing herself as green witch Rio Vidal. Her appearance concerned Billy Maximoff, who had been present for her earlier fight with Agatha, but she was welcomed by the rest of the coven: she had initially scared them with her introduction, but they wanted a green witch and were happy to be joined by someone whose presence annoyed Agatha. Still incognito as Rio, Death joined the coven in the second trial, where Agatha tried to get the coven to reject her by tricking her into talking about taking their bodies in a recording booth with the intercom secretly switched on. The conversation, which also revealed Agatha would steal the other witches' power, was quickly forgotten when Billy triggered a curse. In breaking the curse, Billy was injured, and afterwards Agatha told Death to leave him alone; she "mysteriously watche[d] from afar" as the rest of the coven tried to heal him, which Jennifer Kale succeeded in doing. The coven then bonded over discussing scars, with Death describing how she unintentionally hurt Agatha and that this still affected her; the revelation caused Agatha to walk away from the group. Death followed and comforted her, but would not allow Agatha to kiss her, and told Agatha that Billy is not hers.

Death stuck with the coven as they ran from the Salem Seven and entered the third trial. The trial involved a ouija board that initially revealed the presence of Death in the room, causing her to laugh, though this was brushed off as Agatha interfering with it to avoid the trial. In the trial, Agatha was possessed by the ghost of her dead mother, Evanora Harkness, towards whom Death expressed vitriol. Alice Wu-Gulliver intervened to exorcise Evanora from Agatha's body, but in the process, Agatha siphoned Alice's powers, killing her. Death remained in the trial when the coven left, staying to guide Alice to the afterlife.

She did not rejoin the coven, but did appear as Death to reveal herself to Lilia during Lilia's final moments, which also revealed Rio as Death's identity. Lilia, who experienced the end of her life non-linearly, was able to tell the coven this and have Agatha confirm that she already knew. Death realized that Billy was reincarnated into William Kaplan's dead body and responsible for the Witches' Road hex dimension, and approached Agatha alone to confront her about this affront to death; Agatha demanded Death leave her alone, including after her death, in exchange for Agatha delivering Billy to her. Death reluctantly agreed and cut her way out of the Witches' Road.

=== Battle with Agatha Harkness ===
Agatha helped Billy leave the Witches' Road without surrendering to Death; when Agatha then left and returned to her garden in Westview, Death confronted Agatha over this betrayal and Agatha's general rejection of her. Billy granted some of his power to Agatha so she could fight Death, and Death flung Billy away. Agatha soon realized the futility of fighting Death, being pinned back; Death demanded one of their lives and Agatha ultimately chose to sacrifice herself, taking Death by surprise. Agatha embraced and kissed Death, which killed her. Death shed the appearance of Rio to reveal her true form to Billy as she told him to go.

== Adaptation and appearances ==
The Marvel Cinematic Universe (MCU)'s version of Death has been depicted in-universe with artistic representations reflecting her cosmic power at the start of Guardians of the Galaxy (2014), a stylized relief, and the climax of Thor: Love and Thunder (2022). The latter statue is an accurate depiction of Death in cloaked skeletal form.

There is a possible allusion to her, referencing her role in Thanos' story in the comics, in the post-credits scene of The Avengers (2012), when Thanos is told that to take on the Avengers would be to "court death". However, this may be simply referring to the danger of the Avengers, as the MCU's Thanos does not have a connection to Death. Filmmakers the Russo brothers explained in 2018 their reasons for being against Death appearing in Avengers: Infinity War (2018) and Avengers: Endgame (2019), despite comics fans wanting her to, by citing the difficulties in directly adapting the comics version of the story (which they did not) when there are other intersecting plots, and of introducing a new main character in a film with over 20 leads already established in the MCU. After the character had not been introduced come Endgame, Collider suggested in March 2023 that Death would not be used in the MCU, as her main comics story was already "done and over".

However, by this point production had already begun on television series Agatha All Along (2024), including the casting of Aubrey Plaza in an unnamed role that was later revealed as Death. The character identity was never formally announced before the show and, though telegraphed throughout its episodes, was not revealed until episode seven "Death's Hand in Mine". The show's creators decided to introduce Death as their series villain after having discussed what kind of character would be an adversary for powerful witch Agatha Harkness, and settling on the idea that "Death herself ... felt so right". Plaza received guest starring credit as a main character in the show, both a villain and the titular character's romantic counterpart. She predominantly appears in a human form as witch Rio Vidal, but physical effect prosthetics were used to give Plaza a skeletal jaw for some scenes.

It has been rumored, since before Agatha All Along premiered, that Death will appear in future MCU projects.

== Creation and characterization ==
=== Design ===
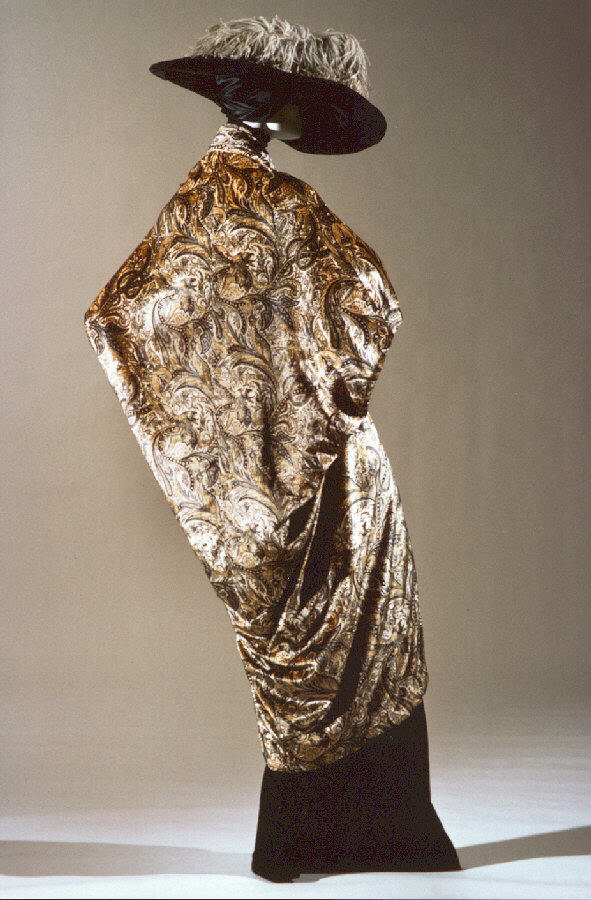
A Paul Poiret "cocoon coat", the style of which was adapted for Death's cloak in Agatha All Along

In designing Death for Agatha All Along, the creative team looked to her physical appearance in the comics, and were inspired by imagery showing a silhouette of her ribs; the character's outfits in the show all expose or draw attention to the ribs. Concept art for Death by Keith Christensen had an "almost religious quality", with design images reflecting Mary and Our Lady of Guadalupe, which costume designer Daniel Selon said became another main inspiration of the character design. Death's crown, sculpted by Xander Smith, is also evocative of a crown of thorns.

Some costume designs in the show sought to reflect her multiple identities, as well as using color to "give little hints": her costume in the 1970s recording studio was a Cher-inspired "wonderful blend of Lady Death and the Green Witch" featuring black flowers; her bodice pieces as the Green Witch and Death are growth-versus-death parallels of each other; and the cloak for Death's skeletal form evokes the hollow of a tree, connecting the character back to a natural space. This cloak was inspired by a piece of concept art for the show depicting "a dark character nestled inside the hollow of a tree", which the design team remembered and associated with the character; worried that trying to replicate the image completely would hide Plaza in too much fabric, the costume designers worked with the principle of a tree hollow. Using this base, they adapted an original 1920s Paul Poiret "cocoon coat" pattern into a cloak with an asymmetrical closure, and material textured and patterned like tree bark.

=== Casting and speculation ===
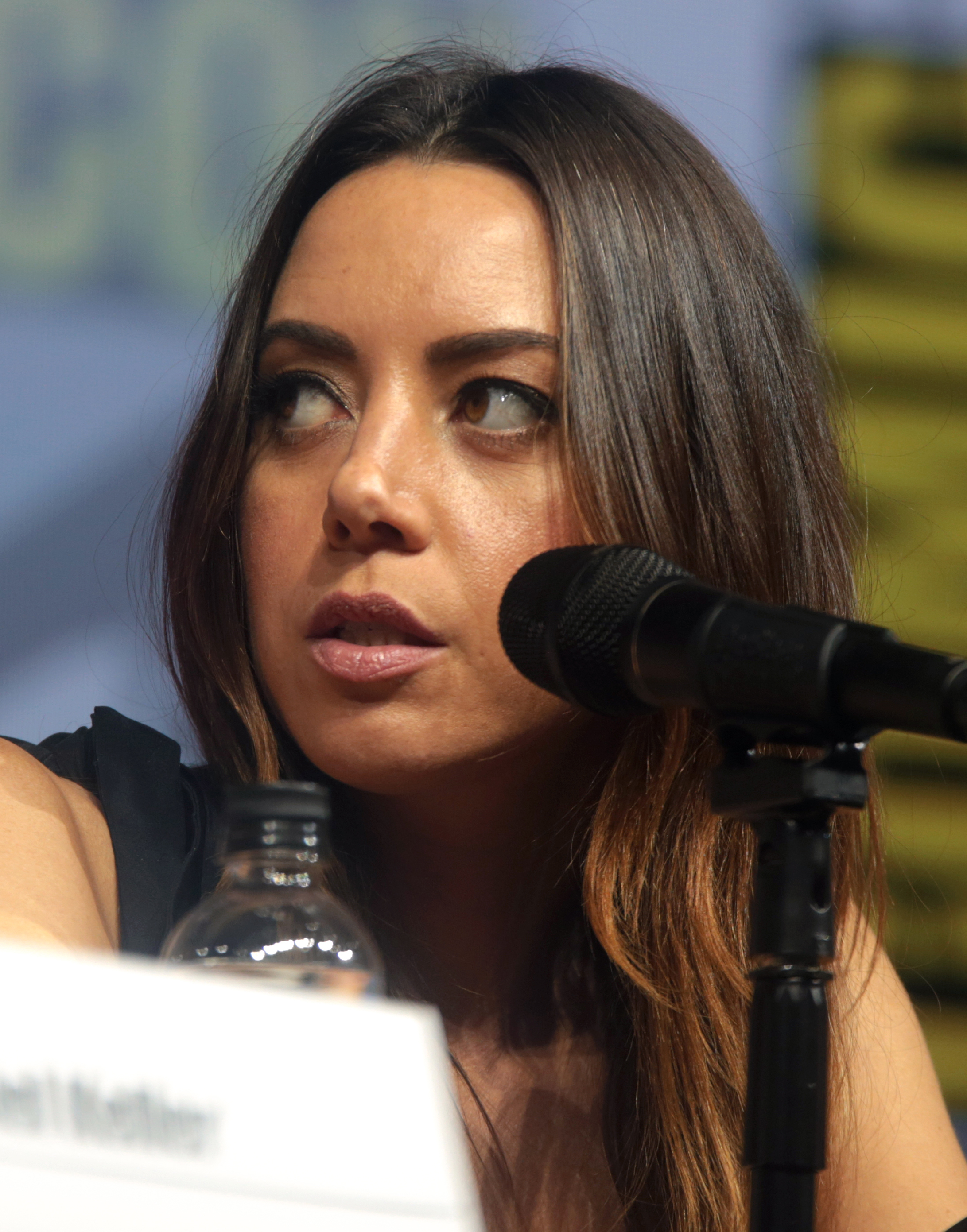
Aubrey Plaza portrays Death in the Marvel Cinematic Universe

Plaza was announced in a role on Agatha All Along in November 2022, the third main cast member attached to the project after Kathryn Hahn and Joe Locke; early speculation focused on the theory Plaza would reprise her role of Lenny Busker/Shadow King from FX's Marvel Television show Legion (2017–2019), which could have paved the way for more X-Men-related properties to enter the MCU. Plaza had also previously been considered for another MCU X-Men role, Domino in Deadpool 2.

She was approached to play Death when Hahn (who plays Agatha Harkness in the MCU and is a friend of Plaza's) called her to tell her about the character; Plaza described Hahn's pitch as sounding fun. She was excited at the opportunity to "play multiple characters in one, which is kind of [her] favorite", and said she joined the project because of Hahn; asked about it being described as Marvel's "gayest show" around the time of its release, Plaza also joked that she joined for the significant queer content. Producer Mary Livanos described the fact that Plaza and Hahn already knew each other well as "serendipitous", saying the production was lucky in being able to use their chemistry. The pair "didn't talk that much" about their chemistry, but prepared for scenes by sending each other music and poems.

In May 2023, before Plaza's character had any official name announcement, it was leaked that she was playing Death; in August 2023, another leak named the character as Rio Vidal and revealed she was Agatha Harkness' ex. Marvel Studios had not confirmed any information by October 2023, at which point they filed a copyright listing for the series which stated Plaza would play Rio Vidal. The character was then suggested to be an original character for the show, though speculation abounded that the name could be an alias. Among the theories were that the character could be an adaptation of Marvel Comics characters including Morgan le Fay, a witch associated with the Darkhold (although previously played by Elizabeth Hurley in Hulu's MCU series Runaways); a variant of Declan "Dian" Dane/Emerald Warlock, a green-themed magical being and adversary of Wanda Maximoff; or, still, the fan-favorite Lenny Busker/Shadow King.

Death plays the drums in a performance of "The Ballad of the Witches' Road" in Agatha All Along episode four "If I Can't Reach You / Let My Song Teach You", for which Plaza had a drum teacher for several weeks and practiced for months before shooting.

=== Characterization ===
Plaza approached the character's various guises – as an FBI agent, the Green Witch, and Lady Death – like different characters. In all her forms, she is characterized by a push-and-pull dynamic with Agatha Harkness, as enemies with strong romantic chemistry. According to CBR, Death "incites confusing feelings of terror and temptation." Plaza noted that Death was entertained "just [watching] the show" of the other characters fighting challenges, and had fun with strange overly casual behavior in the background, due to the peril having no stakes for her. Selon described the character as a source of conflict for the others due to this, that "It really puts a wrench into the gears for the witches and what they think is happening, [because Rio Vidal] seems to be this creepy spectator who is having a joyful time when all of them are really experiencing a lot of fear and anxiety."

Remezcla described the form of Rio Vidal as "wholly original" and so able to be brought to life by Plaza. The green witch Rio Vidal form of the character is centered on a natural and organic identity, and focuses on her nature-based powers more. Plaza described the Green Witch form as mysterious like "some kind of badass ... that just rolled up on a motorcycle" as well as "kind of freaky and kind of weird". Knowing that they would be introducing Death "in this pool of witches", showrunner Jac Schaeffer said the creative team decided to use ideas associated with witchcraft to build out the Green Witch's character beyond death and destruction, saying that she is "about the Twin Flames of birth and death. That it's really sort of the natural cycle of growth and decay."

== Powers and abilities ==
As a cosmic being, Death wields power greater than that of most MCU characters. At the time of her appearance in Agatha All Along, she was the third such being to be physically present in the MCU, following The Watcher and Eternity. These beings, behind the Living Tribunal, also have among the highest authority in the multiverse. As the "original green witch", Death has control over the cycle of life and decay as well as death. Primarily, she is the oversight of death. Dialog in Agatha All Along suggests there are rules about death which Death cannot or will not freely change or break: Agatha Harkness said that for Death to directly kill her is "not allowed"; Death later told Agatha Harkness that she had received "special treatment"; and Death referred to taking souls as her job, of which there are parts she does not want to do.

Death is liminal to reality, meaning she is able to transcend it, and can manifest anything at will. She is able to enter and exit alternate realities (including hexes), shown by her infiltrating Wanda Maximoff's mind spell trapping Agatha Harkness and by her physically cutting her way out of Billy Maximoff's pocket dimension creation of the Witches' Road. This points to a supreme control of space, time, and reality. She can change her appearance, and is shown to be able to bloom flowers. She further exhibited elemental powers during her battle with Agatha Harkness, attributable to her status as a green witch as well as her control of matter, and has the ability to heal others, as she did for Agatha Harkness after stabbing her. She is shown to use telekinesis, and have acrobatic sparring skills.

== Differences from the comics ==
Appearances of Death in Marvel Comics usually involve her in cosmic storylines of space and the multiverse, while her most significant appearance in the MCU as of 2024 is connected to the magical characters on Earth.

In the comics, she was particularly known for her relationship with Thanos. She first appeared to him as a fellow Titan and, as he fell in love with her, she "tried to convince [him] killing was in his nature." She entered a relationship with him after he killed his mother and became a serial killer. Among her comic appearances, Death led Thanos into war with the Avengers and rejected him when he lost; to win her back, he sought out the Infinity Stones, before being defeated again. In the MCU, Thanos' motivations do not involve Death – who was not plot-relevant within the Infinity Saga – and Death created the Infinity Stones instead of encouraging Thanos to collect them to woo her. Comics Death is also known for having an on-again off-again relationship with Deadpool, with whom she became acquainted during his frequent near death experiences. This relationship caused Thanos to be jealous such that he cursed Deadpool with immortality, leaving him unable to be with Death outside of short near death experiences. In the MCU, Deadpool and Death never interact and Deadpool is in a monogamous relationship with Vanessa Carlysle.

In other comics appearances, Death encountered a grieving mother and decided to live among humans; Thanos hunted her down and trapped her in a new Infinity Stone, the Death Stone. In the MCU, Death is involved with humans through also being a witch, one of various mystical people, and her relationship with Agatha Harkness.

== Reception ==
The character was revealed to be queer before appearing physically in the MCU, which was received positively both due to the MCU's otherwise general lack of queer representation and optimism based on Plaza's previous successful portrayal of a queer Marvel character in Lenny Busker/Shadow King. (Note: Plaza's portrayal of Lenny Busker/Shadow King has been described as androgynous or gender-fluid, and lesbian.) After the show was broadcast, Salon critic Kelly McClure praised the series for not falling into the pattern of queerbaiting, and highlighted Hahn and Plaza's chemistry.

=== Accolades ===
Agatha Harkness and Rio Vidal's Agatha All Along episode one "Seekest Thou the Road" fight scene was listed as one of "The 20 Sexiest Scenes" of 2024. Plaza has received nominations for her portrayal of Death:

Accolades received by Agatha All Along
Year	Work	Award	Category	Result	Ref.
2025	Agatha All Along	Saturn Awards	Best Guest Star in a Television Series	Nominated	
2025	Agatha All Along	Tell-Tale TV Awards	Favorite Performer in a Limited Series	Runner-up	
2025	Agatha All Along	Queerties	TV Performance	Won	
2025	Agatha All Along	Gold Derby TV Awards	Comedy Supporting Actress	Won	
2025	Agatha All Along	Autostraddle TV Awards	Outstanding Supporting or Guest Actor Playing an LGBTQ+ Character in a Sci-Fi/Fantasy Series	Nominated	
2025	Agatha All Along	Autostraddle TV Awards	Outstanding LGBTQ+ Actor in a Sci-Fi/Fantasy Show	Won	
