= Agatha Harkness (Marvel Cinematic Universe) =

Character in the Marvel Cinematic Universe

- Marvel Cinematic Universe character
- Agatha Harkness as portrayed by Kathryn Hahn in Agatha All Along episode "Circle Sewn with Fate / Unlock Thy Hidden Gate" (2024).
- First appearance: "Filmed Before a Live Studio Audience"; WandaVision; January 15, 2021
- Last appearance: "Maiden Mother Crone"; Agatha All Along; October 30, 2024
- Based on: Agatha Harkness by: Stan Lee; Jack Kirby
- Adapted by: Jac Schaeffer
- Portrayed by: Kathryn Hahn

In-universe information
- Aliases: Jolene; Agnes O'Connor
- Occupation: Witch
- Weapon: Dark magic
- Family: Evanora Harkness (mother)
- Significant other: Death (wife [complicated])
- Children: Nicholas Scratch (son)
- Origin: Salem, Massachusetts
- Nationality: American

Agatha Harkness is a character portrayed by Kathryn Hahn in the Marvel Cinematic Universe (MCU) media franchise based on the Marvel Comics character of the same name. Harkness is depicted as a powerful witch who has long dabbled in dark magic. After murdering her original coven and failing to prevent the death of her son Nicholas Scratch, Harkness spends centuries as a conwoman, using "The Ballad of the Witches' Road" to lure in gullible witches and siphon their powers.

Harkness infiltrates the Westview anomaly and inserts herself into Wanda Maximoff's life in hopes of unraveling the mystery of her reality-warping abilities. Once her intentions are uncovered, Harkness battles Maximoff and is trapped in a spell that overrides her identity. She spends three years in Westview playing the part of a harmless, nosy neighbor, until Billy Maximoff breaks her out of the spell. With the Salem Seven and her ex-lover Death chasing after her, Harkness forms a coven of troubled witches and sets out on the Witches' Road in search of power. Having survived the Road's trials, Harkness and Billy Maximoff face Death in battle, with Harkness sacrificing herself to save Maximoff's life. She returns as a ghost to guide Maximoff on his quest to find his twin brother Tommy.

The character made her debut in the 2021 Disney+ miniseries WandaVision, and has since appeared in its spinoff, Agatha All Along (2024). An alternate version of Agatha Harkness appeared in the third season of the animated series What If...? (2024). Hahn's portrayal of the character has received critical praise. She has earned several accolades for her performance, notably being nominated for a Primetime Emmy Award in 2021 and a Golden Globe Award in 2024.

== Fictional character biography ==
=== Youth and motherhood ===
After being sentenced to death by her coven for practicing dark magic, Agatha Harkness murdered her fellow witches—including her mother, Evanora—in 1693. She absorbed their powers but spared their children, who later formed the Salem's Seven, a group that sought revenge against her. In 1750, Harkness had a son, Nicholas Scratch, who was fated to die at birth. Harkness negotiated with her lover Death to extend Scratch's life. Over the next six years, Scratch traveled with his mother and reluctantly assisted her in luring witches to their deaths. Together, they created a song that gained popularity as a folk tune called "The Ballad of the Witches' Road". After Death claimed Scratch in 1756, Harkness maintained a centuries-long practice of deceiving witches with tales of the Witches' Road in order to drain their powers and kill them.

=== Present at disasters ===
Harkness was allegedly present at several major historical events in the 20th century, including the sinking of the Titanic in 1912 and the Hindenburg disaster in 1937. In the 1920s, Harkness lived in Boston where she sold spells for financial gain. By the 1970s, she had relocated to Nashville, where she crossed paths with Dolly Parton. Parton slapped her, an event that was caught on camera and inspired the song "Jolene".

=== Westview Anomaly ===
In late 2023, Harkness is drawn to the anomaly of Westview, New Jersey. Intrigued by Wanda Maximoff's ability to alter reality, she infiltrates the Hex and, unaffected by its properties, adopts the persona of "Agnes," a nosy neighbor. Harkness inserts herself into Maximoff's life to investigate the source of her powers. She assists Maximoff with household tasks, introduces her to the local planning committee, and attends the Westview Talent Show. She influences situations to raise suspicion about newcomer Geraldine (Monica Rambeau) and later controls the mind of local actor Ralph Bohner to impersonate Maximoff's deceased brother, Pietro. Harkness is involved in looking after Maximoff's children, Tommy and Billy, while also manipulating circumstances to make Maximoff and Vision uncertain of their reality.

She eventually reveals her true identity and tricks Maximoff into showing her how she created the Westview anomaly by forcing her to recall the past. Using the Darkhold's power, Harkness demonstrates her own magical abilities and tries to extract the source of Maximoff's power, chaos magic, while holding Maximoff's children captive. In their final confrontation, Maximoff overwhelms Harkness by using runes to limit her magic. Maximoff then traps Harkness in her "Agnes" persona and leaves her in Westview as a powerless, harmless neighbor.

=== Under the Scarlet Witch's spell ===
For three years, Harkness remains in Westview under Maximoff's spell as Agnes O'Connor. After Maximoff's death in 2024, O'Connor takes on a detective persona to investigate a mysterious corpse found in town. She is forced to collaborate with FBI agent Rio Vidal—an old acquaintance. O'Connor apprehends a teenage boy for attempted robbery, but his cryptic answers lead her to question her environment. She later visits the coroner's office and, with Vidal's help, identifies the victim's name to be "W. Maximoff". O'Connor recalls her true identity when she sees her own name on the victim's toe tag next to Maximoff's.

=== Assembling a coven ===
After breaking free from Maximoff's spell, Harkness finds herself without magic. She is confronted by Vidal, who vows to disclose Harkness' location to the Salem Seven. Intrigued by the Teen she apprehended, Harkness agrees to guide him down the Witches' Road—a dangerous path of magical trials that bestows great rewards on those who survive. In order to access the Road, Harkness and Teen set out to gather a coven. Using persuasion, threats and appeals, the two recruit Lilia Calderu, a divination witch, Jennifer Kale, a potions witch whose magic is bound, and Alice Wu-Gulliver, a blood witch. The coven's final member is Sharon Davis, a local gardener with no magical abilities. When the witches fail to access the Road, Harkness attempts to draw them into conflict in order to steal their power. The Road opens unexpectedly with Teen's arrival, and Harkness follows the group through the gate to escape the Salem Seven.

=== On the Witches' Road ===
Harkness and her coven emerge onto the Witches' Road, where they must face trials themed around diverse branches of witchcraft. The coven enters a coastal house, unknowingly drinking from a poisoned bottle of wine. As they brew an antidote, Harkness hallucinates a crib containing the Darkhold. She helps spur Kale into finishing the antidote at the critical moment. Upon returning to the Road, Harkness and the coven discover that Mrs. Davis is dead.

The witches call upon a replacement green witch. To Harkness' dismay, Vidal raises from Mrs. Davis' grave. At a recording studio tied to Lorna Wu—a famous witch musician and Wu-Gulliver's late mother—Vidal approaches Harkness and they flirtatiously discuss betraying the group. The coven is attacked by Wu-Gulliver's generational curse. Harkness deduces that Wu's renowned cover of "The Ballad of the Witches' Road" carries protective magic. To destroy the curse, the witches play Wu's version of the Ballad, with Harkness fronting the group. On the Road, Kale successfully tends to Teen's injuries and Harkness oversees his recovery. The two discuss his sigil, but Harkness refuses to engage in conversation about her son Nicholas Scratch. Vidal approaches Harkness privately, but when Harkness attempts to kiss her, Vidal stops her, cautioning that Teen is not hers.

As the Salem Seven close in, Harkness leads the coven in an attempt to flee on makeshift flying broomsticks. They enter a forest cabin, where Vidal recognizes that the trial is designed for Harkness. The witches use a Ouija board to contact the dead. Harkness is possessed by the spirit of her mother Evanora Harkness, whom she murdered. Wu-Gulliver intervenes, successfully expelling the ghost. Harkness seizes the opportunity to absorb Wu-Gulliver's power, killing her. Following a violent argument with Teen, Harkness deduces that he is Billy Maximoff, Wanda Maximoff's reincarnated son.

Upon entering a castle, Harkness and Maximoff are faced with a tarot reading table for their next trial. As they attempt to read for each other, a sword drops from the ceiling every time they draw the wrong card. Calderu and Kale join them, and, during Calderu's reading for the coven, Harkness' card is revealed to be the Three of Swords—depicting grief, betrayal and heartbreak. Vidal is exposed as the personification of Death and Harkness' ex-lover.

Following the divination trial, Harkness strikes a deal with Death, guaranteeing Billy Maximoff's surrender in return for Death's promise to never seek her out again. As Harkness rejoins Maximoff and Kale, the trio are transported to the final trial, where they must cultivate a plant within a time limit. It is revealed that Harkness was responsible for binding Kale's magic. She aids Maximoff in locating his twin brother's soul and transferring it into the body of a drowning boy. Acknowledging her grief over her son's death, Harkness completes the trial by herself and escapes the Road.

=== Battle with Death ===
Harkness reappears in her backyard in Westview, still without magical powers. Death confronts her for rejecting her affection and failing to deliver Billy Maximoff. Maximoff comes to Harkness' rescue, letting Harkness siphon some of his magic to restore hers. Harkness battles Death but soon accepts the futility of it. Death demands that one of them accompany her, and Maximoff volunteers. Harkness agrees to let him proceed, but Maximoff infiltrates her mind to ask if her son met a similar demise. In a change of heart, Harkness kisses Death and dies, with flowers growing where her body fell.

=== Return as a ghost ===
Following her death, Harkness manifests as a ghost in Maximoff's room, revealing that his magic created the Road—a fact she had always known. Maximoff returns to Westview and attempts to banish Harkness to the afterlife, but changes his mind when she admits she isn't ready to face her son, whom Maximoff reminds her of. Maximoff agrees to work alongside Harkness, sealing the Witches' Road's entrance as they begin their search for his reincarnated brother.

In the final episode of VisionQuest, a sequel series to WandaVision and Agatha All Along and conclusion to the triolgy, Maximoff appears to talk to an "imaginary friend" while communicating with his brother. Although she does not physically appear or speak (apart from an indistinct static sound), it is highly likely this is Harkness' ghost accompanying Maximoff.

== Alternate versions ==
An alternate version of Harkness is depicted in the third season of the animated series What If...? (2024), also voiced by Kathryn Hahn.

=== Hollywood actress ===
In an alternate version of the 1930s, actress Agatha Harkness devises a plan to steal Tiamut's energy. To carry out the required ritual, she stars in Howard Stark's production and eventually persuades co-star Kingo to help prevent the Emergence. Harkness taps into Kingo's energy to siphon Tiamut's power, transforming herself into a godlike being. Arishem arrives to confront her, but Harkness traps him with a rune and absorbs his power. With Arishem gone, Harkness reveals her true plan: to use her newfound Celestial power to dominate the world. Kingo convinces her otherwise, appealing to her love of fame and the transformative power of cinema. At the premiere of their film, Harkness and Kingo discuss their vision to inspire humanity, while Kingo expresses concern that other Celestials may react to the news of Arishem's death.

== Background ==
In the comics, Agatha Harkness first appeared in Fantastic Four #94 (October 1969) as Franklin Richards's governess and an ally to the Fantastic Four. She mentored Scarlet Witch / Wanda Maximoff in the ways of magic, and it was later revealed that she is the mother of warlock Nicholas Scratch and the grandmother of the Salem's Seven. She has also been a member of the Daughters of Liberty. Originally depicted as an elderly woman, Harkness was able to rejuvenate and enhance her power.

=== Adaptation and appearances ===
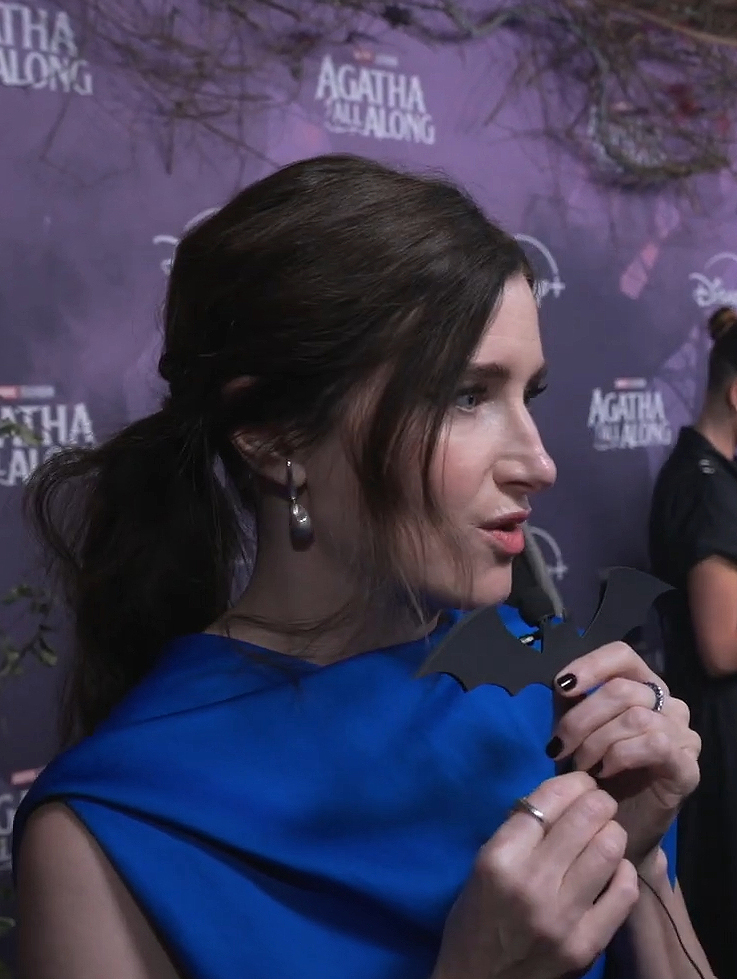
Kathryn Hahn at an Agatha All Along screening event in 2024

The character made her MCU debut in the 2021 Disney+ miniseries WandaVision. Kathryn Hahn's casting in the role of "Agnes", Wanda and Vision's neighbor, was announced at Disney's biennial D23 Expo convention in August 2019. Hahn was informed about her character's true identity from the beginning, a revelation that occurs in episode 7, "Breaking the Fourth Wall". Head writer Jac Schaeffer explained the decision to introduce Agatha Harkness was made due to her Marvel Comics connection to Wanda Maximoff's stories. In the early stages of the show's development, Harkness was envisioned as a mentor to Maximoff, closely mirroring her comics counterpart. However, Schaeffer realized that making her a true antagonist would better fit the structure of the show. The idea of Harkness seeking Maximoff's powers to resurrect her mother was considered, but ultimately not included. When Harkness was still planned to be Maximoff's mentor, she was set to teach Maximoff a binding spell that would be used in the final episode during her farewell to Vision. By the end of WandaVision, Harkness is defeated by Maximoff and trapped in a spell suppressing her identity.

Following the conclusion of her character's story in WandaVision, Hahn signed an overall deal with Marvel Studios to reprise her role in multiple projects. A spinoff of WandaVision focusing on Harkness was announced to be in the works by October 2021, with the project undergoing several title changes as part of a marketing strategy until eventually being revealed as Agatha All Along, based on the WandaVision song of the same name. The miniseries was released on Disney+ from September 18 to October 30 and told the story of Agatha Harkness and Maximoff's reincarnated son Billy as the two assemble a coven to go down the Witches' Road. Having sacrificed herself to save Billy Maximoff, Harkness is transformed into a ghost by the series' conclusion.

== Characterization ==
What I see is someone grieving. She can't get full. She can't fill herself up, and so she's just eating and eating and eating. [...] I was really enchanted with the idea that Agatha's truth, and her true pain, was very human and very pedestrian.

— Agatha All Along showrunner Jac Schaeffer's thoughts on Agatha Harkness' grief and powers.

Preparing for her role in WandaVision, Kathryn Hahn researched her character's comics counterpart. Hahn imagined Harkness "really enjoyed sticking around and being in these sitcoms", and portrayed her relationship with Wanda Maximoff as a witch who has been "flying around for a couple of centuries without a coven" and "would love to have a friend for a second". Hahn called Harkness' real persona "very done-up and very big", and felt her character had a "restless" quality as she studied Maximoff.

When continuing the character's story in Agatha All Along, showrunner Jac Schaeffer and Hahn deemed it important to maintain her "acerbic, sarcastic, self-involved" demeanor while placing her in a position where she begrudgingly needs a community. Schaeffer has described Agatha Harkness as a "frustrated, mean mentor" whose best self emerges when teaching others. Hahn refers to her character as "the ultimate conartist" and "a blooming onion, because there's so many layers that are yet to be peeled". It was decided early into development for Agatha All Along that Harkness would not have a redemption arc. Following the series' conclusion, Schaeffer commented, "I do think we witness change in this woman, but she's not a good guy at the end of the show, and I don't think she ever will be." Schaeffer intended Harkness' past with Nicholas Scratch to serve as an emotional core for the character and be representative of "her truth". Schaeffer maintained that Harkness would "understand the permanence of his [Nicholas'] death" and subvert the villain trope of being motivated by a desire to resurrect a loved one. Harkness' relationship with Death stemmed from a natural discussion about the kind of character Harkness would be drawn to and who would, in turn, be drawn to her. Schaeffer described their dynamic as reflecting Harkness' attraction to power and her desire to be challenged, serving as a metaphor for her complex and enduring relationship with the concept of death. Addressing the character's sexuality, Hahn remarked: "I don't think you can put Agatha in a box".

== Powers and abilities ==
In the MCU, Agatha Harkness possessed a range of magical abilities prior to being trapped under the Scarlet Witch's spell. She wielded dark magic and was able to absorb life force energy and power from others, as seen in the trial flashback in WandaVision and her centuries-long Witches' Road con in Agatha All Along. Most of her magical prowess is displayed during WandaVision episodes "Previously On" and "The Series Finale" when she faces Wanda Maximoff, and in Agatha All Along episode "Follow Me My Friend / To Glory at the End" when she battles Death. Harkness casts binding runes that disable other witches' magic within her controlled space, and creates illusions to deceive others, such as transforming herself into a 1950s, black-and-white look to blend in with Maximoff's Hex upon arriving in Westview. She influences and manipulates memories, emotions, and perceptions, as she does extracting Maximoff's memories. She demonstrates the ability to alter the form of objects, transforming a cicada into a bird in "Previously On", and takes control of Ralph Bohner's mind in "Breaking the Fourth Wall", forcing him to play the part of Pietro Maximoff. In her battles against Maximoff in "The Series Finale" and Death in "Follow Me My Friend / To Glory at the End", Harkness levitates, manipulates objects with her magic, and generates magical energy, often displayed as purple-hued blasts or shields. Having studied the Darkhold, Harkness possesses knowledge of ancient and forbidden magic. In addition to being able to look inside and manipulate other people's minds, Harkness can also guard her own against psionic intrusions from the likes of Wanda and Billy Maximoff. She incapacitated Jennifer Kale's magical abilities in the 1900s through a binding spell. Harkness has a longer lifespan than the average human, with flashbacks of her past set as early as 1693. As a ghost, Harkness is initially incapable of interacting with physical objects, but is able to pick up her brooch within minutes.

== Differences from the comics ==
Agatha Harkness in the MCU has had a distinctly villainous depiction compared to her comic book counterpart, who is an ally to the Fantastic Four and a long-term mentor to Wanda Maximoff. Originally intended to align with her Marvel Comics role as a magical teacher, Jac Schaeffer pivoted the character to a villain to serve as a foil for Maximoff. By the end of Agatha All Along, the character references her comics version more extensively as she transforms into a ghost and guides Maximoff's son, Billy, on his journey.

Portrayed by Kathryn Hahn, Harkness' physical appearance in the MCU is aged-down in comparison to the comics prior to her revival and the restoration of her youthful look. At the end of Agatha All Along, she adopts some of the comic character's significant design traits, such as a translucent look, white hair and a purple gown. While both versions of the character possess extensive magical knowledge, Harkness' power in the MCU revolves around siphoning other witches' energy. She is also a known practitioner of dark magic, and wielded the Darkhold before losing it to Maximoff. Instead of a black cat called Ebony, Harkness' MCU familiar is a bunny named Señor Scratchy. Harkness' son Nicholas Scratch, a villainous character in the comics, has not been introduced as an adult into the MCU, having died as a child. Harkness' connection to the Salem Seven is reimagined, shifting from being their grandmother to having killed their mothers, who were once part of her former coven. Harkness' quest on the Witches' Road draws inspiration from Wanda Maximoff's journey in the comics, where Harkness appears as her guide.

Unlike her comic books counterpart, Harkness in the MCU is often associated with musical numbers, including "Agatha All Along" in WandaVision, multiple performances of "The Ballad of the Witches' Road" in Agatha All Along, and a swing dance number in the third season of What If...?.

== Reception ==
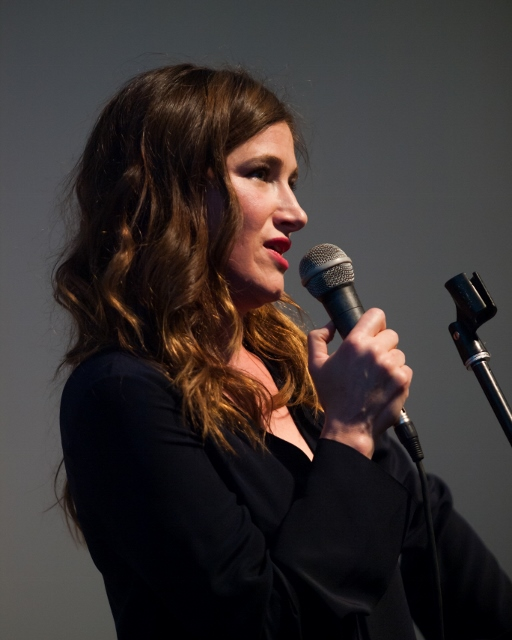
Kathryn Hahn's portrayal of Agatha Harkness has been met with critical praise.

In WandaVision, Agatha Harkness was celebrated for her comedic timing and her subsequent transition into a genuine threat for the character of Wanda Maximoff. Her theme song, "Agatha All Along", went viral after appearing in "Breaking the Fourth Wall", peaking at number one on iTunes' Soundtrack chart, reaching fifth on iTunes' Top 100 singles chart, and debuted on Billboard's Digital Song Sales chart at number 36. It also earned the Primetime Emmy Award for Outstanding Original Music and Lyrics and was nominated for the Grammy Award for Best Song Written for Visual Media.

Following the conclusion of Agatha All Along, critics appreciated the character for presenting a more vulnerable side without overriding her dark nature. Jean Henegan of Pop Culture Maniacs celebrated the Harkness-centric miniseries for "letting her [Harkness] simply be the morally bankrupt character we loved from WandaVision – just with much more personally at stake this time around." Caroline Framke of Vulture praised Harkness' depiction, writing, "[She] was not a good person, but she is a great character." CBR's Joshua M. Patton concluded that avoiding a redemption arc for Harkness allowed her to become "more human and sympathetic" without compromising her villainy, which he described as "the best choice for a villain-focused series like this." The character has garnered praise from queer critics and the LGBTQ+ community following her relationship with Death in Agatha All Along.

Hahn's portrayal of Agatha Harkness has been critically acclaimed. She is one of three actors to receive a Primetime Emmy Award nomination for their work on an MCU project, and one of four actors to receive a Golden Globe Award nomination. In 2021, critics praised her portrayal of Harkness' reveal in WandaVision, concluding, "Hahn looms large and seriously in charge of her craft". Writing for Tell-Tale TV in 2024, Mufsin Mahbub stated that Agatha All Along "does well in showcasing Hahn's ability to play this role and why audiences have been captivated by her mischievous character" as Hahn "continues to own the role [...] with her quippy dialogue and deliciously devilish persona". Taylor Gates of Collider praised Hahn's performance in Agatha All Along, writing: "Hahn continues to one-up herself every week with the range of emotions this part demands her to play — not to mention the speed this show asks her to toggle between them." Reviewing Agatha All Along's conclusion, Alan French of Sunshine State Cineplex summarized Hahn's portrayal of Agatha Harkness as "stunning" and "providing an excellent coda to the virtuosic [...] episodes she already delivered".

=== Accolades ===
For portraying the character in WandaVision episode "The Series Finale", Hahn was named TVLine's Performer of the Week on March 6, 2021. The website's commentary reads, "Agatha's cruel power was made clear through Hahn's acting choices, like the way her eyes lit up just before her old coven turned on Wanda, or the pleasure she took in revealing that the Hex couldn't actually be fixed with a new spell. Plus, that witchy cackle of hers? Top-notch." For her work on Agatha All Along's fifth episode, "Darkest Hour / Wake Thy Power", Hahn was a featured performer once again, this time as an honorable mention for the week ending October 12, 2024. Rebecca Iannucci commented that "Kathryn Hahn has one of the most formidable acting ranges in the business" and commended her for "her comedy chops [...] and her subtle dramatic skill". The publication went on to include Hahn among their 20 finalists for Performer of the Year in December 2024, with R. I. praising her "delicate moments: her hints of genuine longing for Vidal; the glimpses of grief over her son's death; and her surprising — ill-advised, even! — protectiveness over Teen". In 2024, Agatha Harkness and Billy Maximoff were among TVLine's "Top 20 Non-Romantic TV Duos" of 2024. Harkness and Vidal's fight scene in Agatha All Along episode "Seekest Thou the Road" was featured as one of the website's "20 Sexiest Scenes" of the year.

Accolades received by Agatha All Along
Year	Work	Award	Category	Result	Ref.
2021	WandaVision	Dorian Awards	Best Supporting TV Performance	Won	
2021	WandaVision	Dorian Awards	Best TV Musical Performance	Won	
2021	WandaVision	Gold Derby Awards	Movie/Limited Series Supporting Actress	Won	
2021	WandaVision	Hollywood Critics Association TV Awards	Best Supporting Actress in a Limited Series, Anthology Series, or Television Movie	Won	
2021	WandaVision	International Online Cinema Awards	Best Supporting Actress in a Limited Series or TV Movie	Nominated	
2021	WandaVision	MTV Movie & TV Awards	Best Villain	Won	
2021	WandaVision	MTV Movie & TV Awards	Best Fight	Won	
2021	WandaVision	MTV Movie & TV Awards	Best Musical Moment	Nominated	
2021	WandaVision	People's Choice Awards	Female TV Star of 2021	Nominated	
2021	WandaVision	Primetime Creative Arts Emmy Awards	Outstanding Original Music and Lyrics	Won	
2021	WandaVision	Primetime Emmy Awards	Outstanding Supporting Actress in a Limited or Anthology Series or Movie	Nominated	
2022	WandaVision	Critics' Choice Super Awards	Best Villain in a Series	Won	
2022	WandaVision	Critics' Choice Super Awards	Best Actress in a Superhero Series	Nominated	
2022	WandaVision	Critics' Choice Television Awards	Best Supporting Actress in a Limited Series or Movie Made for Television	Nominated	
2022	WandaVision	Grammy Awards	Best Song Written for Visual Media	Nominated	
2022	WandaVision	Saturn Awards	Best Supporting Actress in a Streaming Series	Nominated	
2025	Agatha All Along	Astra TV Awards	Best Actress in a Comedy Series	Nominated	
2025	Agatha All Along	Critics' Choice Super Awards	Best Actress in a Superhero Series, Limited Series or Made-For-TV Movie	Nominated	
2025	Agatha All Along	Critics' Choice Super Awards	Best Actress in a Science Fiction / Fantasy Series, Limited Series or Made-For-TV Movie	Nominated	
2025	Agatha All Along	Dorian TV Awards	Best TV Performance — Comedy	Nominated	
2025	Agatha All Along	Dorian TV Awards	Best TV Musical Performance	Nominated	
2025	Agatha All Along	Gold Derby Awards	Comedy Actress	Won	
2025	Agatha All Along	Gold Derby Awards	Performer of the Year	Won	
2025	Agatha All Along	Golden Globe Awards	Best Performance by a Female Actor in a Television Series – Musical or Comedy	Nominated	
2025	Agatha All Along	Independent Spirit Awards	Best Lead Performance in a New Scripted Series	Nominated	
2025	Agatha All Along	Music Supervisors Guild Awards	Best Song Written and/or Recorded for Television	Won	
2025	Agatha All Along	Saturn Awards	Best Actress in a Television Series	Nominated	
2025	Agatha All Along	Tell-Tale TV Awards	Favorite Performer in a Limited Series	Won	

== See also ==
- Characters of the Marvel Cinematic Universe
