= Wanda Maximoff (Marvel Cinematic Universe) =

Character in the Marvel Cinematic Universe

- Marvel Cinematic Universe character
- Elizabeth Olsen as Wanda Maximoff / Scarlet Witch in the WandaVision episode "The Series Finale" (2021)
- First appearance: Captain America: The Winter Soldier (2014)
- Based on: Scarlet Witch by: Stan Lee; Jack Kirby
- Adapted by: Joss Whedon
- Portrayed by: Elizabeth Olsen; Michaela Russell (young)
- Voiced by: Elizabeth Olsen (What If...? season 2 and Marvel Zombies)

In-universe information
- Species: Human/Witch
- Gender: Female
- Titles: Scarlet Witch; Red Queen (Marvel Zombies); Queen of the Dead (Marvel Zombies)
- Affiliation: Hydra; Ultron; Avengers; Court of King Thor (What If...?)
- Weapon: Chaos magic; Darkhold
- Family: Olek Maximoff (father); Iryna Maximoff (mother); Pietro Maximoff (twin brother); Ultron (father in-law); Jocasta (mother in-law)
- Significant other: Vision (Note: Wanda marries a simulacrum of Vision she magically constructs from her own memories in WandaVision.)
- Children: Billy Maximoff (Note: Billy and Tommy were created by Wanda using chaos magic in WandaVision.); Tommy Maximoff
- Origin: Sokovia
- Nationality: Sokovian

Wanda Maximoff is a character portrayed by Elizabeth Olsen in the Marvel Cinematic Universe (MCU) media franchise. Based on the Marvel Comics character of the same name, she is depicted as a Sokovian orphan who, alongside her twin brother Pietro Maximoff, volunteers to undergo Hydra's experiments with the Mind Stone, which awaken Wanda's latent mythical ability to harness chaos magic and imbue her with psionic and telekinetic powers. Wanda and Pietro join Ultron to seek revenge against Tony Stark for the death of their parents, but defect to the Avengers upon learning of Ultron's plan to cause human extinction, during which Pietro is killed.

Wanda becomes one of the Avengers' most powerful members during Avengers: Age of Ultron and develops a deep romantic relationship with team member Vision until he is killed by Thanos and she falls victim to the Blip. Despite being restored to life five years later, Wanda grows mentally unstable due to Vision's death and, in her grief, uses her abilities to trap the town of Westview, New Jersey, in an idyllic suburban false reality in which she marries Vision, bears twins Billy and Tommy Maximoff, and comes into conflict with S.W.O.R.D. and Agatha Harkness, culminating in the manifestation of her ancient prophesied identity as the Scarlet Witch. After collapsing the "Hex" reality, Wanda is corrupted by the Darkhold and attempts to take teenager America Chavez's multiverse-traveling abilities to reunite with alternate versions of her children. Wanda defeats Stephen Strange and the Earth-838 Illuminati, but becomes overwhelmed with guilt when confronted by that reality's Billy and Tommy, and destroys all copies of the Darkhold across the multiverse. Wanda is later awakened by Victor von Doom beneath the ruins of Mount Wundagore, who erases her memories and recruits her.

Wanda has appeared in six MCU films, beginning with a cameo in the mid-credits scene of Captain America: The Winter Soldier (2014), and starred in the Disney+ television series WandaVision (2021) as well as making a post-credits cameo in VisionQuest (2026). Alternate versions of the character have appeared in the animated series What If...? (2021-2024) and Marvel Zombies (2025), the latter featuring a zombified Wanda known as the Red Queen. She will return in the film Avengers: Doomsday (2026).

Olsen's portrayal of Wanda has received positive reviews, particularly for her performance in WandaVision, which earned her nominations for a Primetime Emmy Award and a Golden Globe Award. She also won the MTV Movie & TV Award for Best Performance in a Show in 2021 and Best Villain for Doctor Strange in the Multiverse of Madness in 2023. The character's development has attracted both praise and criticism, particularly regarding her exploration of grief in WandaVision and her subsequent transformation into an antagonist in Doctor Strange in the Multiverse of Madness, which some critics argued undermined her earlier character development.

== Fictional character biography ==
=== Childhood and origin ===
Wanda Maximoff was born in 1989 in Sokovia, Eastern Europe, unaware that she was born a witch and unknowingly engaging in basic hex magic. While growing up with her twin brother Pietro and her parents Oleg and Iryna in a small apartment during a war, she enjoyed watching American sitcoms, which her father sold DVD box sets of so their family could practice speaking English in the hopes of emigrating to America. However, Oleg and Iryna were killed when a missile struck their apartment while Wanda and Pietro were trapped in the debris for two days. While a second Stark Industries missile flew in, it never went off as Wanda unknowingly cast a probability hex that turned it into a dud, though the twins lived in fear of it going off until they were rescued. The trauma of that experience found a focus in the prominence of the Stark Industries logo printed on the missile. This left the twins with the fervent belief that Stark himself was ultimately responsible for their parents' deaths as it occurred via sales of his company's weapons which he had intentionally profited from.

Years later, as young adults, Wanda and Pietro participated in political protests in their city, before eventually volunteering for Hydra's enhancement program overseen by Baron Wolfgang von Strucker. The organization exposed the twins and numerous other test subjects to the Mind Stone, with Wanda and Pietro being the only survivors and the former gaining psychic abilities while her magic was greatly amplified. During the experiments, Wanda gained a glimpse of herself as the Scarlet Witch.

=== Becoming an Avenger ===
In 2015, Wanda is called by Strucker to assist in fighting Steve Rogers upon his arrival to Strucker's base. She then finds Tony Stark and plants a nightmarish vision in his mind. Shortly after, Ultron secures an alliance with Wanda and Pietro, using their hatred of Tony Stark as leverage. In Johannesburg, Wanda subdues Steve Rogers, Natasha Romanoff, Thor, and Bruce Banner with visions, however, is unable to subdue Clint Barton, as he briefly incapacitates her. Following this, Ultron, Wanda, and Pietro travel to Seoul, where Ultron uses the Mind Stone to enslave Dr. Helen Cho so he can use her synthetic-tissue technology, vibranium, and the Mind Stone to craft a new body. As Ultron uploads himself into it, Wanda reads his mind and discovers his plan to cause human extinction. She and Pietro turn against Ultron and join forces with Steve Rogers to stop him. Upon learning of Tony Stark's plan to give the body life and fearing what he will do with it, Steve Rogers takes Wanda and Pietro to Avengers Tower to stop him. While Steve Rogers and Tony Stark fight, Wanda fights Banner, but Thor suddenly arrives and turns the body into the "Vision". Wanda and Pietro tell them of Ultron's plot and they decide to travel to Sokovia, where Ultron has used his remaining vibranium to build a machine capable of lifting a large section of the capital city Skyward, intending to crash it into the Earth and cause global extinction. Wanda becomes overwhelmed by her role in Ultron's scheme until Clint Barton befriends and encourages her to join them in stopping Ultron. Wanda volunteers to protect the machine's core from Ultron, but abandons her post to destroy Ultron's primary body after sensing Pietro's death, which allows one of his drones to activate the machine. Vision rescues Wanda from the collapsing city. Afterwards, Wanda goes to the Avengers Compound, where she, along with Sam Wilson, James Rhodes, and Vision, join the Avengers.

Sometime later, Wanda is watching sitcoms in her bedroom, when she is visited by Vision, who comforts her over Pietro's death, assuring her that the grief she feels over losing her family meant that she still loved them.

=== Avengers Civil War ===
In 2016, Wanda joins Steve Rogers, Natasha Romanoff, and Sam Wilson in a mission to stop Brock Rumlow from stealing a biological weapon in a lab in Lagos. Rumlow detonates his suicide vest in an attempt to kill Rogers, but Wanda telekinetically contains the explosion and throws it upward, accidentally killing several Wakandan humanitarian workers, to her horror. As a result, United States Secretary of State, Thaddeus Ross, informs the Avengers that the United Nations (UN) is preparing to pass the Sokovia Accords, which will establish a UN panel to oversee and control the team. Stark has Wanda confined to the Compound, where Vision watches over her and they begin to develop romantic feelings for each other. Wanda is picked up by Barton, who was sent by Rogers and Wilson, and they get Scott Lang before regrouping with Rogers, Wilson, and Bucky Barnes at the Leipzig/Halle Airport in Germany. Wanda significantly helps her team through the battle, protecting them from Stark's team. After Rogers and Barnes escape, Wanda, Barton, Wilson, and Lang are captured and detained at the Raft. Eventually, they are rescued when Rogers breaks them out.

=== Infinity War and resurrection ===
In 2018, Wanda and Vision have begun a romantic relationship and gone into hiding in Edinburgh. However, they are ambushed by Proxima Midnight and Corvus Glaive, members of the Children of Thanos sent to retrieve the Mind Stone. Rogers, Wilson, and Romanoff rescue them and take them back to the Compound, where they reunite with Rhodes and Banner. While there, Vision asks Wanda to destroy the Stone, but she refuses as it would kill him. Rogers suggests they travel to Wakanda, which he believes has the resources to remove the Stone without killing Vision. As Shuri works to extract the Mind Stone from Vision, Wanda is tasked with staying behind and watching over the operation until the Stone is removed. Nevertheless, she leaves to aid the Avengers in their fight against the Outriders, killing Midnight in the process. When Thanos arrives to retrieve the Mind Stone himself, Wanda reluctantly kills Vision and destroys the Stone, but Thanos uses the Time Stone to reverse the action and rip the repaired Mind Stone from Vision's forehead, before knocking out a horrified Wanda and activating the completed Infinity Gauntlet. Wanda, along with half of all life in the universe, disintegrates in an event that would later be called the Blip.

Five years later, Wanda is resurrected and joins the Avengers and their allies' to fight an alternate Thanos and his army from a 2014 timeline. In the ensuing climactic battle, Wanda nearly defeats Thanos before she is blown away by his forces, with Stark later sacrificing himself to eliminate Thanos for good. A week later, Wanda attends Stark's funeral, where she reunites with Barton.

=== Life in Westview ===
==== The Hex and the WandaVision program ====
The next day, Wanda goes to S.W.O.R.D.'s headquarters to retrieve Vision's body. However, after meeting with S.W.O.R.D.'s acting director Tyler Hayward, she witnesses Vision being dismantled and realizes she can no longer sense him. She leaves and drives to the suburban town of Westview, New Jersey, to view a vacant lot that Vision had purchased in 2018 for the two "to grow old in". Overcome with grief, Wanda accidentally unleashes waves of chaos magic that transforms Westview into a sitcom-themed false reality and isolates it from the outside world via a hexagonal barrier, later known as the "Hex". She materializes a new version of Vision that lacks any prior memories and starts living with him in the Hex as a newly married couple living their ideal suburban life.

While attempting to befriend her neighbors (painfully forced to role-play as sitcom stereotypes, and kept from their children) and concealing her and Vision's powers, Wanda becomes visibly pregnant. As it progresses at an accelerated rate, she encounters Monica Rambeau, who had been absorbed into the Hex and took on the alias of "Geraldine", and receives her help in giving birth to twin boys Tommy and Billy. However, Rambeau mentions Pietro and his death at Ultron's hands, inciting Wanda to telekinetically cast her out of Westview. When Vision returns moments later, he briefly appears as a corpse before Wanda resets him.

==== Hunted by S.W.O.R.D. ====
As Wanda's children age rapidly, S.W.O.R.D. sends an armed drone into Westview in an attempt to kill Wanda. Enraged, she exits the Hex, warns Hayward to leave her alone, and emphasizes her point by hypnotizing his agents into turning their guns on him. Rambeau, who empathizes with Wanda, tries to offer help, but is rebuffed. Back in Westview, Wanda gets into a heated argument with Vision when he finds out the truth after briefly freeing one of Wanda's victims and reading a S.W.O.R.D. communique at work. The argument is interrupted when a man claiming to be Pietro appears and Wanda briefly accepts him into her life. During the town's Halloween festival, Wanda reveals to "Pietro" that she does not remember what happened to her other than feeling alone and empty, which seemingly made her create the Hex. When Wanda learns that Vision has breached the barrier and is dying, she expands the Hex to save his life, in the process also absorbing the nearby S.W.O.R.D. outpost and Darcy Lewis.

==== Battle of Westview ====
Following her expansion of the Hex, Wanda starts losing control of the altered reality and begins having a mental breakdown. Rambeau returns to Westview to warn Wanda of Hayward's plan to revive and weaponize Vision, but an enraged Wanda refuses to listen and attempts to cast her out once more. When Rambeau resists using her newly acquired powers, Wanda's neighbor "Agnes" interrupts and takes Wanda to her house, where she reveals her true identity as the sorceress Agatha Harkness and forces Wanda to relieve her most traumatic memories to learn how she created the Hex, by threatening Tommy and Billy's lives. Eventually, Harkness releases her, mocking Wanda for not knowing the full extent of her own abilities before revealing Wanda is the legendary "Scarlet Witch", who wields chaos magic and is capable of spontaneously altering reality and weaving together numerous high-level spells that run automatically. As Wanda battles Harkness, the latter absorbs her magic. They are briefly interrupted by Hayward's Vision, but Wanda's version fends him off. Continuing their battle, Harkness reveals further that Wanda is even more powerful than the Sorcerer Supreme and that she is destined to destroy the world as the "Harbinger of Chaos"; Harkness then frees Westview's citizens from Wanda's influence, allowing them to reveal to Wanda that her spell has been causing them to experience her repressed grief and nightmares. Overwhelmed, Wanda accidentally loses control of her powers once more and nearly chokes them all to death. Horrified by what she has done, Wanda brings down the Hex so the citizens can escape, but restores it after her Vision, Billy, and Tommy begin to disappear. As invading S.W.O.R.D. agents attack Westview, Billy and Tommy disarm them while Rambeau and Lewis stop Hayward. Meanwhile, Wanda and Harkness renew their fight; the latter seemingly absorbs all of Wanda's magic, but realizes too late that Wanda had placed protective runes at the Hex's borders to neutralize Harkness's magic. Claiming her new identity as the Scarlet Witch, Wanda traps Harkness in her Agnes identity before permanently bringing down the Hex and sharing a tearful goodbye with her family. Wanda meets with a sympathetic Rambeau to apologize and vow to better understand her powers before fleeing to live remotely in a mountainside cabin, where she studies the Darkhold to learn more about her powers before hearing "her sons" cry out for help.

=== Darkhold and aftermath ===
By late 2024, Wanda had gradually been corrupted by the Darkhold, learning about the multiverse and that alternate "real" versions of her sons exist in other universes. After learning of America Chavez and her ability to freely travel the multiverse, Wanda secretly sends multi-dimensional creatures, including Gargantos, to kill her, planning to take her powers for herself, travel to an alternate reality where her sons are alive and kill and replace her own counterpart. When Stephen Strange seeks Wanda's help in protecting Chavez, she accidentally reveals her knowledge of the girl and that she had been the one hunting her, explaining her plans to him and demanding Strange hand Chavez over. Strange refuses, and Wanda attacks Kamar-Taj, killing the majority of its sorcerers, with the Sorcerer Supreme, Wong, identifying the Scarlet Witch as a being "prophesied to either rule or destroy the multiverse".

During the attack, Chavez accidentally sends herself and Strange to an alternate universe called Earth-838. In pursuit of the pair, Wanda attempts to dream-walk; a spell which involves temporarily possessing alternate versions of oneself into a counterpart's body. When a surviving sorceress, Sara, sacrifices herself to destroy the Darkhold and break the dream-walk, Wanda forces Wong to lead her to a temple dedicated to the Darkhold's author Chthon atop Mount Wundagore, the original source of the Darkhold's spells.

Using the temple's magic, Wanda re-establishes her dream-walk and successfully possesses her Earth-838's counterpart's body. She then breaks into the Illuminati's headquarters and slaughters most of them without hesitation while Strange and Chavez escape with the help of scientist Christine Palmer. The trio enter the Gap Junction, a space between universes, to find the Book of the Vishanti, the antithesis of the Darkhold, but Wanda appears, destroys the book, and takes over Chavez's mind, sending Strange and Palmer to an post-incursion universe, and opening a portal back to Earth-616.

At Mount Wundagore, Wanda begins to absorb Chavez's powers but is confronted by a dreamwalking Strange who encourages Chavez to believe in herself and use her powers to open a portal to Earth-838, through which Tommy and Billy, seeing Wanda choke Chavez, recoil in horror, running from her and crying out for their real mother to protect them from "the witch". As a result, Wanda collapses with grief and, after being assured by her Earth-838 counterpart that "they will be loved," allows Chavez, Wong, and Strange to leave. She then turns the Darkhold's dark magic upon itself, destroying Mount Wundagore along with all copies of the Darkhold across the Multiverse and sacrificing herself in the process. (Note: The book Marvel Studios' The Marvel Cinematic Universe: An Official Timeline states that Wanda dies in Doctor Strange in the Multiverse of Madness when she sacrifices herself to destroy the Darkhold.)

Victor von Doom later recovers Wanda's body from beneath the ruins of Mount Wundagore and resurrects her, seeking to harness her powers.

== Alternate versions ==
Other versions of Wanda are depicted in the alternate realities of the MCU multiverse, appearing in the film Doctor Strange in the Multiverse of Madness (2022) and the animated series What If...? (2021 & 2023), also portrayed by Olsen.

=== Zombie Wanda / Red Queen ===
In an alternate 2018 in the zombie-infested Earth-89521 timeline, Wanda is among the Avengers who became infected by a quantum virus, turning into a zombie. She is then taken by Vision to Camp Lehigh, where he attempts to cure her with the Mind Stone, though she proves immune. Sometime later, a group of survivors come to Vision for his cure, but Wanda breaks free and kills Kurt Goreshter and infects Okoye. She engages the Hulk in a fight after learning about Vision's destruction.

Five years later, Wanda, having regained her sentience and control over her reality warping powers, controls a massive horde of zombies as their leader, referred to as the "Red Queen" or "Queen of the Dead". She seeks to harness the residual cosmic energy released during the Wakanda Event, in which T’Challa destroyed Thanos and the remaining Infinity Stones. Through her controlled zombie "scions"—Okoye and Namor—Wanda also targets a group of surviving heroes, including Kamala Khan, intending to bring Kamala to her side. Using her chaos magic, Maximoff restores a human-like appearance and arrives in New Asgard under the title "Queen of Sokovia". She offers the Asgardians a feast and misleads the survivors about her intentions, claiming she had healed herself and aims to heal the world using the Infinity Stone energy. However, the food served is revealed to be made from zombie remains, which results in the infection of the Asgardians. Thor is later turned as well after a battle with her, as he gave the survivors a chance to escape.

Arriving in apocalyptic remains of Paris, Wanda then launches an assault on Bruce Banner, who has transformed into an entity known as Infinity Hulk, capable of containing the concentrated energy of the destroyed Stones. Her army faces resistance from the surviving heroes, now joined by sorcerers, Spider-Man, and Scott Lang. Wanda targets Kamala Khan for her unique cosmic powers, attempting to manipulate her with promises of restoring the world. In the final battle, Wanda succeeds in absorbing the energy from Infinity Hulk, defeating the defenders in the process. Kamala, convinced by a vision of a restored reality, ultimately takes Wanda’s hand. This act triggers a massive energy burst that creates an illusory world masking the ongoing zombie apocalypse.

==== Other appearances ====
A version of Zombie Wanda, along with a horde of zombies, is also depicted being transported by Doctor Strange Supreme to an uninhabited universe to distract Infinity Ultron, before facing a planetary explosion done by Ultron's Infinity Stone.

Afterwards, she is captured by Strange Supreme and held captive in his Sanctum Infinitum. She is released by Captain Peggy Carter and soon after, mind controls other zombies to attack Carter and Kahhori. During a duel with Kahhori, she gets sent through a portal back to her universe.

=== Wanda-Merlin ===
In an alternate medieval-themed universe, Wanda uses her Chaos Magic to transport Captain Peggy Carter from Peggy's universe to Wanda's own. Wanda and Nick Fury discuss Captain Carter being the one who can save both their queen and their world. Later, during the scuffle between King Thor's guards and Rogers Hood's crew of thieves, Wanda uses her powers to contain the next incursion. She also helps Carter and Rogers's crew obtain the Time Stone from King Thor's Scepter, and place on Tony Stark's machine, which identifies Rogers as the "forerunner" who has been inadvertently been causing the incursions. Wanda is then sent back to her timeline after Carter and Rogers undo the incursion.

=== Earth-838 ===
In an alternate 2021, Wanda lives a peaceful suburban life with her children Tommy and Billy. She is possessed by her counterpart from Earth-616, who is hunting for America Chavez through the multiverse. The possessed Wanda then kills most of the Illuminati in cold blood, but is eventually freed from the spell. When 616-Wanda returns through a multiverse portal, Wanda attempts to protect her frightened children from 616-Wanda, causing the latter to acknowledge the suffering she has caused and end her deadly hunt for Chavez before she kills herself to destroy the Darkhold.

== Background ==
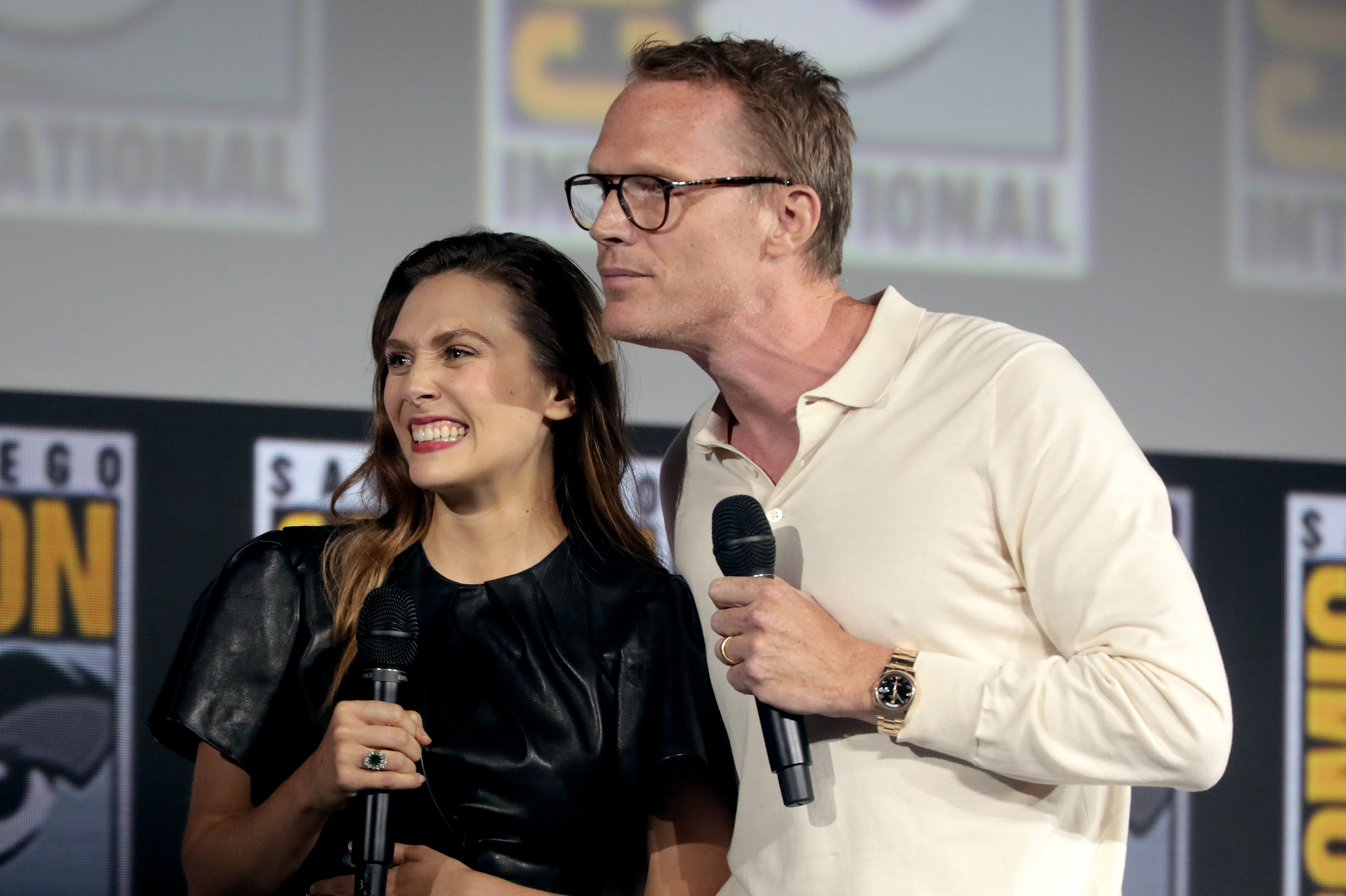
Elizabeth Olsen and Paul Bettany at the 2019 San Diego Comic-Con, for WandaVision

The Scarlet Witch debuted, alongside her twin brother, Quicksilver, as a part of the Brotherhood of Evil Mutants in X-Men #4 (March 1964). They were depicted as reluctant villains, uninterested in Magneto's ideologies. Scarlet Witch was depicted as introverted and disdainful of her teammates.

Stan Lee, author of the Avengers comic book, composed the team of Marvel's most prominent heroes. However, he eventually altered the team roster, removing all but Captain America, and added villains from other comics: the Scarlet Witch and Quicksilver from the X-Men, and Hawkeye from Iron Man's adventures in Tales of Suspense. The team was known as "Cap's Kooky Quartet". Although common in later years, such a change in the roster of a superhero group was completely unprecedented. Scarlet Witch would now become a lasting member of the team.

Some years later, Avengers writer Roy Thomas started a long-running romantic relationship between the Scarlet Witch and the Vision, considering that it would help with the series' character development. He selected those characters because they were only published in the Avengers comic book, so it would not interfere with other publications.

=== Adaptation and appearances ===
In the 1990s, Marvel licensed the filming rights of the X-Men and related concepts, such as mutants, to 20th Century Fox. Fox created a film series based on the franchise. Years later, Marvel started its own film franchise, the Marvel Cinematic Universe, focused on the characters that they had not licensed to other studios, such as the Avengers. The main core of this franchise was the Avengers, both in standalone films and the successful The Avengers film. Quicksilver and Scarlet Witch were disputed by both studios. Fox would claim the rights over them because they were both mutants and children of Magneto, the villain of most of their films, and Marvel would claim those rights because the editorial history of the characters in comic books is more associated with the Avengers rather than the X-Men. The studios made an agreement so that both of them would use the characters. It was made on the condition that the plots do not make reference to the other studio's properties: the Fox films cannot mention them as members of the Avengers, and the Marvel films cannot mention them as mutants or children of Magneto. Despite this deal, films in the Fox X-Men series did not feature Scarlet Witch.

In May 2013, Joss Whedon considered Saoirse Ronan to be his "prototype" actress for the part, but by August of that year, Elizabeth Olsen had been cast for the role. Olsen has since played Wanda Maximoff in the Marvel Cinematic Universe. Olsen noted that when Joss Whedon offered her the role, he said "[wh]en you go home and Google her, just know you will never ever have to wear what she wears in the comics", and, in keeping with this, Wanda's comic book costume was ignored in favor of more casual clothing. She first appeared, as well as Quicksilver, in a mid-credits scene of the 2014 film Captain America: The Winter Soldier as a prisoner of Baron Strucker (Thomas Kretschmann). Scarlet Witch became a supporting character in the 2015 film Avengers: Age of Ultron, where the siblings initially conspire with Ultron (James Spader), a reflection of their initial villainous roles in the comics, but later defect to the Avengers. Quicksilver dies in the ensuing conflict while Wanda goes on to become a member of Captain America's Avengers. She appears in the 2016 film Captain America: Civil War. Both Olsen and Aaron Taylor-Johnson signed multi-picture deals. Olsen reprises the role in the 2018 film Avengers: Infinity War, its 2019 sequel Avengers: Endgame, and the 2022 film Doctor Strange in the Multiverse of Madness. In the films, her powers are telekinetic and telepathic abilities, which she gained by volunteering as a test subject in Hydra experiments to create supersoldiers, by exposing her to the Mind Stone. Therefore, both she and her brother are described in the films as "enhanced humans", as opposed to the naturally occurring mutants they are in the comics.

By September 2018, Marvel Studios began developing several limited series for Disney's streaming service, Disney+, to be centered on "second tier" characters from the Marvel Cinematic Universe films who had not and were unlikely to star in their own films, such as Scarlet Witch, with Elizabeth Olsen expected to reprise her role. The title of this show was later revealed to be WandaVision, co-starring Paul Bettany as the Vision. It premiered in January 2021. As the show is premised on Wanda and Vision appearing in a sitcom (apparently constructed by Wanda to escape her grief over Vision's real-world death), her appearance throughout the series reflects the clothing styles of sitcom characters across different decades of the genre. By the finale, having fully embraced her identity as the Scarlet Witch, Wanda gains a new costume reflecting a modernized version of her comic counterpart. In November 2026, Olsen reprised her role in the post-credits scene of the series finale of VisionQuest, which takes place after Doctor Strange in the Multiverse of Madness and sets up Wanda's future appearance in the film Avengers: Doomsday.

== Characterization ==
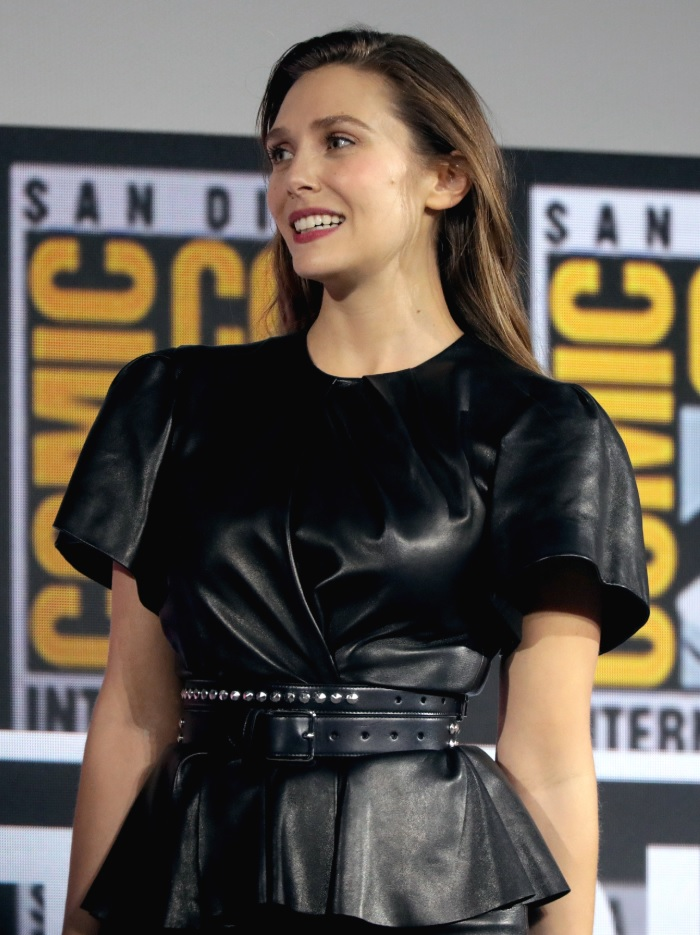
Elizabeth Olsen at Comic-Con 2019, promoting Doctor Strange in the Multiverse of Madness

Wanda is first fully introduced in Avengers: Age of Ultron as the twin sister of Pietro Maximoff who can engage in hypnosis and telekinesis. Olsen felt Wanda was "overly stimulated" rather than "mentally insane" because "she has such a vast amount of knowledge that she's unable to learn how to control it. No one taught her how to control it properly... she can connect to this world and parallel worlds at the same time, and parallel times". Describing her character's mind control powers, Olsen said that the character is able to do more than manipulating someone's mind, with Scarlet Witch able to "feel and see what they feel and see" by projecting visions that they have never seen. Olsen expanded upon this, saying, "What I love about her is that, in so many superhero films, emotions are kind of negated a bit, but for her everything that someone else could feel—like their weakest moments—she physically goes through that same experience with them, which is pretty cool". Olsen drew on her relationship with her older brother and her sisters to prepare for the role, as well as looking to the comics for inspiration. Olsen revealed that Whedon was inspired by dancers as a way to visually represent how the character moves. As such, Olsen mostly trained with dancer Jennifer White in lieu of traditional stunt training.

In Captain America: Civil War, Wanda allies with Steve Rogers against the Sokovia Accords. According to Olsen, the character is "coming into her own and starting to understand and have conflict with how she wants to use her abilities". As such, Wanda's costume was "relatively casual" and "more clothes-based than superhero-based" according to Makovsky, who believed that Wanda was not a full-fledged superhero yet in "the minds of the Russo brothers". When asked about the relationship between her character and the Vision compared to the comics, Olsen said, "You learn a little bit more about what connects [Scarlet and Vision] in this film. And I think there's some really sweet moments between Paul and I, and it's more about how they relate to one another and their similarities just based on their superpowers".

In Avengers: Infinity War, Olsen explains that Wanda and Vision have maintained a romance while Wanda remains in hiding and are "trying to within that time find points of meeting in different places in order to try and forward our relationship". Paul Bettany described it as the most emotional arc for the characters. In early drafts of Infinity War and Endgame, the screenwriters had Wanda survive the snap and participate more substantially in the events of Endgame, while still mourning Vision, but this angle was ultimately dropped because "she'd gotten so much mileage and story in the first movie that she didn't really have anything that equaled that in the second".

In WandaVision, Olsen said the character is brought more in line with the comic book version, including depicting her mental illness, while introducing the "Scarlet Witch" moniker that was not previously used in the Marvel Cinematic Universe (MCU) outside of promotional material. Marvel Studios executive producer Kevin Feige said the series explores the extent and origin of Wanda's powers. Olsen felt her "ownership" of Wanda was strengthened during development of the series, which allowed her to explore new parts of the character's personality such as her humor and sassiness. She was thrilled that WandaVision focuses on Wanda rather than making her a supporting character as in the films, and was sold on joining the series when Feige mentioned the specific Scarlet Witch comic storylines that inspired WandaVision. Olsen was influenced by Mary Tyler Moore, Elizabeth Montgomery, and Lucille Ball for her performance. Michaela Russell portrays a young Wanda.

Doctor Strange in the Multiverse of Madness continues Wanda's "ownership of what makes her unique and the accountability of her life experience" that began in the series WandaVision (2021), with an example of this being a return to an accent that is more true to her Sokovian heritage after some of the previous MCU films had moved to an Americanized version. Olsen was largely unaware of the Multiverse of Madness story while filming WandaVision and tried to ensure Wanda's role in the film honored the events of the series rather than having the series be affected by the film. Olsen also portrays the character's Earth-838 counterpart.

== Powers and abilities ==
Wanda is introduced in Avengers: Age of Ultron as possessing telekinesis and the ability to influence other people's minds, including inducing visions based on their fears. Her powers are represented on screen by red energy emanating from her hands. She subsequently demonstrates the ability to create protective barriers, move large objects and fly. Although her abilities initially appear to result from Hydra's experiments with the Mind Stone, WandaVision establishes that she possessed an aptitude for magic from childhood and that exposure to the Stone amplified her existing abilities.

WandaVision identifies Wanda's abilities as chaos magic, which allows her to reshape physical surroundings and create apparently living beings. Her uncontrolled use of this magic transforms Westview and produces manifestations of Vision and their children. Series creator Jac Schaeffer described chaos magic as a form of creation magic and emphasized the unusual extent of Wanda's power. Wanda also learns to use magical runes, which prevent other witches from casting spells within a defined area.

The Darkhold gives Wanda access to additional dark magic, including dreamwalking, through which she can control the body of a counterpart in another universe. In Doctor Strange in the Multiverse of Madness, the book's influence contributes to her increasingly destructive conduct. Screenwriter Michael Waldron explained that the Darkhold exploits Wanda's unresolved anger and impairs her judgment.

== Differences from the comics ==
The MCU adaptation modifies several aspects of the Scarlet Witch's history in Marvel Comics. Wanda and Pietro first appeared in the comics as members of Magneto's Brotherhood of Mutants, and for decades were portrayed as his mutant children. The comics subsequently revised this origin: a 2014 story established that Magneto was not their father, while a 2015 storyline revealed that the twins were not mutants. Media scholar Monica Roxanne Sandler identified these changes as an example of the relationship between Marvel's film adaptations and its comic-book continuity. In the MCU, the twins are instead introduced as Sokovians whose powers have been affected by Hydra's experiments with the Mind Stone.

The portrayal of Wanda's heritage has also prompted criticism. Although the comic-book character has a history involving a Romani family and was for many years associated with Jewish heritage through Magneto, these elements were not incorporated into her MCU depiction as discussed by The Washington Post in 2022. The newspaper interviewed Romani fans who expressed concern about the omission, while also criticizing stereotypes associated with the character's portrayal in the comics.

The portrayal of Wanda's powers also changes across the adaptation. Her initial MCU appearances emphasize telekinesis and mental manipulation rather than the probability-altering hexes associated with her early comic-book stories. WandaVision later introduces chaos magic, reality alteration and the title "Scarlet Witch" into the on-screen narrative, bringing these aspects of Wanda closer to the comic-book depiction. The series additionally establishes that her magical ability predates Hydra's experiments, whereas the earlier films had associated her powers primarily with the Mind Stone.

== Reception ==
Following the release of Avengers: Endgame, Rachel Leishman of the feminist "geek site" The Mary Sue wrote that Wanda "isn't the most fleshed out of characters because she is often tied down to a male character and very rarely does anything but kill people accidentally," but that Avengers: Infinity War provided "the Wanda who understands her placement among the Avengers and her abilities", and by Avengers: Endgame, Wanda is "taking on her position as one of the new leaders of the Avengers". Jen Chaney of Vulture reviewed WandaVision positively, stating that "Olsen and Bettany's characters were often treated like benchwarmers on an all-star team in the Avengers movies. Here, they really shine". Eric Deggans of NPR state of the character that "a confused and grief-stricken product of experimentation, saddled with powers she doesn't understand and struggles to control, becomes the Scarlet Witch – one of the most powerful figures in the Marvel Cinematic Universe". IndieWire praised Elizabeth Olsen's performance as Wanda, stating, "her work on WandaVision which showcases her tremendous dramatic talent and, even more impressive, introduces her as a true comic delight". The Ringer complimented the evolution of the character through all of her appearances, explaining, "She's gone from a mysterious figure that even Thanos treated as an afterthought to one of the MCU's most compelling characters".

For her performance in Doctor Strange in the Multiverse of Madness, Olsen received critical acclaim, with some film critics stating it could lead the actress to receive her first Academy Award nomination. Davis Caballero of Screen Rant referred to Olsen as the "definitive shining star" of the MCU's Phase Four for her performance across WandaVision and Doctor Strange in the Multiverse of Madness, writing, "No one comes close to what Olsen achieved in WandaVision and Multiverse of Madness; indeed, the actor has set the bar too high". Rachel Leishman of The Mary Sue wrote that Olsen managed to understand and portray the pain felt by her character through the movie, calling her a "powerhouse". Richard Roeper of the Chicago Sun-Times praised the performance of Elizabeth Olsen in Doctor Strange in the Multiverse of Madness, even commenting that he believed the character of Wanda had the most compelling of the film's character arcs. Chris E. Hayner of GameSpot ranked Wanda Maximoff 7th in their "38 Marvel Cinematic Universe Superheroes" list, stating, "Even before WandaVision, Wanda proved time and again how powerful she was and what she was willing to do for those she loved. She may have taken that too far in the latest Doctor Strange movie, but she made the right choice in the end, proving she's ultimately a hero".

=== Accolades ===
Year	Work	Award	Category	Result	Ref.
2015	Avengers: Age of Ultron	Teen Choice Awards	Choice Movie: Breakout Star	Nominated	
2016	Captain America: Civil War	Teen Choice Awards	Choice Movie: Chemistry (with cast)	Nominated	
2018	Avengers: Infinity War	MTV Movie & TV Awards	Best Fight (with cast)	Nominated	
2018	Avengers: Infinity War	Teen Choice Awards	Choice Action Movie Actress	Nominated	
2021	WandaVision	MTV Movie & TV Awards	Best Performance in a Show	Won	
2021	WandaVision	MTV Movie & TV Awards	Best Fight (with Kathryn Hahn)	Won	
2021	WandaVision	Hollywood Critics Association TV Awards	Best Actress in a Limited Series, Anthology Series, or Television Movie	Nominated	
2021	WandaVision	Dorian Awards	Best TV Performance	Nominated	
2021	WandaVision	Primetime Emmy Awards	Outstanding Lead Actress in a Limited or Anthology Series or Movie	Nominated	
2021	WandaVision	TCA Awards	Individual Achievement in Drama	Nominated	
2021	WandaVision	Golden Issue Award	Best TV Actress	Won	
2022	WandaVision	Golden Globes Awards	Golden Globe Award for Best Actress – Miniseries or Television Film	Nominated	
2022	WandaVision	Critics' Choice Super Awards	Best Actress in a Superhero Series	Won	
2022	WandaVision	Kids' Choice Awards	Favorite Female TV Star (Family)	Nominated	
2022	WandaVision	Saturn Awards	Best Actress in a Streaming Television Series	Nominated	
2022	Doctor Strange in the Multiverse of Madness	People's Choice Awards	Female Movie Star of 2022	Won	
2022	Doctor Strange in the Multiverse of Madness	People's Choice Awards	Action Movie Star of 2022	Won	
2023	Doctor Strange in the Multiverse of Madness	Kids Choice Awards	Favorite Movie Actress	Nominated	
2023	Doctor Strange in the Multiverse of Madness	Critics' Choice Super Awards	Best Actress in a Superhero Movie	Nominated	
2023	Doctor Strange in the Multiverse of Madness	Critics' Choice Super Awards	Best Villain in a Movie	Nominated	
2023	Doctor Strange in the Multiverse of Madness	MTV Movie & TV Awards	Best Villain	Won	

== See also ==
- Characters of the Marvel Cinematic Universe
