= Primetime Emmy Award for Outstanding Sound Editing for a Comedy or Drama Series (Half-Hour) and Animation =

Type of Emmy Award

Primetime Emmy Award for Sound Editing for a Comedy or Drama Series (Half-Hour) and Animation
- Awarded for: Outstanding Sound Editing for a Comedy or Drama Series (Half-Hour) and Animation
- Country: United States
- Presented by: Academy of Television Arts & Sciences
- Currently held by: Widow's Bay (2026)
- Website: emmys.com

The Primetime Emmy Award for Outstanding Sound Editing for a Comedy or Drama Series (Half-Hour) and Animation is an award handed out annually at the Creative Arts Emmy Awards. The category was instituted in 2018. Prior to its creation, one-hour and half-hour series competed together.

In the following list, the first titles listed in gold are the winners; those not in gold are nominees, which are listed in alphabetical order. The years given are those in which the ceremonies took place:

== Winners and nominations ==
=== 2010s ===
Year	Program	Episode	Nominees	Network
2018 (70th)
2018 (70th)	Atlanta	"Teddy Perkins"	Trevor Gates, Jason Dotts, David Barbee, Jordan McClain, Geordy Sincavage, Michael S. Head, Tara Blume and Matt Salib	FX
2018 (70th)	Ballers	"Bull Rush"	Mark Relyea, Julie Altus, Robert Guastini, David Barbee, Bruno Roussel, Joseph T. Sabella, Damien Smith	HBO
2018 (70th)	Barry	"Chapter Seven: Loud, Fast, and Keep Going"	Matthew E. Taylor, Sean Heissinger, Rickley W. Dumm, Michael Brake, Hilda Hodges, Rick Owens	HBO
2018 (70th)	Star Wars Rebels	"A World Between Worlds"	Matthew Wood, David Acord, Bonnie Wild, Sean Kiner, Ronni Brown, Margie O'Malley	Disney XD
2018 (70th)	Vice Principals	"The Union of the Wizard & the Warrior"	George Haddad, Dale Chaloukian, Karyn Foster, Chad J. Hughes, Marc Meyer, Jim Gallivan, Michael Brake, Louie Schultz, Gregg Barbanell, Nancy Parker	HBO
2019 (71st)
2019 (71st)	Barry	"ronny/lily"	Matthew E. Taylor, Sean Heissinger, Rickley W. Dumm, Mark Allen, John Creed, Harrison Meyle, Michael Brake, Clayton Weber, Alyson Dee Moore, Chris Moriana	HBO
2019 (71st)	Ballers	"This Is Not Our World"	Mark Relyea, David Barbee, Julie Altus, Chris Kahwaty, Bruno Roussel, Damien Smith, Joseph T. Sabella, Jesi Ruppel	HBO
2019 (71st)	Love, Death & Robots	"The Secret War"	Brad North, Craig Henighan, Jordan Wilby, Troy Prehmus, Jeff Charbonneau, Alicia Stevenson, Dawn Lunsford	Netflix
2019 (71st)	Russian Doll	"The Way Out"	Alex Soto, Thomas Ryan, Wen-Hsuan Tseng	Netflix
2019 (71st)	What We Do in the Shadows	"Werewolf Feud"	Steffan Falesitch, David Barbee, Angelina Faulkner, Steve Griffen, Sam Lewis, John Guentner, Paul Stevenson, Ellen Heuer	FX

=== 2020s ===
Year	Program	Episode	Nominees	Network
2020 (72nd)
2020 (72nd)	The Mandalorian	"Chapter 1: The Mandalorian"	David Acord, Matthew Wood, Bonnie Wild, James Spencer, Richard Quinn, Richard Gould, Stephanie McNally, Ryan Rubin, Ronni Brown, Jana Vance	Disney+
2020 (72nd)	GLOW	"The Libertines"	Robb Navrides, Colette Dahanne, Jason Lezama, David Beadle, Jason Krane, Larry Hopkins	Netflix
2020 (72nd)	Silicon Valley	"Exit Event"	Bobby Mackston, Sean Garnhart, Ryan Gierke, Joe Deveau, Vincent Guisetti	HBO
2020 (72nd)	Space Force	"The Launch"	Bobby Mackston, Paul Hammond, Sean Garnhart, Vincent Guisetti	Netflix
2020 (72nd)	What We Do in the Shadows	"The Return"	Steffan Falesitch, David Barbee, Angelina Faulkner, Steve Griffen, Sam C. Lewis, John Guentner, Ellen Heuer	FX
2021 (73rd)
2021 (73rd)	Love, Death & Robots	"Snow in the Desert"	Brad North, Craig Henighan, Dawn Lunsford, Jeff Charbonneau, Alicia Stevens	Netflix
2021 (73rd)	Cobra Kai	"December 19"	Patrick Hogan, Jesse Pomeroy, Daniel Salas, Ryne Gierke, AJ Shapiro, Andres Locsey, Shane Bruce, Mitchell Kohen	Netflix
2021 (73rd)	Mythic Quest	"Everlight"	Matthew E. Taylor, Sean Heissinger, Pete Nichols, Matthew Wilson, David Jobe, Joe Deveau, Jody Holwadel Thomas, Elizabeth Rainey	Apple TV+
2021 (73rd)	Star Trek: Lower Decks	"No Small Parts"	James Lucero, James Singleton, Jeff Halbert, Michael Britt, Amber Funk	Paramount+
2021 (73rd)	Ted Lasso	"The Hope That Kills You"	Brent Findley, Bernard Weiser, Kip Smedley, Richard David Brown, Sharyn Gersh, Jordan McClain, Sanaa Kelley, Matt Salib	Apple TV+
2022 (74th)
2022 (74th)	Barry	"starting now"	Sean Heissinger, Matthew E. Taylor, John Creed, Rickley W. Dumm, Clay Weber, Darrin Mann, Michael Brake, Alyson Dee Moore, Chris Moriana	HBO
2022 (74th)	Arcane	"When These Walls Come Tumbling Down"	Brad Beaumont, Eliot Connors, Shannon Beaumont, Alex Ephraim, Alexander Temple, Alex Seaver, Dan O'Connell, John Cucci	Netflix
2022 (74th)	Cobra Kai	"The Rise"	Patrick Hogan, Daniel Salas, Jesse Pomeroy, Gary DeLeone, Nick Papalia, Andres Locsey, Mitchell Kohen	Netflix
2022 (74th)	Love, Death & Robots	"In Vaulted Halls Entombed"	Brad North, Craig Henighan, Matt Manselle, Matt Telsey, Brian Straub	Netflix
2022 (74th)	Ted Lasso	"Beard After Hours"	Brent Findley, Bernard Weiser, Ashley Harvey, Kip Smedley, Mark Cleary, Jordan McClain, Sharyn Gersh, Richard David Brown, Sanaa Kelley, Matt Salib	Apple TV+
2022 (74th)	What We Do in the Shadows	"The Escape"	Steffan Falesitch, Chris Kahwaty, David Barbee, John Guentner, Sam Lewis, Steve Griffen, Ellen Heuer	FX
2023 (75th)
2023 (75th)	The Bear	"Review"	Steve "Major" Giammaria, Evan Benjamin, Jonathan Fuhrer, Annie Taylor, Chris White, Leslie Bloome, Shaun Brennan	FX
2023 (75th)	Barry	"wow"	Sean Heissinger, Matthew E. Taylor, John Creed, Rickley W. Dumm, Deron Street, Clay Weber, Michael Brake, Darrin Mann, Alyson Dee Moore, Chris Moriana	HBO
2023 (75th)	The Mandalorian	"Chapter 24: The Return"	Matthew Wood, Trey Turner, Brad Semenoff, David W. Collins, Luis Galdames, Stephanie McNally, Nicholas Fitzgerald, Joel Raabe, Shelley Roden	Disney+
2023 (75th)	Reservation Dogs	"This Is Where the Plot Thickens"	Patrick Hogan, David Beadle, Sonya Lindsay, Michael Sana, Daniel Salas, Amber Funk, Lena Krigen, Illia Popel & Danylo Gomlez	FX
2023 (75th)	What We Do in the Shadows	"The Night Market"	Steffan Falesitch, Aaron Diecker, David Barbee, Steve Griffen, John Guentner, Sam Lewis, Ellen Heuer	FX
2024 (76th)
2024 (76th)	The Bear	"Forks"	Steve "Major" Giammaria, Andrea Bella, Evan Benjamin, Jonathan Fuhrer, Annie Taylor, Jason Lingle, Jeff Lingle, Leslie Bloome, Shaun Brennan	FX
2024 (76th)	Ahsoka	"Part Four: Fallen Jedi"	Matthew Wood, Bonnie Wild, David Acord, James Spencer, Vanessa Lapato, Stephanie McNally, Trey Turner, Kimberly Patrick, Tim Farrell, Joel Raabe, Chris Tergesen, Ronni Brown, Heikki Kossi, Shelley Roden	Disney+
2024 (76th)	Blue Eye Samurai	"All Evil Dreams and Angry Words"	Myron Nettinga, Paulette Lifton, Sam Hayward, Jared Dwyer, Andrew Miller, Johanna Turner, Justin Helle, Iko Kagasoff, Stefan Fraticelli, Jason Charbonneau	Netflix
2024 (76th)	Only Murders in the Building	"Sitzprobe"	Mathew Waters, Danika Wikke, Taylor Jackson, Meredith Stacy, Erika Koski, Micha Liberman, Sanaa Kelley, Iris Dutour	Hulu
2024 (76th)	Star Trek: Lower Decks	"The Inner Fight"	James Lucero, Drew Guy, Mak Kellerman, John Wynn, Michael Britt, Amber Funk	Paramount+
2025 (77th)	Outstanding Sound Editing for an Animated Program			
2025 (77th)	Arcane	"The Dirt Under Your Nails"	Brad Beaumont, Eliot Connors, Stephen P. Robinson, Janet "PJ" Pascual, Dan O'Connell, John Cucci	Netflix
2025 (77th)	Love, Death & Robots	"400 Boys"	Bradley North, Craig Henighan, Matt Manselle, Matt Telsey, Brian Straub	Netflix
2025 (77th)	Secret Level	"Warhammer 40,000: And They Shall Know No Fear"	Matt Yocum, Bradley North, Nolan McNaughton, Ryan Sullivan, Joseph Fraioli, Christopher Battaglia, Harry Cohen, Matt Manselle, Matt Telsey, Brian Straub	Prime Video
2025 (77th)	Star Trek: Lower Decks	"The New Next Generation"	James Lucero, Drew Guy, Konrad Piñon, James Singleton, John Wynn, Amber Funk, Michael Britt	Paramount+
2025 (77th)	What If...?	"What If... 1872?"	Mac Smith, Vanessa Lapato, Alyssa Nevarez, Steve Bissinger, Derek McGinley, Anele Onyekwere, Carl Sealove, Andrea Stelter Gard, Sean England	Disney+
2025 (77th)	Outstanding Sound Editing for a Comedy or Drama Series (Half-Hour)			
2025 (77th)	The Studio	"The Golden Globes"	George Haddad, Borja Sau, Lloyd Stuart Martin, Randy Wilson, Justin Helle, Lorena Perez Batista, Jason Charbonneau, Stefan Fraticelli	Apple TV+
2025 (77th)	The Acolyte	"Night"	Brian Chumney, Kimberly Patrick, Angela Ang, David Chrastka, Dee Selby, Alistair Hawkins, Goro Koyama	Disney+
2025 (77th)	Agatha All Along	"Darkest Hour / Wake Thy Power"	Kim Foscato, Paula Fairfield, Richard Gould, Daniel Laurie, Jacob Riehle, Andre J.H. Zweers, Kim B. Christensen, Fernand Bos, Mary Parker, Jana Vance, Ronni Brown	Disney+
2025 (77th)	The Bear	"Doors"	Steve "Major" Giammaria, Craig LoGiudice, Evan Benjamin, John Bowen, Jonathan Fuhrer, Matt Snedecor, Annie Taylor, Jeff Lingle, Jason Lingle, Leslie Bloome, Shaun Brennan	FX
2025 (77th)	The Righteous Gemstones	"Prelude"	Nicholas Renbeck, Alexa Zimmerman, Deborah Wallach, Rachel Wardell, Ailin Gong, Michael Brake, Tommy Stang	HBO
2026 (78th)
2026 (78th)	Widow's Bay	"What to Expect on Your Trip"	Matt Yocum, Sang Kim, Goeun Everett, Ryan Sullivan, Nick Seaman, Nate Underkuffler, Leslie Bloome, Shaun Brennan	Apple TV
2026 (78th)	A Knight of the Seven Kingdoms	"In the Name of the Mother"	Alastair Sirkett, Martin Cantwell, Michele Woods, Adéle Fletcher, Ruth Knight, Neil Stemp, Louise Burton, Barnaby Smyth, Rebecca Glover	HBO
2026 (78th)	Murderbot	"All Systems Red"	Tyler Whitham, Danielle McBride, Ève Corrêa-Guedes, Craig MacLellan, Marcelle Simpson, Nicholas Fitzgerald, John Elliot	Apple TV
2026 (78th)	Predator: Killer of Killers		Chris Terhune, William Files, James Miller, Justin M. Davey, Lee Gilmore, Jessie Anne Spence, Daniel DiPrima, Stephen Perone, Adam DeCoster, Noel Vought	Hulu
2026 (78th)	Star Wars: Maul – Shadow Lord	"Chapter 10: The Dark Lord"	David W. Collins, Kevin Bolen, Bill Rudolph, Michael Brinkman, Frank Rinella, Kimberly Patrick, Eli Denson	Disney+

== Programs with multiple wins ==
2 wins

- Barry
- The Bear

== Programs with multiple nominations ==
4 nominations

- Barry
- Love, Death & Robots
- What We Do in the Shadows

3 nominations

- The Bear
- The Mandalorian (Note: Total includes The Mandalorian’s nomination for Sound Editing for a Comedy or Drama Series (One-Hour).)
- Star Trek: Lower Decks

2 nominations

- Arcane
- Ballers
- Cobra Kai
- Ted Lasso
