= Mayans M.C. season 1 =

American TV show season

Mayans M.C.
- Season 1
- Promotional poster
- Starring: J. D. Pardo; Clayton Cardenas; Sarah Bolger; Michael Irby; Carla Baratta; Richard Cabral; Raoul Max Trujillo; Antonio Jaramillo; Danny Pino; Edward James Olmos
- No. of episodes: 10

Release
- Original network: FX
- Original release: September 4 – November 6, 2018

Season chronology
- Next → Season 2

The first season of the American television drama series Mayans M.C. premiered on September 4, 2018 and concluded on November 6, 2018, after 10 episodes aired on cable network FX. Mayans M.C. is an American crime drama television series created by Kurt Sutter and Elgin James. The show takes place in the same fictional universe as Sons of Anarchy and deals with the Sons' rivals-turned-allies, the Mayans Motorcycle Club.

== Plot ==
Mayans M.C. takes place two and a half years after the events of Sons of Anarchy and is set hundreds of miles away, in the fictional California border town of Santo Padre. The series focuses on the struggles of Ezekiel "EZ" Reyes, a prospect in the Mayans M.C. charter. EZ is the gifted son of a proud Mexican family, whose American dream was snuffed out by cartel violence. Now, his need for vengeance drives him toward a life he never intended and can never escape.

== Production ==
=== Development ===
On May 11, 2016, it was announced that FX had begun formal script development on a spinoff of the television series Sons of Anarchy. The long-rumored offshoot, entitled Mayans M.C., was created by Kurt Sutter and Elgin James, with James writing the pilot script and both executive producing. Production companies announced as being involved with the series included Fox 21 Television Studios and FX Productions. On December 1, 2016, FX officially gave the production a pilot order. It was also announced that Sutter would direct the series' pilot episode.

On July 5, 2017, it was announced that the pilot would be undergoing reshoots and Norberto Barba would be replacing Sutter as director of the episode, as Sutter planned to exclusively focus on writing the episode. Additionally, it was reported that various roles would be recast and Barba would also be serving as an executive producer.

On January 5, 2018, FX announced at the annual Television Critics Association's winter press tour that the production had been given a series order for a first season consisting of ten episodes. On June 28, 2018, it was reported that the series would premiere on September 4, 2018. On October 1, 2018, it was announced that FX had renewed the series for a second season.

=== Casting ===
In February 2017, it was announced that Edward James Olmos, John Ortiz, J. D. Pardo, and Antonio Jaramillo had been cast in lead roles in the pilot. In March 2017, it was reported that Richard Cabral, Sarah Bolger, Jacqueline Obradors, and Andrea Londo had also been cast. In October 2017, it was announced that Michael Irby and Raoul Trujillo had been cast in series regular roles. In November 2016, it was reported that Emilio Rivera would be reprising his role of Marcus Álvarez from Sons of Anarchy in the series. On April 25, 2017, it was announced that Carla Baratta would be replacing Andrea Londo in the role of Adelita. Additionally, it was reported that Maurice Compte had been cast in a potentially recurring role. On May 1, 2017, it was reported that Efrat Dor would joining the cast in a potentially recurring capacity. In October 2017, it was announced that Danny Pino and Vincent “Rocco” Vargas had been cast in the pilot with Pino in a starring role. In April 2018, it was announced that Gino Vento and Tony Plana had been cast in recurring roles. On July 22, 2018, Sutter revealed in an interview with Deadline Hollywood that Ortiz and his character had been replaced by Irby and his character during the reshoots of the pilot episode.

=== Filming ===
Principal photography for the pilot episode was expected to begin in March 2017. In July 2017, it was reported that the pilot would undergo reshoots that would take place in late summer 2017. Those reshoots reportedly began during the week of October 23, 2017 in Los Angeles.

== Cast and characters ==
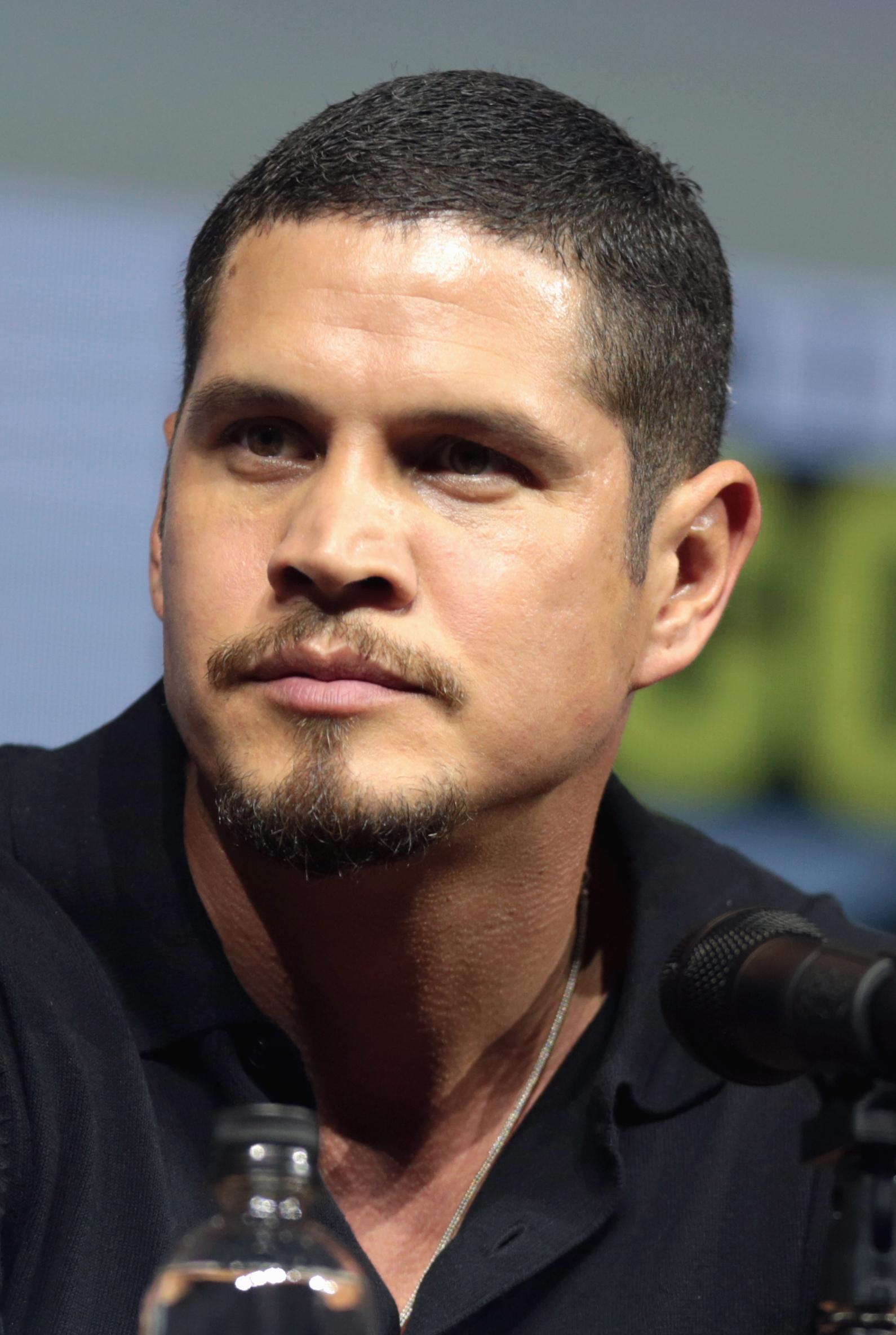
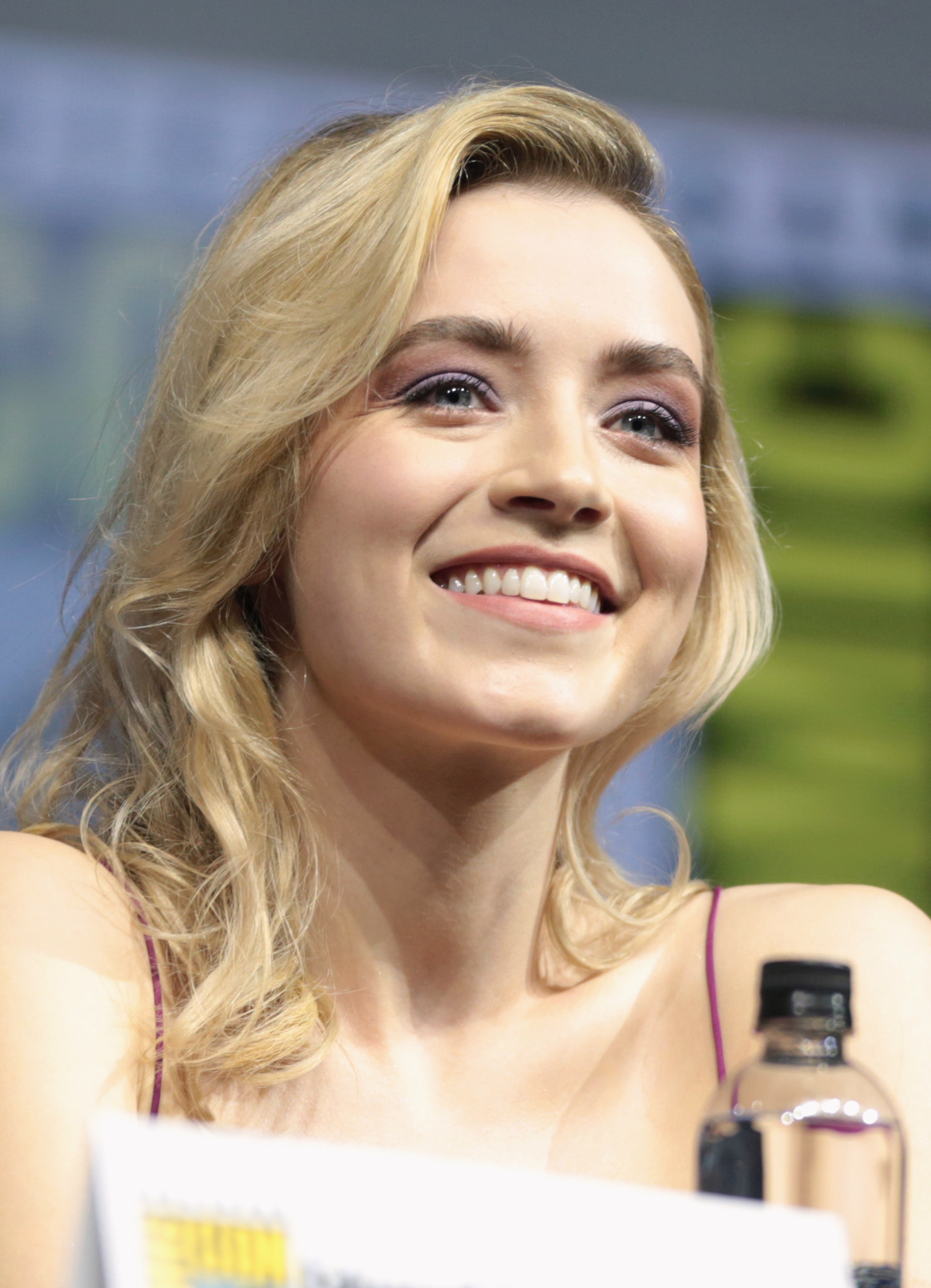
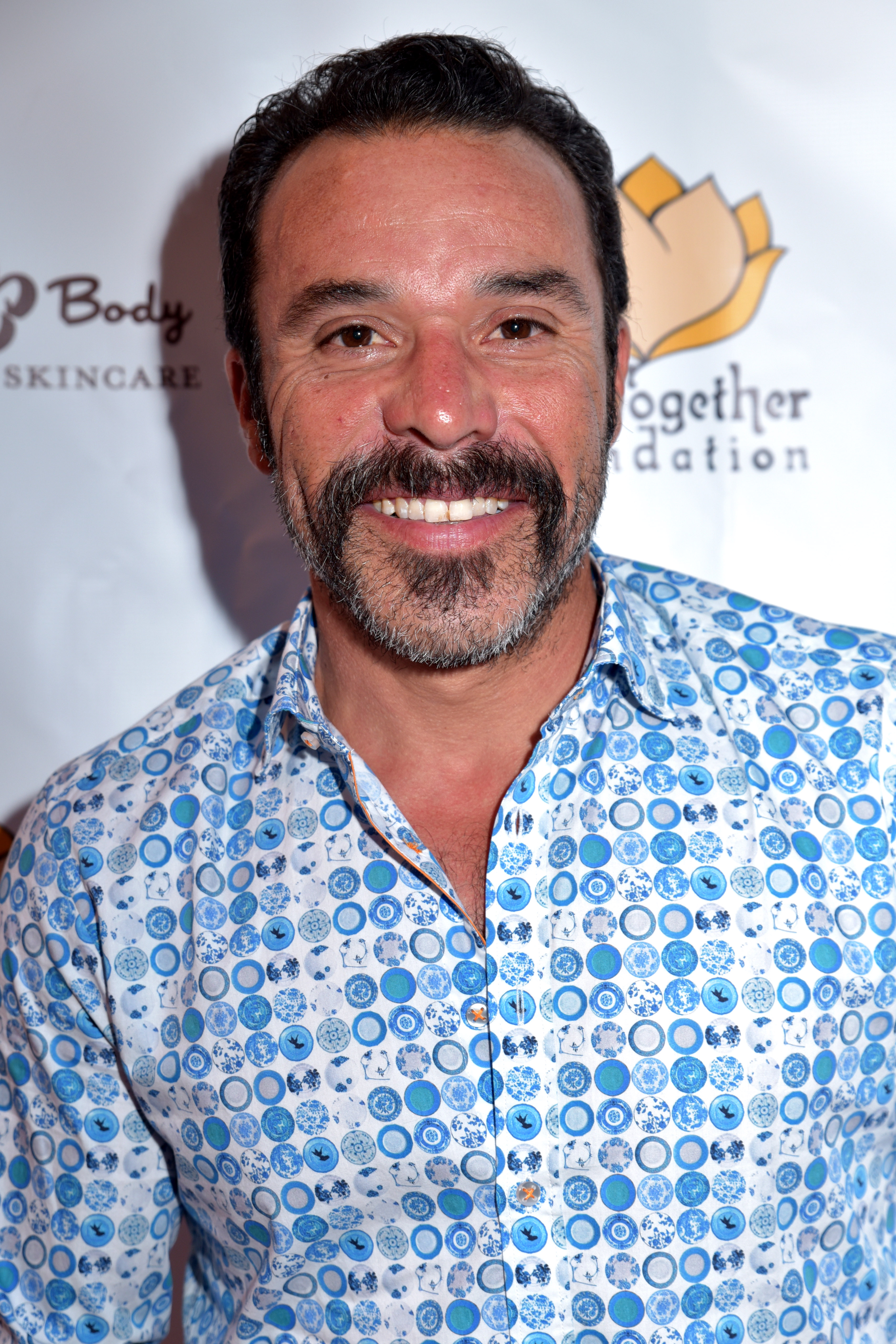
J. D. Pardo (Ezekiel "EZ" Reyes), Sarah Bolger (Emily Thomas), and Michael Irby (Obispo "Bishop" Losa)
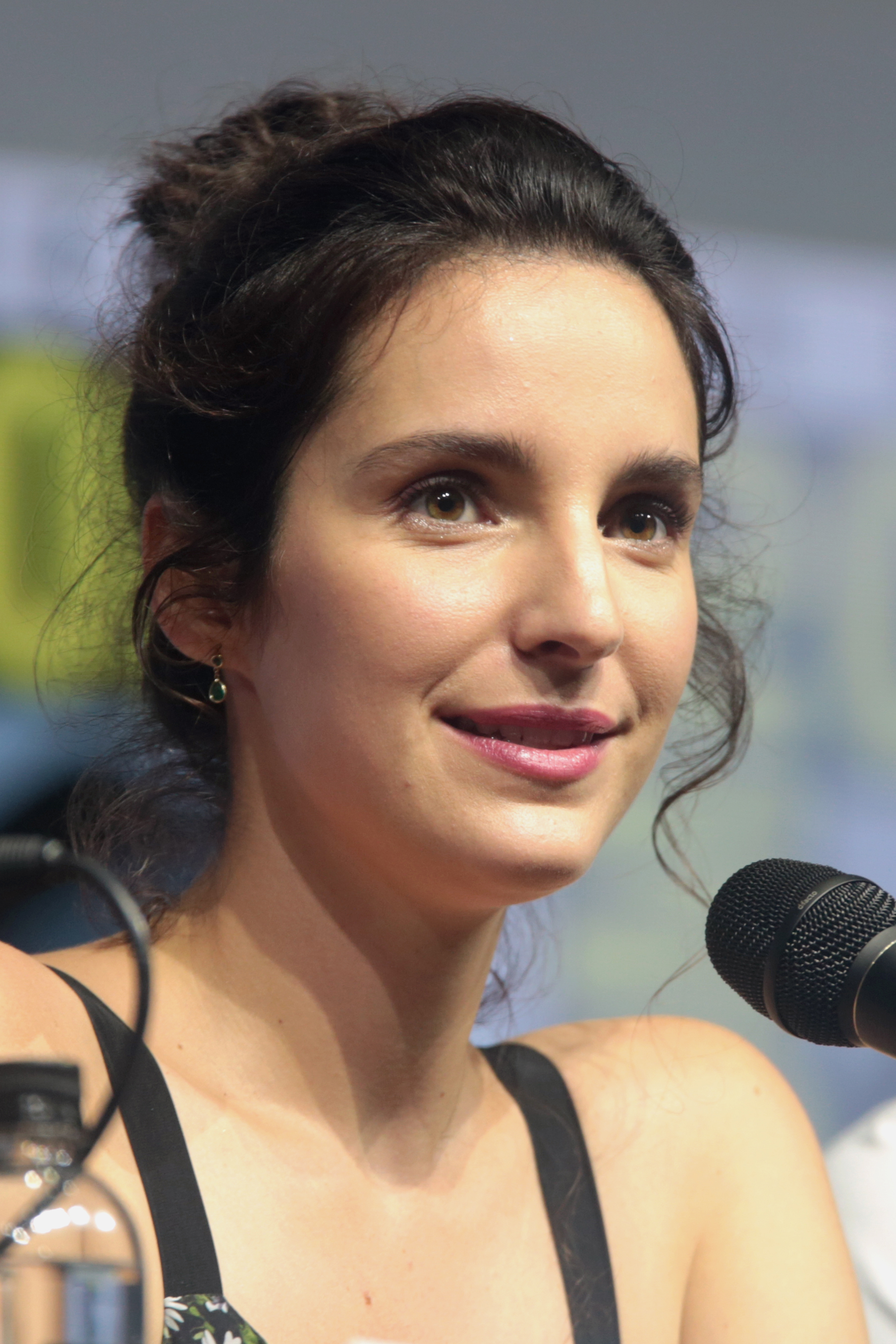
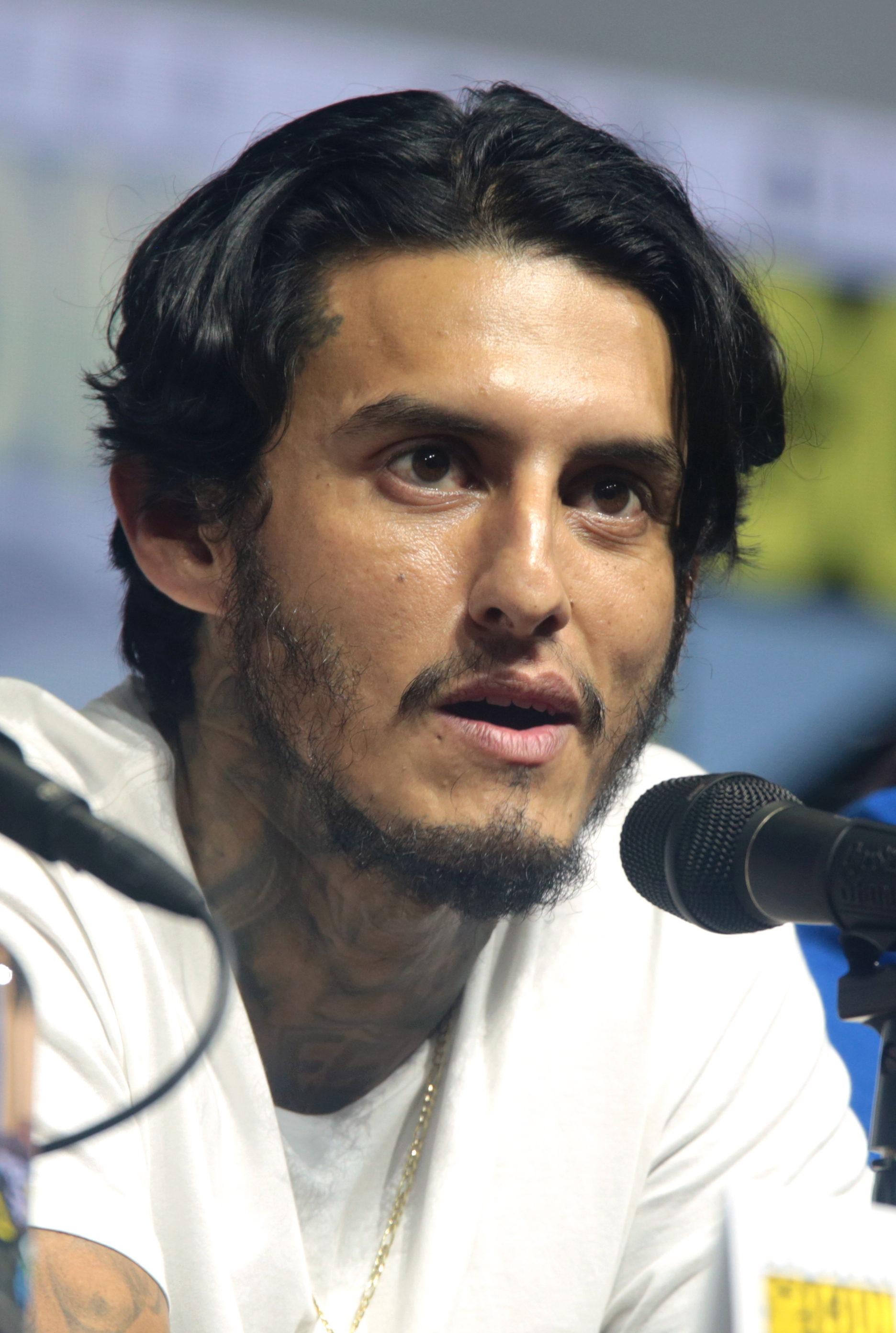
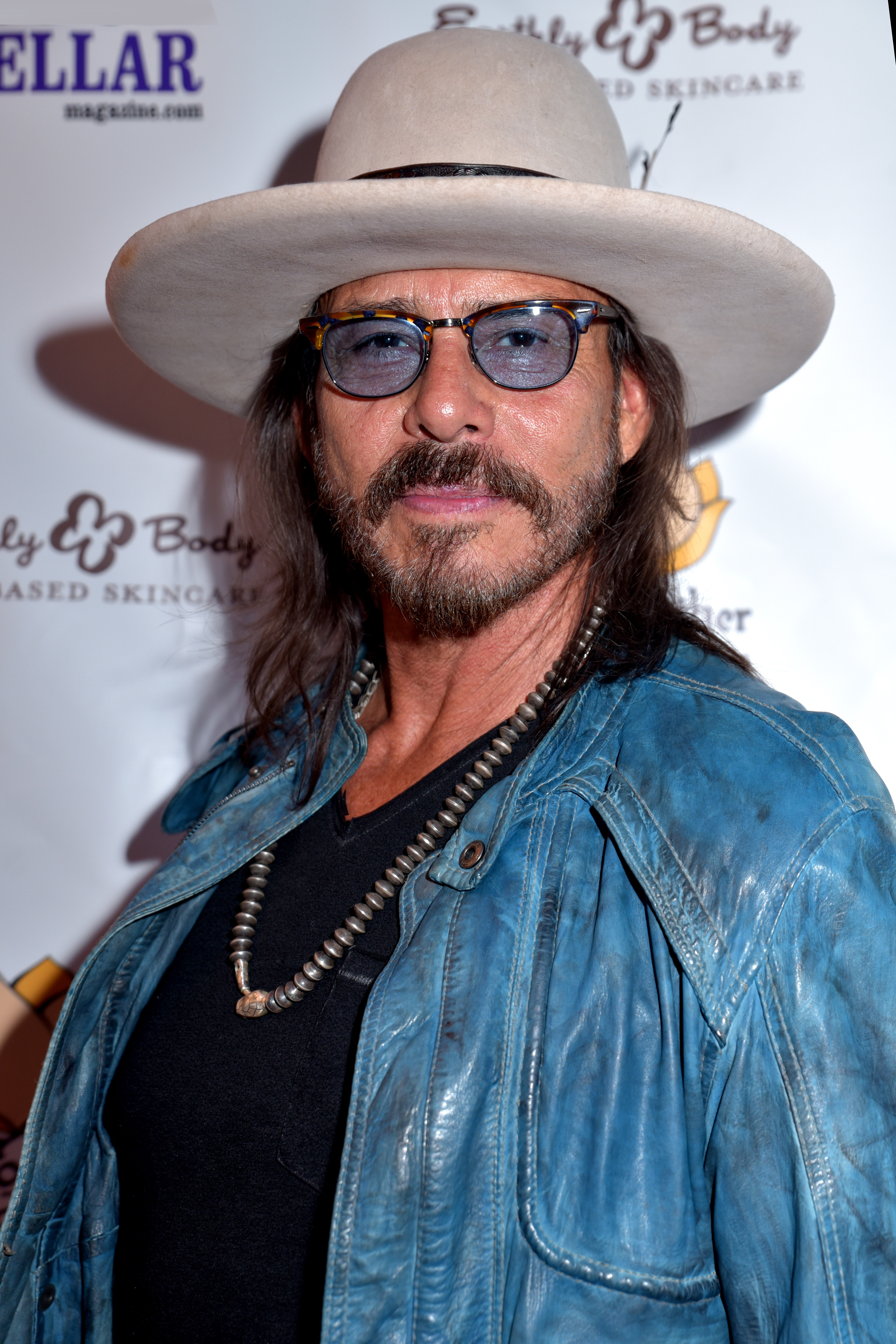
Carla Baratta (Adelita), Richard Cabral (Johnny "El Coco" Cruz), and Raoul Trujillo (Che "Taza" Romero)

=== Main ===
- J. D. Pardo as Ezekiel "EZ" Reyes, prospect for the Mayans M.C and brother to Angel Reyes.
- Clayton Cardenas as Angel Reyes, Ezekiel's brother and full patch member of the Mayans M.C.
- Sarah Bolger as Emily Thomas, childhood sweetheart of Ezekiel, who is now married to Miguel Galindo, and the mother of their infant son.
- Michael Irby as Obispo "Bishop" Losa, president of Mayans M.C.'s Santo Padre Charter.
- Carla Baratta as Adelita, who as a child, watched her family die at the hands of the Galindo cartel.
- Richard Cabral as Johnny "El Coco" Cruz, a full patch member of Mayans M.C.
- Raoul Trujillo as Che "Taza" Romero, Vice Presidente of Mayans M.C., Santo Padre Charter.
- Antonio Jaramillo as Michael "Riz" Ariza, Él Secretario of Mayans M.C., Santo Padre Charter.
- Danny Pino as Miguel Galindo, the son of Galindo Cartel founder Jose Galindo.
- Edward James Olmos as Felipe Reyes, the once-strong Mexican patriarch and Angel and Ezekiel's father.

=== Special guests ===
- Emilio Rivera as Marcus Álvarez, President of the Mayans M.C. Oakland Charter, cousin of Obispo "Bishop" Losa, and the national president of the Mayan M.C., reprising his role from Sons of Anarchy.
- Robert Patrick as Les Packer, reprising his role from Sons of Anarchy. ("Perro/Oc")

=== Recurring ===
- Vincent Vargas as Gilberto "Gilly" Lopez, a good-natured MMA fighter who rides for the Santo Padre Chapter of the Mayans M.C.
- Frankie Loyal Delgado as Hank "El Tranq" Loza, Sergeant At Arms / El pacificador Full Patch Member of the Mayans M.C.
- Melony Ochoa as Mini
- Maurice Compte as Kevin Jimenez, a highly regarded DEA agent tasked to bring down Miguel Galindo, the Galindo Cartel kingpin.
- Tony Plana as Devante, consigliere to the Galindo Cartel that loyally served Jose Galindo and now mentors Miguel.
- Gino Vento as Nestor Oceteva, head of security for the Galindo Cartel and a childhood friend of Miguel Galindo.
- Ada Maris as Dita Galindo, Miguel's mother and widow of Jose Galindo
- Salvador Chacon as Pablo
- Alexandra Barreto as Antonia Pena, the mayor of Santo Padre and is married to Katrina.
- Joseph Raymond Lucero as Neron "Creeper" Vargas, an ex-junkie from Los Angeles and road captain of the Santo Padre charter.
- Michael Ornstein as Chuck "Chucky" Marstein, reprising his role from Sons of Anarchy.
- Edwin Hodge as Officer Franky Rogan
- Ray McKinnon as Lincoln Potter, reprising his role from Sons of Anarchy.

=== Guests ===
- Peter Navy Tuiasosopo as Afa ("Perro/Oc")
- Katey Sagal (uncredited) as Gemma Teller Morrow, reprising her role from Sons of Anarchy. ("Perro/Oc")
- Noel G. as Louie ("Escorpión/Dzec")
- Nomi Ruiz as Gracie ("Escorpión/Dzec")
- J. Larose as Adam ("Búho/Muwan")
- Barbara Williams as Alice Reed ("Murciélago/Zotz")
- David Labrava as Happy Lowman, reprising his role from Sons of Anarchy. ("Cuervo/Tz'ikb'uul")
- Rusty Coones as Rane Quinn ("Cuervo/Tz'ikb'uul")

== Episodes ==
No. overall	No. in season	Title (Note: Most of the episode titles follow a pattern made up of two names; the first in Spanish and the second, divided by a slash, refers to the Haabʼ and Tzolkʼin (Chol Qʼij in Kʼicheʼ and Mayan) calendars. When naming episodes, creators Kurt Sutter and Elgin James are utilizing what each episode features, and/or which symbolic animal will be present in that episode.)	Directed by	Written by	Original release date	Prod. code	U.S. viewers (millions)
1	1	"Perro/Oc"	Norberto Barba	Kurt Sutter & Elgin James	September 4, 2018	1WBD78	2.53
Ezekiel "EZ" Reyes joins the Mayans M.C. as a prospect, but he still has to prove himself to his seniors.
2	2	"Escorpión/Dzec"	Norberto Barba	Kurt Sutter	September 11, 2018	1WBD02	2.01
The Mayans seek answers from a local crew as the Galindo worlds north and south of the border collide.
3	3	"Búho/Muwan"	Guy Ferland	Sean Tretta & Andrea Ciannavei	September 18, 2018	1WBD03	2.10
The M.C. alliances are tested; the Galindo family adopts unconventional methods.
4	4	"Murciélago/Zotz"	Hanelle Culpepper	Kurt Sutter & Santa Sierra	September 25, 2018	1WBD04	1.53
A new threat in Santo Padre presents the Mayans new obstacles and opportunities.
5	5	"Uch/Opossum"	Batán Silva	Bryan Gracia	October 2, 2018	1WBD05	1.39
A new deal requires a dangerous favor in Santa Madre.
6	6	"Gato/Mis"	Félix Enríquez Alcalá	Debra Moore Muñoz	October 9, 2018	1WBD06	1.35
EZ continues to prove his worth as a prospect as both sides of the border must grapple with harsh realities.
7	7	"Cucaracha/K'uruch"	Rachel Goldberg	Elgin James	October 16, 2018	1WBD07	1.29
New secrets are brought to light, putting the M.C. at odds.
8	8	"Rata/Ch'o"	Peter Weller	Andrea Ciannavei & Kurt Sutter	October 23, 2018	1WBD08	1.22
EZ's past continues to haunt him, but present horrors give him a new perspective.
9	9	"Serpiente/Chikchan"	Norberto Barba	Sean Tretta & Kurt Sutter	October 30, 2018	1WBD09	1.23
The bond of the Reyes blood is fractured, and the Galindo family decides to cut its losses.
10	10	"Cuervo/Tz'ikb'uul"	Elgin James	Kurt Sutter	November 6, 2018	1WBD10	1.31
The club has reason to celebrate, but big changes leave the future uncertain.

== Reception ==
=== Critical response ===
The first season was met with a mixed to positive response from critics. On the review aggregation website Rotten Tomatoes, the first season holds a 72% approval rating with an average rating of 6.43 out of 10 based on 36 reviews. The website's critical consensus reads, "Mayans M.C. is a thrilling drama with compelling characters, but it struggles to find its pace and the Tellers are hard to forget." On Metacritic, the season has a score of 57 out of 100, based on 19 critics, indicating "mixed or average" reviews.

=== Ratings ===
Viewership and ratings per episode of Mayans M.C. season 1
No.	Title	Air date	Rating (18–49)	Viewers (millions)	DVR (18–49)	DVR viewers (millions)	Total (18–49)	Total viewers (millions)
1	"Perro/Oc"	September 4, 2018	1.1	2.53	1.0	2.51	2.1	5.05
2	"Escorpión/Dzec"	September 11, 2018	0.8	2.01	1.1	2.62	1.9	4.64
3	"Búho/Muwan"	September 18, 2018	0.8	2.10	0.9	2.12	1.7	4.23 (Note: Live +7 ratings were not available, so Live +3 ratings have been used instead.)
4	"Murciélago/Zotz"	September 25, 2018	0.6	1.53	0.7	1.74	1.3	3.27
5	"Uch/Opossum"	October 2, 2018	0.6	1.39	1.0	2.35	1.6	3.74
6	"Gato/Mis"	October 9, 2018	0.5	1.35	0.9	2.12	1.4	3.47
7	"Cucaracha/K'uruch"	October 16, 2018	0.5	1.29	0.8	1.76	1.3	3.05
8	"Rata/Ch'o"	October 23, 2018	0.5	1.22	0.7	1.77	1.2	2.99
9	"Serpiente/Chikchan"	October 30, 2018	0.5	1.23	0.8	1.73	1.3	2.96
10	"Cuervo/Tz'ikb'uul"	November 6, 2018	0.5	1.31	0.7	1.71	1.2	3.02
