= Rachel Goldberg =

American film and television director

Rachel Goldberg is an American film and television director, writer, and professor specializing in film and media arts. She is recognized for her independent short films and her recent contributions to directing within the genre television sphere.

== Early life and education ==
Goldberg graduated as a member of the University of Pennsylvania class of 1996 with a BA in Theatre and Psychology. Following graduation Goldberg pursued theatre, collaborating with fellow graduates to independently produce a four-part theatrical summer series with each person directing one play while serving as the cast and crew for the other productions. Goldberg then attended the California Institute of the Arts where she earned an interdisciplinary MFA in Directing for Film, Theatre and Television. It was here where Goldberg found her affinity for film and decided to pursue film and television directing in addition to theatre, which she calls her first love.

== Career ==
Goldberg began her career writing and directing experimental theatre, and continues that work along with her work in film and television. Goldberg's short films centred marginalized voices, dealing with themes of social justice, racial bias and societal inequality, abuse, and the transformative power of unlikely friendships. Since transitioning to directing episodic television in 2017, Goldberg has worked on over a dozen productions encompassing a range of genres including comic book, horror, true crime, mystery, and fantasy. Due to her work on Raising Dion and American Horror Story, Goldberg was recognized as one of 20 emerging female directors primed for studio projects by the Alice Initiative in 2020.

=== Film ===
Goldberg made her film directorial debut with Man, Where's My Shoe? in 2004. The 22 minute short was co-directed with at-risk teenage girls involved with a Los Angeles-based non-profit, Goldberg acted as their directing mentor and producer.

As one of eight women selected for 2010–2011 class of the American Film Institute's Directing Workshop for Women, Goldberg directed and cowrote her third short film Neighbors. Jonathan Pope Evans wrote the initial screenplay, based on a reclusive mutual friend, before collaborating with Goldberg on subsequent drafts specifically for the program. The following year, Goldberg was selected for Film Independent’s Project Involve where she wrote and directed Rosita Lopez for President. Her next project, MUTED, began as a Kickstarter campaign created by scriptwriter Brandi Nicole. The film premiered at the 18th annual American Black Film Festival in June 2014 to critical acclaim, receiving the HBO Short Film Award and $10,000 grand prize. The film aired on HBO in February 2015 to honour of Black History Month. Also in 2014, Goldberg was selected for the 16th annual Film Independent Screenwriting Lab for her feature-length screenplay Transformation Awaits based on her 2012 short film, Neighbors. Again, Goldberg collaborated with Jonathan Pope Evans to write the script that would become an academy's Nicholl Fellowship quarterfinalist and win the Grand Prize for LGBTQ screenplay at the 2014 Rhode Island International Film Festival.

=== Television ===
In 2016, Ryan Murphy launched his Half initiative with the goal of achieving directorial gender and racial parity in his television productions. The next year, Goldberg made her television debut directing episode seven of American Horror Story: Cult. Prior to this, Goldberg, along with other Half directors, struggled to break into the world of episodic television and feature films with productions companies and networks unwilling to give female directors their first major project. In a 2017 panel hosted by FX Networks, the women credited Murphy for initiating them into the world of high budget productions, noting that with a major project under their belt, opportunities began to materialize like never before.

Following her experience directing under Half, Goldberg continued her genre television career directing episodes of Veronica Mars, Raising Dion, and Cloak & Dagger in 2019. In 2021, Goldberg directed the first two episodes of Grendel, a Netflix series based on Matt Wagner's comic book series of the same name, written and produced by Andrew Dabb. Goldberg and Dabb worked together previously on Netflix's Resident Evil. The series was cancelled while completing its filming in 2022, leaving the partially complete eight-episode season in post production limbo with the option to shop the series to other distributors.

In early 2023, it was announced that Goldberg was tapped by Marvel to direct the WandaVision spin-off, Agatha All Along alongside head writer and executive producer Jac Schaeffer and Wednesday director Gandja Monteiro. The show completed filming prior to the Writers Guild of America and SAG-AFTRA strike but had its released pushed back to the lead-up to Halloween 2024.

In July 2023, The Hollywood Reporter announced Goldberg's feature directorial debut with action comedy, The BM, written by Family Guy alum Shawn Ries and Artie Johann.

=== Academia ===
In 2015, Goldberg joined the faculty of Chapman University's Dodge College of Film and Media Arts where she taught courses on story telling through film. In 2019, Goldberg and fellow film professor Christine Fugate established The Female Gaze Film Festival to celebrate and share media with a female perspective.

== Filmography ==
Short film

Year	Title	Director	Producer	Writer
2004	Man, Where's My Shoe?	Yes	Yes	No
2007	Bottle Rockets	Yes	No	No
2012	Neighbors	Yes	No	Yes
2012	Rosita Lopez for President	Yes	No	Yes
2014	Muted	Yes	No	No
2015	Francisco y David	No	Associate	No
2017	Bettas	No	Executive	No
2017	Alpha	No	Executive	No

Television

Year	Title	Episode(s)
2017	American Horror Story: Cult	"Valerie Solanas Died for Your Sins: Scumbag"
2018–2021	Mayans M.C.	"Cucaracha/K'uruch" "Xquic" "Overreaching Don't Pay"
2019	Cloak & Dagger	"Alignment Chart"
2019	Veronica Mars	"Heads You Lose"
2019	Raising Dion	"Issue #103: Watch Man" "Issue #104: Welcome to BIONA. Hope You Survive the Experience"
2020	The Sinner	"Part VII"
2021	American Gods	"Fire and Ice"
2022	Resident Evil	"Home Movies" "Revelations"
2022	Friend of the Family	"The Mission" "Articles of Faith"
2022	Grendel	"Devil by the Dead" "Baptism for the Devil"
2023	Gen V	"Jumanji"
2024	Agatha All Along	"Through Many Miles / Of Tricks and Trials" "If I Can't Reach You / Let My Song Teach You" "Darkest Hour / Wake Thy Power"

== Awards ==
Year	Nominated work	Award	Awarding body	Result	Shared with
2009	Bottle Rockets	Jury prize	Las Vegas International Film Festival	Won	Scott Sullivan · Jamon Scot
2012	Neighbors	Best Short Films by Women	Burbank International Film Festival	Won	
2012	Neighbors	Alternative Spirit Award	Rhode Island International Film Festival	Won	
2014	Neighbors	Best Narrative Short	Translations: The Seattle Transgender Film Festival	Won	
2014	Rosita Lopez for President	HB0 Jury Award	Miami Gay and Lesbian Film Festival	Nominated	Danni Conner
2014	Rosita Lopez for President	Best Live Action Short	NewFilmmakers Los Angeles	Nominated	
2014	Rosita Lopez for President	Overall Best Short	River Bend Film Festival, US	Won	
2014	Transformation Awaits	Best Screenplay	Rhode Island International Film Festival	Won	Jonathan Evans
2014	Muted	Director's Choice Award	Rhode Island International Film Festival	Won	Brandi Nicole · Tara Tomicevic
2014	Muted	Short Film Award	American Black Film Festival	Won	Brandi Nicole
2015	Welcome to Camelot	Best Screenplay	Rhode Island International Film Festival	Won	
2015	Muted	Outstanding Independent Short	Black Reel Award	Won	Brandi Nicole
2015	Muted	Special Jury Award	SoHo International Film Festival	Won	Brandi Nicole · Tara Tomicevic
2015	Muted	Grand Jury Award	SoHo International Film Festival	Won	
2015	Muted	Best Short Film	Minneapolis St. Paul International Film Festival	Won	Brandi Nicole
2015	Muted	Best Dramatic Short Film	Downtown Film Festival Los Angeles	Won	Brandi Nicole · Tara Tomicevic
2015	Neighbors	The Director List Award	Connect Film Festival, AUS	Won	
2015	Neighbors	Bechdel Award for Storytelling	Connect Film Festival, AUS	Nominated	
2015	Neighbors	Best Picture (Best Director, Best Writer & Best Producer)	Connect Film Festival, AUS	Nominated	Jonathan Evans · Bela Goldberg
2016	Welcome to Camelot	Donna Rothstein Excellence in Screenwriting Award	Garden State Film Festival	Won	
