= If I Can't Reach You / Let My Song Teach You =

- Agatha All Along episode
- Promotional poster for Agatha All Along, highlighting elements seen in this episode
- Episode no.: Episode 4
- Directed by: Rachel Goldberg
- Written by: Giovanna Sarquis
- Cinematography by: Caleb Heymann
- Editing by: David Egan
- Original release date: October 2, 2024
- Running time: 44 minutes

Cast
- Jade Quon as the Demon

Episode chronology
← Previous "Through Many Miles / Of Tricks and Trials"	Next → "Darkest Hour / Wake Thy Power"

"If I Can't Reach You / Let My Song Teach You" is the fourth episode of the American television miniseries Agatha All Along, based on Marvel Comics featuring the character Agatha Harkness. It follows Harkness, who has been stripped of her identity after the events of the miniseries WandaVision (2021), and her coven as they continue their journey down the Witches' Road in search of power. The episode is set in the Marvel Cinematic Universe (MCU), sharing continuity with the films of the franchise. It was written by Giovanna Sarquis and directed by Rachel Goldberg.

The episode delves into the second trial of the Witches' Road, focusing on Alice Wu-Gulliver's (Ali Ahn) generational curse and the resulting impact. The episode reintroduces Rio Vidal (Aubrey Plaza) to the ensemble cast, with an emphasis on her dynamic with Harkness (Kathryn Hahn). Apart from Ahn, Plaza and Hahn, Joe Locke, Sasheer Zamata, Debra Jo Rupp and Patti LuPone also star in the episode. Filming took place in the Atlanta metropolitan area and in Los Angeles.

"If I Can't Reach You / Let My Song Teach You" was released on the streaming service Disney+ on October 2, 2024. The episode was met with positive reviews from critics, with particular praise for Plaza's performance, the production design, and the scenes featuring Hahn and Plaza, although it drew some criticism for the narrative mechanics of the trial.

== Plot ==
On the Witches' Road, Alice Wu-Gulliver and Teen bury Sharon Davis. Agatha Harkness urges the coven to haste forward, but they refuse as they are missing a green witch needed for one of the trials. They resolve to call upon a replacement witch with a summoning spell and, much to Harkness' dismay, Rio Vidal rises from Davis' grave.

The coven comes across a house that Wu-Gulliver refuses to enter. Once they change direction, it reappears in their way. Upon entry, they are transported to a 1970s-style recording studio and appear in rock band attire. They discover the house is tied to Lorna Wu, a famous witch musician and Wu-Gulliver's late mother who was killed by the Wu family's generational curse. Inside a sound booth, Vidal approaches Harkness and they flirtatiously discuss betraying the group, but their conversation is overheard by the others. The Teen then plays a record that spins backwards, unleashing a curse. Lilia Calderu and Jennifer Kale are scorched by the curse until Wu-Gulliver protects them with a magic circle.

Realizing that the curse should have killed Wu-Gulliver years earlier, the coven deduces that Wu's well-known cover of "The Ballad of the Witches' Road" functions as a protective spell, sustained by its continual playback. To break the curse, they perform Wu's version of the song, causing the curse to manifest as a winged demon and set the house ablaze. Wu-Gulliver finishes the song with the others, destroying the curse for good.

Teen collapses from an injury sustained during the trial. The coven escapes to the Road, where, at Harkness' urging, Kale successfully heals him. While Teen recovers, he and Harkness discuss his sigil; Harkness claims not to know who cast it, noting that even the witch responsible would not remember. Meanwhile, the rest of the coven bond over their past experiences. When Harkness joins them, Vidal references their former romantic relationship. Later, Vidal confronts Harkness privately; when Harkness attempts to kiss her, Vidal stops her, stating that Teen does not belong to her.

== Production ==
=== Development ===
In May 2021, Jac Schaeffer, the head writer of WandaVision, signed a three-year overall television deal with Marvel Studios and 20th Television to create new projects for their Disney+ lineup. In pitches for several different projects focused on various characters, Schaeffer consistently suggested including WandaVision character Agatha Harkness, a powerful witch from Marvel Comics, as part of those series. This led to her and Marvel Studios president Kevin Feige pursuing a series centered on that character instead. By October 2021, a "dark comedy" spin-off from WandaVision centered on Kathryn Hahn as Agatha was in early development for Disney+ from Marvel Studios, with Schaeffer returning as head writer and executive producer.

During a Disney+ Day event in November 2021, the series was officially announced, with Schaeffer revealed to be directing episodes of the series a year later. By October 2023, Marvel Studios was changing its approach to television, hiring more traditional showrunners instead of head writers. Schaeffer was being credited as the series' showrunner by July 2024. Marvel Studios' Feige, Louis D'Esposito, Winderbaum and Mary Livanos served as executive producers. Released under Marvel Studios' Marvel Television label, Agatha All Along was later announced to be second in a trilogy of series that includes WandaVision and VisionQuest (2026).

=== Writing ===
According to Schaeffer, a "Fleetwood Mac, '70s, psychedelic" episode had been planned from the miniseries' initial conception because the "idea of the witchiness, specifically of that era" felt representative of the character of Agatha Harkness. In framing "The Ballad of the Witches' Road" as a popular in-world song, the writers took inspiration from works like "El Cóndor Pasa", citing it as an example of "artists taking folk songs and transforming them into pop songs".

=== Casting ===
The episode stars Kathryn Hahn as Agatha Harkness, Joe Locke as Teen, Sasheer Zamata as Jennifer Kale, Ali Ahn as Alice Wu-Gulliver, Patti LuPone as Lilia Calderu, Debra Jo Rupp as Sharon Davis and Aubrey Plaza as Rio Vidal. Jade Quon is featured as The Demon.

=== Design ===
Production designer John Collins cited architect Bruce Goff as a significant inspiration behind the creation of the recording studio set for his "organic architecture style that combined different elements like natural stone, woodwork, and stained glass". Maintaining a color scheme consistent with Alice Wu-Gulliver's designated fire element was integral to the design of the house. Developing Agatha Harkness' trial outfit, costume designer Daniel Selon was influenced by Fleetwood Mac and Patti Smith. Rio Vidal's outfit was inspired by Cher and featured flowers as a connection to her green witch origins. Jennifer Kale's outfit was conceived as a reference to Donna Sommer, Minnie Riperton and Diana Ross, while Lilia Calderu's look drew inspiration from Liza Minnelli. Alice's outift was based on John Lennon, Yoko Ono and Steven Tyler.

=== Filming ===
Locke compared the process of filming the musical number to "filming a music video". Most of the cast played their respective instruments for the coven's performance of "The Ballad of the Witches' Road" in the trial. To prepare for the scene, Plaza worked with a drum instructor for several weeks ahead of filming, while Zamata took bass lessons. Ahn already played the piano, and while she did not record the elements for the track, she relied on her knowledge to perform the part during the scene. The sequence utilized practical effects, including the fire and the demon, with certain movements achieved through wire work.

=== Music ===
In September 2024, Michael Paraskevas was revealed to have composed the series' score with Christophe Beck. It was released digitally by Marvel Music and Hollywood Records in two volumes: music from the first five episodes was released on October 11, 2024, and the music from the last four episodes was released on November 1, 2024. A soundtrack album was released on vinyl featuring all versions of "The Ballad of the Witches' Road", as well as selected tracks from the score, on October 30, 2024.

The episode features "The Ballad of the Witches' Road (Cover Version)", the third of several versions of the song performed across the series. Schaeffer envisioned the series with a song by Robert Lopez and Kristen Anderson-Lopez in mind as a successor to the impact of "Agatha All Along". Serving as both a narrative device and a thematic anchor, the "Ballad of the Witches' Road" incorporates lore and hidden clues in its lyrics, a result of close collaboration between the Lopezes and the writing team. Alterations were written into the lyrics of the cover version of The Ballad to reflect Alice Wu-Gulliver's story on a more personal level.

== Reception ==
=== Viewership ===
JustWatch, a guide to streaming content with access to data from more than 40 million users around the world, reported Agatha All Along as the fifth most-streamed series in the U.S. for the week of the episode's release. Whip Media, which tracks viewership data for more than 25 million worldwide users of its TV Time app, revealed the show was the second most-streamed original series in the U.S. for the week ending October 6.

=== Critical response ===
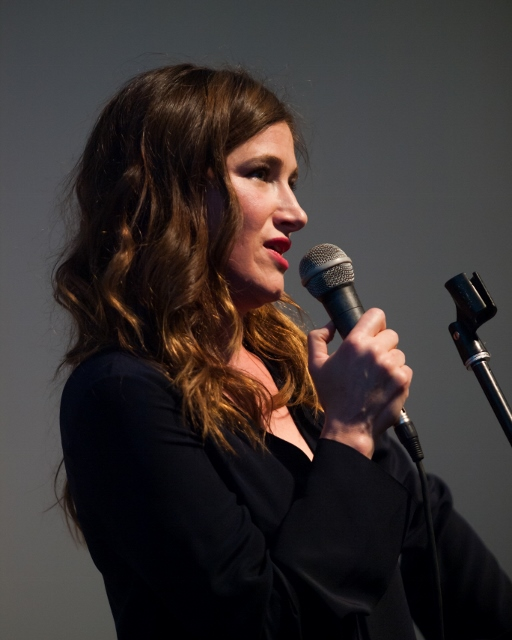
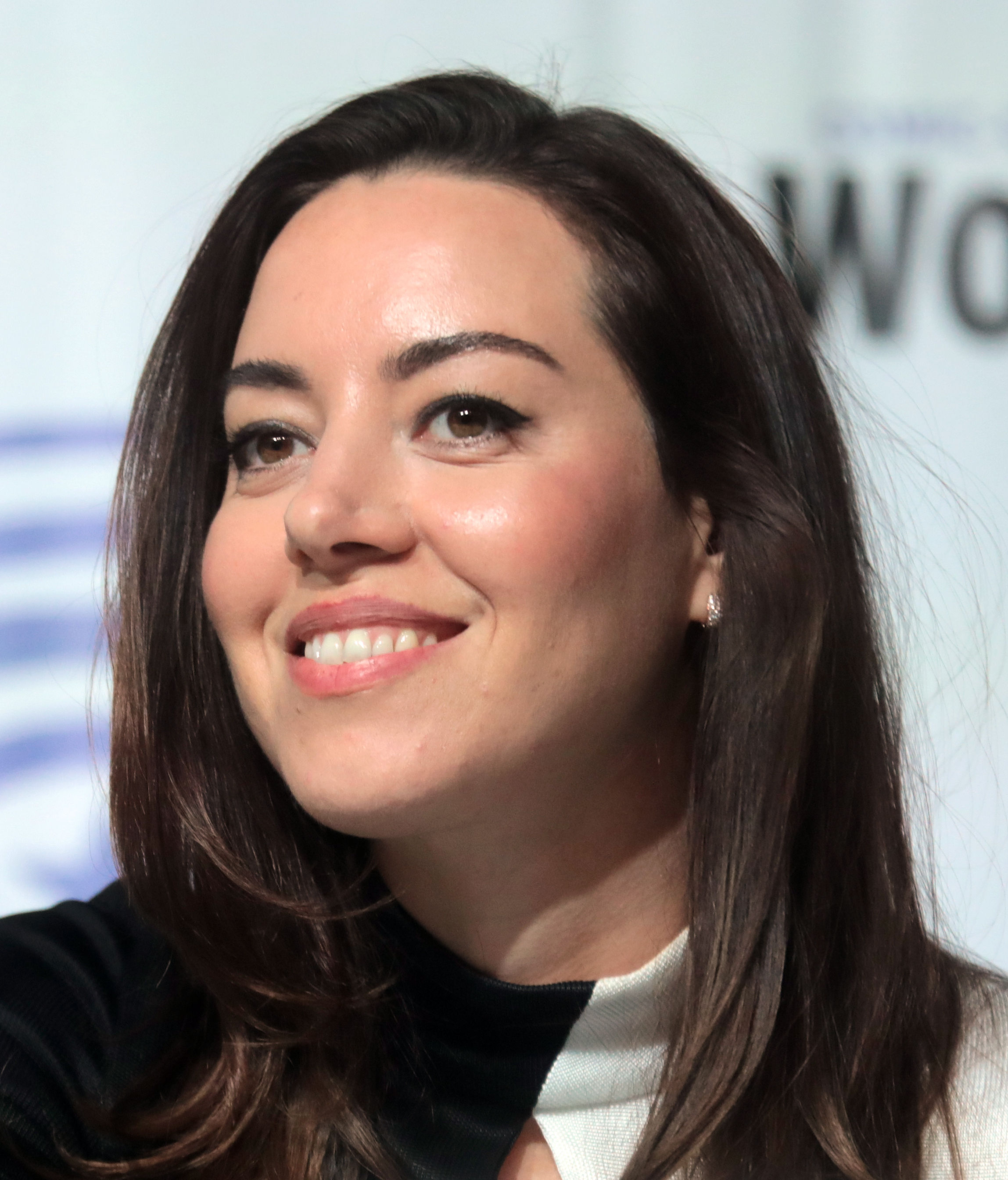
Kathryn Hahn (left) and Aubrey Plaza (right) received critical praise for their chemistry in "If I Can't Reach You / Let My Song Teach You."

The review aggregator website Rotten Tomatoes reported an 83% approval rating based on twelve reviews. The site's critical consensus reads, "If I Can't Reach You; Let My Song Teach You packs the emotional punches with some tunes, and Aubrey Plaza to showy effect in an episode that thrives on its ensemble."

CBR's Joshua M. Patton praised Plaza's reintroduction to the ensemble cast, stating her character "was arguably this week's most significant newcomer." Patton further highlighted Plaza and Hahn's portrayal of Rio and Agatha's romantic tension, writing: "Aubrey Plaza's and Kathryn Hahn's chemistry is so infectious that any excuse to see them interact onscreen becomes acceptable." He also commended the emotional resolution for Ahn's character at the end of the trial, noting that "it was nice to see her shine in Episode 4's most humanizing and dramatic spotlight." Alan French of Sunshine State Cineplex awarded "If I Can't Reach You / Let My Song Teach You" a score of 9/10, praising Aubrey Plaza as a standout performer for her ability to "dominate the screen" and citing her "outrageous" chemistry with Kathryn Hahn as a high point along Alice's "shockingly beautiful story." Valerie Anne of Autostraddle spotlighted Agatha and Rio's dynamic and the episode's diverse representation, stating: "With the characters all being women plus one gay teen, the vibes are excellent. Queerness has been a thread in the tapestry of this show from the start, not only because of the inherent queerness of witches, but because of the presence of queer actors and queer subtext. That said, I'm beyond thrilled it's becoming maintext."

Writing for Collider, Taylor Gates commented positively on the production design, calling the trial house a "pinnacle of architecture", and lauded the musical number, but felt the trial was underwhelming, writing: "Despite the stellar costumes and incredible music, this trial itself fell a little flat". Gates went on to opine that "If I Can't Reach You / Let My Song Teach You" cemented Agatha's dynamics with Rio and Teen as "the most intriguing parts" of the show, and concluded that character-driven scenes such as the one featuring the coven swapping stories around the fire felt "like that's what this show is all about." Caroline Framke of Vulture praised the episode's queer undertones, noting, "Queer narratives have always been baked into those of witches, who are traditionally depicted as women cast out for being different than what society deems acceptable." She added that Hahn and Plaza's "incredible, crackling chemistry [...] would be a genuine crime to waste [...] on platonic". Despite finding the episode to be "a lot of fun" Framke was more critical of the show's underdevelopment of its side characters, remarking, "The previous trial leaned on Jen's expertise to ostensibly highlight her and her history, just as this one does for Alice. We learn a little more about each of them, from Alice's curse to Jen's harrowing history with a white Boston doctor. [...] But even as Agatha is reluctantly learning to trust her coven instead of immediately cutting them loose, both Alice and Jen's episodes ultimately belong to the series' title character."

Rating the episode 7/10, Joshua Yehl of IGN was impressed with the ensemble cast, but offered a more reserved opinion on the episode's plot, stating, "The episode is filled to the brim with colorful characters who carry the show with their big personalities, magical mysteries, and juicy drama, and so Agatha All Along proves it can still be a devilishly fun watch even when it's not firing on all cylinders." According to Yehl, Alice's underdevelopment hindered the audience's ability to "feel invested in her big reveals and personal breakthroughs." Yehl praised the musical number, calling "the wonderfully campy performance of the new '70s version of the ballad" a "great" song that introduced "new story elements for Alice and her mother," but expressed a level of disappointment at it being "just a new take on a tune we've already heard."

=== Accolades ===
Accolades received by Agatha All Along
Award	Date of ceremony	Category	Recipient	Result	Ref.
Costume Designers Guild Awards	February 6, 2025	Excellence in Sci-Fi/Fantasy Television	Daniel Selon	Nominated	
