= Darkest Hour / Wake Thy Power =

- Agatha All Along episode
- Promotional poster for Agatha All Along, highlighting elements seen in this episode
- Episode no.: Episode 5
- Directed by: Rachel Goldberg
- Written by: Laura Monti
- Cinematography by: Caleb Heymann
- Editing by: Jamie Gross; Dane R. Naimy
- Original release date: October 9, 2024
- Running time: 32 minutes

Cast
- Kate Forbes as Evanora Harkness; Okwui Okpokwasili as Vertigo

Episode chronology
← Previous "If I Can't Reach You / Let My Song Teach You"	Next → "Familiar by Thy Side"

"Darkest Hour / Wake Thy Power" is the fifth episode of the American television miniseries Agatha All Along, based on Marvel Comics featuring the character Agatha Harkness. It follows Harkness, who has been stripped of her identity after the events of the miniseries WandaVision (2021), and her coven as they continue their journey down the Witches' Road. The episode is set in the Marvel Cinematic Universe (MCU), sharing continuity with the films of the franchise. It was written by Laura Monti and directed by Rachel Goldberg.

The episode centers on the third trial of the Witches' Road, which confronts Harkness (Kathryn Hahn) with the ghost of her mother, tests the coven's loyalties and sets the stage for Teen's (Joe Locke) identity to be revealed. Apart from Hahn and Locke, Sasheer Zamata, Ali Ahn, Patti LuPone and Aubrey Plaza also star in the episode. Filming took place in the Atlanta metropolitan area and in Los Angeles.

"Darkest Hour / Wake Thy Power" was released on the streaming service Disney+ on October 9, 2024, to positive reviews from critics, with praise for Hahn's performance and Billy Maximoff's reveal, but criticism for its short runtime. In 2025, the episode was nominated for a Primetime Emmy Award for Outstanding Sound Editing for a Comedy or Drama Series.

== Plot ==
While resting on the Witches' Road, Lilia Calderu awakens, startled by a vision of the Salem Seven closing in on the coven. She explains that the Seven, children of Agatha Harkness' original coven whom she spared after killing their parents, (Note: As depicted in the WandaVision episode "Previously On" (2021).) entered the Road through the gateway created during Rio Vidal's summoning. The coven attempt to flee on makeshift flying broomsticks, but the Road drags them back to the ground. Narrowly escaping the Seven, they enter a forest cabin styled after the 1980s.

Vidal identifies the next trial as Harkness' and Teen discovers a Ouija board, reading its rules aloud before the coven uses it to contact the dead. Harkness initially deceives the group by pretending to be possessed by Sharon Davis but is then genuinely overtaken by a spirit. Her possessed form attacks Teen and Jennifer Kale until Calderu turns on the lights, briefly expelling the ghost. The spirit is revealed to be Evanora Harkness, Agatha's mother, whom she murdered along with her original coven. Evanora demands the coven abandon Agatha to complete the trial, which Vidal and Teen oppose. As Kale and Calderu prepare to leave, Evanora possesses Agatha again. Alice Wu-Gulliver intervenes, striking Agatha with her magic and successfully expelling Evanora from her body, but Agatha seizes the opportunity to absorb Wu-Gulliver's power, killing her. Teen uses the Ouija board to spell Nicholas Scratch's name, whose disembodied voice shatters Harkness' trance, and an exit appears.

Back on the Road, Teen angrily confronts Harkness about Wu-Gulliver's murder, which she insists was an accident. As Teen condemns the coven members' pursuit of power on the Road, Harkness gleefully mocks him and tells him he takes after his mother. In a surge of emotion, Teen seizes control of Calderu and Kale's minds to make them hurl Harkness into a mud pool before blasting them in as well, where they begin to sink. A crown resembling the Scarlet Witch's headpiece forms on his head.

== Production ==
=== Development ===
In May 2021, Jac Schaeffer, the head writer of WandaVision, signed a three-year overall television deal with Marvel Studios and 20th Television to create new projects for their Disney+ lineup. In pitches for several different projects focused on various characters, Schaeffer consistently suggested including WandaVision character Agatha Harkness, a powerful witch from Marvel Comics, as part of those series. This led to her and Marvel Studios president Kevin Feige pursuing a series centered on that character instead. By October 2021, a "dark comedy" spin-off from WandaVision centered on Kathryn Hahn as Agatha was in early development for Disney+ from Marvel Studios, with Schaeffer returning as head writer and executive producer.

During a Disney+ Day event in November 2021, the series was officially announced, with Schaeffer revealed to be directing episodes of the series a year later. By October 2023, Marvel Studios was changing its approach to television, hiring more traditional showrunners instead of head writers. Schaeffer was being credited as the series' showrunner by July 2024. Marvel Studios' Feige, Louis D'Esposito, Winderbaum and Mary Livanos served as executive producers. Released under Marvel Studios' Marvel Television label, Agatha All Along was later announced to be second in a trilogy of series that includes WandaVision and VisionQuest (2026).

=== Writing ===
The episode's setting was inspired by 1980s slasher films such as The Exorcist (1973), Poltergeist (1982), Sleepaway Camp (1983) and Friday the 13th (1980). Agatha Harkness's trial was written as a slumber party to reflect her "worst nightmares" of community. The 1980s period was chosen as it felt "intrinsically linked" to the slumber party concept. The script for "Darkest Hour / Wake Thy Power" was condensed compared to others to accommodate the episode's action sequences. The episode used Lilia Calderu's reaction to the cultural stereotype of broomsticks in witchcraft as a way to offer a lighthearted critique that both ridicules and affirms the trope.

=== Casting ===
The episode stars Kathryn Hahn as Agatha Harkness, Joe Locke as Teen, Sasheer Zamata as Jennifer Kale, Ali Ahn as Alice Wu-Gulliver, Patti LuPone as Lilia Calderu and Aubrey Plaza as Rio Vidal. Kate Forbes reprises her role from WandaVision as Harkness' mother Evanora Harkness. The members of the Salem Seven include Okwui Okpokwasili as Vertigo, Marina Mazepa as "Snake", Bethany Curry as "Crow", Athena Perample as "Fox", Britta Grant as "Rat", Alicia Vela-Bailey as "Owl", and Chau Naumova as "Coyote".

=== Design ===
Costume designer Daniel Selon crafted the Salem Seven's attire to evoke the 1690s Salem, Massachusetts period silhouette while ensuring the fabric remained stretchable to accommodate the complex movements and contortions required of the performers. Each outfit subtly incorporated the animal associated with the character, with elements like feathers and bones for "Crow"'s headpiece, and scale-like details on "Snake"'s gown. The trial cabin set was designed to capture the essence of the 1980s, with set dressers including period-specific items such as VHS players, cassette tapes, and vinyl records amidst the clutter. To maintain consistency with the air theme of the trial, the set designers envisioned the cabin as a treehouse high up in the air.

=== Filming ===
Real animals were used on set for the animal forms of the Salem Seven, including a fox, a snake, a rat, an owl, a coyote and a crow. The Salem Seven were portrayed by trained dancers who emulated the animal movements to enhance their performances. The broomstick riding sequence was one of the few scenes filmed on a blue screen, utilizing physical broom props, spinning rigs, wind machines, and extensive stunt and wire work. Schaeffer explained that some material was cut from the episode in post-production due to the propulsive nature of the episode as the team was "looking at the fullness of the story" across all episodes when editing.

=== Music ===
In September 2024, Michael Paraskevas was revealed to have composed the series' score with Christophe Beck. It was released digitally by Marvel Music and Hollywood Records in two volumes: music from the first five episodes was released on October 11, 2024, and the music from the last four episodes was released on November 1, 2024. A soundtrack album was released on vinyl featuring all versions of "The Ballad of the Witches' Road", as well as selected tracks from the score, on October 30, 2024. The episode's end credits feature the song "You Should See Me in a Crown" by Billie Eilish.

== Reception ==
=== Viewership ===
Nielsen Media Research, which records streaming viewership on U.S. television screens, estimated that the series was viewed for 310 million minutes over the week of the episode's release. JustWatch, a guide to streaming content with access to data from more than 40 million users around the world, reported Agatha All Along as the 8th most-streamed series in the U.S. for the week ending October 13, 2024.

=== Critical response ===
The review aggregator website Rotten Tomatoes reported a 92% approval rating based on twelve reviews. The site's critical consensus reads, "Darkest Hour; Wake Thy Power revels in its final moment's big reveal, and daringly tees up a few dark trappings for the longer road ahead."

Caroline Siede of Episodic Medium praised the episode for efficiently utilizing its short runtime and progressing the plot. Siede opined that "these might be the most thrilling, emotionally complex 24 minutes of Agatha All Along to date", and wrote: ""Darkest Hour, Wake Thy Power" proves it's not about the length of the runtime—it's what you do with it that matters." Sunshine State Cineplex critic Alan French awarded the episode a score of 8/10 and praised the reveal of Billy Maximoff, stating, "They're willing to drop the big moments when it's most advantageous, and revealing this halfway through Agatha All Along also brings viewers back. It's an all-around win for Marvel, and the limited series turns in another killer episode". Jen Lennon from The A.V. Club gave the episode an A− grade, commenting positively on its commitment to breaking the narrative formulas of previous Marvel projects, Hahn's "impeccable line reading" and "S-tier" impression of Debra Jo Rupp, and the episode's ability "to craft a perfect reveal that actually felt earned." In an 8/10 review, Taylor Gates of Collider felt the episode "cranks things up a notch" and described "putting Agatha's trial in the middle of the season" as "a bold move" that "ultimately paid off" for offering a glimpse into Agatha's past, which "didn't shy away from how screwed up the Evanora of it all is and always has been". She praised Hahn and Locke's performances, writing: "Hahn continues to one-up herself every week with the range of emotions this part demands her to play — not to mention the speed this show asks her to toggle between them. [...] And getting to see another side of Locke in this episode's final moments positively thrills me."

Joshua M. Patton from CBR rated the episode 7/10 and celebrated the broom-flying sequence, stating, "The cast's performances and the filmmakers' skills do a stellar job of getting audiences in on the witches' fun." He lauded the cast, writing, "Everyone gives a good performance, though special mention must go to Kathryn Hahn and Ali Ahn. [...] This episode, in particular, gives Hahn the opportunity to portray Agatha at her most complex, layered and tragic." Patton criticised the second half of the episode for being "overloaded with [...] lore & set-up", remarking that the "tragic episode is constantly distracted by MCU teasers" and felt the decision to end on a cliffhanger "makes sense, but it also makes it feel abrupt and slightly incomplete." Jean Henegan of Pop Culture Maniacs called the episode "a mixed bag" and "more of a stepping stone to get us to the next portion of the story" as it "didn't have the same oomph as the first two trials", but expressed her investment in the narrative, concluding: "Even with my slight disappointment in the writing of this week's installment – I always want to know more about these characters, not simply sit with information we already know – Agatha All Along remains the best MCU offering in a long time."

In a 6/10 review, Joshua Yehl from IGN wrote: "While the big reveal in the fifth episode of Agatha All Along is a legitimately cool moment, everything that leads up to it is a bit unwieldy." Yehl was critical of the pacing, stating: "With each passing episode, the plot not only moves faster but it also gets thinner and thinner." He praised the episode for introducing "a proper villain" in the Salem Seven, and called Agatha's trial "a fair bit of fun" as "the whole setup results in some classic schlocky horror gags and a bunch of hearty laughs as the characters freak out and scramble to fix the situation." Tell-Tale TV's Mufsin Mahbub gave the episode a score of 3/5, and opined: "Despite the rushed pacing, the episode answers one of the show's most significant questions. If more time could be given to this particular hour, the story would have valuable breathing room for these developments to flourish."

=== Accolades ===
Kathryn Hahn's performance in "Darkest Hour / Wake Thy Power" earned her an honorable mention for TVLine's Performer of the Week for the week ending October 12, 2024, with Rebecca Iannucci stating, "Kathryn Hahn has one of the most formidable acting ranges in the business." Iannucci further commended Hahn for "her comedy chops [...] and her subtle dramatic skill", and concluded that Agatha Harkness' best moments occur "when Hahn leans way in to her character's delightfully diabolical flair." Billy Maximoff's reveal also placed 5th on the publication's "Top 30 Plot Twists" list.

Accolades received by Agatha All Along
Award	Date of ceremony	Category	Recipient	Result	Ref.
Primetime Creative Arts Emmy Awards	September 14, 2025	Outstanding Sound Editing for a Comedy or Drama Series	Kim Foscato, Paula Fairfield, Richard Gould, Daniel Laurie, Jacob Riehle, Andre J.H. Zweers, Kim B. Christensen, Fernand Bos, Mary Parker, Jana Vance, Ronni Brown	Nominated	
