= David Acord =

American sound editor and voice actor

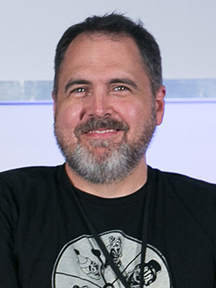
- Acord at Animate Florida in 2016
- Born: September 8, 1971 (age 54)
- Occupations: Sound editor, voice actor
- Years active: 1994–present
- Notable work: Star Wars: The Force Awakens, Star Wars: The Rise of Skywalker

David Acord is an American sound editor and voice actor best known for his contribution as a supervising sound editor of the 2015 film Star Wars: The Force Awakens. Acord received a nomination for the Academy Award for Best Sound Editing and British Academy Film Award for Best Sound for his work on The Force Awakens, with fellow sound editor Matthew Wood. He also provided the voice of several characters in the film, including the stormtrooper FN-2199 (often known as TR-8R). Though the voice role is minimal, the character gained considerable attention on the Internet following the film's release. Acord also had minor voice roles as an Imperial Male PA and two stormtroopers on episodes of Star Wars Rebels. Acord also voiced Grogu for the Disney Plus series The Mandalorian. In 2015, Acord was one of the sound designers for Disney Infinity video game. In 2020, he received his second Academy Award nomination for Best Sound Editing for the 2019 film Star Wars: The Rise of Skywalker, shared with Matthew Wood.

== Life and career ==
David Acord grew up in Delaware. He is a fan of the Philadelphia Eagles, going as far as to put references to the Eagles inside of Rogue One.

== Filmography ==
=== Sound editing ===
- The Mandalorian (2019–2021)
- Star Wars: The Force Awakens (2015)... (supervising sound editor)
- Star Wars Rebels (2014–2015) ... (TV Series) (sound designer) / (supervising sound editor)
- Avengers: Age of Ultron (2015) ... (sound designer)
- Day One (2015) (Short) ... (re-recording mixer)
- Inherent Vice (2014) ... (re-recording mixer)
- Guardians of the Galaxy (2014) ... (sound designer)
- Captain America: The Winter Soldier (2014) ... (sound effects editor)
- Chef (2014) ... (sound effects editor – uncredited)
- Star Wars: The Clone Wars (2008–2014) (TV Series) ... (sound designer)
- Thor: The Dark World (2014) ... (additional sound designer)
- Star Trek Into Darkness (2013) ... (sound effects editor)
- America 101 (2013) (Short) ... (sound re-recording mixer)
- Monster Roll (2012) (Short) ... (sound designer) / (sound re-recording mixer)
- Lego Star Wars: The Empire Strikes Out (2012) (TV Movie) ... (sound designer)
- The Master (2012) ... (sound effects editor)
- Zambezia (2012) ... (re-recording mixer) / (sound designer)
- Red Tails (2012) ... (re-recording mixer) / (sound designer)
- Super 8 (2011) ... (sound effects editor)
- Star Tours: The Adventures Continue (2011) (Short) ... (sound effects editor)
- Crazy Beats Strong Every Time (2011) (Short) ... (sound designer)
- Gun Hill Road ... (2011) (re-recording mixer)
- Clone Wars Adventures (2010) (Video Game) ... (sound designer)
- Fanboys (2009) ... (sound designer)
- Robot Chicken: Star Wars Episode II (2008) (TV Short) ... (sound designer)
- Star Wars: The Clone Wars (2008) ... (sound designer / sound effects editor)
- Lifted (2006) (Short) ... (sound designer)
- Zoom (2006) ... (assistant sound designer)
- Clerks II (2006) ... (sound effects editor)
- Cars (2006) ... (assistant supervising sound editor)
- Ice Age: The Meltdown (2006) ... (assistant sound effects editor)
- Feast (2005) ... (sound designer)
- Moongirl (2005) (Short) ... (sound effects editor)
- Star Wars: Episode III – Revenge of the Sith (2005) ... (assistant sound effects editor)
- Tweek City (2005) ... (boom operator)
- Psychonauts (2005) (Video Game) ... (sound effects editor – uncredited)
- The Incredibles (2004) ... (assistant supervising sound editor)
- The Dust Factory (2004) ... (assistant sound effects editor)
- Jersey Girl (2004) ... (sound effects editor)
- Adventures in Animation 3D (2004) (Short) ... (assistant sound designer)
- Bayside Shakedown 2 (2003) ... (assistant sound editor)
- Girls Club (2002) (TV Series) ... (utility sound)
- Men in Black II (2002)... (communications mixer – uncredited)
- Star Wars: Episode II – Attack of the Clones (2002) ... (apprentice sound effects editor)
- Big Trouble (2002) ... (utility sound – uncredited)
- Daddy and Them (2001) ... (utility sound)
- Unbreakable (2000) ... (utility cable)
- The Patriot (2000) ... (utility sound)
- North Beach (2000) ... (sound mixer)
- Sleepy Hollow (1999) ... (utility sound – uncredited)
- The '60s (1999) (TV Movie) ... (utility sound)
- Virus (1999) ... (cable person)
- Belly (1998) ... (boom operator)
- Legacy (1998) (TV Series) ... (utility sound)
- Fear and Loathing in Las Vegas (1998) ... (utility sound technician)
- Brave New World (1998) (TV Movie) ... (utility sound)
- Hush (1998) ... (cable person)
- Fallen (1998) ... (boom operator)
- The Night Flier (1997) ... (utility sound)
- Prince Street (1997) (TV Series) ... (utility sound)
- Nash Bridges (1996) (TV Series) ... (utility sound)

== Awards and recognitions ==
Year	Award	Category	Type	Title
2021	Daytime Emmy Award	Outstanding Sound Mixing and Sound Editing for an Animated Program	Won	Star Wars: The Clone Wars season 7
2020	Primetime Emmy Award	Outstanding Sound Editing for a Comedy or Drama Series (Half-Hour) and Animation	Won	The Mandalorian: "Chapter 1: The Mandalorian"
2020	Academy Award	Best Sound Editing	Nominated	Star Wars: The Rise of Skywalker
2018	Primetime Emmy Award	Outstanding Sound Editing for a Comedy or Drama Series (Half-Hour) and Animation	Nominated	Star Wars Rebels: "A World Between Worlds"
2018	Daytime Emmy Award	Outstanding Sound Editing – Animation	Nominated	Lego Star Wars: The Freemaker Adventures
2017	Daytime Emmy Award	Outstanding Sound Editing – Animation	Nominated	Lego Star Wars: The Freemaker Adventures
2016	Academy Award	Best Sound Editing	Nominated	Star Wars: The Force Awakens
2016	British Academy Film Awards	Best Sound	Nominated	Star Wars: The Force Awakens
2016	Seattle Film Critics Awards	Best Sound Design	Nominated	Star Wars: The Force Awakens
2015	Golden Reel Award	Best Sound Editing	Won	Star Wars Rebels
2015	Golden Reel Award	Best Sound Editing	Nominated	Star Wars: The Clone Wars
2015	Daytime Emmy Award	Outstanding Sound Editing – Animation	Nominated	Star Wars: The Clone Wars
2015	Daytime Emmy Award	Outstanding Sound Mixing – Animation	Nominated	Star Wars: The Clone Wars
2014	Daytime Emmy Award	Outstanding Sound Editing – Animation	Nominated	Star Wars: The Clone Wars
2014	Daytime Emmy Award	Outstanding Sound Mixing – Animation	Nominated	Star Wars: The Clone Wars
2014	Golden Reel Award	Best Sound Editing	Nominated	Star Wars: The Clone Wars
2013	Daytime Emmy Award	Outstanding Sound Mixing – Animation	Nominated	Star Wars: The Clone Wars
2013	Golden Reel Award	Best Sound Editing	Nominated	Lego Star Wars: The Empire Strikes Out
2012	Golden Reel Award	Best Sound Editing	Nominated	Super 8
2010	Golden Reel Award	Best Sound Editing	Nominated	Star Wars: The Clone Wars
2009	Golden Reel Award	Best Sound Editing	Won	Star Wars: The Clone Wars
