= Shaun Brennan =

American sound editor

- Occupation: Sound editor
- Years active: 2004–present

Shaun Brennan is an American sound editor. He won four Primetime Emmy Awards and was nominated for another one in the category Outstanding Sound Editing for his work on the television programs The Bear and Widow's Bay, and also the Hulu horror film Prey.
