= Hollywood Records discography =

This is a list of albums released by Disney-owned Hollywood Records, including studio albums, soundtrack albums, compilation albums, remix albums, and extended plays released by the label.

== 1990s ==
Released date	Artist	Album	Peak chart positions			US Certifications	CAN Certifications
Released date	Artist	Album	US	CAN	UK	US Certifications	CAN Certifications
July 18, 1990	Trevor Jones	Arachnophobia	—	—	—	—	—
August 31, 1990	The Party	The Party	116	—	—	—	—
February 4, 1991	Queen	Innuendo	30	16	1	Gold	Gold
May 26, 1991	James Horner	The Rocketeer: Music from the Original Motion Picture Soundtrack	—	—	—	—	—
September 17, 1991	The Party	In the Meantime, In Between Time (EP)	77	—	—	—	—
December 10, 1991	Hi-C	Skanless	152	—	—	—	—
March 3, 1992	Queen	Classic Queen	4	—	—	3× Platinum	5× Platinum
March 20, 1992	Dolly Parton	Straight Talk: Music From The Original Motion Picture Soundtrack	138	—	—	—	—
April 14, 1992	The Dead Milkmen	Soul Rotation	—	—	—	—	—
June 9, 1992	Marc Shaiman	Sister Act: Music From The Original Motion Picture	40	—	—	Gold	—
August 25, 1992	The Party	Free	163	—	—	—	—
February 2, 1993	Brian May	Back to the Light	159	—	—	—	—
March 5, 1993	Various Artists	Swing Kids (Original Soundtrack)	—	—	—	—	—
September 28, 1993	Rachel Portman	The Joy Luck Club (Original Soundtrack)	—	—	—	—	—
October 12, 1993	The Dead Milkmen	Not Richard, But Dick	—	—	—	—	—
November 12, 1993	Michael Kamen	The Three Musketeers: Original Motion Picture Soundtrack	—	—	—	—	—
November 23, 1993	The Party	The Party's Over...Thanks for Coming	—	—	—	—	—
November 23, 1993	Various Artists	Sister Act 2: Back in the Habit (Songs From The Motion Picture Soundtrack)	74	—	—	Gold	—
March 22, 1994	The Brian Setzer Orchestra	The Brian Setzer Orchestra	158	—	—	—	—
May 16, 1995	Hans Zimmer	Crimson Tide (Music from the Original Motion Picture)	—	—	—	—	—
September 12, 1995	Into Another	Seemless	—	—	—	—	—
November 6, 1995	Queen	Made in Heaven	58	18	1	Gold	Platinum
December 5, 1995	John Williams	Nixon: Original Motion Picture Soundtrack	—	—	—	—	—
February 23, 1996	Howard Shore	Before and After (film soundtrack)	—	—	—	—	—
April 6, 1996	Fastball	Make Your Mama Proud	—	—	—	—	—
May 7, 1996	Super 8	Super 8	—	—	—	—	—
May 21, 1996	The Suicide Machines	Destruction by Definition	—	—	—	—	—
June 7, 1996	Nick Glennie-Smith and Hans Zimmer	The Rock: Original Motion Picture Score	—	—	—	—	—
October 15, 1996	Various Artists	Swingers Original Soundtrack	—	—	—	—	—
October 29, 1996	Danzig	Blackacidevil	—	—	—	—	—
November 8, 1996	James Horner	Ransom (Original Soundtrack)	—	—	—	—	—
March 18, 1997	Leftover Salmon	Euphoria	—	—	—	—	—
March 25, 1997	Various Artists	The 6th Man: Official Soundtrack	—	—	—	—	—
April 22, 1997	Caroline's Spine	Monsoon	—	—	—	—	—
May 5, 1997	The Minus 5	The Lonesome Death of Buck McCoy	—	—	—	—	—
June 17, 1997	Trevor Rabin and Mark Mancina	Con Air: Music from the Motion Picture	—	—	—	—	—
June 24, 1997	Insane Clown Posse	The Great Milenko	63	—	—	—	—
July 1, 1997	John Powell	Face/Off: Original Soundtrack	—	—	—	—	—
August 19, 1997	The Party	Greatest Hits	—	—	—	—	—
September 30, 1997	Human Waste Project	E-lux	—	—	—	—	—
November 3, 1997	Queen	Queen Rocks	—	—	7	—	—
March 10, 1998	Fastball	All the Pain Money Can Buy	29	—	—	Platinum	—
April 7, 1998	The Suicide Machines	Battle Hymns	—	—	—	—	—
July 28, 1998	Various Artists	The Parent Trap (Original Soundtrack)	—	—	—	—	—
September 1, 1998	Alan Silvestri	The Parent Trap (film score)	—	—	—	—	—
September 15, 1998	Brian May	Another World	—	—	—	—	—
September 15, 1998	Idina Menzel	Still I Can't Be Still	—	—	—	—	—
November 3, 1998	Various Artists	The Waterboy: Original Soundtrack	—	—	—	—	—
November 24, 1998	Various Artists	Simon Birch: Original Motion Picture Soundtrack	—	—	—	—	—
December 8, 1998	James Horner	Mighty Joe Young: Original Score	—	—	—	—	—
March 23, 1999	Loudmouth	Loudmouth	—	—	—	—	—
March 30, 1999	Various Artists	The PJs: Music from & Inspired by the Hit Television Series	86	—	—	—	—
April 6, 1999	Various Artists	10 Things I Hate About You Music From The Motion Picture	52	—	—	—	—
July 20, 1999	Los Lobos	This Time	—	—	—	—	—
August 17, 1999	Caroline's Spine	Attention Please	—	—	—	—	—
September 14, 1999	Leftover Salmon	The Nashville Sessions	—	—	—	—	—
November 16, 1999	Various Artists	hEARS PremEARS Vol. 1: Music From The Disney Channel Original Movies	—	—	—	—	—
December 14, 1999	Various Artists	Deuce Bigalow: Male Gigolo (soundtrack)	—	—	—	—	—

== 2000s ==
Released date	Artist	Album	Peak chart positions			Certifications		
Released date	Artist	Album	US	CAN	UK	US	CAN	UK
February 1, 2000	Nobody's Angel	Nobody's Angel	184	—	—	—	—	
February 4, 2000	Various Artists	Gun Shy (soundtrack)	—	—	—	—	—	
February 15, 2000	The Suicide Machines	The Suicide Machines	—	—	—	—	—	
March 14, 2000	Ennio Morricone	Mission to Mars: Original Score	—	—	—	—	—	
March 21, 2000	Fishbone	Fishbone and the Familyhood Nextperience Present: The Psychotic Friends Nuttwerx	—	—	—	—	—	
May 16, 2000	BBMak	Sooner or Later	38	—	16	Gold	—	
May 16, 2000	Apartment 26	Hallucinating	—	—	—	—	—	
May 28, 2000	Various Artists	High Fidelity: Music from the Motion Picture	—	—	—	—	—	
June 19, 2000	Duran Duran	Pop Trash	135	—	—	—	—	
June 27, 2000	John Williams	The Patriot	—	—	—	—	—	
September 12, 2000	Various Artists	Duets: Original Soundtrack	—	—	—	—	—	
September 19, 2000	Fastball	The Harsh Light of Day	97	—	—	—	—	
November 21, 2000	James Newton Howard	Unbreakable (Original Motion Picture Score)	—	—	—	—	—	
January 23, 2001	Diffuser	Injury Loves Melody	—	—	—	—	—	
May 22, 2001	Hans Zimmer	Pearl Harbor: Music From The Motion Picture	14	—	—	—	—	
June 6, 2001	Various Artists	Crazy/Beautiful: Original Soundtrack	—	—	—	—	—	
June 26, 2001	Myra	Myra	—	—	—	—	—	
July 2, 2001	Tricky	Blowback	138	—	34	—	—	
August 28, 2001	Butthole Surfers	Weird Revolution	130	—	—	—	—	
September 25, 2001	The Suicide Machines	Steal This Record	—	—	—	—	—	
October 16, 2001	Myra	Milagros	—	—	—	—	—	
December 18, 2001	Various Artists	The Royal Tenenbaums Original Soundtrack	—	—	—	—	—	
April 2, 2002	Lil’ J	All About J		—	—	—	—	
May 14, 2002	3rd Strike	Lost Angel	72	—	—	—	—	
June 4, 2002	Various Artists	Bad Company: Music from the Motion Picture	98	—	—	—	—	
July 2, 2002	Various Artists	The Royal Tenenbaums Original Soundtrack (re-release)	—	—	—	—	—	
July 30, 2002	James Newton Howard	Signs Original Score	—	—	—	—	—	
August 27, 2002	BBMak	Into Your Head	25	—	—	—	—	
August 27, 2002	Fastball	Painting the Corners: The Best of Fastball	—	—	—	—	—	
August 27, 2002	Breaking Benjamin	Saturate	136	—	—	Gold	—	
March 4, 2003	Various Artists	Bringing Down the House (soundtrack)	111	—	—	—	—	
April 8, 2003	Flashlight Brown	My Degeneration	—	—	—	—	—	
May 20, 2003	Forty Foot Echo	Forty Foot Echo	—	—	—	—	—	
June 3, 2003	Josh Kelley	For the Ride Home	159	—	—	—	—	
June 10, 2003	Various Artists	Rugrats Go Wild! (Original Motion Picture Soundtrack)	—	—	—	—	—	
July 15, 2003	Diffuser	Making the Grade	—	—	—	—	—	
July 22, 2003	Jesse McCartney	JMac [EP]	—	—	—	—	—	
July 22, 2003	Various Artists	Lara Croft: Tomb Raider – The Cradle of Life (Original Motion Picture Soundtrack)	—	—	—	—	—	
July 22, 2003	Various Artists	Freaky Friday (Original Motion Picture Soundtrack)	19	—	—	Gold	—	
August 26, 2003	Hilary Duff	Metamorphosis	1	2	69	3× Platinum	4× Platinum	
September 16, 2003	calvin Richardson	2:35 PM	65					
February 14, 2004	Ingram Hill	June's Picture Show	—	—	—	—	—	
April 6, 2004	Various Artists	Ella Enchanted: Original Soundtrack	—	—	—	—	—	
June 22, 2004	Morris Day	It's About Time	—	—	—	—	—	
June 29, 2004	Breaking Benjamin	We Are Not Alone	20	—	—	Platinum	—	
July 27, 2004	James Newton Howard	The Village	—	—	—	—	—	
September 7, 2004	Raven-Symoné	This Is My Time	51	—	173	Gold	—	
September 28, 2004	Hilary Duff	Hilary Duff	2	1	—	Platinum	3× Platinum	
September 28, 2004	Jesse McCartney	Beautiful Soul	15	—	53	Platinum	—	
November 16, 2004	Trevor Rabin	National Treasure (Original Score)	—	—	—	—	—	
December 14, 2004	Various Artists	The Life Aquatic with Steve Zissou (soundtrack)	—	—	—	—	—	
March 1, 2005	Big Kenny	Live a Little	—	—	—	—	—	
April 12, 2005	Stephen Fry and Joby Talbot	The Hitchhikers Guide of the Galaxy (soundtrack)	—	—	—	—	—	
August 10, 2005	Hilary Duff	Most Wanted	1	1	31	Platinum	2× Platinum	
August 16, 2005	Aly & AJ	Into The Rush	36	—	—	Gold	—	
August 23, 2005	Josh Kelley	Almost Honest	114	—	—	—	—	
September 20, 2005	James Horner	Flightplan Original Score	—	—	—	—	—	
November 22, 2005	Seu Jorge	The Life Aquatic Studio Sessions	—	—	—	—	—	
December 12, 2005	The Cheetah Girls	Cheetah-licious Christmas	74	—	—	—	—	
January 10, 2006	Various Artists	Glory Road Original Soundtrack	—	—	—	—	—	
February 21, 2006	Evans Blue	The Melody and the Energetic Nature of Volume	106	—	—	—	—	
March 2006	Flashlight Brown	Blue	—	—	—	—	—	
July 18, 2006	Gran Bel Fisher	Full Moon Cigarette	—	—	—	—	—	
August 1, 2006	Jeannie Ortega	No Place Like BKLYN	127	—	—	—	—	
August 8, 2006	Breaking Benjamin	Phobia	2	—	—	Platinum	—	Silver
August 15, 2006	Various Artists	Girl Next	—	—	—	—	—	
September 12, 2006	Various Artists	The Guardian Original Soundtrack	—	—	—	—	—	
September 12, 2006	Plain White T’s	Every Second Counts	10	—	3	Gold	—	
September 19, 2006	Jesse McCartney	Right Where You Want Me	14	—	153	Gold	—	
September 19, 2006	Indigo Girls	Despite Our Differences	44	—	—	—	—	
September 26, 2006	Vanessa Hudgens	V	24	—	86	Gold	—	
September 26, 2006	Aly & AJ	Acoustic Hearts of Winter	78	—	—	—	—	
October 17, 2006	David Julyan	The Prestige: Original Score	—	—	—	—	—	
October 31, 2006	Ingram Hill	Why the Wait	—	—	—	—	—	
November 21, 2006	Various Artists	Déjà Vu Original Soundtrack	—	—	—	—	—	
December 5, 2006	James Horner	Apocalypto: Original Score	—	—	—	—	—	
February 6, 2007	Jordan Pruitt	No Ordinary Girl	64	—	—	—	—	
April 3, 2007	Hilary Duff	Dignity	3	3	25	Gold	—	
April 17, 2007	Various Artists	The Invisible: Original Soundtrack	—	—	—	—	—	
May 1, 2007	Corbin Bleu	Another Side	36	—	120	—	—	
June 26, 2007	Miley Cyrus	Hannah Montana 2: Meet Miley Cyrus	1	3	8	3× Platinum	2× Platinum	Gold
July 10, 2007	Aly & AJ	Insomniatic	15	—	72	Gold	—	
July 10, 2007	Various Artists	Girl Next, Vol. 2	—	—	—	—	—	
July 28, 2007	Evans Blue	The Pursuit Begins When This Portrayal of Life Ends	44	—	—	—	—	
August 7, 2007	Grace Potter and the Nocturnals	This Is Somewhere	119	—	—	—	—	
August 7, 2007	Jonas Brothers	Jonas Brothers	5	10	9	2× Platinum	Gold	Gold
August 21, 2007	Ingram Hill	Cold in California	—	—	—	—	—	
September 25, 2007	The Cheetah Girls	TCG	44	—	—	—	—	
April 10, 2008	Marié Digby	Unfold	29	—	—	—	—	
April 29, 2008	Raven-Symoné	Raven-Symoné	159	—	—	—	—	
May 20, 2008	Jesse McCartney	Departure	14	—	97	—	—	
July 1, 2008	Vanessa Hudgens	Identified	23	—	46	—	—	
July 22, 2008	Jordan Pruitt	Permission to Fly	—	—	—	—	—	
July 22, 2008	Miley Cyrus	Breakout	1	1	10	Platinum	—	
August 12, 2008	Jonas Brothers	A Little Bit Longer	1	1	19	2× Platinum	2× Platinum	Gold
August 28, 2008	Atreyu	Lead Sails Paper Anchor	8	—	61	—	—	
September 15, 2008	Queen + Paul Rodgers	The Cosmos Rocks	47	—	—	—	—	
September 23, 2008	Demi Lovato	Don't Forget	2	9	192	Gold	—	
September 23, 2008	Terence Blanchard	Miracle at St. Anna: Original Soundtrack	—	—	—	—	—	
September 23, 2008	Plain White T's	Big Bad World	33	—	—	—	—	
November 4, 2008	Various Artists	All Wrapped Up	10	—	—	—	—	
November 11, 2008	Hilary Duff	Best of Hilary Duff	125	—	—	—	—	
February 17, 2009	Various Artists	Confessions of a Shopaholic (soundtrack)	—	—	—	—	—	
March 10, 2009	Corbin Bleu	Speed of Light	—	—	—	—	—	
March 10, 2009	Ballas Hough Band	BHB	98	—	—	—	—	
April 1, 2009	Various Artists	Adventureland - Original Motion Picture Soundtrack	—	—	—	—	—	
April 23, 2009	Miley Cyrus	iTunes Live from London	—	—	—	—	—	
June 16, 2009	Jonas Brothers	Lines, Vines and Trying Times	1	1	9	Gold	Platinum	
June 24, 2009	Marie Digby	Breathing Underwater	183	—	—	—	—	
July 21, 2009	Demi Lovato	Here We Go Again	1	5	199	Gold	—	
August 28, 2009	Miley Cyrus	The Time of Our Lives [EP]	2	9	17	Platinum	—	
September 15, 2009	Honor Society	Fashionably Late	18	—	—	—	—	
September 29, 2009	Selena Gomez & the Scene	Kiss & Tell	9	22	12	Gold	Platinum	Silver
September 29, 2009	Breaking Benjamin	Dear Agony	4	13	—	Platinum	—	
October 27, 2009	Atreyu	Congregation of the Damned	18	22	116	—	—	
October 30, 2009	Various Artists	All Wrapped Up Vol. 2	32	—	—	—	—	

== 2010s ==
Release Date	Artist	Album	Peak chart positions			Certifications		
Release Date	Artist	Album	US	CAN	UK	US	CAN	UK
February 2, 2010	Nick Jonas & the Administration	Who I Am	3	4	50	—	—	
March 23, 2010	Various Artists	The Last Song: Original Soundtrack	80	—	—	—	—	
April 25, 2010	Alpha Rev	New Morning	195	—	—	—	—	
June 8, 2010	Grace Potter and the Nocturnals	Grace Potter and the Nocturnals	19	—	—	—	—	
June 18, 2010	Miley Cyrus	Can't Be Tamed	3	2	8	—	—	
June 26, 2010	Allstar Weekend	Suddenly [EP]	62	—	—	—	—	
September 17, 2010	Selena Gomez & the Scene	A Year Without Rain	4	6	14	Gold	Gold	Silver
October 19, 2010	Allstar Weekend	Suddenly Yours	197	—	—	—	—	
December 7, 2010	Plain White T's	Wonders of the Younger	149	—	—	—	—	
April 26, 2011	Various Artists	Prom (Original Motion Picture Soundtrack)	—	—	—	—	—	
June 28, 2011	Selena Gomez & the Scene	When the Sun Goes Down	3	2	15	Gold	Platinum	Silver
August 16, 2011	Breaking Benjamin	Shallow Bay: The Best of Breaking Benjamin	22	—	—	—	—	
September 20, 2011	Demi Lovato	Unbroken	4	4	45	Gold	—	
September 27, 2011	Allstar Weekend	All the Way	49	71	—	—	—	
October 11, 2011	Joe Jonas	Fastlife	15	23	99	—	—	
May 1, 2012	Various Artists	Avengers Assemble: Music from and Inspired by the Motion Picture	11	14	—	—	—	
May 1, 2012	Alan Silvestri	The Avengers (Original Motion Picture Soundtrack)	—	—	—	—	—	
May 15, 2012	Cherri Bomb	This Is the End of Control	—	—	—	—	—	
June 12, 2012	Grace Potter and the Nocturnals	The Lion the Beast the Beat	17	—	—	—	—	
July 27, 2012	Queen	Hungarian Rhapsody: Queen Live in Budapest ’86	—	—	—	—	—	
October 12, 2012	ZZ Ward	Til the Casket Drops	72	—	—	—	—	
October 22, 2012	Bridgit Mendler	Hello My Name Is...	30	—	107	—	Gold	
February 19, 2013	R5	Loud [EP]	69	—	—	—	—	
March 12, 2013	Coco Jones	Made Of [EP]	—	—	—	—	—	
April 9, 2013	Plain White T's	Should've Gone to Bed [EP]	—	—	—	—	—	
April 30, 2013	Various Artists	Iron Man 3: Heroes Fall – Music Inspired by the Motion Picture	16	—	—	—	—	
April 30, 2013	Brian Tyler	Iron Man 3 (Original Motion Picture Soundtrack)	—	—	—	—	—	
May 14, 2013	Demi Lovato	Demi	3	1	10	2× Platinum	Gold	Gold
June 1, 2013	Queen	Icon	—	—	—	—	Platinum	
July 23, 2013	Selena Gomez	Stars Dance	1	1	14	—	Gold	
September 17, 2013	Zendaya	Zendaya	51	—	—	—	—	
September 24, 2013	R5	Louder	24	—	149	—	—	
November 12, 2013	Brian Tyler	Thor: The Dark World (Original Motion Picture Soundtrack)	—	—	—	—	—	
March 11, 2014	Joywave	How Do You Feel? (EP)	—	—	—	—	—	
April 1, 2014	Henry Jackman	Captain America: The Winter Soldier (Original Motion Picture Soundtrack)	—	—	—	—	—	
April 8, 2014	Sabrina Carpenter	Can't Blame A Girl For Trying [EP]	—	—	—	—	—	
April 22, 2014	Bea Miller	Young Blood (EP)	64	—	—	—	—	
May 29, 2014	R5	Live in London (EP)	—	—	—	—	—	
July 22, 2014	R5	Heart Made Up On You [EP]	36	—	—	—	—	
July 29, 2014	Various Artists	Guardians of the Galaxy: Awesome Mix Vol. 1	1	1	1	3× Platinum	Diamond	2× Platinum
July 29, 2014	Tyler Bates	Guardians of the Galaxy (Original Motion Picture Score)	—	—	—	—	—	
August 12, 2014	A.R. Rahman	The Hundred-Foot Journey (Original Motion Picture Soundtrack)	—	—	—	—	—	
November 11, 2014	Queen	Queen Forever	38	11	5	—	—	
November 17, 2014	Bella Thorne	Jersey (EP)	—	—	—	—	—	
November 24, 2014	Selena Gomez	For You	24	—	33	—	—	
January 19, 2015	Various Artists	Galavant: Original Soundtrack	–	—	—	—	—	
April 21, 2015	Sabrina Carpenter	Eyes Wide Open	43	—	—	—	—	
April 21, 2015	Joywave	How Do You Feel Now?	50	—	—	—	—	
April 27, 2015 (digital)	John Paesano	Daredevil (Original Soundtrack Album)	—	—	—	—	—	
April 28, 2015	Brian Tyler and Danny Elfman	Avengers: Age of Ultron (Original Motion Picture Soundtrack)	—	—	—	—	—	
June 2, 2015	Zella Day	Kicker	65	—	—	—	—	
June 23, 2015	Breaking Benjamin	Dark Before Dawn	1	1	34	Gold	—	
July 10, 2015	R5	Sometime Last Night	6	12	73	—	—	
July 17, 2015	Christophe Beck	Ant-Man (Original Motion Picture Soundtrack)	—	—	—	—	—	
July 24, 2015	Bea Miller	Not an Apology	7	—	—	—	—	
August 14, 2015	Grace Potter	Midnight	—	—	—	—	—	
October 16, 2015	Thomas Newman	Bridge of Spies (Original Motion Picture Soundtrack)	—	—	—	—	—	
October 16, 2015	Demi Lovato	Confident	2	1	6	Platinum	—	Platinum
January 29, 2016	Various Artists	Galavant: Season 2 (Original Soundtrack)	—	—	—	—	—	
March 11, 2016	Joywave	Swish	—	—	—	—	—	
March 18, 2016	Various Artists	Star Wars Headspace	180	—	—	—	—	
April 29, 2016	Martina Stoessel	TINI	—	—	—	—	—	
May 6, 2016	Henry Jackman	Captain America: Civil War (Original Motion Picture Soundtrack)	168	—	—	—	—	
July 1, 2016	Forever In Your Mind	FIYM (EP)	—	—	—	—	—	
July 15, 2016 (Digital)	John Paesano	Daredevil: Season 2 (Original Soundtrack Album)	—	—	—	—	—	
July 15, 2016	Olivia Holt	Olivia (EP)	—	—	—	—	—	
August 19, 2016	Jordan Fisher	Jordan Fisher (EP)	—	—	—	—	—	
October 7, 2016	Adrian Younge and Ali Shaheed Muhammad	Luke Cage (Original Soundtrack Album)	—	—	—	—	—	
October 14, 2016	Sabrina Carpenter	EVOLution	28	84	—	—	—	
October 21, 2016	Michael Giacchino	Doctor Strange (Original Motion Picture Soundtrack)	—	—	—	—	—	
November 4, 2016	Queen	On Air	—	—	25	—	—	
March 3, 2017	Ocean Park Standoff	Ocean Park Standoff (EP)	—	—	—	—	—	
March 17, 2017	Trevor Morris	Iron Fist (Original Soundtrack Album)	—	—	—	—	—	
April 21, 2017	Various Artists	Guardians of the Galaxy Vol. 2: Awesome Mix Vol. 2	4	6	—	Platinum	2× Platinum	Platinum
April 21, 2017	Tyler Bates	Guardians of the Galaxy Vol. 2 (Original Motion Picture Score)	—	—	—	—	—	
May 5, 2017	New Hope Club	Welcome to the Club (EP)	—	—	—	—	—	
May 12, 2017	R5	New Addictions (EP)	—	—	—	—	—	
June 16, 2017	Shawn Hook	My Side of Your Story (EP)	—	74	—	—	—	
June 30, 2017	ZZ Ward	The Storm	75	—	—	—	—	
July 28, 2017	Joywave	Content	—	—	—	—	—	
August 17, 2017	John Paesano	The Defenders (Original Soundtrack Album)	—	—	—	—	—	
September 29, 2017	Demi Lovato	Tell Me You Love Me	3	4	5	Platinum	Gold	Gold
October 20, 2017	Mark Mothersbaugh	Thor: Ragnarok (Original Motion Picture Soundtrack)	—	—	—	—	—	
November 17, 2017	Tyler Bates	The Punisher (Original Soundtrack Album)	—	—	—	—	—	
December 8, 2017	Various Artists	A Hollywood Christmas	—	—	—	—	—	
January 12, 2018	Forever in Your Mind	Euphoric (EP)	—	—	—	—	—	
February 16, 2018	Ludwig Göransson	Black Panther (Original Score)	64	—	—	—	—	
February 23, 2018	Bea Miller	Aurora	—	—	—	—	—	
March 16, 2018	Sean Callery	Jessica Jones: Season 2 (Original Soundtrack)	—	—	—	—	—	
April 13, 2018	Breaking Benjamin	Ember	3	4	35	—	—	
April 27, 2018	Alan Silvestri	Avengers: Infinity War (Original Motion Picture Soundtrack)	92	—	—	—	—	
June 22, 2018	Adrian Younge and Ali Shaheed Muhammad	Luke Cage: Season 2 (Original Soundtrack Album)	—	—	—	—	—	
July 6, 2018	Christophe Beck	Ant-Man and the Wasp (Original Motion Picture Soundtrack)	—	—	—	—	—	
July 6, 2018	Mark Isham	Cloak and Dagger: Season 1 (Original Score)	—	—	—	—	—	
August 17, 2018	Various Artists	Black Panther: Wakanda Remixed	—	—	—	—	—	
October 12, 2018	Martina Stoessel	Quiero Volver	—	—	—	—	—	
October 19, 2018	Queen	Bohemian Rhapsody: The Original Soundtrack	2	3	3	Gold	Gold	Platinum
October 30, 2018	New Hope Club	Welcome to the Club Pt. 2 (EP)	—	—	—	—	—	
November 9, 2018	Sabrina Carpenter	Singular: Act I	103	—	—	—	—	
February 16, 2019	Jorge Blanco	Conmigo (EP)	—	—	—	—	—	
March 8, 2019	Pinar Toprak	Captain Marvel (Original Motion Picture Soundtrack)	—	—	—	—	—	
April 19, 2019	JD McCrary	Shine (EP)	—	—	—	—	—	
April 26, 2019	Alan Silvestri	Avengers: Endgame (Original Motion Picture Soundtrack)	88	—	—	—	—	
May 3. 2019	Mark Isham	Cloak and Dagger: Season 2 (Original Score)	—	—	—	—	—	
May 17, 2019	Maddie Poppe	Whirlwind	—	—	—	—	—	
July 19, 2019	Sabrina Carpenter	Singular: Act II	138	—	—	—	—	
October 18, 2019	Michael Giacchino	Jojo Rabbit (Original Motion Picture Soundtrack)	—	—	—	—	—	
November 15, 2019	Marco Beltrami, Buck Sanders	Ford v Ferrari (Original Motion Picture Soundtrack)	—	—	—	—	—	
November 22, 2019	Alejandro Aranda (Scarypoolparty)	Exit Form	—	—	—	—	—	
December 27, 2019	Theodore Shapiro	Spies in Disguise (Original Score)						

== 2020s ==
Released date	Artist	Album	Peak chart positions			US Certifications	CAN Certifications
Released date	Artist	Album	US	CAN	UK	US Certifications	CAN Certifications
January 24, 2020	Breaking Benjamin	Aurora	29	56	—	—	—
February 14, 2020	New Hope Club	New Hope Club	—	—	5	—	—
February 14, 2020	Volker Bertelmann	Downhill (Original Motion Picture Soundtrack)	—	—	—	—	—
February 14, 2020	John Powell	The Call of The Wild (Original Motion Picture Soundtrack)	—	—	—	—	—
March 13, 2020	Joywave	Possession	—	—	—	—	—
August 28, 2020	Mark Snow	The New Mutants (Original Motion Picture Soundtrack)	—	—	—	—	—
October 2, 2020	Queen + Adam Lambert	Live Around the World	56	—	1	—	—
December 3, 2020	Tini	Tini Tini Tini	—	—	—	—	—
January 22—March 12, 2021	Christophe Beck	WandaVision (Original Soundtrack)	—	—	—	—	—
April 9, 2021	Henry Jackman	The Falcon and the Winter Soldier: Vol. 1 (Episodes 1–3) (Original Soundtrack)	—	—	—	—	—
April 30, 2021	Henry Jackman	The Falcon and the Winter Soldier: Vol. 2 (Episodes 4–6) (Original Soundtrack)	—	—	—	—	—
June 25, 2021	Joywave	Every Window Is A Mirror (EP)	—	—	—	—	—
July 29, 2022	Sofia Carson	Leave Your Heart on the Dance Floor (EP)	—	—	—	—	—
July 2—July 25, 2021	Natalie Holt	Loki (Original Soundtrack)					
July 9, 2021	Lorne Balfe	Black Widow (Original Motion Picture Soundtrack)	—	—	—	—	—
August 11, 2021	Christophe Beck	Free Guy (Original Motion Picture Soundtrack)	—	—	—	—	—
August 13, 2021	Laura Karpman	What If...? (Original Soundtrack)					
September 3, 2021	Various Artists	Shang-Chi and the Legend of the Ten Rings: The Album	160	47	—	—	—
September 3, 2021	Joel P. West	Shang-Chi and the Legend of the Ten Rings (Original Motion Picture Soundtrack)	—	—	—	—	—
September 17, 2021	Theodore Shapiro	The Eyes of Tammy Faye (Original Motion Picture Soundtrack)	—	—	—	—	—
October 15, 2021	Harry Gregson-Williams	The Last Duel (Original Motion Picture Soundtrack)	—	—	—	—	—
October 15, 2021	Henry Jackman	Ron's Gone Wrong (Original Motion Picture Soundtrack)	—	—	—	—	—
November 3, 2021	Ramin Djawadi	Eternals (Original Motion Picture Soundtrack)	—	—	—	—	—
December 3, 2021	Various Artists	West Side Story (Original Motion Picture Soundtrack)	38	—	—	—	—
December 9, 2021	The Simpsons	Songs in the Key of Springfield (digital)	—	—	—	—	—
February 11, 2022	Joywave	Cleanse	—	—	—	—	—
March 25, 2022	Sofia Carson	Sofia Carson	—	—	—	—	—
May 4, 2022	Danny Elfman	Doctor Strange in the Multiverse of Madness (Original Motion Picture Soundtrack)	—	—	—	—	—
July 2, 2022	Michael Giacchino, Nami Melumad	Thor: Love and Thunder (Original Motion Picture Soundtrack)	—	—	—	—	—
July 25, 2022	Various Artists	Wakanda Forever Prologue	—	—	—	—	—
July 29, 2022	Sofia Carson	Purple Hearts	136	68	4	—	—
October 7, 2022	Daniel Pemberton	Amsterdam (Original Motion Picture Soundtrack)	—	—	—	—	—
October 21, 2022	Carter Burwell	The Banshees of Inisherin (Original Motion Picture Soundtrack)	—	—	—	—	—
November 4, 2022	Various Artists	Black Panther: Wakanda Forever – Music from and Inspired by	12	7	23	—	—
November 11, 2022	Ludwig Göransson	Black Panther: Wakanda Forever (Original Score)	—	—	66	—	—
December 9, 2022	Anna Drubich	Barbarian (Original Motion Picture Soundtrack)	—	—	—	—	—
December 15, 2022	Simon Franglen	Avatar: The Way of Water (Original Motion Picture Soundtrack)	—	—	—	—	—
February 15, 2023	Christophe Beck	Ant-Man and the Wasp: Quantumania (Original Motion Picture Soundtrack)	—	—	—	—	—
May 3, 2023	Various Artists	Guardians of the Galaxy Vol. 3: Awesome Mix Vol. 3	15	—	—	—	—
May 3, 2023	John Murphy	Guardians of the Galaxy Vol. 3 (Original Score)	—	—	—	—	—
September 15, 2023	Hildur Guðnadóttir	A Haunting in Venice (Original Motion Picture Soundtrack)	—	—	—	—	—
September 29, 2023	Hans Zimmer	The Creator (Original Motion Picture Soundtrack)	—	—	—	—	—
November 8, 2023	Laura Karpman	The Marvels (Original Motion Picture Soundtrack)	—	—	—	—	—
April 5, 2024	Mark Korven	The First Omen (Original Motion Picture Soundtrack)	—	—	—	—	—
May 10, 2024	John Paesano	Kingdom of the Planet of the Apes (Original Motion Picture Soundtrack)	—	—	—	—	—
May 17, 2024	Joywave	Permanent Pleasure	—	—	—	—	—
July 5, 2024	New Hope Club	Getting Better	—	—	—	—	—
July 24, 2024	Various Artists	Deadpool & Wolverine (Original Motion Picture Soundtrack)	119	—	6	—	—
July 26, 2024	Kenzie	Biting My Tongue	—	—	—	—	—
August 16, 2024	Benjamin Wallfisch	Alien: Romulus (Original Motion Picture Soundtrack)	—	—	—	—	—
February 12, 2025	Laura Karpman	Captain America: Brave New World (Original Motion Picture Soundtrack)	—	—	—	—	—
April 30, 2025	Son Lux	Thunderbolts* (Original Motion Picture Soundtrack)	—	—	—	—	—
June 6, 2025	Benjamin Wallfisch	Predator: Killer of Killers (Original Motion Picture Soundtrack)	—	—	—	—	—
July 18, 2025	Michael Giacchino	The Fantastic Four: First Steps (Original Motion Picture Soundtrack)	—	—	—	—	—
August 1, 2025	Various Artists	Freakier Friday (Original Motion Picture Soundtrack)	—	—	—	—	—
November 7, 2025	Sarah Schachner, Benjamin Wallfisch	Predator: Badlands (Original Motion Picture Soundtrack)	—	—	—	—	—
December 5, 2025	Simon Franglen	Avatar: Fire and Ash (Original Motion Picture Soundtrack)	—	—	—	—	—
May 1, 2026	Theodore Shapiro	The Devil Wears Prada 2 (Original Score)	—	—	—	—	—
November 6, 2026	Carter Burwell	Wild Horse Nine (Original Motion Picture Soundtrack)	—	—	—	—	—
November 6, 2026	The Behemoth! Collective	Behemoth! (Original Motion Picture Soundtrack)	—	—	—	—	—

== See also ==
- Walt Disney Records discography
