= Music of the Marvel Cinematic Universe =

Media franchise soundtracks and scores

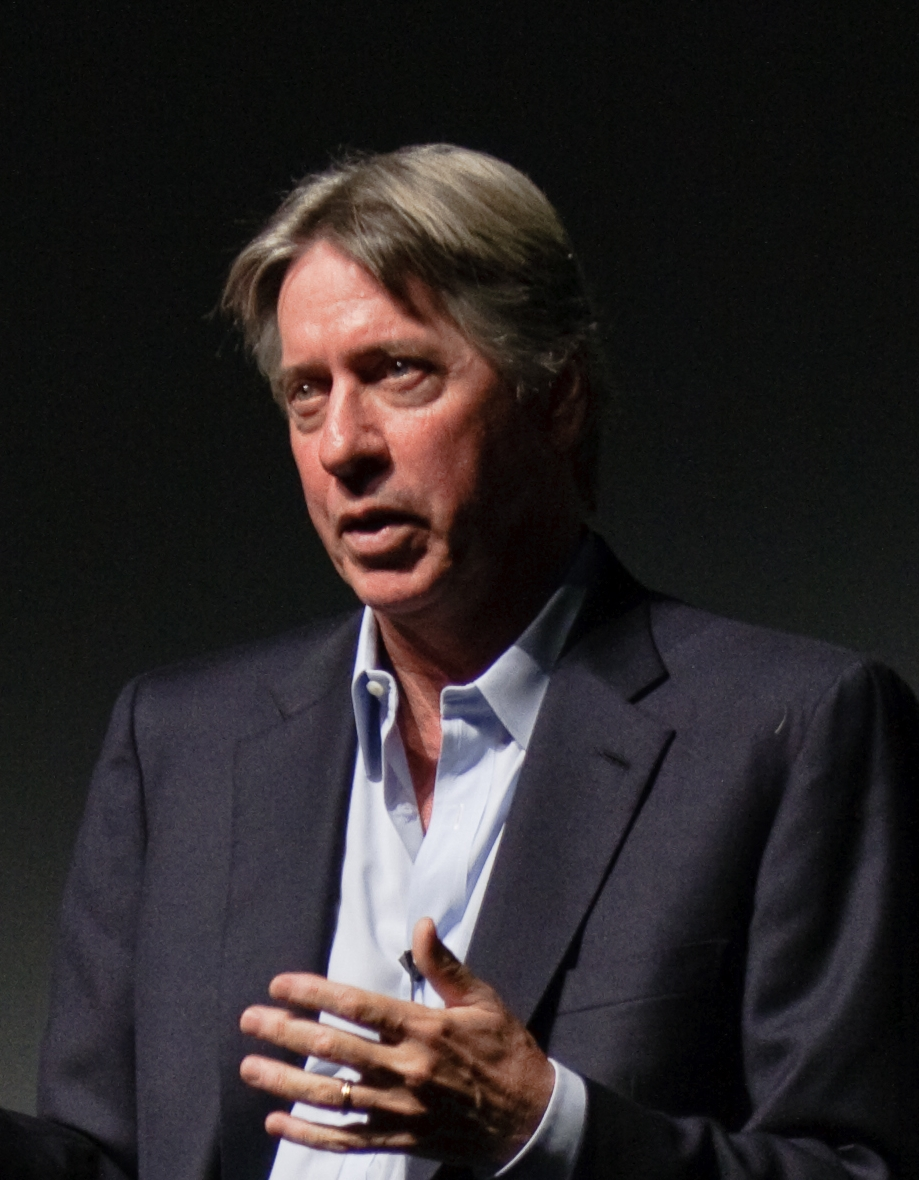
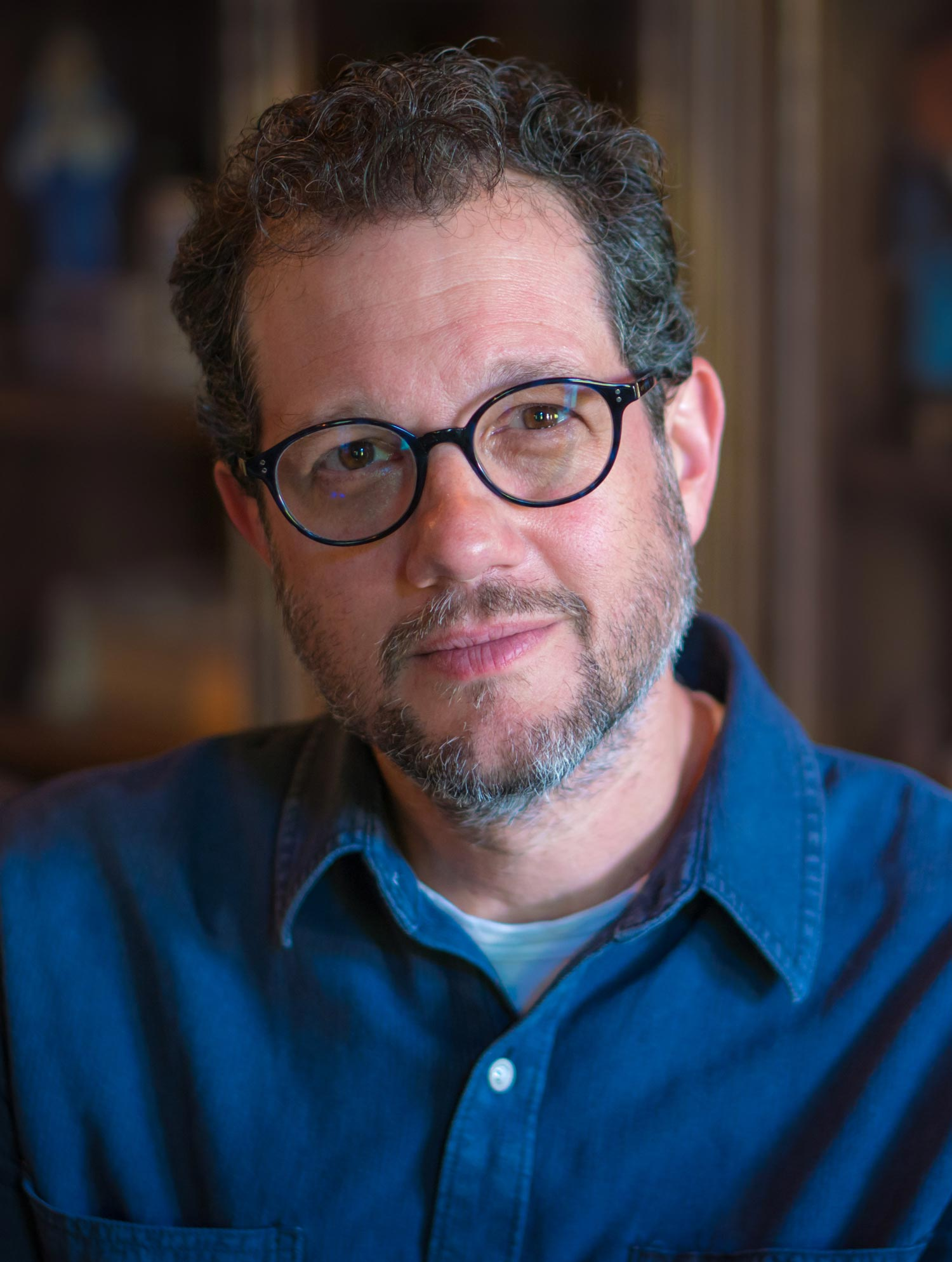
Many composers have worked on the franchise. Alan Silvestri (left) was the first composer to score multiple MCU films, while Michael Giacchino (right) has composed for the most MCU projects.

The music of the Marvel Cinematic Universe consists of original scores, original songs, and compilation soundtrack albums for the Marvel Cinematic Universe (MCU), an American media franchise and shared universe. It includes music created for feature films, television series, television specials, and short films produced by Marvel Studios, as well as television series produced by Marvel Television, all based on characters that appear in American comic books published by Marvel Comics.

Ramin Djawadi provided the first MCU music with his original score for the film Iron Man (2008). Alan Silvestri was the first composer to work on multiple MCU films and has gone on to work on six films, while Michael Giacchino has composed for the most MCU projects, scoring seven films and a television special. Brian Tyler composed the fanfare for Marvel Studios' opening logo, which debuted in 2013, with Giacchino composing the new studio fanfare that has been used since 2016. Several compilation albums have been created for MCU films using existing and original songs, including Black Panther: The Album (2018) which consists of original songs curated by Kendrick Lamar. Other notable original songs created for MCU projects include those written by Kristen Anderson-Lopez and Robert Lopez for the series WandaVision (2021) and Agatha All Along (2024).

The MCU's early music was criticized for lacking memorable themes and not having continuity between films, other than Silvestri's work on the first Captain America and Avengers films. Responses improved during the franchise's Phase Three (2016–2019), which saw Giacchino joining and Silvestri providing more continuity between projects.

== Feature films ==
=== Phase One films ===
Score albums for Phase One films
Title	U.S. release date	Length	Composer	Label(s)	Ref.
Iron Man: Original Motion Picture Soundtrack	May 6, 2008	54:14	Ramin Djawadi	Lionsgate Records	
The Incredible Hulk: Original Motion Picture Score	June 13, 2008	110:55	Craig Armstrong	Marvel Music	
Iron Man 2: Original Motion Picture Score	July 20, 2010	72:01	John Debney	Columbia Records	
Thor	May 3, 2011	71:53	Patrick Doyle	Buena Vista Records; Marvel Music	
Captain America: The First Avenger—Original Motion Picture Soundtrack	July 19, 2011	71:53	Alan Silvestri	Buena Vista Records; Marvel Music	
The Avengers (Original Motion Picture Soundtrack)	May 1, 2012	64:25	Alan Silvestri	Hollywood Records; Marvel Music	

The Avengers is a crossover film, bringing together the main characters from each film of Phase One. Marvel Studios felt the music would become "clunky" if they tried to use different themes for each character, and asked Silvestri to focus on a new fanfare for the Avengers rather than reprising themes from the other films of the phase, although he did reprise his own "Captain America March" from The First Avenger.

Compilation albums for Phase One films
Title	U.S. release date	Length	Label(s)	Ref.
AC/DC: Iron Man 2	April 19, 2010	60:15	Columbia Records	
Avengers Assemble (Music from and Inspired by the Motion Picture)	May 1, 2012	48:20	Hollywood Records; Marvel Music	

Avengers Assemble includes the original song "Live to Rise" by Soundgarden.

=== Phase Two films ===
Score albums for Phase Two films
Title	U.S. release date	Length	Composer(s)	Labels	Ref.
Iron Man 3 (Original Motion Picture Soundtrack)	April 30, 2013	75:53	Brian Tyler	Hollywood Records; Marvel Music	
Thor: The Dark World (Original Motion Picture Soundtrack)	November 12, 2013	77:11	Brian Tyler	Hollywood Records; Marvel Music	
Captain America: The Winter Soldier (Original Motion Picture Soundtrack)	April 1, 2014	74:32	Henry Jackman	Hollywood Records; Marvel Music	
Guardians of the Galaxy (Original Score)	July 29, 2014	64:34	Tyler Bates	Hollywood Records; Marvel Music	
Avengers: Age of Ultron (Original Motion Picture Soundtrack)	April 28, 2015	77:26	Brian Tyler and Danny Elfman	Hollywood Records; Marvel Music	
Ant-Man (Original Motion Picture Soundtrack)	July 17, 2015	65:20	Christophe Beck	Hollywood Records; Marvel Music	

Marvel Studios hired Tyler to compose new heroic themes for Iron Man and Thor, abandoning the themes from the Phase One films. For Age of Ultron, Tyler reprised his Iron Man and Thor themes along with Silvestri's "Captain America March", and composed a new heroic theme for the Avengers. Elfman later joined the project and combined Tyler's new theme with Silvestri's Avengers fanfare to create a "hybrid" theme.

Compilation albums for Phase Two films
Title	U.S. release date	Length	Labels	Ref.
Iron Man 3: Heroes Fall (Music Inspired by the Motion Picture)	April 30, 2013	44:36	Hollywood Records; Marvel Music	
Guardians of the Galaxy: Awesome Mix Vol. 1 (Original Motion Picture Soundtrack)	July 29, 2014	44:34	Hollywood Records; Marvel Music	

=== Phase Three films ===
Score albums for Phase Three films
Title	U.S. release date	Length	Composer	Label(s)	Ref.
Captain America: Civil War (Original Motion Picture Soundtrack)	May 6, 2016	69:09	Henry Jackman	Hollywood Records; Marvel Music	
Doctor Strange (Original Motion Picture Soundtrack)	October 21, 2016	66:28	Michael Giacchino	Hollywood Records; Marvel Music	
Guardians of the Galaxy Vol. 2 (Original Score)	April 21, 2017	43:34	Tyler Bates	Hollywood Records; Marvel Music	
Spider-Man: Homecoming (Original Motion Picture Soundtrack)	July 7, 2017	66:40	Michael Giacchino	Sony Masterworks	
Thor: Ragnarok (Original Motion Picture Soundtrack)	October 20, 2017	72:52	Mark Mothersbaugh	Hollywood Records; Marvel Music	
Black Panther (Original Score)	February 16, 2018	95:07	Ludwig Göransson	Hollywood Records; Marvel Music	
Avengers: Infinity War (Original Motion Picture Soundtrack)	April 27, 2018	71:36	Alan Silvestri	Hollywood Records; Marvel Music	
Ant-Man and the Wasp (Original Motion Picture Soundtrack)	July 6, 2018	56:13	Christophe Beck	Hollywood Records; Marvel Music	
Captain Marvel (Original Motion Picture Soundtrack)	March 8, 2019	67:28	Pinar Toprak	Hollywood Records; Marvel Music	
Avengers: Endgame (Original Motion Picture Soundtrack)	April 26, 2019	116:00	Alan Silvestri	Hollywood Records; Marvel Music	
Spider-Man: Far From Home (Original Motion Picture Soundtrack)	July 2, 2019	79:43	Michael Giacchino	Sony Classical Records	

For Endgame, Silvestri reprised his own themes from previous films and also made references to multiple other MCU scores, including Toprak's Captain Marvel, Giacchino's Doctor Strange, Beck's Ant-Man, Bates's Guardians of the Galaxy, and Mothersbaugh's Ragnarok. Coinciding with Endgame's release, Mondo began releasing vinyl albums for all MCU films so far, starting with Ant-Man and the Wasp, Black Panther, and Ragnarok.

Compilation albums for Phase Three films
Title	U.S. release date	Length	Labels	Ref.
Guardians of the Galaxy Vol. 2: Awesome Mix Vol. 2 (Original Motion Picture Soundtrack)	April 21, 2017	51:59	Hollywood Records; Marvel Music	
Black Panther: The Album	February 9, 2018	49:12	Interscope Records; Top Dawg Entertainment; Aftermath Entertainment	

Awesome Mix Vol. 2 features the original end credits song "Guardians Inferno". Black Panther: The Album, curated by Kendrick Lamar, includes the singles "All the Stars", "King's Dead", and "Pray for Me".

=== Phase Four films ===
Score albums for Phase Four films
Title	U.S. release date	Length	Composer(s)	Label(s)	Ref.
Black Widow (Original Motion Picture Soundtrack)	July 9, 2021	79:53	Lorne Balfe	Hollywood Records; Marvel Music	
Shang-Chi and the Legend of the Ten Rings (Original Score)	September 1, 2021	68:19	Joel P. West	Hollywood Records; Marvel Music	
Eternals (Original Motion Picture Soundtrack)	November 3, 2021	68:17	Ramin Djawadi	Hollywood Records; Marvel Music	
Spider-Man: No Way Home (Original Motion Picture Soundtrack)	December 17, 2021	73:54	Michael Giacchino	Sony Classical Records	
Doctor Strange in the Multiverse of Madness (Original Motion Picture Soundtrack)	May 4, 2022	61:25	Danny Elfman	Hollywood Records; Marvel Music	
Thor: Love and Thunder (Original Motion Picture Soundtrack)	July 6, 2022	59:03	Michael Giacchino and Nami Melumad	Hollywood Records; Marvel Music	
Black Panther: Wakanda Forever (Original Score)	November 11, 2022	83:00	Ludwig Göransson	Hollywood Records; Marvel Music	

Compilation albums for Phase Four films
Title	U.S. release date	Length	Labels	Ref.
Shang-Chi and the Legend of the Ten Rings: The Album	September 3, 2021	61:37	Hollywood Records; Marvel Music; Interscope Records	
Wakanda Forever Prologue	July 25, 2022	9:33	Hollywood Records; Marvel Music	
Black Panther: Wakanda Forever – Music from and Inspired By	November 4, 2022	66:18	Hollywood Records; Roc Nation; Def Jam Recordings	

Shang-Chi and the Legend of the Ten Rings: The Album includes the original song "Run It" by DJ Snake, while Black Panther: Wakanda Forever features the original song "Lift Me Up" by Rihanna.

=== Phase Five films ===
Score albums for Phase Five films
Title	U.S. release date	Length	Composer(s)	Labels	Ref.
Ant-Man and the Wasp: Quantumania (Original Motion Picture Soundtrack)	February 15, 2023	60:14	Christophe Beck	Hollywood Records; Marvel Music	
Guardians of the Galaxy Vol. 3 (Original Score)	May 3, 2023	63:02	John Murphy	Hollywood Records; Marvel Music	
The Marvels (Original Motion Picture Soundtrack)	November 8, 2023	68:29	Laura Karpman	Hollywood Records; Marvel Music	
Deadpool & Wolverine (Original Score)	July 24, 2024	61:51	Rob Simonsen	Hollywood Records; Marvel Music	
Captain America: Brave New World (Original Motion Picture Soundtrack)	February 12, 2025	72:07	Laura Karpman	Hollywood Records; Marvel Music	
Thunderbolts* (Original Motion Picture Soundtrack)	April 30, 2025	48:31	Son Lux	Hollywood Records; Marvel Music	

Compilation albums for Phase Five films
Title	U.S. release date	Length	Label(s)	Ref.
Guardians of the Galaxy Vol. 3: Awesome Mix Vol. 3 (Original Motion Picture Soundtrack)	May 3, 2023	65:13	Hollywood Records; Marvel Music	
Deadpool & Wolverine (Original Motion Picture Soundtrack)	July 24, 2024	61:52	Hollywood Records; Marvel Music	
Deadpool & Wolverine: Madonna's "Like a Prayer" EP	August 9, 2024	11:00	Warner Records	

Deadpool & Wolverine includes the single "Slash" by Stray Kids.

=== Phase Six films ===
Albums for Phase Six films
Title	U.S. release date	Length	Composer	Label(s)	Ref.
The Fantastic Four: First Steps (Original Motion Picture Soundtrack)	July 18, 2025	82:07	Michael Giacchino	Hollywood Records; Marvel Music	
Spider-Man: Brand New Day (Original Motion Picture Soundtrack)	July 31, 2026	77:38	Michael Giacchino	Sony Classical Records	
Avengers: Doomsday	TBA	TBD	Alan Silvestri	TBA	
Avengers: Secret Wars	TBA	TBD	Alan Silvestri	TBA	

== Marvel Television series ==
=== ABC series ===
Albums for ABC series
Title	U.S. release date	Length	Composer	Labels	Ref.
Marvel's Agents of S.H.I.E.L.D. (Original Soundtrack Album)	September 4, 2015	77:52	Bear McCreary	Hollywood Records; Marvel Music	
Marvel's Agent Carter: Season 1 (Original Television Soundtrack)	December 11, 2015	65:31	Christopher Lennertz	Hollywood Records; Marvel Music	

=== Netflix series ===
Albums for Netflix series
Series	Title	U.S. release date	Length	Composer(s)	Labels	Ref.
Daredevil	Original Soundtrack Album	April 27, 2015	41:45	John Paesano	Hollywood Records; Marvel Music	
Daredevil	Season 2 (Original Soundtrack Album)	July 15, 2016	50:49	John Paesano	Hollywood Records; Marvel Music	
Daredevil	Season 3 (Original Soundtrack Album)	October 19, 2018	75:03	John Paesano	Hollywood Records; Marvel Music	
Jessica Jones	Original Soundtrack	June 3, 2016	59:53	Sean Callery	Hollywood Records; Marvel Music	
Jessica Jones	Season 2 (Original Soundtrack)	March 16, 2018	51:75	Sean Callery	Hollywood Records; Marvel Music	
Jessica Jones	Season 3 (Original Soundtrack)	July 19, 2019	57:51	Sean Callery	Hollywood Records; Marvel Music	
Luke Cage	Original Soundtrack Album	October 7, 2016	95:09	Adrian Younge and Ali Shaheed Muhammad	Hollywood Records; Marvel Music	
Luke Cage	Season 2 (Original Soundtrack Album)	June 22, 2018	90:21	Adrian Younge and Ali Shaheed Muhammad	Hollywood Records; Marvel Music	
Iron Fist	Original Soundtrack	March 17, 2017	62:00	Trevor Morris	Hollywood Records; Marvel Music	
Iron Fist	Season 2 (Original Soundtrack)	September 7, 2018	39:12	Robert Lydecker	Hollywood Records; Marvel Music	
The Defenders	Original Soundtrack Album	August 17, 2017	49:15	John Paesano	Hollywood Records; Marvel Music	
The Punisher	Original Soundtrack	November 17, 2017	42:52	Tyler Bates	Hollywood Records; Marvel Music	
The Punisher	Season 2 (Original Soundtrack)	January 18, 2019	51:52	Tyler Bates	Hollywood Records; Marvel Music	

Mondo released vinyl albums for the first seasons of Luke Cage, Daredevil, Jessica Jones, and Iron Fist, as well as The Defenders, each pressed on a different colored vinyl and packaged with collectible artwork.

=== Young adult series ===
Score albums for young adult series
Title	U.S. release date	Length	Composer	Labels	Ref.
Runaways (Original Score)	January 26, 2018	44:57	Siddhartha Khosla	Hollywood Records; Marvel Music	
Cloak & Dagger (Original Score)	June 8, 2018	41:25	Mark Isham	Hollywood Records; Marvel Music	
Cloak & Dagger: Season 2 (Original Score)	May 24, 2019	49:04	Mark Isham	Hollywood Records; Marvel Music	

Compilation albums for young adult series
Title	U.S. release date	Length	Labels	Ref.
Runaways (Original Soundtrack)	January 12, 2018	50:08	Hollywood Records; Marvel Music	
Cloak & Dagger (Original Television Series Soundtrack)	June 8, 2018	41:31	Hollywood Records; Marvel Music	

== Marvel Studios series ==
=== Phase Four series ===
Albums for Phase Four series
Series	Title	U.S. release date	Length	Composer(s)	Labels	Ref.
WandaVision	Episode 1 (Original Soundtrack)	January 22, 2021	9:14	Christophe Beck, Kristen Anderson-Lopez, and Robert Lopez	Hollywood Records; Marvel Music	
WandaVision	Episode 2 (Original Soundtrack)	January 22, 2021	7:37	Christophe Beck, Kristen Anderson-Lopez, and Robert Lopez	Hollywood Records; Marvel Music	
WandaVision	Episode 3 (Original Soundtrack)	January 29, 2021	12:31	Christophe Beck, Kristen Anderson-Lopez, and Robert Lopez	Hollywood Records; Marvel Music	
WandaVision	Episode 4 (Original Soundtrack)	February 5, 2021	18:13	Christophe Beck	Hollywood Records; Marvel Music	
WandaVision	Episode 5 (Original Soundtrack)	February 12, 2021	16:19	Christophe Beck, Kristen Anderson-Lopez, and Robert Lopez	Hollywood Records; Marvel Music	
WandaVision	Episode 6 (Original Soundtrack)	February 19, 2021	19:28	Christophe Beck, Kristen Anderson-Lopez, and Robert Lopez	Hollywood Records; Marvel Music	
WandaVision	Episode 7 (Original Soundtrack)	February 23, 2021	18:43	Christophe Beck, Kristen Anderson-Lopez, and Robert Lopez	Hollywood Records; Marvel Music	
WandaVision	Episode 8 (Original Soundtrack)	March 5, 2021	32:15	Christophe Beck	Hollywood Records; Marvel Music	
WandaVision	Episode 9 (Original Soundtrack)	March 12, 2021	36:06	Christophe Beck	Hollywood Records; Marvel Music	
The Falcon and the Winter Soldier	Vol. 1 (Episodes 1–3) (Original Soundtrack)	April 9, 2021	58:54	Henry Jackman	Hollywood Records; Marvel Music	
The Falcon and the Winter Soldier	Vol. 2 (Episodes 4–6) (Original Soundtrack)	April 30, 2021	60:33	Henry Jackman	Hollywood Records; Marvel Music	
Loki season 1	Vol. 1 (Episodes 1–3) (Original Soundtrack)	July 2, 2021	49:33	Natalie Holt	Hollywood Records; Marvel Music	
Loki season 1	Vol. 2 (Episodes 4–6) (Original Soundtrack)	July 23, 2021	66:17	Natalie Holt	Hollywood Records; Marvel Music	
What If...? season 1	Episode 1 (Original Soundtrack)	August 13, 2021	23:48	Laura Karpman	Hollywood Records; Marvel Music	
What If...? season 1	Episode 2 (Original Soundtrack)	August 23, 2021	22:35	Laura Karpman	Hollywood Records; Marvel Music	
What If...? season 1	Episode 3 (Original Soundtrack)	August 27, 2021	25:02	Laura Karpman	Hollywood Records; Marvel Music	
What If...? season 1	Episode 4 (Original Soundtrack)	September 3, 2021	30:09	Laura Karpman	Hollywood Records; Marvel Music	
What If...? season 1	Episode 5 (Original Soundtrack)	September 10, 2021	24:47	Laura Karpman	Hollywood Records; Marvel Music	
What If...? season 1	Episode 6 (Original Soundtrack)	September 17, 2021	20:49	Laura Karpman	Hollywood Records; Marvel Music	
What If...? season 1	Episode 7 (Original Soundtrack)	September 24, 2021	21:40	Laura Karpman	Hollywood Records; Marvel Music	
What If...? season 1	Episode 8 (Original Soundtrack)	October 1, 2021	21:14	Laura Karpman	Hollywood Records; Marvel Music	
What If...? season 1	Episode 9 (Original Soundtrack)	October 8, 2021	30:09	Laura Karpman	Hollywood Records; Marvel Music	
Hawkeye	Vol. 1 (Episodes 1–3) (Original Soundtrack)	December 10, 2021	47:23	Christophe Beck and Michael Paraskevas	Hollywood Records; Marvel Music	
Hawkeye	Vol. 2 (Episodes 4–6) (Original Soundtrack)	December 22, 2021	53:37	Christophe Beck and Michael Paraskevas	Hollywood Records; Marvel Music	
Moon Knight	Original Soundtrack	April 27, 2022	85:22	Hesham Nazih	Hollywood Records; Marvel Music	
Ms. Marvel	Vol. 1 (Episodes 1–3) (Original Soundtrack)	June 22, 2022	49:29	Laura Karpman	Hollywood Records; Marvel Music	
Ms. Marvel	Vol. 2 (Episodes 4–6) (Original Soundtrack)	July 13, 2022	88:29	Laura Karpman	Hollywood Records; Marvel Music	
She-Hulk: Attorney at Law	Vol. 1 (Episodes 1–4) (Original Soundtrack)	September 16, 2022	52:17	Amie Doherty	Hollywood Records; Marvel Music	
She-Hulk: Attorney at Law	Vol. 2 (Episodes 5–9) (Original Soundtrack)	October 18, 2022	62:35	Amie Doherty	Hollywood Records; Marvel Music	

What If...? shows what would happen if major moments from MCU films occurred differently; Karpman took inspiration from Silvestri's Endgame approach to "touch on" existing themes from relevant film composers.

=== Phase Five series ===
Albums for Phase Five series
Series	Title	U.S. release date	Length	Composer(s)	Labels	Ref.
Secret Invasion	Vol. 1 (Episodes 1–3) (Original Soundtrack)	July 12, 2023	46:59	Kris Bowers	Hollywood Records; Marvel Music	
Secret Invasion	Vol. 2 (Episodes 4–6) (Original Soundtrack)	August 4, 2023	54:11	Kris Bowers	Hollywood Records; Marvel Music	
Loki season 2	Vol. 1 (Episodes 1–3) (Original Soundtrack)	October 27, 2023	52:07	Natalie Holt	Hollywood Records; Marvel Music	
Loki season 2	Vol. 2 (Episodes 4–6) (Original Soundtrack)	November 17, 2023	69:34	Natalie Holt	Hollywood Records; Marvel Music	
What If...? season 2	Episode 3 (Original Soundtrack)	December 15, 2023	4:51	Laura Karpman and Nora Kroll-Rosenbaum	Hollywood Records; Marvel Music	
What If...? season 2	Original Soundtrack	January 5, 2024	32:00	Laura Karpman and Nora Kroll-Rosenbaum	Hollywood Records; Marvel Music	
Echo	Original Soundtrack	January 12, 2024	77:00	Dave Porter	Hollywood Records; Marvel Music	
Agatha All Along	Songs from Episodes 1 & 2	September 18, 2024	4:59	Kristen Anderson-Lopez and Robert Lopez	Hollywood Records; Marvel Music	
Agatha All Along	Songs from Episode 4	October 2, 2024	9:19	Kristen Anderson-Lopez and Robert Lopez	Hollywood Records; Marvel Music	
Agatha All Along	Vol. 1 (Episodes 1–5) (Original Soundtrack)	October 11, 2024	75:11	Christophe Beck, Michael Paraskevas, Kristen Anderson-Lopez, and Robert Lopez	Hollywood Records; Marvel Music	
Agatha All Along	Songs from Episode 9	October 31, 2024	3:23	Kristen Anderson-Lopez and Robert Lopez	Hollywood Records; Marvel Music	
Agatha All Along	Vol. 2 (Episodes 6–9) (Original Soundtrack)	November 1, 2024	76:45	Christophe Beck, Michael Paraskevas, Kristen Anderson-Lopez, and Robert Lopez	Hollywood Records; Marvel Music	
What If...? season 3	Original Soundtrack	January 10, 2025	58:00	Laura Karpman and Nora Kroll-Rosenbaum	Hollywood Records; Marvel Music	
Your Friendly Neighborhood Spider-Man season 1	Original Soundtrack	February 21, 2025	63:00	Leo Birenberg and Zach Robinson	Hollywood Records; Marvel Music	
Daredevil: Born Again season 1	Episodes 1–4 (Original Soundtrack)	March 28, 2025	33:42	The Newton Brothers	Hollywood Records; Marvel Music	
Daredevil: Born Again season 1	Episodes 5–9 (Original Soundtrack)	April 18, 2025	44:14	The Newton Brothers	Hollywood Records; Marvel Music	
Ironheart	Vol. 1 (Episodes 1–3) (Original Soundtrack)	June 24, 2025	49:23	Dara Taylor	Hollywood Records; Marvel Music	
Ironheart	Vol. 2 (Episodes 4–6) (Original Soundtrack)	July 1, 2025	77:25	Dara Taylor	Hollywood Records; Marvel Music	

=== Phase Six series ===
Albums for Phase Six series
Series	Title	U.S. release date	Length	Composer(s)	Labels	Ref.
Eyes of Wakanda	Original Soundtrack	August 8, 2025	61:02	Hesham Nazih	Hollywood Records; Marvel Music	
Marvel Zombies season 1	Original Soundtrack	September 26, 2025	72:00	Laura Karpman and Nora Kroll-Rosenbaum	Hollywood Records; Marvel Music	
Wonder Man	Original Soundtrack	January 30, 2026	41:34	Joel P. West	Hollywood Records; Marvel Music	
Daredevil: Born Again season 2	Vol. 1 (Episodes 1–4) (Original Soundtrack)	April 7, 2026	39:34	The Newton Brothers	Hollywood Records; Marvel Music	
Daredevil: Born Again season 2	Vol. 2 (Episodes 5–8) (Original Soundtrack)	May 5, 2026	44:27	The Newton Brothers	Hollywood Records; Marvel Music	
VisionQuest	Vol. 1 (Episodes 1–4) (Original Soundtrack)	October 22, 2026	79:46	Mick Giacchino	Hollywood Records; Marvel Music	
VisionQuest	Vol. 2 (Episodes 5–8) (Original Soundtrack)	November 12, 2026	79:51	Mick Giacchino	Hollywood Records; Marvel Music	

== Television specials ==
=== Phase Four specials ===
Albums for Phase Four specials
Title	U.S. release date	Length	Composer	Labels	Ref.
Marvel Studios' Werewolf by Night (Original Soundtrack)	October 7, 2022	41:25	Michael Giacchino	Hollywood Records; Marvel Music	
The Guardians of the Galaxy Holiday Special (Original Soundtrack)	November 23, 2022	22:44	John Murphy	Hollywood Records; Marvel Music	

=== Phase Six specials ===
Albums for Phase Six specials
Title	U.S. release date	Length	Composer	Labels	Ref.
The Punisher: One Last Kill (Original Soundtrack)	May 15, 2026	24:22	Kris Bowers	Hollywood Records; Marvel Music	

== Short films ==
The Marvel One-Shot short films The Consultant and A Funny Thing Happened on the Way to Thor's Hammer (both 2011) feature music by DJ Oakenfold. Christopher Lennertz composed the music for Item 47 (2012) and Agent Carter (2013), while Brian Tyler returned from Iron Man 3 for the spin-off short All Hail the King (2014). That short features the title sequence for Caged Heat, a fictional 1980s television pilot, with a theme tune composed by Mike Post who worked on influential 1980s series such as The A-Team (1983–1987). The music for the I Am Groot (2022–2023) animated shorts was composed by Daniele Luppi.

== Original songs ==
The following are noteworthy fictional songs that have been created for MCU projects:

- "Make Way For Tomorrow, Today": The theme song for Iron Man 2's 1974 Stark Expo, written by Richard M. Sherman. A variation of the song was used for the 1943 Stark Expo in The First Avenger.
- "Star Spangled Man":
  The First Avenger features a montage of Captain America and a chorus line touring the U.S. to sell war bonds for World War II. They perform the patriotic song "Star Spangled Man", which was written by composer Alan Menken and lyricist David Zippel. The song has been used for multiple other MCU projects, including as the theme music for a 1940s Captain America radio drama in the series Agent Carter; performed by a marching band for a media event featuring the new Captain America, John Walker, in The Falcon and the Winter Soldier; and as background music at AvengerCon in Ms. Marvel.
- "Whatcha Gonna Do (It's Up to You)": A Broadway-style song and dance number from the Agent Carter episode "A Little Song and Dance", written by Lennertz and Zippel
- "Bulletproof Love": Method Man guest stars in the Luke Cage episode "Soliloquy of Chaos" and performs an original rap song about Cage, arranged by Adrian Younge and Ali Shaheed Muhammad
- "I Want Your Cray Cray": A song from former child star Trish Walker's brief pop-star career, as seen in a flashback during the Jessica Jones episode "AKA I Want Your Cray Cray"
- WandaVision songs:
  Kristen Anderson-Lopez and Robert Lopez composed multiple original theme songs for WandaVision, including "A Newlywed Couple", a 1950s-style opening theme for the episode "Filmed Before a Live Studio Audience"; "WandaVision!", a minimalist, jazz-inspired, 1960s-style theme for the episode "Don't Touch That Dial"; "We Got Something Cooking", based on themes of family and pregnancy, for the episode "Now in Color"; "Making It Up As We Go Along", a theme song that channels 1980s rock and pop singers for the episode "On a Very Special Episode..."; "Let's Keep It Going", a 1990s punk rock theme featuring riot grrrl artist Kathleen Hanna for the episode "All-New Halloween Spooktacular!"; and "Agatha All Along", a theme song for the character Agatha Harkness's reveal in the episode "Breaking the Fourth Wall".
- "Save the City": A number from the fictional Broadway musical Rogers: The Musical that is seen in Hawkeye, written by Marc Shaiman and Scott Wittman
- "I Don't Know What Christmas Is (But Christmastime Is Here)": An original Christmas song from writer and director James Gunn and the band Old 97's for The Guardians of the Galaxy Holiday Special
- "The Ballad of the Witches' Road": Anderson-Lopez and Lopez wrote eight different versions of this song for the WandaVision spin-off Agatha All Along
- "Don't Kill the World": An original song for the VisionQuest finale, "Forever", written by Anderson-Lopez and Lopez and performed by Jonathan Coulton

== Other music ==
=== Marvel Studios fanfares ===
After Marvel Entertainment was acquired by the Walt Disney Company, Marvel Studios became its "own entity" and the studio's logo started to be the only production logo shown at the start of its films beginning with The Dark World. Previously, the Marvel Entertainment logo was shown along with the logo for that film's distributor. With this change, Marvel Studios commissioned a new opening logo featuring a fanfare by The Dark World composer Tyler. Marvel Studios president Kevin Feige explained, "We didn't want to re-invent the wheel [from the previous logo], but we wanted it to feel bigger, to feel more substantial, [and] like all great studio logos, you need a fanfare, and we'd never had that before." Because of how short the logo sequence is, Tyler said he needed a simple "whistler" rather than a full melody, supported by "fantastical" strings.

Marvel Studios logo animation introduced in 2016, featuring a fanfare by composer Michael Giacchino (0:37)

After Marvel Studios was integrated into Walt Disney Studios in 2015, a new Marvel Studios logo was introduced starting with Doctor Strange. It features imagery from the MCU rather than Marvel's general history and the comics, and is accompanied by a new fanfare by Doctor Strange composer Michael Giacchino. Giacchino used alternate fanfares for the logo sequence in some of his other MCU films: for Homecoming, a version of the Spider-Man theme song from the animated series Spider-Man (1967–1970) is heard; a rock version of the fanfare is played in the opening of Love and Thunder; and a horror version is played in the opening of Werewolf by Night.

Marvel's Special Presentation television specials feature an opening sequence that is an homage to the CBS Special Presentation opening featured before animated holiday specials of the 1980s and 1990s. Giacchino also composed the fanfare for this sequence, inspired by the CBS opening's music.

=== Related media ===
- Tyler also provided the music for the non-fiction television special Marvel Studios: Assembling a Universe (2014).
- In February 2016, a commercial directed by the Russo brothers for Coca-Cola mini cans, starring Ant-Man and the Hulk, aired during Super Bowl 50. The ad was scored by Christophe Beck and Jeff Morrow, who contributed additional music to Ant-Man.
- The music for the Avengers Campus area at Disney California Adventure was composed by John Paesano, who referenced musical themes from the Avengers, Spider-Man, Doctor Strange, Guardians of the Galaxy, Ant-Man, Captain Marvel, and Black Panther films.
- After the song "Save the City" from the fictional Rogers: The Musical Broadway show was seen in Hawkeye, an expanded one-act version of the musical was created for Disney California Adventure with five new songs by Lennertz, Jordan Peterson, and Alex Karukas.
- Loki composer Natalie Holt composed the fanfare for Infinity Vision, Disney's premium large format certification program that was created for the re-release Avengers Endgame: Encore (2026) and Doomsday.

== Reception ==
Devindra Hardawar of the /Filmcast podcast felt The Avengers was a lost opportunity to have an identifiable theme for each MCU hero. Hardawar believed one composer should be retained for each main character who could build on their own material over time, creating a consistent sound that could also be used for crossovers. When Tyler was announced as the composer for Age of Ultron, James Garcia discussed the "forgettable" music of the MCU films for We Got This Covered and stated that Tyler's work on Iron Man 3 and The Dark World was just "alright". He said The Avengers had the only memorable theme of the franchise, and contrasted this with the memorable work of composers John Williams, Hans Zimmer, and Danny Elfman for other superhero films. Flickering Myth's Simon Columb said Garcia was underselling the issue, believing the MCU's music was "a core element [of filmmaking] that is consistently below par... the soundtracks have always felt unclear, confused and inconsistent". He opined that Marvel Studios did not understand the importance of music in films and criticized the decision to have "mixed-and-matched composers". Noting that the MCU had been compared by some to the Star Wars franchise, Garcia said those comparisons did not hold up when considering Williams's work on the music for those films. Emmet Asher-Perrin at Reactor reiterated these concerns and questioned why the same focus on consistency that was being applied to other parts of the franchise was not being used for the music.

Alan Silvestri's MCU Themes
Alan Silvestri's "Captain America March" (0:00 – 0:17) and "The Avengers" (0:17 – 0:33) are considered to be some of the more memorable MCU themes.

Reviewing Tyler's Phase Two scores for Filmtracks, Christian Clemmenson agreed that music for MCU films had "always struggled to form any kind of cohesive identity". He felt Alan Silvestri had been the most successful at creating memorable themes in his Captain America and The Avengers scores. Clemmenson said Tyler established an appropriate tone for the franchise with Iron Man 3 and The Dark World, and praised the composer's efforts to maintain that sound in Age of Ultron along with Elfman's work evolving Silvestri's Avengers theme. However, Clemmenson criticized the "inexplicable" decision to abandon all of Patrick Doyle's Thor themes and ultimately described the score for Age of Ultron as "functional". He said it also continued a pattern for the MCU of the music being poorly edited into the film. John Coggin, writing for International Policy Digest, echoed previous thoughts about the MCU not having a consistent composer or thematic continuity. He pointed to Williams's Star Wars scores, Jerry Goldsmith's work for the Star Trek franchise, and Howard Shore's music for the Lord of the Rings film trilogy as examples of big film franchises that successfully followed this musical approach. Coggin was positive about Silvestri's "Captain America March", but it was Patrick Doyle that he felt had written the best thematic score of the franchise before Tyler "remarkably" discarded those ideas for The Dark World.

External videos
- The Marvel Symphonic Universe, a video essay about the music of the MCU by the YouTube channel Every Frame a Painting

In September 2016, YouTube channel Every Frame a Painting released a video essay about the music of the MCU titled "The Marvel Symphonic Universe". The video posits that the MCU does not have any memorable music like other major film franchises, and discusses several reasons why this could be the case: music that fades into the background rather than eliciting an emotional response; predictable musical choices such as closely following the obvious beats of a scene; other sound effects and dialogue covering the music; and the use of temp tracks during editing which can lead to music sounding very similar to previous film scores. The essay concludes that the music is "bland and inoffensive" because Marvel Studios was taking a safe approach, and they needed to take more risks in order to fix this issue. The video received attention from multiple commentators, and Mark Mothersbaugh said it directly informed his attempts to compose more unique and memorable music for Ragnarok. Ben Kuchera at Polygon said the video was a good look at what goes into making modern film scores, but felt it focused too much on the impacts of using temp music. Kuchera believed the lack of memorable themes and a reluctance to give music precedence in the films' sound mix were bigger issues for the franchise. Composer and writer Dan Golding responded to Every Frame a Painting with his own video essay titled "A Theory of Film Music", which downplays the impact of temp music due to it being a technique that has always existed in film scoring. Golding instead attributed the MCU's music issues to the influence of Zimmer, who pioneered a modern style of film scoring that relies on computers and avoids more traditional melodies and instruments.

/Film's Jacob Hall questioned whether Marvel Studios was attempting to "directly confront its music problem" with the hiring of Giacchino for Doctor Strange and the announcement of Silvestri's return for Infinity War and Endgame. He said many of the MCU films to that point had been scored with "the musical equivalent of vanilla pudding" and highlighted Silvestri's "Captain America March" and Avengers themes as the only identifiable melodies of the franchise. Hall was particularly excited about Giacchino's hiring, pointing to the composer's history of writing memorable themes for many films and projects. In 2018, Adam Chitwood at Collider wrote that the MCU's film scores were "finally becoming memorable" during the franchise's Phase Three, starting with Giacchino's work on Doctor Strange and Homecoming. He also highlighted Mothersbaugh's score for Ragnarok and Ludwig Göransson's work on Black Panther, the latter becoming the first MCU film to win the Academy Award for Best Original Score. Chitwood said Marvel Studios had become more ambitious with their scores and with their films in general, and believed this change correlated with the studio's split from Marvel Entertainment in 2015. Reviewing Endgame's score, Clemmenson said the music of the MCU was finally starting to "gel"—despite the continued "haphazard musical handling" of characters like Iron Man—thanks to Silvestri now having a consistent involvement in the franchise and the decision to reference other composers' work for that film.

== Infinity Saga concert experience ==
Marvel Studios' Infinity Saga Concert Experience was announced in May 2024 from Disney Concerts, Marvel Studios, and the Los Angeles Philharmonic. It premiered at the Hollywood Bowl on August 30 and 31, with the Philharmonic's Music and Artistic director Gustavo Dudamel conducting live-to-picture. The concert featured a "specially created score" of pieces from the MCU's Infinity Saga, covering the films from Phases One to Three, with the first half focused on individual character themes and the second on music from Infinity War and Endgame. A "post-credits scene" saw the Philharmonic preview Giacchino's theme from The Fantastic Four: First Steps. The performances used projection mapping on the Hollywood Bowl's proscenium while audience members wore PixMob light-up wrist bands. The concert went on tour globally in 2025.
