= The Fantastic Four: First Steps (soundtrack) =

The Fantastic Four: First Steps (Original Motion Picture Soundtrack)

Film score by Michael Giacchino
- Released: July 18, 2025 (digital)
- Recorded: 2025
- Venue: London
- Studio: Abbey Road Studios
- Genre: Film score
- Length: 82:07
- Labels: Hollywood; Marvel Music

Michael Giacchino chronology
IF (2024)	The Fantastic Four: First Steps (Original Motion Picture Soundtrack) (2025)	Zootopia 2 (2025)

The Fantastic Four: First Steps (Original Motion Picture Soundtrack) is the film score for the Marvel Studios film The Fantastic Four: First Steps. The score was composed by Michael Giacchino. Hollywood Records released the album digitally on July 18, 2025.

== Background ==
Michael Giacchino was announced to be composing the score in July 2024, after scoring various MCU projects, and his music for the Fantastic Four and Galactus was previewed during a drone show at SDCC that month. His main Fantastic Four theme was played in full at the D23 convention in August during a "Music of Marvel Studios" panel that Giacchino moderated, and at the Hollywood Bowl later that month as part of Marvel Studios' Infinity Saga Concert Experience. Mike Roe of TheWrap called the theme "a jaunty vibe" that "blends a dreamy sense with future-looking heroic optimism, along with elements that echo the sounds you might expect from a film featuring, say, a space launch". He likened it to the score of the MCU film Ant-Man (2015). The theme was released as a digital download single from Hollywood Records and Marvel Music on June 5, 2025, and will be available as a 7-inch vinyl along with "Let Us Be Devoured", written and performed by Andrea Datzman, on July 25. Giacchino's full score was released on July 18, 2025.

== Track listing ==
All music composed by Michael Giacchino.

The Fantastic Four: First Steps (Original Motion Picture Soundtrack) track listing
No.	Title	Length
1.	"The Fantastic Four: First Steps Main Theme Extended Version"	4:10
2.	"Pregnancy Testing 1, 2, 3"	1:58
3.	"Fantastic Four, First Cue"	5:34
4.	"Herald Today, Gone Tomorrow"	3:48
5.	"Out to Launch"	6:10
6.	"A Galactus Case of the Munchies"	3:08
7.	"Bowel Before Me"	3:08
8.	"The Light Speed of Your Life"	3:43
9.	"Nothing Neutron Under the Sun"	2:23
10.	"Starship Birth"	5:07
11.	"Span-tastic Voyage"	6:36
12.	"The Bridges of Silver Surfer County"	1:34
13.	"A Mole in Your Plan"	3:09
14.	"A Walk on the City"	6:09
15.	"The Other Sue Drops"	5:34
16.	"Don't Sue the Baby!"	2:53
17.	"Without Further Adieu"	1:24
18.	"Carseat Drivers"	1:17
19.	"Fantastic Four to Be Reckoned With"	2:28
20.	"The Galactus/Silver Surfer Suite"	7:24
21.	"Tripping the Lights Fantastic"	2:16
22.	"The Fantastic Four Power Hour (Cartoon Theme)"	0:34
23.	"The Ted Gilbert Show" (featuring Andrea Datzman)	0:40
24.	"Let Us Be Devoured (Studio Version)" (featuring Andrea Datzman)	3:42
25.	"H.E.R.B.I.E.'s Lullaby" (featuring Matthew Wood)	1:18
Total length:		82:07

== Additional music ==
Eight additional songs were found in the film, "Guanacoa" by Juan García Esquivel, "Oogum Boogum Song" by Brenton Wood, "Nation on Wheels" by George Bruns, "Let's Get Lost" by Chet Baker, "A Taste of the Same" by The Bad Seeds, "Yours Is the Life" by Paul Martin, "Monster Mash" by Bobby "Boris" Pickett and the Crypt-Kickers.

== Reception ==
Filmtracks.com gave the score a positive four-star review, stating that it served as a "highly repetitive [...], solid return to his symphonic comfort zone".

== Charts ==
Chart performance for The Fantastic Four: First Steps (Original Motion Picture Soundtrack)
Chart (2025)	Peak position
UK Album Downloads (OCC)	76
UK Soundtrack Albums (OCC)	24
