= The Marvels (soundtrack) =

The Marvels (Original Motion Picture Soundtrack)

Film score by Laura Karpman
- Released: November 8, 2023
- Genre: Film score
- Length: 65:00
- Labels: Hollywood; Marvel Music

Laura Karpman chronology
Epic Bil (2022)	The Marvels (Original Motion Picture Soundtrack) (2023)	American Fiction (2023)

The Marvels (Original Motion Picture Soundtrack) is the soundtrack to the Marvel Studios film of the same name. The score, composed by Laura Karpman, was released by Hollywood Records on November 8, 2023, in the United States.

== Background ==
In January 2022, Laura Karpman was hired to compose the score for the film, after previously doing so for the first season of the MCU television series What If...? (2021) and Ms. Marvel (2022). DaCosta wanted her a new theme as it was not a sequel, but about a collaboration between superheroes, as "It's like the relationship of Captain America to The Avengers This is a collaboration that needed its own sound, power and creative juice. She wanted an original theme and she wanted low, male voices." In late-2022, Karpman recorded a "space opera", as per DaCosta's request, seeking Basso profundo, bass singers, and male countertenors having them "sing in their falsettos, which meant they were singing in their head voice to give an odd sound". In order to provide musical diversity, she brought in South American, African and Indian Carnatic singers so that "every vocal tradition was brought to bear" and had them to sing what they wanted to and not to blend everything. Therefore, three choirs were recorded in both Los Angeles and London. Karpman, then recorded strange percussion noises for which she went to Scottish percussionist Evelyn Glennie, for the same, what she described it as "space junk" and used titanium disks, that are being bowed and beaten to make strange sounds.

The piece "The Marvels" was performed at the Philadelphia Orchestra on June 3, 2023. It is a concise version of music that Karpman worked on before composing the score. Karpman explained that she wanted the suite to have "certain kinds of leaps" within the music to represent Danvers's flight, while also having "power", "drive", and "play in it" to represent Danvers, Rambeau and Khan coming together as a trio. For Khan's theme, Karpman resolved to bring in some "fantastic" musicians from Pakistan and India to collaborate with her to make an important theme that could represent Khan's heritage most of the time, creating incredible sounds that "augment, blend and explode" a traditional Marvel superhero, opining that a character like Khan shouldn't be othered and that her "big grown superhero" theme is about her adolescence, considering how her background was important in her show. She also researched on what sound in space may be like for the cosmic adventure scenes. Dar-Benn's theme had a "slithered instrumentation" that felt important for her character. While recording her theme, she listened to a Herbie Hancock song in flute, which inspired her to use flutes as her main sound for the character. A wide range of flutes, from tiny piccolo to contrabass, had been diversely used, and since Dar-Benn had the sense of breathing, she did with the flautists and vocalists so that breathing became her part of her sound.

The film's main theme, "Higher. Further. Faster. Together.", premiered at the Last Night of the BBC Proms on September 9, 2023, and was released on November 2. Karpman described it as the "chosen family theme" as it revolved around the three characters, saying "It's this feeling that you make your family, but it's not necessarily what you expect. I think that was another important thematic thrust ... as they come together and create this epic camaraderie". She used a solo viola to provide a mournful and warm sound, but the cue then builds with chanting and singing, and later 12 French horns were used to provide a superhero theme. In the end, the title theme has been sung in Latin, as instructed by her niece, who was also a poet.

== Track listing ==
All music is composed by Laura Karpman.

The Marvels (Original Motion Picture Soundtrack)
No.	Title	Length
1.	"Higher. Further. Faster. Together."	3:51
2.	"Dar-Benn"	3:01
3.	"Tear in Spacetime"	1:32
4.	"Surge"	2:19
5.	"Stop Spinning"	1:21
6.	"Arrival on Tarnax"	1:32
7.	"Peace Negotiations"	2:42
8.	"Entangled"	1:48
9.	"Reunion"	1:40
10.	"Free Fall"	1:45
11.	"Evacuation"	7:31
12.	"Connected"	2:09
13.	"Hala"	2:06
14.	"Arrival on Aladna"	1:30
15.	"Voices of Aladna"	6:37
16.	"War Preparations"	1:13
17.	"Forces Arrive"	3:48
18.	"Power"	3:05
19.	"O Captain! My Captain!"	2:33
20.	"Chosen Family"	1:51
21.	"On Fire"	2:50
22.	"Final Fight"	1:06
23.	"Dar-Benn's Destiny"	2:47
24.	"Greater Purpose"	5:29
25.	"Restoration"	2:20
26.	"Captain Rambeau"	2:08
27.	"Home"	2:20
28.	"The Marvels"	2:47
Total length:		1:15:00

== Reception ==
Zanobard Reviews assigned an 8/10 to the album, summarising that "Laura Karpman's The Marvels is a superhero score done right, weaving a stunningly-crafted new main theme with thunderous orchestra and exquisite vocals through eighty minutes of spectactular musical story-telling. It is a shame that Pinar Toprak's Captain Marvel theme doesn't return though." Music critic Jonathan Broxton said "The Marvels is a triumph of a superhero score, one of the best of its type this year, and should put the final nail in the coffin of the notion that women composers can't write large-scale, exciting, super-hero action music – Karpman blows that tired opinion completely into space." A review from Filmtracks stated that "Karpman succeeds in providing a highly intelligent and accomplished score filled with sonic intrigue, but not necessarily one at comfort with the concept or the general sound of the other scores in the Marvel Cinematic Universe. The lack of resolution in the new themes, minimal connectivity with prior themes, and frightfully frequent blasts of dissonance make this work one to appreciate intellectually more than casually. The solid narrative and resounding ambience compensate, but only to a point. Just because you can wow the listener with your smarts doesn't necessarily mean you should in each instance, and that balance will be the challenge for every listener to this score."

== Accolades ==
Award	Date	Category	Recipient	Result	Ref.
Hollywood Music in Media Awards	November 15, 2023	Original Score – Sci-Fi/Fantasy Film	Laura Karpman	Won	

== Additional music ==
French Electronic/Downtempo artist Thaehan, alongside Lo-Fi Girl, created a lo-fi remix of Laura Karpman's track "Higher. Further. Faster. Together.", which was released online exclusively, on the same day of the film's overseas premiere and official soundtrack release, through MarvelMusicVEVO's YouTube channel.

Additional music actually featured in the film includes:

- "Double Bubble Trouble" by M.I.A. (2013)
- "Ratata" by Skrillex, Missy Elliott, and Mr. Oizo (2023)
- "Intergalactic" by Beastie Boys (1998)
- "Welcome Home" by James Murphy, Nico Muhly, and Laura Karpman (2023)
- "Duet" by James Murphy, Nico Muhly, and Laura Karpman (2023)
- "Memory" by Barbra Streisand (1981)

Additionally, John Ottman's themes from his scores from 20th Century Fox's X-Men films X2 (2003) and X-Men: Days of Future Past (2014) are featured in the film.
