= Doctor Strange in the Multiverse of Madness (soundtrack) =

Doctor Strange in the Multiverse of Madness (Original Motion Picture Soundtrack)

Film score by Danny Elfman
- Released: May 4, 2022
- Studio: Abbey Road Studios
- Genre: Film score
- Length: 79:26
- Labels: Hollywood; Marvel Music

Danny Elfman chronology
The Woman in the Window (2021)	Doctor Strange in the Multiverse of Madness (Original Motion Picture Soundtrack) (2022)	Wednesday (2023)

Doctor Strange in the Multiverse of Madness (Original Motion Picture Soundtrack) is the film score to the Marvel Studios film Doctor Strange in the Multiverse of Madness composed by Danny Elfman. The soundtrack album was released by Hollywood Records on May 4, 2022.

== Background ==
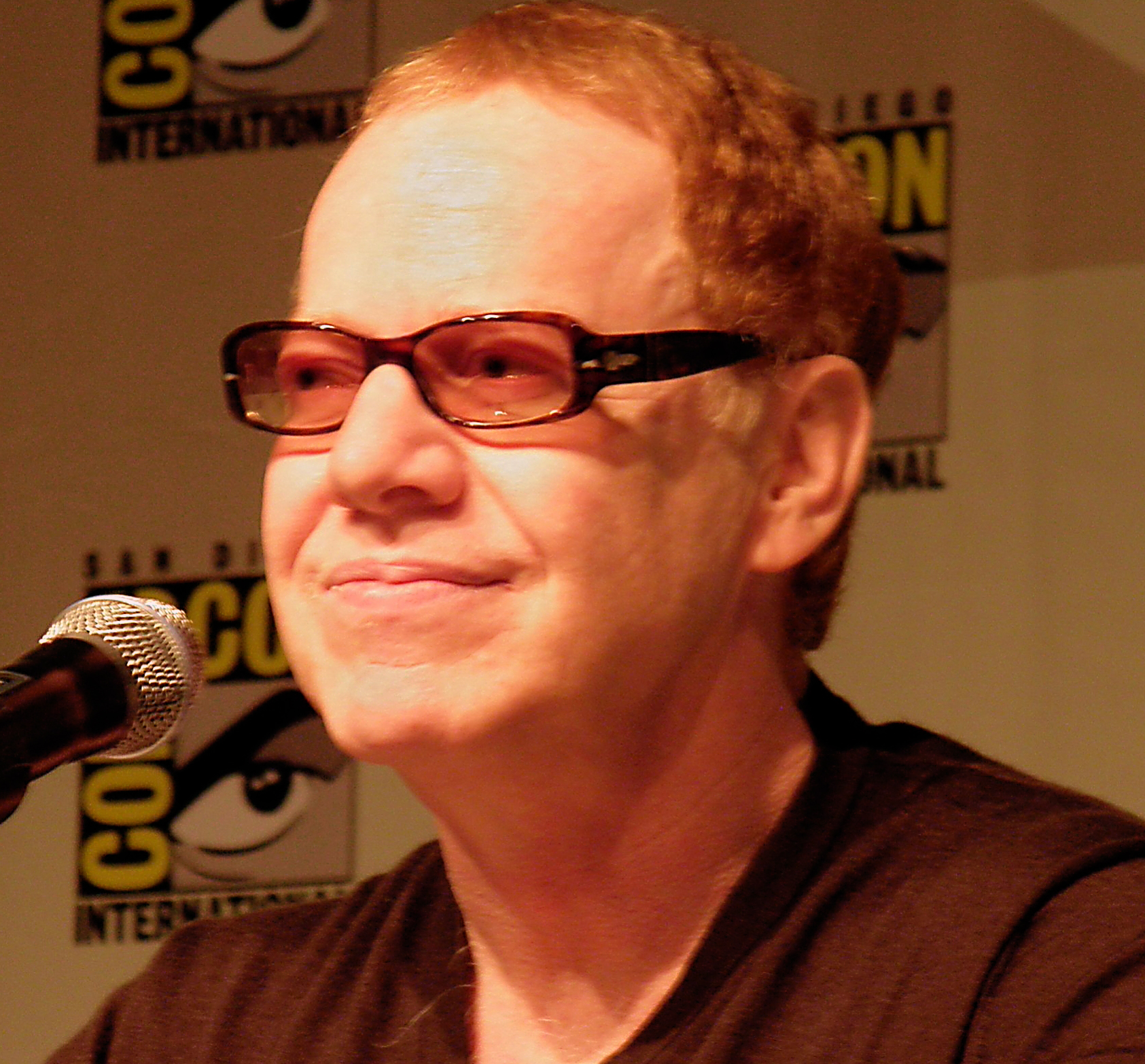
Composer Danny Elfman replaced Michael Giacchino, who left due to the scheduling conflicts with Spider-Man: No Way Home.

Doctor Strange (2016) composer Michael Giacchino was set to return for Multiverse of Madness by October 2019, when Scott Derrickson was set as director. After Sam Raimi took over as director, Danny Elfman was hired as composer; Elfman previously worked with Raimi on Darkman (1990), A Simple Plan (1998), Spider-Man (2002), Spider-Man 2 (2004), and Oz the Great and Powerful (2013). Elfman said he would refer to Giacchino's Doctor Strange theme in a similar way to how he used Alan Silvestri's theme from The Avengers (2012) when working on Avengers: Age of Ultron (2015). By February 2021, Elfman had begun working on music to be used during filming, but would not begin work on the actual score for the sequel for several months. In January 2022, Elfman revealed that he was working on completing the score, which included conducting an orchestra at Abbey Road Studios in London, with his frequent collaborator Steve Bartek remotely over Zoom.

The soundtrack album was released on May 4. On May 20, three previously unreleased tracks were released as part of an extended edition of the soundtrack.

== Track listing ==
All music composed by Danny Elfman, unless otherwise noted.

No.	Title	Length
1.	"Multiverse of Madness"	2:37
2.	"On the Run" ( (Note: This track references Michael Giacchino's theme from Doctor Strange.))	2:17
3.	"Strange Awakens"	0:47
4.	"The Apple Orchard"	3:18
5.	"Are You Happy"	1:08
6.	"Gargantos"	2:50
7.	"Journey with Wong"	1:44
8.	"Home?"	4:08
9.	"Strange Statue"	1:43
10.	"The Decision Is Made"	1:14
11.	"A Cup of Tea"	3:58
12.	"Discovering America"	0:47
13.	"Grab My Hand"	1:14
14.	"Battle Time"	3:11
15.	"Not a Monster"	2:38
16.	"Forbidden Ground"	2:29
17.	"Tribunal"	2:13
18.	"They're Not Coming Back"	1:00
19.	"Stranger Things Will Happen"	2:56
20.	"Buying Time"	3:39
21.	"Book of Vishanti"	2:45
22.	"Looking for Strange"	1:38
23.	"Strange Talk"	3:32
24.	"Lethal Symphonies"	1:48
25.	"Getting Through"	5:34
26.	"Only Way"	2:51
27.	"Trust Your Power"	2:54
28.	"They'll Be Loved"	3:59
29.	"Farewell"	2:29
30.	"An Interesting Question"	3:13
31.	"Main Titles"	2:36
32.	"An Unexpected Visitor"	0:32
Total length:		79:26

Extended edition
No.	Title	Length
1.	"Multiverse of Madness"	2:37
2.	"On the Run"	2:17
3.	"Strange Awakens"	0:47
4.	"The Apple Orchard"	3:18
5.	"Are You Happy"	1:08
6.	"Gargantos"	2:50
7.	"Journey with Wong"	1:44
8.	"Home?"	4:08
9.	"Strange Statue"	1:43
10.	"The Decision Is Made"	1:14
11.	"A Cup of Tea"	3:58
12.	"Discovering America"	0:47
13.	"Grab My Hand"	1:14
14.	"Battle Time"	3:11
15.	"Not a Monster"	2:38
16.	"Forbidden Ground"	2:29
17.	"Tribunal"	2:13
18.	"Illuminati vs. Wanda" ( (Note: This track references "Captain America March" from Captain America: The First Avenger by Alan Silvestri.))	2:47
19.	"They're Not Coming Back"	1:00
20.	"Stranger Things Will Happen"	2:56
21.	"Buying Time"	3:39
22.	"Book of Vishanti"	2:45
23.	"Looking for Strange"	1:38
24.	"Strange Talk"	3:32
25.	"Lethal Symphonies"	1:48
26.	"Getting Through"	5:34
27.	"Only Way"	2:51
28.	"Trust Your Power"	2:54
29.	"They'll Be Loved"	3:59
30.	"Farewell"	2:29
31.	"An Interesting Question"	3:13
32.	"Main Titles"	2:36
33.	"An Unexpected Visitor"	0:32
34.	"Illuminati" ( (Note: This track references the X-Men: The Animated Series theme by Haim Saban, Shuki Levy and Ron Wasserman.))	2:13
35.	"Wanda at Home" ( (Note: This track references "WandaVision!" from WandaVision by Kristen Anderson-Lopez and Robert Lopez.))	1:06

== Additional music ==
The film features a "musical battle" sequence between Strange and his Darkhold-corrupted counterpart, heard in the track "Lethal Symphonies". The scene remixed portions of Ludwig van Beethoven's Symphony No. 5 in C minor and Johann Sebastian Bach's Toccata and Fugue in D minor, originally featuring additional pieces of classical music until Feige suggested that Elfman pit Beethoven against Bach. Raimi worked with storyboard artist Doug Lefler and What If...? director Bryan Andrews in developing the sequence, which was completed entirely during the film's reshoots.

Julian Hilliard and Jett Klyne perform an original song entitled "The Ice Cream Song", which was conceived and written by Elfman, with lyrics by Waldron. In addition to Giacchino's Doctor Strange theme, the score also features the theme songs from the Marvel Cinematic Universe series WandaVision (2021) written by Robert Lopez and Kristen Anderson-Lopez, and the 1990s X-Men animated series, as well as Silvestri's "Captain America March" from Captain America: The First Avenger (2011).
