= Ant-Man and the Wasp (soundtrack) =

Ant-Man and the Wasp (Original Motion Picture Soundtrack)

Film score by Christophe Beck
- Released: July 6, 2018 (digital)
- Genre: Film score
- Length: 56:13
- Labels: Hollywood; Marvel Music

Christophe Beck chronology
Anon (2018)	Ant-Man and the Wasp (Original Motion Picture Soundtrack) (2018)	Frozen 2 (2019)

Ant-Man and the Wasp (Original Motion Picture Soundtrack) is the film score for the Marvel Studios film Ant-Man and the Wasp. The score was composed by Christophe Beck. Hollywood Records released the album digitally on July 6, 2018.

== Background ==
In June 2017, Ant-Man and the Wasp director Peyton Reed confirmed that Christophe Beck, who composed the score for Ant-Man, would return for Ant-Man and the Wasp. Beck reprised his main theme from Ant-Man, and also wrote a new one for Hope van Dyne / Wasp that he wanted to be "high energy" and show that she is more certain of her abilities than Scott Lang / Ant-Man. When choosing between these themes for specific scenes throughout the film, Beck tried to choose the Wasp theme more often so there would be "enough newness in the score to feel like it's going new places, and isn't just some retread." Hollywood Records and Marvel Music released the soundtrack album digitally on July 6, 2018.

In April 2019, Mondo released a vinyl album (2XLP), featuring 14 previously unreleased bonus tracks. This album is to be the first of several Marvel soundtracks released on vinyl in limited numbers. Ant-Man and the Wasp's score, for example, only released 1,000 copies with original artwork and options on vinyl record album coloring.

== Track listing ==
All music composed by Christophe Beck.

No.	Title	Length
1.	"It Ain't Over Till the Wasp Lady Stings"	2:34
2.	"Prologue"	3:42
3.	"Ghost in the Machine"	1:15
4.	"World's Greatest Grandma"	1:34
5.	"A Little Nudge"	3:49
6.	"Feds"	2:47
7.	"Ava's Story"	4:36
8.	"Wings & Blasters"	1:55
9.	"Utmost Ghost"	2:28
10.	"Tracker Swarm"	1:27
11.	"Cautious as a Hurricane"	2:47
12.	"Misdirection"	2:38
13.	"Quantum Leap"	2:53
14.	"I Shrink, Therefore I Am"	1:57
15.	"Partners"	1:52
16.	"Windshield Wipeout"	1:37
17.	"Hot Wheels"	1:38
18.	"Revivification"	2:50
19.	"A Flock of Seagulls"	1:07
20.	"San Francisco Giant"	0:45
21.	"Ghost = Toast"	2:54
22.	"Reduce Yourself"	1:41
23.	"Quit Screwing Around"	0:46
24.	"Arthropodie"	4:16
25.	"Baba Yaga Lullaby" (featuring David Dastmalchian)	0:25
Total length:		56:13

=== Vinyl track listings ===
==== Disc 1, Side A ====
1. It Ain't Over till the Wasp Lady Stings
2. Prologue
3. Ghost in the Machine
4. World's Greatest Grandma
5. A Little Nudge
6. Feds
7. Ava's Story

===== Disc 1, Side B =====
1. Wings & Blasters
2. Utmost Ghost
3. Tracker Swarm
4. Cautious as a Hurricane
5. Misdirection
6. Quantum Leap
7. I Shrink, Therefore I Am
8. Partners
9. Windshield Wipeout

===== Disc 2, Side A =====
1. Hot Wheels
2. Revivification
3. A Flock of Seagulls
4. San Francisco Giant
5. Ghost = Toast
6. Reduce Yourself
7. Quit Screwing Around
8. Arthropodie
9. Baba Yaga Lullaby (Performed by David Dastmalchian)

===== Disc 2, Side B =====
1. Anthill
2. Let's Fly, Antoinette!
3. The Lab
4. Mission Pympossible
5. Anterrogation
6. Shrinking and Phasing
7. This Old House
8. Let's Blow This Pez Stand
9. Quantum Dash
10. Pigeons! Ahhh (Demo)
11. Origins (Demo)
12. Buenos Aires, 1987 (Demo)
13. Tunnel Go Boom! (Demo)
14. Elementary School

== Additional music ==
One additional song, "Come On Get Happy" by The Partridge Family, is featured in the film, but was not included on the soundtrack album. Two songs found in the film, "Everyday Is Like Sunday" by Morrissey, and "Spooky" by Dusty Springfield, were not included on the soundtrack album.

The vinyl release of the soundtrack listed above features some 14 additional tracks not previously released with the main score. They can be found on Disc 2, Side B.
