= Eternals (soundtrack) =

Eternals (Original Motion Picture Soundtrack)

Film score by Ramin Djawadi
- Released: November 3, 2021
- Genre: Film score
- Length: 68:17
- Labels: Hollywood; Marvel Music

Ramin Djawadi chronology
Reminiscence (2021)	Eternals (Original Motion Picture Soundtrack) (2021)	Uncharted (2022)

Eternals (Original Motion Picture Soundtrack) is the film score for the 2021 Marvel Studios film Eternals. The score was composed by Ramin Djawadi, with the soundtrack album being released by Hollywood Records on November 3, 2021.

== Background ==
Ramin Djawadi composed the score for the film, after previously doing so for Marvel Studios' Iron Man (2008). Two tracks from the film's soundtrack, "Across the Oceans of Time" and "Eternals Theme", were released as singles on October 22, 2021, while the full album was released on November 3. The final track is performed by Celina Sharma.

Additionally, "Time" by Pink Floyd plays at the Marvel Studios' vanity plate leading into the first scene in present time, "Sugarfoot" by Black Joe Lewis & the Honeybears plays during Dane's birthday party, "The End of the World" by Skeeter Davis plays at the scene at Phastos' home where he is tucking his son to bed, and "Feels Like the First Time" by Foreigner plays during the credits following the mid-credits scene.

== Track listing ==
All music composed by Ramin Djawadi, except where otherwise noted.

Eternals (Original Motion Picture Soundtrack)
No.	Title	Length
1.	"Eternals Theme"	3:47
2.	"It is Time"	2:17
3.	"Mission"	4:30
4.	"Somewhere in Time"	1:39
5.	"The Domo"	1:57
6.	"Joie De Vivre"	2:13
7.	"Celestials"	6:46
8.	"Life"	5:22
9.	"Not Worth Saving"	2:49
10.	"Remember"	5:32
11.	"Across the Oceans of Time"	3:50
12.	"This Is Your Fight Now"	2:46
13.	"Audience with Arishem"	5:33
14.	"Isn't It Beautiful"	2:38
15.	"I Have Been Waiting for This"	3:23
16.	"Emergence Sea"	2:22
17.	"Eternal Loss"	3:24
18.	"A Wish"	2:41
19.	"Earth is Just One Planet"	1:39
20.	"Nach Mera Hero" (performed by Celina Sharma)	3:09
Total length:		68:17
