= Captain America: Brave New World (soundtrack) =

Captain America: Brave New World (Original Motion Picture Soundtrack)

Film score by Laura Karpman
- Released: February 12, 2025 (digital)
- Genre: Film score
- Length: 72:07
- Labels: Hollywood; Marvel Music

Laura Karpman chronology
The Only Girl in the Orchestra (2023)	Captain America: Brave New World (Original Motion Picture Soundtrack) (2025)

Captain America: Brave New World (Original Motion Picture Soundtrack) is the film score for the Marvel Studios film Captain America: Brave New World. The score was composed by Laura Karpman. Hollywood Records released the album digitally on February 12, 2025.

== Background ==
Laura Karpman was announced as the composer for the film in August 2024. Karpman previously composed the music for the MCU series What If...? (2021–2024) and Ms. Marvel (2022), and the film The Marvels (2023). The soundtrack album was released digitally by Hollywood Records and Marvel Music on February 12, 2025.

== Track listing ==
All music composed by Laura Karpman.

Captain America: Brave New World (Original Motion Picture Soundtrack)
No.	Title	Length
1.	"Captain America: Brave New World Main Title"	3:44
2.	"Brave New World"	2:50
3.	"President Ross"	1:46
4.	"Courtyard"	0:43
5.	"Hostages Saved"	2:18
6.	"Aftermath"	2:35
7.	"Discovery of the Millennium"	2:44
8.	"White House Confusion"	3:03
9.	"Mystery Unfolds"	1:39
10.	"Sidewinder"	1:30
11.	"Junkyard"	1:53
12.	"No Phones"	2:06
13.	"Camp Echo One"	1:57
14.	"Samuel Sterns"	4:38
15.	"Camp Echo One Fight"	1:14
16.	"Corridor Fight"	0:57
17.	"Make the Call"	1:37
18.	"The Island"	2:09
19.	"Heart Talk"	3:27
20.	"Birds in the Air"	1:45
21.	"Fire"	2:06
22.	"One Down"	0:56
23.	"Still Chasing"	4:15
24.	"Fleet Saved"	0:57
25.	"Aspire"	2:22
26.	"All Is Not Well"	1:40
27.	"Betty and Ross"	1:42
28.	"Confrontation"	2:48
29.	"Transformation"	3:24
30.	"Lure"	3:47
31.	"Prove It"	2:49
32.	"That's Three"	1:24
33.	"Another Visitor"	2:46
34.	"Sam and Joaquin"	2:46
35.	"Conspiracy Theme"	2:53
Total length:		72:07
