= Guardians of the Galaxy Vol. 3 (soundtrack) =

2023 soundtrack album

Guardians of the Galaxy Vol. 3: Awesome Mix Vol. 3 (Original Motion Picture Soundtrack) is the soundtrack album for the Marvel Studios film Guardians of the Galaxy Vol. 3. Featuring the songs present on Peter Quill's Zune in the film, the album was released by Hollywood Records on May 3, 2023. A separate film score album, Guardians of the Galaxy Vol. 3 (Original Score), composed by John Murphy, was also released by Hollywood Records on the same date.

== Background ==
In October 2021, James Gunn confirmed that Tyler Bates, the composer of Guardians of the Galaxy (2014) and Guardians of the Galaxy Vol. 2 (2017), would not be returning to compose the film's score and that he would be replaced by John Murphy, after composing the soundtrack for the film The Suicide Squad (2021) and the television special The Guardians of the Galaxy Holiday Special (2022), both also directed by Gunn. Despite having a different composer, some of the themes that were previously written by Bates in the previous films were referenced for the score. While Gunn was filming, Murphy revealed that he already wrote some tracks for his score and ready to be played during the production of the film.

In April 2017, Gunn considered that the music for the film would be different from the songs that were used for the first two films' soundtracks, Awesome Mix Vol. 1 and Vol. 2. The following month, he added that he was "panicking" about the soundtrack and had to make some "pretty specific choices" shortly due to the wider range of available music for the story. By early July 2017, Gunn had narrowed down his choices for potential songs to 181, but noted that this list could grow again. All of the songs for the film had been selected by the following month; the songs are not modern and come from Quill's Zune that he received at the end of Vol. 2, although Gunn added that the soundtrack was not limited to 1970s pop songs compared to the first two films, instead spanning multiple decades. Gunn was unable to use a song he wanted for Vol. 3 due to a legal battle over its ownership. He later revealed that the song in question was "Russian Roulette" by the Lords of the New Church. The film opens with an acoustic version of "Creep" by Radiohead, which provided "a much different tone from the beginning than the other two films". Gunn stated that his second choice for the opening sequence was "Wish You Were Here" by Pink Floyd.

== Guardians of the Galaxy Vol. 3: Awesome Mix Vol. 3 (Original Motion Picture Soundtrack) ==
Guardians of the Galaxy: Awesome Mix Vol. 3 (Original Motion Picture Soundtrack)

Soundtrack album by various artists
- Released: May 3, 2023
- Length: 65:13
- Labels: Hollywood; Marvel Music
- Producer: various

=== Track listing ===
No.	Title	Writer(s)	Artist(s)	Length
1.	"Creep" (Acoustic Version)	Radiohead; Albert Hammond; Mike Hazlewood	Radiohead	4:19
2.	"Crazy on You"	Ann Wilson; Nancy Wilson	Heart	4:53
3.	"Since You Been Gone"	Russ Ballard	Rainbow	3:17
4.	"In the Meantime"	Royston Langdon	Spacehog	5:00
5.	"Reasons"	Philip Bailey; Charles Stepney; Maurice White	Earth, Wind & Fire	4:59
6.	"Do You Realize??"	Wayne Coyne; Steven Drozd; Michael Ivins; Dave Fridmann	The Flaming Lips	3:33
7.	"We Care a Lot"	Charles Mosley; Rodney Christopher Bottum	Faith No More	4:04
8.	"Koinu no Carnival" (From "Minute Waltz")	Frédéric Chopin	EHAMIC	3:10
9.	"I'm Always Chasing Rainbows"	Harry Carroll (music); Joseph McCarthy (lyrics)	Alice Cooper	2:08
10.	"San Francisco"	Michael Vincze, Colin Dieden	The Mowgli's	2:53
11.	"Poor Girl"	John Doe; Exene Cervenka	X	2:54
12.	"This Is the Day"	Matt Johnson	The The	4:57
13.	"No Sleep till Brooklyn"	Rick Rubin; Michael Diamond; Adam Horovitz; Adam Yauch	Beastie Boys	4:07
14.	"Dog Days Are Over"	Florence Welch; Isabella Summers	Florence and the Machine	4:12
15.	"Badlands"	Bruce Springsteen	Bruce Springsteen	4:02
16.	"I Will Dare"	Paul Westerberg	The Replacements	3:17
17.	"Come and Get Your Love"	Lolly Vegas	Redbone	5:00
Total length:				65:13

All the songs included on the soundtrack are featured in the film. Gunn also revealed that he intended to use the song "Russian Roulette" by the Lords of the New Church for Vol. 3, but he was unable to include it because the song was in a legal battle over who owned it. Years later while on The Peacemaker Podcast Gunn revealed what song replaced "Russian Roulette" that being "This Is the Day" by The The.

=== Charts ===
==== Weekly charts ====
Weekly chart performance for Guardians of the Galaxy Vol. 3: Awesome Mix Vol. 3 (Original Motion Picture Soundtrack)
Chart (2023)	Peak position
Australian Albums (ARIA)	9
Austrian Albums (Ö3 Austria)	9
Belgian Albums (Ultratop Flanders)	51
Belgian Albums (Ultratop Wallonia)	17
French Albums (SNEP)	5
German Albums (Offizielle Top 100)	9
Japanese Albums (Oricon)	22
Japanese Digital Albums (Oricon)	3
Japanese Hot Albums (Billboard Japan)	10
New Zealand Albums (RMNZ)	14
Polish Albums (ZPAV)	46
Swiss Albums (Schweizer Hitparade)	7
United Kingdom Compilation Chart	1
US Billboard 200	15
US Soundtrack Albums (Billboard)	1

==== Year-end charts ====
Year-end chart performance for Guardians of the Galaxy Vol. 3: Awesome Mix Vol. 3 (Original Motion Picture Soundtrack)
Chart	Year	Position
French Albums (SNEP)	2023	96
US Soundtrack Albums (Billboard)	2023	21
French Albums (SNEP)	2024	128
French Albums (SNEP)	2025	146

== Certifications ==
Certifications for Guardians of the Galaxy Vol. 3: Awesome Mix Vol. 3 (Original Motion Picture Soundtrack)
Region	Certification	Certified units/sales
France (SNEP)	Platinum	100,000^{‡}
^{‡} Sales+streaming figures based on certification alone.

== Guardians of the Galaxy Vol. 3 (Original Score) ==
Guardians of the Galaxy Vol. 3 (Original Score)

Film score by John Murphy
- Released: May 3, 2023
- Studio: Abbey Road
- Genre: Film score
- Length: 63:02
- Labels: Hollywood; Marvel Music

John Murphy chronology
The Guardians of the Galaxy Holiday Special (2022)	Guardians of the Galaxy Vol. 3 (Original Score) (2023)	Superman (2025)

=== Track listing ===
All music composed by John Murphy.

No.	Title	Length
1.	"Kits"	1:36
2.	"Warlock vs. Guardians"	3:47
3.	"That Hurts"	1:36
4.	"Batch 89"	1:47
5.	"Orgoscope"	1:43
6.	"Mo Ergaste Forn"	2:31
7.	"Orgoscope Elevator"	1:26
8.	"Naming"	2:25
9.	"Dido's Lament"	3:57
10.	"Hooray Time Forever!"	2:22
11.	"It Really Is Good to Have Friends"	2:27
12.	"Exploding Planet"	1:23
13.	"Face Off"	2:39
14.	"Into the Light"	4:30
15.	"Guardians vs. Hell Spawn" (includes Guardians of the Galaxy theme by Tyler Bates)	3:38
16.	"Mantis and the Abelisk"	1:11
17.	"Use Your Heart Boy"	0:54
18.	"The High Evolutionary"	2:56
19.	"Domo! Domo!"	3:48
20.	"Who We Are"	2:21
21.	"Stampede"	1:54
22.	"Did That Look Cool?"	2:44
23.	"On the Spaceport"	1:47
24.	"I Love You Guys"	2:15
25.	"Mo Ergaste Forn (Full Version)"	3:23
26.	"All Life Has Meaning"	2:02
Total length:		63:02

==== Charts ====
Chart (2023)	Peak position
UK Official Soundtracks Album Chart	33
