= The Prestige (soundtrack) =

2006 soundtrack album by David Julyan

The Prestige (Original Motion Picture Soundtrack)

Film score by David Julyan
- Released: October 17, 2006
- Genre: Film score
- Length: 49:32
- Label: Hollywood Records

David Julyan chronology
The Last Drop (2006)	The Prestige (Original Motion Picture Soundtrack) (2006)	Outlaw (2007)

The Prestige (Original Motion Picture Soundtrack) is the soundtrack album to Christopher Nolan's 2006 film The Prestige. It was released on October 17, 2006. The soundtrack drew from the film score, composed and arranged by David Julyan.

== Composition ==
The film score was written by English musician and composer David Julyan. Julyan had previously collaborated with director Christopher Nolan on Following (1998), Memento (2000), and Insomnia (2002). Following the film's narrative, the soundtrack has three sections: the Pledge, the Turn, and the Prestige.

The song "Analyse" by Radiohead frontman Thom Yorke is played over the credits. "Returner" by Gackt was used as the theme song in the Japanese version.

== Critical reception ==
Some critics were disappointed with the score, acknowledging that while it worked within the context of the film, it was not enjoyable by itself. Jonathan Jarry of SoundtrackNet described the score as "merely functional," establishing the atmosphere of dread but never taking over. Although the reviewer was interested in the score's notion, Jarry found the execution was "extremely disappointing."

Christopher Coleman of Tracksounds felt that though it was "...a perfectly fitting score," it was completely overwhelmed by the film, and totally unnoticed at times. Christian Clemmensen of Filmtracks recommended the soundtrack for those who enjoyed Julyan's work on the film, and noted that it was not for those who expected "any semblance of intellect or enchantment in the score to match the story of the film." Clemmensen called the score lifeless, "constructed on a bed of simplistic string chords and dull electronic soundscapes."

== Track listing ==
All music is composed by David Julyan.

No.	Title	Length
1.	"Are You Watching Closely?"	1:51
2.	"Colorado Springs"	4:15
3.	"The Light Field"	1:50
4.	"Borden Meets Sarah"	2:11
5.	"Adagio for Julia"	2:03
6.	"A New Trick"	4:29
7.	"The Journal"	2:55
8.	"The Transported Man"	2:36
9.	"No, Not Today"	2:31
10.	"Caught"	1:39
11.	"Cutter Returns"	2:13
12.	"The Real Transported Man"	2:28
13.	"Man's Reach Exceeds His Imagination"	2:08
14.	"Goodbye to Jess"	2:53
15.	"Sacrifice"	5:15
16.	"The Price of a Good Trick"	5:05
17.	"The Prestige"	1:40
18.	"The Tesla"	1:30
Total length:		49:32
