= Behemoth! (soundtrack) =

2026 film soundtrack album

Behemoth! (Original Motion Picture Soundtrack)

Film score by The Behemoth! Collective
- Released: November 6, 2026
- Recorded: 2026
- Genre: Film score
- Length: 46:57
- Label: Hollywood
- Producers: The Behemoth! Collective; Tony Gilroy

Behemoth! (Original Motion Picture Soundtrack) is the film score to the 2026 film Behemoth! directed by Tony Gilroy. The album features the original score composed by The Behemoth! Collective—which consists of composers James Newton Howard, Alan Silvestri, Brandon Roberts, Michael Abels, Emily Bear, Lukas Frank, Michael Giacchino, Henry Jackman and Nami Melumad. It also features the original songs "Your God Is Sleeping" by Lukas Frank and "Make Mine Salty" by Haley Reinhart. The album was released through Hollywood Records on November 6, 2026.

== Background ==
Behemoth! revolves around the story of a renowned high-profile cellist-cum-session musician Alex (Pedro Pascal), who returns to Los Angeles to perform film scores. Music served as an important storytelling device for this film. As an experimental approach, Gilroy, instead of relying on a single composer had assembled on nine composers, demanding distinctive scores for each film Alex worked on. Regarding this approach, Gilroy recalled on his ambitions as a musician before being a writer-director, and this resulted in him developing the idea of Behemoth! based on his experience entering the John Williams Scoring Stage at the Sony Pictures Studios for the first time, and wanted this to be a "love letter to movie music". Since he did not want a single composer to be involved in the fictional films, Gilroy selected the nine composers like the casting of actors. Gilroy developed backstories for all the shows, and tell all the composers what the plots of their show were.

In January 2026, it was announced that James Newton Howard and Alan Silvestri will be some of the composers involved in the project; the former of whom had worked with Gilroy in Michael Clayton (2007), Duplicity (2009) and The Bourne Legacy (2012). The following month, Gilroy stated in an interview that Brandon Roberts, who previously worked with Gilroy on the second season of Andor, would also work on the film as one of the composers. By July 2026, Michael Abels, Emily Bear, Lukas Frank, Michael Giacchino, Henry Jackman and Nami Melumad, were revealed as the rest of the composers, forming The Behemoth! Collective.

All of the music had to be completed prior to filming so that that could be used in production and Pascal would learn about the pieces played onscreen. All these composers received the same remuneration and equal billing, having much little money than usual pay. Over 303 musicians had been enlisted for recording and performing the score.

== Composition ==
Abels composed the musical piece "Cello Étude Suite" for Alex's cello practice sessions, including a transition from a warm-up exercise into Bach's Cello Prelude No. 1 performed by Alex as a six-year-old prodigy during a flashback. Bear wrote the love theme for the fictional film Season of Glass, drawing inspiration from 1960s French and Italian film scores through lush orchestration, jazz-influenced harmonies and strings. She also composed a slow, intimate waltz for a scene in which a young widow teaches a boy to dance, and co-wrote the film's end-credit song with Gilroy, "Make Mine Salty" performed by Haley Reinhart. Lukas Frank composed the original song "Your God Is Sleeping" and the "Serian Suite", an overarching musical theme associated with Alex's character, featuring prepared piano, droning string sounds and orchestral elements.

Giacchino wrote a traditional orchestral cartoon score for Happy & Slappy, inspired by 1960s animated productions such as Tom and Jerry. Jackman composed the "Jason Bourne-ish theme" for the fictional spy film Spies Don't Run, combining orchestral arrangements, abstract vocals, heavy percussion and Middle Eastern influences. Melumad contributed a delicate harp-led cue for the period film Tolerance Hill, using the instrument to evoke warmth, nostalgia and sadness as Alex revisits his childhood home. Roberts composed the jazz-inspired television theme Look Away Jones, depicting a fictional series about a former football star turned detective. He further drew inspiration from the work of Quincy Jones, and collaborate with jazz flautist Katisse Buckingham and Tim Loo, who was responsible for assembling the musicians.

Howard composed the film's emotional finale, centered on a solo piano theme expressing the sadness of the concluding events, which was also developed into piano-and-cello duets and orchestral variations. Alan Silvestri contributed the music for the scoring session of Open World, a fictional Hollywood blockbuster that serves as a decoy title for Behemoth. Described as a high-stakes adventure and caper sequence, the cue features a large orchestral arrangement that plays the fictional heist action dramatically and seriously despite its humorous context.

== Release ==
The soundtrack was released digitally through Hollywood Records on November 6, 2026, nearly a month prior to the film's release. It is also scheduled to be released through physical vinyl LP formats on December 4, 2026.

== Reception ==
Regarding the music, Pete Hammond of Deadline Hollywood praised the ensemble's contribution on their music, and appreciated it as "hands down the year's best"; he also praised the song "Your God Is Sleeping" for the fictional film hoping it to be a "major hit". Owen Gleiberman of Variety also appreciated their efforts but felt that the same trick could have been executed with a single composer. Brian Tallerico of RogerEbert.com also said, "Working with [an] insanely talented group of composers known as The Behemoth! Collective, Gilroy allows Alex's recording sessions for the film-within-a-film to become the soundtrack for his own".

Belen Edwards of Mashable India praised the music to be "exceptional" and an "astonishing group, [...] each turn in gorgeous work" where it helps in becoming "a true love letter to film scoring and the people who bring these pieces of music to life." David Ehrlich of IndieWire wrote "the verisimilitude of the Behemoth! Collective is beyond reproach, as the fake scores invariably echo with the essence of real ones". Aidan Kelley of Collider wrote "One could argue that having nine total composers is a bit overkill, but in a movie that is essentially a love letter to how the music for all your favorite movies is made, having such a diverse array of sounds on hand really helps flesh out Alex's world."

Nikki Baughan of Screen International considered the ensemble's efforts to create individual music pieces to be "deeply rewarding" and "work[s] in harmony to become the chameleonic soundtrack to Alex's life." James Mottram of Radio Times wrote "With a wealth of fabulous music in the film provided by multiple composers – listed in the credits as the 'Behemoth! Collective' – there's an authenticity to the film, with scenes shot in Hollywood recording auditoriums that really place you in that world."

== Track listing ==
No.	Title	Artist(s)	Length
1.	"Serian Suite"	Lukas Frank	2:13
2.	"Spies Don't Run – Duende!"	Henry Jackman	0:47
3.	"Spies Don't Run – Spies Don't Run"	Jackman	3:50
4.	"Spies Don't Run – Spies Don't Cry"	Jackman	3:00
5.	"Season of Glass – Love Theme"	Emily Bear	0:51
6.	"Season of Glass – Dallas Waltz"	Bear	1:52
7.	"Look Away Jones – Main Title"	Brandon Roberts	2:40
8.	"Hap and Slappy – Munch and Judy"	Michael Giacchino	0:57
9.	"Tolerance Hill – Winter Candles"	Nami Melumad	3:12
10.	"Tolerance Hill – Ashes"	Melumad	1:01
11.	"Nadia's Requiem"	James Newton Howard; Tony Gilroy	2:21
12.	"Cello Étude Suite"	Michael Abels	3:37
13.	"Behemoth! – Cosmic Break-In"	Alan Silvestri	3:49
14.	"Behemoth! – Toothbrush Run"	Silvestri	2:33
15.	"Your God Is Sleeping"	Frank; Storefront Church	5:39
16.	"Viv's Behemoth!"	Howard	1:50
17.	"Duet"	Howard	2:05
18.	"Adios Amigos"	Howard	1:56
19.	"Make Mine Salty"	Haley Reinhart	2:35
Total length:			46:57

== Release history ==
Region	Date	Format(s)	Label(s)	Ref.
Various	November 6, 2026	Digital download; streaming	Hollywood Records	
Various	December 4, 2026	LP	Hollywood Records	

== Accolades ==
Behemoth! was intended to be a possible contender for Best Original Score at the 99th Academy Awards. Despite the Academy of Motion Picture Arts and Sciences (AMPAS) rules for shortlists stated that no more than three composers can be considered for this category—The Behemoth! Collective, however involves nine composers—executives at Searchlight hoped that the entry would be possible, with a single nominee under the collective, opining on the flexibility of KPop Demon Hunters winning accolades at the music branch, despite the involvement of multiple songwriters. Searchlight submitted "Your God Is Sleeping" for shortlisting in the Best Original Song category.

Award	Date of ceremony	Category	Nominee(s)	Result	Ref.
Hollywood Music in Media Awards	November 18, 2026	Best Original Score – Feature Film	The Behemoth! Collective	Pending	
Hollywood Music in Media Awards	November 18, 2026	Best Original Song – Feature Film	"Your God Is Sleeping" – Lukas Frank, Storefront Church	Pending	
