= Guardians of the Galaxy (soundtrack) =

2014 soundtrack albums

Guardians of the Galaxy: Awesome Mix Vol. 1 (Original Motion Picture Soundtrack) is the soundtrack album for the Marvel Studios film Guardians of the Galaxy. Featuring the songs present on Peter Quill's mixtape in the film, the album was released by Hollywood Records on July 29, 2014. A separate film score album, Guardians of the Galaxy (Original Score), composed by Tyler Bates, was also released by Hollywood Records on the same date, along with a deluxe version featuring both albums. The soundtrack album reached number one on the US Billboard 200 chart, becoming the first soundtrack album in history consisting entirely of previously released songs to top the chart.

The album topped the Billboard Top Soundtracks chart for 11 consecutive weeks and 16 weeks in total. By April 2017, it has sold over 1.75 million copies in the United States alone. As of January 2023, it has been certified 3× Platinum by the RIAA. The album was the US's second best-selling soundtrack album of 2014, behind Disney's Frozen.

== Background ==
In August 2013 the film's director, James Gunn, posted on his Facebook page that Tyler Bates would be composing the film's score. Gunn stated that Bates will write some of the score first so that he can film to the music, as opposed to scoring to the film. In February 2014, Gunn revealed that the film would incorporate songs from the 1960s and 1970s, such as "Hooked on a Feeling", on a mixtape in Quill's Walkman, which acts as a way for him to stay connected to the Earth, home, and family he lost. In May 2014, Gunn added that using the songs from the 60s and 70s were "cultural reference points", saying, "It's striking the balance throughout the whole movie, through something that is very unique, but also something that is easily accessible to people at the same time. The music and the Earth stuff is one of those touchstones that we have to remind us that, yeah, Quill is a real person from planet Earth who's just like you and me. Except that he's in this big outer space adventure."

== Guardians of the Galaxy: Awesome Mix Vol. 1 (Original Motion Picture Soundtrack) ==
Guardians of the Galaxy: Awesome Mix Vol. 1 (Original Motion Picture Soundtrack)

Soundtrack album by Various artists
- Released: July 29, 2014
- Length: 44:34
- Labels: Hollywood; Marvel Music
- Producer: various

Professional ratings
Review scores
Source	Rating
AllMusic	3/5 stars

=== Track listing ===
No.	Title	Writer(s)	Artist(s)	Length
1.	"Hooked on a Feeling"	Mark James	Blue Swede	2:52
2.	"Go All the Way"	Eric Carmen	Raspberries	3:21
3.	"Spirit in the Sky"	Norman Greenbaum	Norman Greenbaum	4:02
4.	"Moonage Daydream"	David Bowie	David Bowie	4:41
5.	"Fooled Around and Fell in Love"	Elvin Bishop	Elvin Bishop	4:35
6.	"I'm Not in Love"	Eric Stewart; Graham Gouldman	10cc	6:03
7.	"I Want You Back"	The Corporation	The Jackson 5	2:58
8.	"Come and Get Your Love"	Lolly Vegas	Redbone	3:26
9.	"Cherry Bomb"	Joan Jett; Kim Fowley	The Runaways	2:17
10.	"Escape (The Piña Colada Song)"	Rupert Holmes	Rupert Holmes	4:37
11.	"O-o-h Child"	Stan Vincent	Five Stairsteps	3:13
12.	"Ain't No Mountain High Enough"	Nickolas Ashford; Valerie Simpson	Marvin Gaye and Tammi Terrell	2:29
Total length:				44:34

All songs—with the exception of "Spirit in the Sky", which is played in the trailer—are featured in the film. "Never Been to Spain" by Three Dog Night, "Magic" by Pilot, and "Livin' Thing" by Electric Light Orchestra were also used during filming; however, the scenes in which they were featured were cut from the final version of the film. "Wichita Lineman" by Glen Campbell and "Mama Told Me (Not to Come)" by Three Dog Night were originally considered for the film instead of "Moonage Daydream". "Fox on the Run" by Sweet and "Surrender" by Cheap Trick were also considered for the film. Both would be used for Guardians of the Galaxy Vol. 2's Awesome Mix Vol. 2, with Fox on the Run only being played in the second trailer.

=== Charts and certifications ===
By August 2014, Guardians of the Galaxy: Awesome Mix Vol. 1 had reached the top of the Billboard 200 chart, becoming the first soundtrack album consisting entirely of previously released songs to top the chart. By September 2014, Guardians of the Galaxy: Awesome Mix Vol. 1 was the second best-selling soundtrack album in the US with 426,000 copies sold at that time. The album was also the second soundtrack album released by Disney Music Group that year to reach No. 1 on the aforementioned chart. The album was certified Gold by the Recording Industry Association of America, eight weeks after its release. An exclusive vinyl LP edition of the soundtrack was also released on September 16, 2014. The vinyl LP has been sold 367,000 units till December, 2019; making the LP 3rd best-selling vinyl album of the decade. On November 28, 2014, the soundtrack got a limited edition cassette tape release exclusive to retailers associated with Record Store Day's Black Friday event, and is the first cassette release by Disney Music Group since 2003's Classic Disney: 60 Years of Musical Magic. The soundtrack became the fifth best-selling album of 2014, selling a total of 898,000 copies that year. In January 2015, the album was certified platinum by the RIAA. It has sold 1.75 million total copies in the United States, with 11,000 coming from cassette sales. Worldwide, Guardians of the Galaxy: Awesome Mix Vol. 1 sold over 2.5 million copies in 2014. As of January 2023, it has been certified 3× Platinum by the RIAA.

==== Charts ====
Chart (2014)	Peak position
Australian Albums (ARIA)	2
Austrian Albums (Ö3 Austria)	5
Belgian Albums (Ultratop Flanders)	18
Belgian Albums (Ultratop Wallonia)	23
Canadian Albums (Billboard)	1
Danish Albums (Hitlisten)	5
Dutch Albums (Album Top 100)	27
French Albums (SNEP)	46
German Albums (Offizielle Top 100)	9
Hungarian Albums (MAHASZ)	11
Italian Compilation Albums Chart	2
New Zealand Albums (RMNZ)	7
Spanish Albums (Promusicae)	28
Swiss Albums (Schweizer Hitparade)	19
UK Compilation Albums Chart	2
UK Official Soundtracks Album Chart	1
US Billboard 200	1
US Top Rock Albums (Billboard)	1
US Soundtrack Albums (Billboard)	1

==== Certifications ====
Region	Certification	Certified units/sales
Australia (ARIA)	2× Platinum	140,000^{^}
Austria (IFPI Austria)	Platinum	15,000^{*}
Canada (Music Canada)	Diamond	800,000^{‡}
Germany (BVMI)	Platinum	200,000^{‡}
New Zealand (RMNZ)	Gold	7,500^{^}
United Kingdom (BPI)	2× Platinum	600,000^{‡}
United States (RIAA)	3× Platinum	3,000,000^{‡}
Summaries
Worldwide (IFPI) (2015 sales)	—	2,500,000
^{*} Sales figures based on certification alone.^{^} Shipments figures based on certification alone.^{‡} Sales+streaming figures based on certification alone.

==== Year-end charts ====
Chart (2014)	Position
Australian Albums (ARIA)	22
Belgian Albums (Ultratop Flanders)	171
Canadian Albums (Billboard)	26
US Billboard 200	19
US Top Rock Album (Billboard)s	4
US Soundtracks Albums (Billboard)	2
Worldwide (IFPI)	8
Chart (2015)	Position
Australian Albums (ARIA)	36
Austrian Albums (Ö3 Austria)	59
Canadian Albums (Billboard)	19
New Zealand Albums (RMNZ)	48
US Billboard 200	21
US Top Rock Albums (Billboard)	1
US Soundtracks Albums (Billboard)	2
Chart (2016)	Position
US Top Rock Albums (Billboard)	16
US Soundtracks Albums (Billboard)	4
Chart (2017)	Position
Australian Albums (ARIA)	18
Austrian Albums (Ö3 Austria)	37
US Top Stage & Screen Albums	8
US Billboard 200	125
US Top Rock Albums (Billboard)	14
US Soundtracks Albums (Billboard)	9
Chart (2018)	Position
Australian Albums (ARIA)	24
Austrian Albums (Ö3 Austria)	48
US Top Rock Albums (Billboard)	46
US Soundtracks Albums (Billboard)	10
Chart (2019)	Position
Australian Albums (ARIA)	56
Belgian Albums (Ultratop Flanders)	113
Belgian Albums (Ultratop Wallonia)	197
US Top Rock Albums (Billboard)	71
US Soundtracks Albums (Billboard)	11
Chart (2020)	Position
US Soundtrack Albums (Billboard)	11
Chart (2021)	Position
US Top Rock Albums (Billboard)	68
US Soundtrack Albums (Billboard)	7

==== Decade-end charts ====
Chart (2010–2019)	Position
Australian Albums (ARIA)	44
US Billboard 200	78
US Top Rock Albums (Billboard)	4

== Guardians of the Galaxy (Original Score) ==
Guardians of the Galaxy (Original Score)

Film score by Tyler Bates
- Released: July 29, 2014
- Studio: Abbey Road Studios
- Genre: Film score
- Length: 64:34
- Labels: Hollywood; Marvel Music

Tyler Bates chronology
Flight 7500 (2014)	Guardians of the Galaxy (Original Score) (2014)	John Wick (2014)

=== Track listing ===
All music composed by Tyler Bates.

No.	Title	Length
1.	"Morag"	1:58
2.	"The Final Battle Begins"	4:21
3.	"Plasma Ball"	1:18
4.	"Quill's Big Retreat"	1:38
5.	"To the Stars"	2:52
6.	"Ronan's Theme"	2:24
7.	"Everyone's an Idiot"	1:26
8.	"What a Bunch of A-Holes"	2:14
9.	"Busted"	1:34
10.	"The New Meat"	0:36
11.	"The Destroyer"	1:27
12.	"Sanctuary"	2:26
13.	"The Kyln Escape"	7:23
14.	"Don't Mess With My Walkman"	0:44
15.	"The Great Companion"	0:51
16.	"The Road to Knowhere"	0:37
17.	"The Collector"	3:20
18.	"Ronan's Arrival"	0:56
19.	"The Pod Chase"	3:56
20.	"Sacrifice"	3:20
21.	"We All Got Dead People"	1:46
22.	"The Ballad of the Nova Corps."	1:48
23.	"Groot Spores"	1:11
24.	"Guardians United"	2:46
25.	"The Big Blast"	3:05
26.	"Groot Cocoon"	2:29
27.	"Black Tears"	2:43
28.	"Citizens Unite"	1:15
29.	"A Nova Upgrade"	2:10
Total length:		64:34

=== Charts ===
Chart (2014)	Peak position
UK Official Soundtracks Album Chart	6
UK Official Compilations Chart	58
