= Ant-Man (soundtrack) =

Ant-Man (Original Motion Picture Soundtrack)

Film score by Christophe Beck
- Released: July 17, 2015 (Digital); August 7, 2015 (Physical)
- Genre: Film score
- Length: 1:05:20
- Labels: Hollywood; Marvel Music

Christophe Beck chronology
Hot Pursuit (2015)	Ant-Man (Original Motion Picture Soundtrack) (2015)	The Peanuts Movie (2015)

Ant-Man (Original Motion Picture Soundtrack) is the film score for the Marvel Studios film Ant-Man. The score was composed by Christophe Beck. Hollywood Records released the album digitally on July 17, 2015, and in physical formats on August 7, 2015.

One additional song, "Plainsong" by The Cure, is featured in the movie, but was not included on the soundtrack album. Siri plays the song as Yellowjacket and Ant-Man are fighting inside a briefcase near the end of the film. Additionally, Hot Poppin' Popcorn by The Wiggles plays at Cassie's Birthday Party.

== Background ==
In February 2014, director Edgar Wright tweeted that Steven Price would score the film. However, Price left soon after Wright's departure from the project in May 2014. In January 2015, Christophe Beck, who worked with Wright's replacement Peyton Reed on Bring It On, was hired to replace Price. Describing the film's score, Beck said, "For Ant-Man, I wanted to write a score in the grand symphonic tradition of my favorite superhero movies, with a sweeping scope and a big, catchy main theme. What makes this score stand out among other Marvel movies, though, is a sneaky sense of fun since it is, after all, not only a superhero movie, but also a heist comedy." The soundtrack was released digitally on July 17, 2015, and in physical media on August 7.

== Track listing ==
All music is composed by Christophe Beck except where otherwise noted.

No.	Title	Music	Length
1.	"Theme from Ant-Man"		2:46
2.	"Honey, I Shrunk Myself"		2:29
3.	"Escape from Jail"		1:51
4.	"Ant 247"		1:13
5.	"Paraponera Clavata"		1:24
6.	"San Francisco, 1987"		2:37
7.	"I'll Call Him Antony"		2:50
8.	"Tiny Telepathy"		2:02
9.	"First Mission" (Includes The Avengers theme by Alan Silvestri and the Falcon's theme from Captain America: The Winter Soldier by Henry Jackman)		3:23
10.	"Signal Decoy"		0:51
11.	"Old Man Have Safe"		2:25
12.	"Pym's Lab"		1:26
13.	"Antfiltration"		1:20
14.	"Your Mom Died a Hero"		2:03
15.	"Scott Surfs on Ants"		1:11
16.	"The Water Main"		1:14
17.	"CrossTech Break-In"		1:47
18.	"Into the Hornet's Nest"		3:00
19.	"Become the Hero"		1:52
20.	"Insecticide"		2:51
21.	"A Center for Ants!"		1:15
22.	"Cross Gets Cross"		1:52
23.	"Fight of the Bumblebee"		1:44
24.	"Ants on a Train"		1:43
25.	"Small Sacrifice"		3:36
26.	"About Damn Time"		0:39
27.	"Tales to Astonish!"		1:47
28.	"Borombon" (Album only)	Camilo Azuquita	2:49
29.	"Escape" (Album only)	Roy Ayers	2:14
30.	"I'm Ready" (Album only)	Commodores	3:20
31.	"Pink Gorilla" (Album only)	HLM	3:46
Total length:			65:20
