= Captain Marvel (soundtrack) =

Captain Marvel (Original Motion Picture Soundtrack)

Film score by Pinar Toprak
- Released: March 8, 2019
- Genre: Film score
- Length: 67:28
- Labels: Hollywood; Marvel Music

Pinar Toprak chronology
Purl (2019)	Captain Marvel (Original Motion Picture Soundtrack) (2019)	Skyfire (2019)

Captain Marvel (Original Motion Picture Soundtrack) is the soundtrack to the Marvel Studios film Captain Marvel. The score, composed by Pinar Toprak, was released by Hollywood Records on March 8, 2019, in the United States.

== Background ==
In May 2018, Clark Gregg indicated that the film's soundtrack would include songs from the 1990s. Pinar Toprak signed on to compose the film's score the following month, making her the first woman to score an MCU film. Directors Anna Boden and Ryan Fleck stated that while they wanted to bring in more women on the film, Toprak was not hired because of her gender but because she stood out as their favorite among a group of candidates that included both men and women. For her audition, Toprak hired a 70-piece orchestra to perform seven minutes of music that she composed. Toprak described the score as a fusion of electronic and orchestral sounds with the electronic parts representing the aliens and the orchestra representing the main character. Toprak recorded the electronic sounds on an analog-synthesizer in her home studio and recorded a 90-piece orchestra at Abbey Road Studios in London. Toprak said that the main part of the score's development was the title character's theme, while later developing themes for the Kree and the Skrulls, whom she tried to connect in order to "find the universe" for the film's scenes in space and Earth, while describing the scenes on Earth as "fun".

Toprak tried to develop the character's theme as a theme "that is recognizable from the first two notes", stating that "[the audience] don't always have time, especially later in the movie, to fully go into it". She began developing the film's theme by "humming ideas", eventually coming with "a minor-seven interval" during a walk, which she used as the film's theme. Toprak said that Carol Danvers' theme is "strong and powerful", but also emotional, in order to focus on the character's vulnerability. She also tried to showcase the character's "super fun and really witty" nature. Toprak was inspired by 90's films for the score, stating that "[b]ack then, action movie scores were a lot more note-y. Very dynamic with a lot of things going on", and that the score pays homage to the score to the action films from 1990." Toprak references Alan Silvestri's theme from The Avengers near the end of the film.

In April 2019, Mark Salcido of the website Screen Geek alleged that Marvel and the film's directors had been unhappy with Toprak's work on the film even after she had responded to "ample" notes, and had replaced her as composer for the film with Michael Giacchino. Giacchino responded to this report by confirming he was involved in the film, revealing that he had been asked to give feedback on Toprak's work while he was working with Marvel on the score for Spider-Man: Far From Home (2019). He thought Toprak had written a "beautiful theme and an inspiring score" for the film, and had helped her work on "a few cues" which he said was him supporting her as a fellow member of the Marvel "family". Giacchino made it clear that he "did not write the score to Captain Marvel ... bottom line is [Toprak] is a fabulous composer and certainly doesn't need me."

== Track listing ==
All music is composed by Pinar Toprak.

No.	Title	Length
1.	"Captain Marvel"	2:15
2.	"Waking Up"	1:28
3.	"Boarding the Train"	1:30
4.	"Why Do You Fight?"	1:14
5.	"Let's Bring Him Home"	1:39
6.	"Entering Enemy Territory"	3:33
7.	"Breaking Free"	5:24
8.	"Hot Pursuit"	4:34
9.	"Lost the Target"	2:10
10.	"Lifting Fingerprints"	1:31
11.	"Finding the Records"	5:20
12.	"Escaping the Basement"	4:23
13.	"Photos of Us"	1:56
14.	"Learning the Truth"	3:16
15.	"New Clothes"	1:04
16.	"Space Turbulence"	2:58
17.	"High Score"	2:35
18.	"Interrupting Something?"	1:30
19.	"Trapped"	3:19
20.	"I'm All Fired Up"	3:20
21.	"More Problems"	8:15
22.	"You Could Use a Jump"	1:45
23.	"This Isn't Goodbye"	2:29
Total length:		1:7:28

== Additional music ==
Additional music featured in the film includes:

- "Crazy on You" by Heart
- "Kiss Me Deadly" by Lita Ford
- "Whatta Man" by Salt-N-Pepa
- "Connection" by Elastica
- "Only Happy When It Rains" by Garbage
- "Crush with Eyeliner" by R.E.M.
- "Waterfalls" by TLC
- "You Gotta Be" by Des'ree
- "Come As You Are" by Nirvana
- "Just a Girl" by No Doubt
- "Man on the Moon" by R.E.M.
- "Please Mr. Postman" by The Marvelettes (sung by Samuel L. Jackson)
- "Celebrity Skin" by Hole

An official playlist containing these songs is available on Apple Music.

Radio Times praised the selection of tracks, saying, "Once again, Marvel has absolutely nailed its movie soundtrack", but also notes that the film's directors did not necessarily unearth relatively unknown "beloved classics" to incorporate "them into the very fabric of the film", unlike what James Gunn achieved with Guardians of the Galaxy.

== Charts ==
Chart (2019)	Peak position
Australian Digital Albums (ARIA)	26
UK Album Downloads (OCC)	49
