= Marvel Music =

Marvel Comics imprint (1994–1995)

- Parent company: Marvel Comics
- Status: Discontinued
- Predecessor: Marvel Music Groups (1981–1989)
- Founded: 1994
- Defunct: 1995
- Successor: Marvel Music (record label) (through Hollywood Records)
- Country of origin: United States
- Headquarters location: New York City
- Key people: Mort Todd (Editor); Karl Bollers; (assistant editor)
- Publication types: Comics
- Fiction genres: Music

Marvel Music was a short-lived imprint of Marvel Comics, introduced in 1994 to publish comics developed in collaboration with musicians.

The concept descended from previous Marvel collaborations with Kiss (which starred in a Marvel Comics Super Special featuring the band portrayed as superheroes fighting Marvel villains), and Alice Cooper. In an effort to diversify beyond superhero works, Marvel introduced the Marvel Music imprint in 1994, with Mort Todd as its editor. The imprint featured comics influenced by the life stories and music of various musicians and bands, having published works in collaboration with Alice Cooper, Billy Ray Cyrus, the estate of Bob Marley, Marty Stuart, Onyx, and the Rolling Stones.

The Marvel Music series was considered unsuccessful; Todd felt that Marvel did not market the series well, while only Marty Stuart took up Marvel's suggestion to sell the comics as concert merchandise. Marvel's president Terry Stewart felt that the imprint may have been "doomed at the beginning", and it was discontinued in 1995 in the wake of Marvel's descent into bankruptcy.

== Background ==
Marvel had previously published some music-based comics; the premiere issue of Marvel Comics Super Special, dated simply 1977, featured the rock band Kiss in a 40-page fictional adventure written by Steve Gerber, penciled by John Romita Jr., Alan Weiss, John Buscema, Rich Buckler, and Sal Buscema, which saw the quartet battling Marvel supervillains Mephisto and Doctor Doom. Issue 50 of Marvel Premiere (stand date of October 1979) featured a story, Tales From the Inside, featuring Alice Cooper. In 1954, Marvel's predecessor Atlas Comics did a one-shot called World's Greatest Songs featuring the life story of Eddie Fisher.

== History ==
In 1991, Neil Gaiman was approached by an Epic Records executive, seeking help in developing a concept album for Alice Cooper. Gaiman was interested in the project, having been familiar with Cooper, telling Spin that "when I was a kid 15 years earlier than that, I had read Marvel Premiere #50, Alice Cooper: Tales From the Inside, and I also loved Welcome to My Nightmare. My cousins were the Alice Cooper fans; I was the David Bowie, Lou Reed fan. But they had made me watch 'Teenage Lament '74' on Top of the Pops."

Marvel president Terry Stewart was seeking to diversify Marvel's output beyond superhero comics; noticing the popularity of Revolutionary Comics' Rock 'N' Roll Comics series, which featured unauthorized biographies of bands, Stewart felt that there was a market for comics based on musicians. Marvel published Cheap Trick: Busted and Boo-Yaa T.R.I.B.E: Coming to Yaa as test runs in 1990. Stewart enlisted Mort Todd to serve as an editor for a music-focused imprint. The concept was met with some skepticism internally; assistant editor Karl Bollers recalled that "[when the] superhero heads in the office heard that we were doing rock comics, there was a feeling of, 'Oh my god, this is terrible!'", showing concerns that the idea would either be too kitschy, or follow in the footsteps of Revolutionary, which had been sued twice by musicians over their portrayals in Rock 'N' Roll Comics.

In contrast to Rock 'N' Roll Comics, Marvel planned to grant creative control over its music comics to their respective musicians; Onyx worked directly with Bollers (who was a fan of their debut album Bacdafucup) to develop Onyx: Fight!, a post-apocalyptic story which was written as a tie-in to their sophomore album All We Got Iz Us. Group member Sticky Fingaz was supportive of their collaboration, as he was a fan of Marvel Comics himself. Alice Cooper's collaboration with Gaiman, "The Last Temptation", was adapted into a comic and released under the imprint in June 1994. KRS-One collaborated on Break the Chain, a one-shot title that was bundled with an audio cassette that featured the story in the comic that also incorporated his music. Another entry in the series, Tale Of The Tuff Gong, was a biographical story based on the life of Bob Marley.

The titles were hampered by poor promotion. Todd felt that Marvel "didn't know how to sell anything that wasn't superheroes", recalling that, "I was talking with their marketing people, and they were like, 'You know, we just can't really sell Elvis or Bob Marley.' And I was like, 'What? There are companies that sell Elvis tampons, and you can't sell an Elvis comic book? What? People love Elvis, people love comics!' So I was infuriated with Marvel and didn't renew my contract." To reach their target audience, Marvel suggested that the comics also be sold as concert merchandise. However, only Marty Stuart took up this recommendation; subsequently, Marty Party in Space was among the best-selling titles under the Marvel Music imprint, alongside the Rolling Stones' Voodoo Lounge.

With Marvel heading into bankruptcy, the imprint was discontinued in 1995. In retrospect, Stewart felt that "Maybe it was doomed from the beginning, there just wasn’t enough of a market. Was it because we couldn’t get into the record stores? I don’t know."

The Marvel Music name is presently used by an unrelated unit of Marvel Studios, responsible for releasing its film soundtracks.

== Titles ==
These comics featured the life stories of famous musicians and bands, while some were album-oriented mini-dramas, drawn song lyrics or superhero fantasies. All of these comics were made with the performers' input. The imprint used the square, bound graphic novels as they were considered better price points for bookstores.

- Bob Marley: Tale Of The Tuff Gong #1–3 (1994–1995)
- Alice Cooper: The Last Temptation #1–3, by Neil Gaiman and Michael Zulli, with Alice Cooper (1994) — based on The Last Temptation album by Alice Cooper
  - The Compleat Alice Cooper: Incorporating the Three Acts of Alice Cooper, The Last Temptation, by Neil Gaiman; Michael Zulli; Alice Cooper (1995)
- Break The Chain, based on the life of KRS-One — issue #1 included an audio cassette of its title track. (1994)
- Woodstock, 1969–1994, by Mort Todd and Charles Schneider, illustrated by Pat Redding (1994) ISBN 0-7851-0075-X
- Marty Stuart: Marty Party In Space, by Paul S. Newman, Marty Stuart, and Pat Boyette (1995)
- Billy Ray Cyrus, by Paul S. Newman, Dan Barry, and Gail Beckett (1995)
- Rolling Stones: Voodoo Lounge, by Dave McKean (1995)
- Onyx: Fight! by Karl Bollers and Larry Lee (1995)
