= Marvel Cinematic Universe: Phase Four =

2021–22 group of superhero media

Phase Four
- Based on: Characters published by Marvel Comics
- Produced by: Kevin Feige; Jonathan Schwartz (SC); Nate Moore (Eternals & WF); Amy Pascal (NWH); Brad Winderbaum (LaT)
- Starring: See below
- Production companies: Marvel Studios; Marvel Studios Animation (animated series); Columbia Pictures (NWH)
- Distributed by: Walt Disney Studios Motion Pictures; Sony Pictures Releasing (NWH); Disney Platform Distribution (TV series and specials)
- Release date: 2021–2022
- Country: United States
- Language: English
- Budget: Total (7 films): $1.46–1.54 billion
- Box office: Total (7 films): $5.712 billion

Marvel Cinematic Universe Phases
- The Infinity Saga; Phase One (2008–2012); Phase Two (2013–2015); Phase Three (2016–2019)
- The Multiverse Saga; Phase Four (2021–2022); Phase Five (2023–2025); Phase Six (2025–2027)

Phase Four of the Marvel Cinematic Universe (MCU) is a group of American superhero films and television series produced by Marvel Studios based on characters that appear in publications by Marvel Comics. The MCU is the shared universe in which all of the films and series are set. This was the first phase to include television content from Marvel Studios, with multiple series and specials—marketed as "Marvel Studios Special Presentations"—produced for the streaming service Disney+. The franchise also expanded to animation from Marvel Studios Animation. The COVID-19 pandemic impacted the phase, leading to various schedule changes. It ultimately began with the series WandaVision in January 2021 and ended with the special The Guardians of the Galaxy Holiday Special in November 2022. Phases Four, Five, and Six make up "The Multiverse Saga" storyline.

Kevin Feige produced every film in the phase, with Amy Pascal also producing Spider-Man: No Way Home (2021)—a co-production between Marvel Studios and Columbia Pictures—and Marvel Studios executives Jonathan Schwartz, Nate Moore, and Brad Winderbaum also producing some of the phase's other films. The films star Scarlett Johansson as Natasha Romanoff / Black Widow in Black Widow (2021), Simu Liu as Xu Shang-Chi in Shang-Chi and the Legend of the Ten Rings (2021), Gemma Chan as Sersi in Eternals (2021), Tom Holland as Peter Parker / Spider-Man in No Way Home, Benedict Cumberbatch as Dr. Stephen Strange in Doctor Strange in the Multiverse of Madness (2022), Chris Hemsworth as Thor in Thor: Love and Thunder (2022), and Letitia Wright as Shuri / Black Panther in Black Panther: Wakanda Forever (2022). Walt Disney Studios Motion Pictures distributed the films except for No Way Home, which was released by Sony Pictures Releasing. The phase's films grossed over US$5.7 billion at the global box office.

Unlike previous MCU television series that were produced by Marvel Television, separately from Marvel Studios, the Phase Four Disney+ series were overseen by Feige and have close connections to the MCU films, starring actors from the films or introducing new characters for planned future film appearances. The television series star Elizabeth Olsen as Wanda Maximoff / Scarlet Witch and Paul Bettany as Vision in WandaVision, Anthony Mackie as Sam Wilson / Falcon and Sebastian Stan as Bucky Barnes / Winter Soldier in The Falcon and the Winter Soldier (2021), Tom Hiddleston as Loki in the first season of Loki (2021), Jeffrey Wright as the Watcher in the first season of the animated What If...? (2021), Jeremy Renner as Clint Barton / Hawkeye and Hailee Steinfeld as Kate Bishop / Hawkeye in Hawkeye (2021), Oscar Isaac as Marc Spector / Moon Knight and Steven Grant / Mr. Knight in Moon Knight (2022), Iman Vellani as Kamala Khan / Ms. Marvel in Ms. Marvel (2022), and Tatiana Maslany as Jennifer Walters / She-Hulk in She-Hulk: Attorney at Law (2022).

In addition to the feature films and television series, the phase also includes two television specials: Werewolf by Night (2022) starring Gael García Bernal as Jack Russell / Werewolf by Night and The Guardians of the Galaxy Holiday Special starring Chris Pratt as Peter Quill / Star-Lord. The first season of the I Am Groot animated shorts and some tie-in comic books are also included. Benedict Wong has the most appearances in the phase, starring or making cameo appearances as Wong in three films and two television series. The large amount of content produced for this phase led to discussions about quality versus quantity, and whether Marvel Studios still had a concrete roadmap for the franchise.

== Development ==
=== Initial work and announcement ===
By October 2016, Walt Disney Studios had scheduled multiple release dates for untitled Marvel Studios films for 2020 and 2021. Marvel Studios president Kevin Feige said some of the films for those dates were already known, explaining, "We know what [films] we'd like them to be for 2020. Over the years, where we're aiming we've been lucky enough that it's usually been the same thing but we always leave ourselves the opportunity to bob and weave and adapt if we have to." Feige was not sure if Marvel would continue to group the films of the MCU into phases once Phase Three concluded in 2019, saying that "it might be a new thing", but by December 2018, Marvel was believed to be using the term Phase Four. Feige said Marvel hoped to reveal some upcoming films after the release of Avengers: Endgame (2019), with the Walt Disney Company CEO Bob Iger later indicating that Marvel would reveal its slate of post-Avengers: Endgame films in mid-2019.

By November 2017, Disney was developing a Marvel television series specifically for release on its new streaming service Disney+, which was planned to launch before the end of 2019. In September 2018, Marvel Studios was revealed to be developing several limited series for the service, to be centered on "second-tier" characters from the MCU films who had not and were unlikely to star in their own films; the actors who portrayed the characters in the films were expected to reprise their roles for the series. Stories for each series were still being decided on, but the series were expected to be six to eight episodes each and have a "hefty [budget] rivaling those of a major studio production". The series would be produced by Marvel Studios rather than Marvel Television, which produced the previous television series set in the MCU. Feige was taking a "hands-on role" in each series' development, focusing on "continuity of story" with the films and "handling" the actors who would be reprising their roles from the films. Feige stated in February 2019 that the series would be "entirely interwoven with both the current MCU, the past MCU, and the future of the MCU", and a month later he elaborated that the series would take characters from the films, change them, and see those changes reflected in future films, unlike the weaker relationship the films have with the Marvel Television series. He also said that new characters introduced in the Disney+ series could go on to appear in films. In May, Feige compared the Disney+ series to the Marvel One-Shots short films that Marvel Studios had previously released alongside their films, saying, "The best thing about the One-Shots is that we got to flesh out other characters. It's tremendously exciting that we now have Disney+ series where we get to do that on a grand scale".

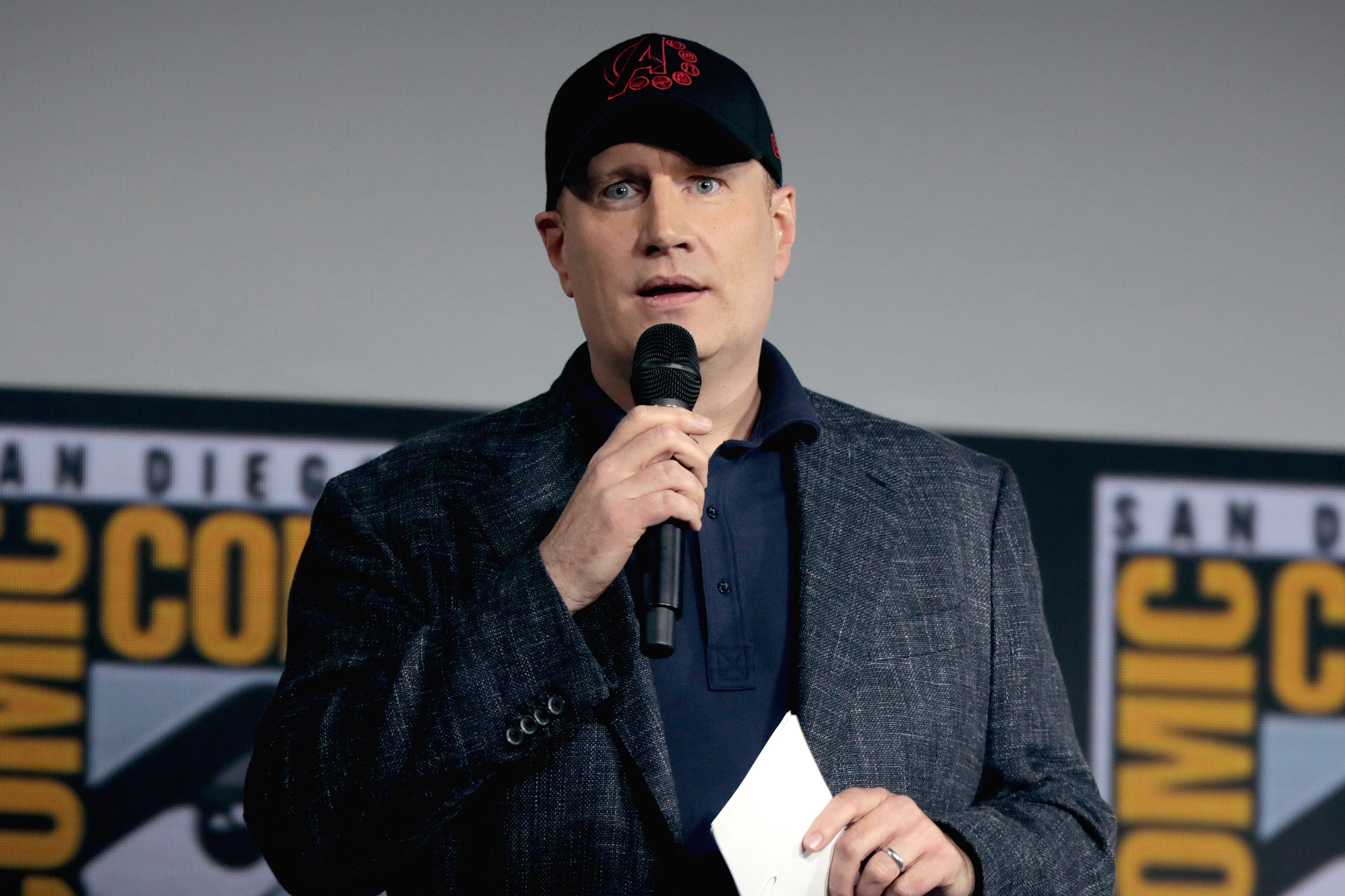
Kevin Feige announcing Phase Four titles at the 2019 San Diego Comic-Con

In July 2019, Marvel Studios held a panel at San Diego Comic-Con where Feige announced the full Phase Four slate. This included five films to be released—Black Widow, Eternals, Shang-Chi and the Legend of the Ten Rings, Doctor Strange in the Multiverse of Madness, and Thor: Love and Thunder—as well as five event series to be released on Disney+—The Falcon and the Winter Soldier, WandaVision, Loki, What If...?, and Hawkeye. He confirmed that there would be connections between the films and series, with the events of WandaVision directly setting up Doctor Strange in the Multiverse of Madness and Loki tying into it. Feige stated that these ten projects were the full Phase Four slate at that point, despite Marvel already developing further projects at that time, such as the long-in-development Guardians of the Galaxy Vol. 3, sequels to Black Panther (2018) and Captain Marvel (2019), and a film based on the Fantastic Four. Feige also noted that the studio had films scheduled to be released after 2021 which would not be officially announced or given release dates at that time. A month later at D23, Feige announced three more Disney+ series that would be released as part of the Phase Four slate: Ms. Marvel, Moon Knight, and She-Hulk: Attorney at Law, as well as the Black Panther sequel with the placeholder title Black Panther II and a May 6, 2022, release. In September, Disney and Sony Pictures announced that Marvel Studios and Feige would return to produce Spider-Man: No Way Home, set for release during this phase.

=== Impact of the COVID-19 pandemic and further work ===
Black Widow was removed from Disney's release schedule in March 2020 due to the COVID-19 pandemic. Discussing this decision for Variety, Adam B. Vary and Matt Donnelly questioned whether the MCU could be impacted more by this delay than other big properties due to the interconnected nature of the franchise, though a Marvel Studios source told the pair that changing Black Widow's release date would not affect the rest of the MCU timeline. In April, Disney changed its entire Phase Four release slate, scheduling Black Widow when Eternals had been set for release in November 2020 and moving all its other Phase Four films back in the schedule to accommodate this. Later that month, Sony delayed Spider-Man: No Way Home to November 2021, resulting in Disney adjusting the release of Doctor Strange in the Multiverse of Madness and Thor: Love and Thunder. In July 2020, Disney confirmed that The Falcon and the Winter Soldier would not release in August 2020 as planned, because the series had not completed filming due to the COVID-19 pandemic, while Sony pushed back the release of Spider-Man: No Way Home to December 2021. In early September, WandaVision was set to be the first television series released for the phase as The Falcon and the Winter Soldier's release was pushed back to 2021 due to its production delays. Later that month, Black Widow's release was delayed to May 2021, resulting in Eternals and Shang-Chi and the Legends of the Ten Rings also being rescheduled; this made 2020 the first year since 2009 without a Marvel Studios release. When adjusting the release of the films and series in the phase, Marvel Studios was being cognizant to ensure major story points would not be spoiled with the new release order, but Feige noted many of the properties in the Phase were mostly standalone or a continuation from Endgame. He also credited the studio's "long lead plan" for being able to avoid any creative shifts to their Phase Four plans because of the pandemic, only shuffling release dates and production schedules. Additionally, he stated that many of the series had their release dates shifted only "by a matter of weeks" from their original dates. The only significant aspect of the phase that was affected by the pandemic was Julia Louis-Dreyfus's introduction as Valentina Allegra de Fontaine, which came in The Falcon and the Winter Soldier rather than Black Widow as was originally planned, since Black Widow ended up being released after the series.

In December 2020, Marvel Studios adjusted Thor: Love and Thunder and Black Panther II back in its schedule, to May 6 and July 8, 2022, respectively, and also announced Ant-Man and the Wasp: Quantumania and a Fantastic Four film were in development, along with the Disney+ miniseries Secret Invasion, Ironheart, and Armor Wars (later changed to a film), The Guardians of the Galaxy Holiday Special, and the series of short films I Am Groot. These new Disney+ series, plus Black Panther II, Captain Marvel 2 (later retitled The Marvels), Ant-Man and the Wasp: Quantumania, Guardians of the Galaxy Vol. 3, and Fantastic Four, were believed to be a part of Phase Four at this time. Feige had been pressured into including titles that were not close to being ready to announce, with some being significantly overhauled or delayed after the announcement.

In March 2021, Disney moved Black Widow to July 2021 (taking the spot of Shang-Chi and the Legend of the Ten Rings), and announced that it would release simultaneously in theaters and on Disney+ with Premier Access. Shang-Chi and the Legend of the Ten Rings was moved to September 2021, with the intent for a theatrical-only release. In May, Marvel Studios announced the title for the Black Panther sequel as Black Panther: Wakanda Forever. Feige described the phase as being about "continuing in new ways and... leaving the Infinity Saga behind [for] a new beginning". By August 2021, a Halloween-themed television special for Disney+ was in development, reportedly centered on Werewolf by Night. In October 2021, Marvel Studios further adjusted Doctor Strange in the Multiverse of Madness, Thor: Love and Thunder, and Black Panther: Wakanda Forever to May 6, July 8, and November 11, 2022, respectively, because of production-related issues.

In late June 2022, Feige indicated that Phase Four was nearing its conclusion, stating audiences would begin to see where the next saga of the MCU would be heading, and that there had been many clues in the phase to what that would be. He said Marvel Studios would be a "little more direct" on their future plans in the following months to provide audiences with "the bigger picture [so they] can see a tiny, tiny bit more of the roadmap". At Marvel Studios' San Diego Comic-Con panel in July, Feige announced that Wakanda Forever would conclude Phase Four, with other films and Disney+ series believed to be part of the phase moving to Phase Five and Phase Six. He also announced that Phase Four would be the first phase, along with Phases Five and Six, of "The Multiverse Saga". Feige stated that many of the projects in Phases Four and Five, and their post-credit teases, would connect and lead towards the conclusion of the Multiverse Saga, while some would remain standalone. James Gunn, the writer and director of the Guardians of the Galaxy films, said that The Guardians of the Galaxy Holiday Special was the epilogue of Phase Four. At the 2022 D23 Expo, Marvel confirmed the Halloween special as Werewolf by Night. At that time, Werewolf by Night and The Guardians of the Galaxy Holiday Special were revealed to be marketed as "Marvel Studios Special Presentations".

== Films ==
Phase Four films
Film	U.S. release date	Directed by	Screenplay by	Produced by
Black Widow	July 9, 2021 (Note: Black Widow was released concurrently on Disney+ with Premier Access.)	Cate Shortland	Eric Pearson	Kevin Feige
Shang-Chi and the Legend of the Ten Rings	September 3, 2021	Destin Daniel Cretton	Dave Callaham & Destin Daniel Cretton & Andrew Lanham	Kevin Feige and Jonathan Schwartz
Eternals	November 5, 2021	Chloé Zhao	Chloé Zhao and Chloé Zhao & Patrick Burleigh and Ryan Firpo & Kaz Firpo (Note: Zhao is credited both as a solo writer and as part of a writing team with Burleigh.)	Kevin Feige and Nate Moore
Spider-Man: No Way Home	December 17, 2021	Jon Watts	Chris McKenna & Erik Sommers	Kevin Feige and Amy Pascal
Doctor Strange in the Multiverse of Madness	May 6, 2022	Sam Raimi	Michael Waldron	Kevin Feige
Thor: Love and Thunder	July 8, 2022	Taika Waititi	Taika Waititi & Jennifer Kaytin Robinson	Kevin Feige and Brad Winderbaum
Black Panther: Wakanda Forever	November 11, 2022	Ryan Coogler	Ryan Coogler & Joe Robert Cole	Kevin Feige and Nate Moore

=== Black Widow (2021) ===
Natasha Romanoff finds herself alone and forced to confront a dangerous conspiracy with ties to her past. Pursued by a force that will stop at nothing to bring her down, Romanoff must deal with her history as a spy and the broken relationships left in her wake long before she became an Avenger.

After exploring the backstory of Scarlett Johansson's character Natasha Romanoff / Black Widow in Avengers: Age of Ultron (2015), Kevin Feige expressed interest in further exploring it in a solo film. By January 2018, Jac Schaeffer was hired to write the script, with Cate Shortland hired to direct that July. Ned Benson was rewriting the script the next February. Schaeffer and Benson received story credit on the film, with Eric Pearson credited for the screenplay. Filming began in May 2019 and concluded that October, shooting in Norway, the United Kingdom, Budapest, Morocco, and Georgia. Black Widow premiered on June 29, 2021, at various red carpet fan events in London, Los Angeles, Melbourne, and New York City, and was released in the United States on July 9, 2021, in theaters and on Disney+ with Premier Access.

Black Widow is set in 2016, mostly taking place between the main plot of Captain America: Civil War (2016) and its final scene. William Hurt reprises his role as Thaddeus Ross from previous MCU films. Black Widow's post-credits scene features Julia Louis-Dreyfus, uncredited, as Valentina Allegra de Fontaine from the series The Falcon and the Winter Soldier (2021), and sets up Florence Pugh's appearance in the series Hawkeye (2021) as Yelena Belova. Jeremy Renner has an uncredited voice cameo in his MCU role of Clint Barton / Hawkeye, while a picture of him is also featured.

=== Shang-Chi and the Legend of the Ten Rings (2021) ===
When Shang-Chi is drawn into the clandestine Ten Rings organization, he is forced to confront the past he thought he left behind.

By December 2018, Marvel Studios was actively developing their first Asian-led film for Shang-Chi, with Dave Callaham hired to write the screenplay, and Destin Daniel Cretton to direct by March 2019. At San Diego Comic-Con that July, Simu Liu was revealed to play the title role, along with Tony Leung as Wenwu. Filming began in February 2020, but was halted in March due to the COVID-19 pandemic. Production resumed in August and concluded that October. Shooting occurred in Australia and San Francisco. In April 2021, Cretton was revealed as a credited writer along with Callaham and Andrew Lanham. Shang-Chi and the Legend of the Ten Rings premiered in Los Angeles on August 16, 2021, and was released in the United States on September 3, 2021.

Shang-Chi and the Legend of the Ten Rings is set after the events of Avengers: Endgame (2019), during the days leading to the Qingming Festival in early April. Benedict Wong reprises his role as Wong from previous MCU films, along with Ben Kingsley as Trevor Slattery, an impostor posing as the Mandarin, from Iron Man 3 (2013) and the Marvel One-Shot All Hail the King (2014). The Ten Rings organization has been featured or referenced in Iron Man (2008), Iron Man 2 (2010), All Hail the King, and Ant-Man (2015). Tim Roth also provided uncredited vocals for Emil Blonsky / Abomination, reprising the role from The Incredible Hulk (2008), while the mid-credits scene features Mark Ruffalo and Brie Larson, uncredited, in their respective MCU roles of Bruce Banner and Carol Danvers / Captain Marvel.

=== Eternals (2021) ===
After the return of half the population ignites "the emergence", the Eternals—an immortal alien race created by the Celestials who have secretly lived on Earth for over 7,000 years—reunite to protect humanity from their evil counterparts, the Deviants.

By early 2018, Marvel Studios was developing a film for the Eternals, with Kaz Firpo and Ryan Firpo writing the script to focus on a love story between the characters Sersi and Ikaris. Late that September, Chloé Zhao was hired to direct The Eternals, and also served as the film's credited writer along with Patrick Burleigh and the Firpos. Filming occurred from July 2019 to February 2020, shooting throughout England. The main cast, headlined by Richard Madden as Ikaris and Angelina Jolie as Thena, was announced at the July 2019 San Diego Comic-Con, with Gemma Chan cast as Sersi the next month. The title was shortened in August 2020. Eternals premiered in Los Angeles on October 18, 2021, and was released in the United States on November 5.

Eternals takes place around the same time as The Falcon and the Winter Soldier and Spider-Man: Far From Home (2019), six to eight months after Avengers: Endgame in 2024. The mid-credits scene features Harry Styles as Thanos's brother Eros / Starfox and Patton Oswalt as Pip the Troll, while Mahershala Ali has an uncredited cameo as the voice of Blade in the post-credits scene, teasing the then-planned film Blade.

=== Spider-Man: No Way Home (2021) ===
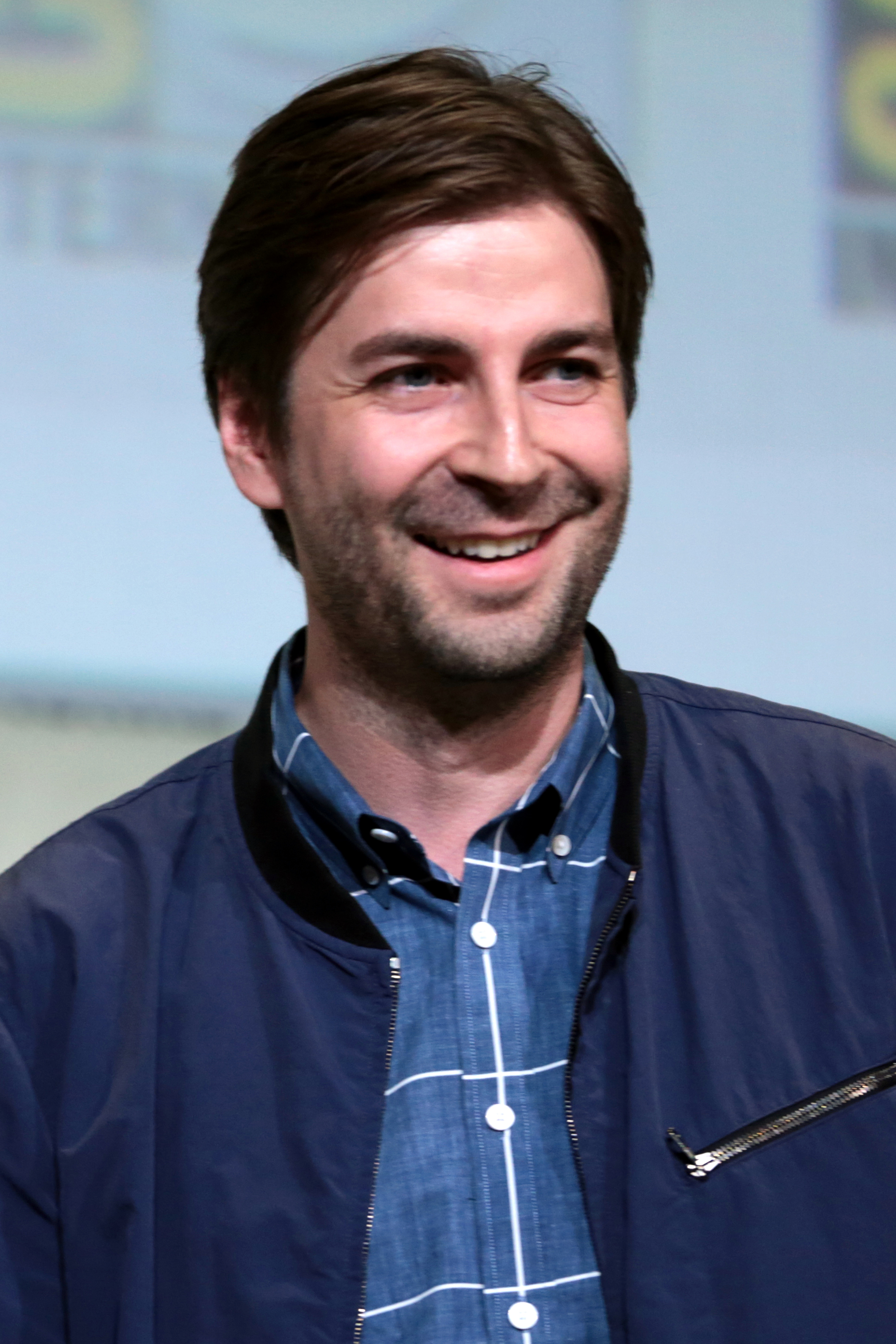
Jon Watts, director of the Spider-Man films

Peter Parker's life and reputation are turned upside down following his identity being exposed at the hands of Mysterio. Seeking help from Stephen Strange to try and fix everything, things soon become much more dangerous when the multiverse breaks open, allowing villains from alternate realities who have previously fought versions of Spider-Man to arrive.

A third MCU Spider-Man film was planned by early 2017 to be set during Peter Parker's senior year of high school, with Feige later saying it would tell "a Peter Parker story" not previously done on film due to the mid-credits scene in Spider-Man: Far From Home. By August 2019, Chris McKenna and Erik Sommers were writing the script while Disney and Sony split on adjusting their agreement over Marvel Studios' involvement in Spider-Man films, but announced the next month they would co-produce the film, with Tom Holland returning to star, along with Jon Watts as director by June 2020. Filming began in October 2020 in New York City, before moving to Trilith Studios in Atlanta, Georgia later that month. The title was officially announced in February 2021, before filming concluded in late March. Producer Amy Pascal described the film as "the culmination of the Homecoming trilogy". Spider-Man: No Way Home premiered in Los Angeles on December 13, 2021, and was released in the United States on December 17, 2021.

Spider-Man: No Way Home begins immediately after the events of Spider-Man: Far From Home, and continues over late 2024, while also tying into Doctor Strange in the Multiverse of Madness (2022); Benedict Cumberbatch and Benedict Wong reprise their roles as Dr. Stephen Strange and Wong, respectively. No Way Home explores the concept of the multiverse and ties the MCU to past Spider-Man film series, with Tobey Maguire and Andrew Garfield returning as their versions of Spider-Man from Sam Raimi's Spider-Man trilogy and Marc Webb's The Amazing Spider-Man films, who were respectively dubbed "Peter-Two" and "Peter-Three", alongside Willem Dafoe as Norman Osborn / Green Goblin, Alfred Molina as Otto Octavius / Doctor Octopus, and Thomas Haden Church as Flint Marko / Sandman from the Raimi films, and Rhys Ifans as Curt Connors / Lizard and Jamie Foxx as Max Dillon / Electro from the Webb films. Charlie Cox appears as Matt Murdock, reprising the role from Marvel Television's Netflix series, while Tom Hardy appears, uncredited, in the mid-credits scene as Eddie Brock / Venom, reprising his role from Sony's Spider-Man Universe.

=== Doctor Strange in the Multiverse of Madness (2022) ===
Dr. Stephen Strange protects America Chavez, a teenager capable of traveling between universes in the multiverse, from Wanda Maximoff / Scarlet Witch.

By December 2018, Doctor Strange (2016) director and co-writer Scott Derrickson signed to direct a sequel, with Benedict Cumberbatch reprising his title role. The title was officially announced at the 2019 San Diego Comic-Con, along with Elizabeth Olsen's involvement. In January 2020, Derrickson stepped down as director over creative differences, but remained an executive producer. The next month, Sam Raimi signed on to direct, and Loki (2021) head writer Michael Waldron joined to rewrite the script; Raimi confirmed his involvement in April 2020. Filming began by November 2020 in London, but was halted in January 2021 due to the COVID-19 pandemic. Production resumed by that March, and concluded in mid-April 2021 in Somerset. Shooting also occurred at Longcross Studios in Surrey. Doctor Strange in the Multiverse of Madness premiered in Hollywood on May 2, 2022, and was released in the United States on May 6, 2022.

Doctor Strange in the Multiverse of Madness is set after the events of Spider-Man: No Way Home. Elizabeth Olsen co-stars as Wanda Maximoff / Scarlet Witch, continuing from her appearance in the series WandaVision (2021), with Julian Hilliard and Jett Klyne portraying alternate versions of Maximoff's sons Billy and Tommy, respectively. The film introduces the Illuminati, a group of heroes from the alternate universe Earth-838, which consists of Patrick Stewart as Charles Xavier / Professor X (after playing a different version of the character in 20th Century Fox's X-Men film series), Hayley Atwell as Peggy Carter / Captain Carter (after voicing a similar version in the animated series What If...?), Lashana Lynch as Maria Rambeau / Captain Marvel (after playing the main MCU version of Rambeau in Captain Marvel), Anson Mount as Blackagar Boltagon / Black Bolt (after playing another version of Black Bolt in Marvel's ABC television series Inhumans), and John Krasinski as Reed Richards / Mister Fantastic, a member of the Fantastic Four.

=== Thor: Love and Thunder (2022) ===
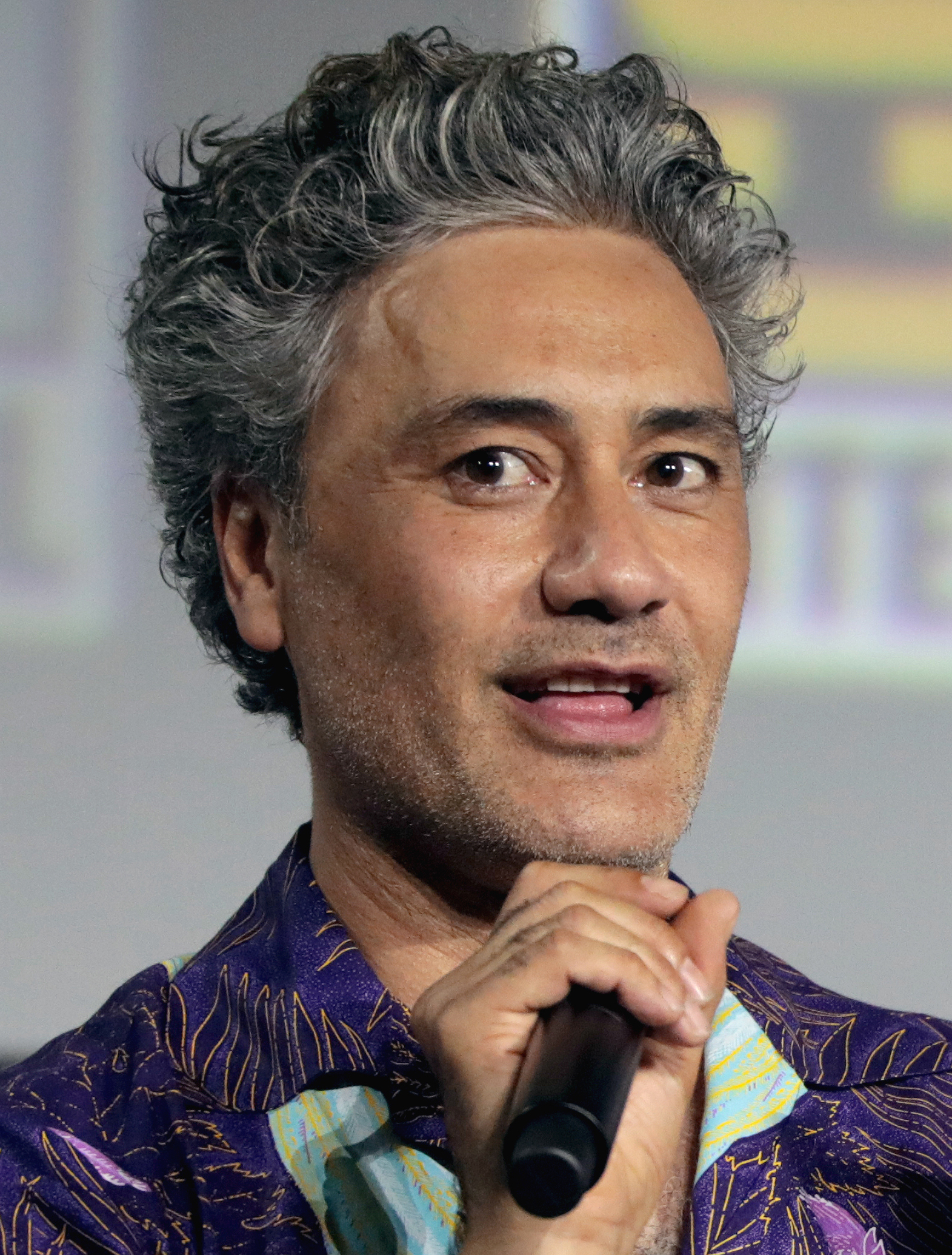
Taika Waititi, director of Thor: Ragnarok and Thor: Love and Thunder

Thor attempts to find inner peace but ends up recruiting Valkyrie, Korg, and Jane Foster—who has become the Mighty Thor—to help stop Gorr the God Butcher from eliminating all gods.

Chris Hemsworth expressed ongoing interest to return as Thor in January 2018, at the time his Marvel Studios contract had come to an end. After previously directing Thor: Ragnarok (2017), Taika Waititi signed on to write and direct a fourth Thor film in July 2019, and the title was officially announced at San Diego Comic-Con later that month, with Hemsworth returning alongside Tessa Thompson as Valkyrie and Natalie Portman as Jane Foster, who becomes the superhero the Mighty Thor. Jennifer Kaytin Robinson joined to co-write the script with Waititi in February 2020. Filming began late January 2021 in Australia, and concluded that June. Thor: Love and Thunder premiered in Los Angeles on June 23, 2022, and was released in the United States on July 8, 2022.

Thor: Love and Thunder is set after the events of Avengers: Endgame, eight and a half years after Thor broke up with Foster, which had occurred by Ragnarok, and "a few weeks" since Thor joined the Guardians of the Galaxy, who appear in the film, with Chris Pratt, Karen Gillan, Dave Bautista, Pom Klementieff, Sean Gunn, Vin Diesel, and Bradley Cooper reprising their respective MCU roles as Peter Quill / Star-Lord, Nebula, Drax the Destroyer, Mantis, Kraglin Obfonteri, Groot, and Rocket. Daley Pearson appears as Darryl, after first portraying the role in the Team Thor short films.

=== Black Panther: Wakanda Forever (2022) ===
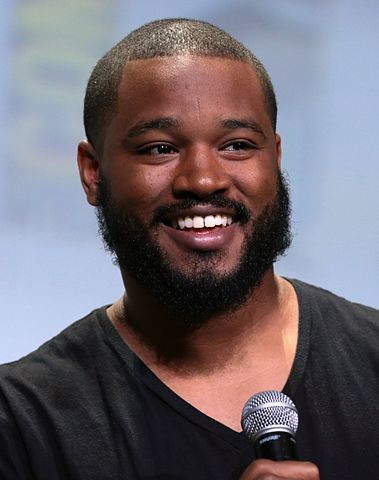
Ryan Coogler, director of Black Panther and Black Panther: Wakanda Forever

The leaders of the kingdom of Wakanda fight to protect their nation in the wake of King T'Challa's death, and a new threat emerges from the hidden undersea nation of Talokan.

By October 2018, Ryan Coogler signed on to write and direct a sequel to Black Panther (2018). Joe Robert Cole also returned for the film to once again co-write the screenplay with Coogler. Feige confirmed the film was in development by mid-2019 with the placeholder title Black Panther II. Plans for the film changed in August 2020 when Black Panther star Chadwick Boseman died from colon cancer, with his role as T'Challa not recast. Some of the main returning cast members were confirmed by that November, with Letitia Wright headlining the film as Shuri / Black Panther. The title, Black Panther: Wakanda Forever, was revealed in May 2021. Production began in late June 2021 at Trilith Studios in Atlanta, and lasted until early November 2021, before a hiatus began later that month. Filming resumed in mid-January 2022. Shooting also occurred in Boston and Worcester, Massachusetts, and in Brunswick, Georgia, before wrapping in Puerto Rico in March 2022. Black Panther: Wakanda Forever premiered in Hollywood on October 26, 2022, and was released on November 11, 2022.

Black Panther: Wakanda Forever is set after the events of Spider-Man: No Way Home, and "potentially concurrent" with Love and Thunder and Ant-Man and the Wasp: Quantumania (2023) according to producer Nate Moore. Dominique Thorne appears as Riri Williams / Ironheart, ahead of starring in the Disney+ series Ironheart (2025). Julia Louis-Dreyfus reprises her MCU role as Valentina Allegra de Fontaine, now serving as the director of the CIA.

== Television series ==
All the series in Phase Four were released on Disney+.

Television series of Phase Four
Series	Season	Episodes	Originally released		Production division	Head writer	Lead director(s)
Series	Season	Episodes	First released	Last released	Production division	Head writer	Lead director(s)
WandaVision	1	9	January 15, 2021	March 5, 2021	—N/a	Jac Schaeffer	Matt Shakman
The Falcon and the Winter Soldier	1	6	March 19, 2021	April 23, 2021	—N/a	Malcolm Spellman	Kari Skogland
Loki	1	6	June 9, 2021	July 14, 2021	—N/a	Michael Waldron	Kate Herron
What If...?	1	9	August 11, 2021	October 6, 2021	Marvel Studios Animation	A. C. Bradley	Bryan Andrews
Hawkeye	1	6	November 24, 2021	December 22, 2021	—N/a	Jonathan Igla	Rhys Thomas
Moon Knight	1	6	March 30, 2022	May 4, 2022	—N/a	Jeremy Slater	Mohamed Diab
Ms. Marvel	1	6	June 8, 2022	July 13, 2022	—N/a	Bisha K. Ali	Adil & Bilall
She-Hulk: Attorney at Law	1	9	August 18, 2022	October 13, 2022	—N/a	Jessica Gao	Kat Coiro

=== WandaVision (2021) ===
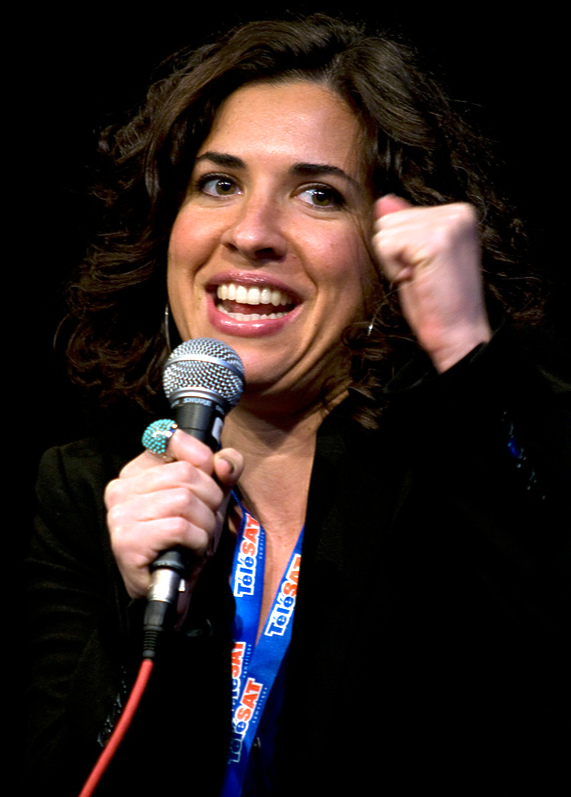
Jac Schaeffer, story writer of Black Widow and head writer of WandaVision

Wanda Maximoff and Vision are living an idyllic suburban life in the town of Westview, New Jersey, trying to conceal their true natures. As their surroundings begin to move through different decades and they encounter various television tropes, the couple suspects that things are not as they seem.

By September 2018, Marvel Studios was developing a limited series starring Elizabeth Olsen as Wanda Maximoff and Paul Bettany as Vision, with a focus on their relationship. Jac Schaeffer was hired to write the first episode and serve as head writer in January 2019, and the series was officially announced and titled that April, with Olsen and Bettany confirmed. It explores where Maximoff's alias the Scarlet Witch comes from. Filming began in November 2019 at Pinewood Atlanta Studios, with Matt Shakman directing the series, but was suspended in March 2020 due to the COVID-19 pandemic. Production resumed in Los Angeles in September 2020, and concluded that November. WandaVision premiered on January 15, 2021, and ran for nine episodes, concluding on March 5, 2021. It is the start of a trilogy of series that includes: Agatha All Along, starring Kathryn Hahn as Agatha Harkness, which debuted in September 2024, as part of Phase Five; and VisionQuest, with Bettany reprising his role, which is set to debut in late 2026, as part of Phase Six.

WandaVision is set three weeks after the events of Avengers: Endgame, and directly sets up Doctor Strange in the Multiverse of Madness, which also features Maximoff. Teyonah Parris plays an adult version of Monica Rambeau, who appeared as a child in Captain Marvel, played by Akira Akbar, while Randall Park and Kat Dennings reprise their MCU roles of Jimmy Woo and Darcy Lewis in the series. Evan Peters appears as Ralph Bohner, a man posing as Wanda's deceased brother Pietro, who was portrayed by Aaron Taylor-Johnson in previous MCU films. This was a nod to Peters' role as Peter Maximoff in 20th Century Fox's X-Men film series. The organization S.W.O.R.D. was introduced in the series, one of the first comic elements previously controlled by Fox to be integrated into the MCU following the acquisition of 21st Century Fox by Disney, while the Darkhold is also featured, after previously appearing in the Marvel Television series Agents of S.H.I.E.L.D. and Runaways with a different design.

=== The Falcon and the Winter Soldier (2021) ===
Sam Wilson teams up with Bucky Barnes on a global mission to stop an anti-patriotism group, the Flag Smashers, who are enhanced with a recreation of the Super Soldier Serum and believe the world was better during the Blip.

By late October 2018, Malcolm Spellman was hired to write and serve as head writer on a limited series starring Anthony Mackie as Sam Wilson / Falcon and Sebastian Stan as Bucky Barnes / Winter Soldier. The series was officially announced and titled in April 2019, with Mackie and Stan confirmed. Filming began in October 2019, in Atlanta, with Kari Skogland directing the series, but was suspended in March 2020 due to the COVID-19 pandemic. Production resumed in early September 2020, and concluded late the next month. The Falcon and the Winter Soldier premiered on March 19, 2021, and ran for six episodes, concluding on April 23, 2021. A feature film, Captain America: Brave New World (2025), starring Mackie as Sam Wilson / Captain America, serves as a continuation of the series, and is part of Phase Five.

The Falcon and the Winter Soldier is set six months after the events of Avengers: Endgame. Georges St-Pierre, Don Cheadle, Daniel Brühl, Emily VanCamp, and Florence Kasumba reprise their respective MCU roles of Georges Batroc, James "Rhodey" Rhodes, Helmut Zemo, Sharon Carter, and Ayo. Julia Louis-Dreyfus appears as Valentina Allegra de Fontaine in the series. Louis-Dreyfus had been expected to first appear in Black Widow before pandemic delays pushed the film's release until after the series.

=== Loki season 1 (2021) ===
After stealing the Tesseract, an alternate version of Loki is brought to the mysterious Time Variance Authority (TVA) to help fix the timeline and stop a greater threat, ending up trapped in a crime thriller of his own making, traveling through time.

By September 2018, Marvel Studios was developing a limited series starring Tom Hiddleston as Loki, which Disney CEO Bob Iger confirmed that November. In February 2019, Michael Waldron was hired as head writer, and Hiddleston was confirmed to reprise his title role. Filming began in February 2020, with Kate Herron directing the series, but was suspended that March due to the COVID-19 pandemic. Production resumed in September 2020 at Pinewood Atlanta Studios, and concluded in early December. The first season of Loki premiered on June 9, 2021, and ran for six episodes, concluding on July 14, 2021. A second season debuted in October 2023, as part of Phase Five.

Loki begins after the 2012 events seen in Avengers: Endgame, but much of the season exists outside of time and space or in different time periods that the characters travel to. The season ties into Doctor Strange in the Multiverse of Madness, and Feige said it would be "tremendously important" and "lay the groundwork" for the future of the MCU. This includes the appearance of Jonathan Majors as He Who Remains, a variant of the character Kang the Conqueror who appears in Ant-Man and the Wasp: Quantumania. Jaimie Alexander makes an uncredited cameo appearance as Sif, reprising her role from previous MCU media, while Thor actor Chris Hemsworth has an uncredited cameo as the voice of Throg, a frog version of Thor.

=== What If...? season 1 (2021) ===
What If...? explores what would happen if major moments from the Marvel Cinematic Universe (MCU) occurred differently, as observed by the Watcher.

By March 2019, Marvel Studios was developing an animated anthology series based on the What If comic book concept to explore how the MCU would be altered if certain events had occurred differently. Jeffrey Wright was revealed to narrate the series as the Watcher that July, with voice recording beginning the next month. Production continued remotely during the COVID-19 pandemic, with on-site work suspended. A. C. Bradley serves as head writer with Bryan Andrews directing. The first season of What If...? premiered on August 11, 2021, and ran for nine episodes, concluding on October 6, 2021. It was produced by Marvel Studios Animation. A second season debuted in December 2023, while the third and final season is scheduled to debut in December 2024, both part of Phase Five.

What If...? is set after the establishment of the multiverse in Loki's first-season finale. Many actors from the films voice their respective characters in the season.

=== Hawkeye (2021) ===
Clint Barton must work together with the young Kate Bishop to confront enemies from his past time as Ronin to get back to his family in time for Christmas.

By April 2019, Marvel Studios was developing a limited series starring Jeremy Renner as Clint Barton / Hawkeye, which would involve Barton passing the mantle of Hawkeye to the character Kate Bishop. At the 2019 San Diego Comic-Con, the series was officially announced with it exploring more of Barton's time as the vigilante Ronin, with Jonathan Igla hired as head writer that September while Hailee Steinfeld was in consideration to portray Bishop. Steinfeld was confirmed as Bishop in early December 2020, when filming began in New York City, with both Rhys Thomas and Bert & Bertie each directing a block of episodes. Shooting also occurred at Trilith Studios in Atlanta, and concluded in late April 2021. Hawkeye premiered on November 24, 2021, and ran for six episodes, concluding on December 22. A spin-off series, Echo, starring Alaqua Cox as Maya Lopez / Echo, released in January 2024, as part of Phase Five.

Hawkeye is set one year after the events of Avengers: Endgame during the 2024 Christmas season, and occurs over the course of about a week. Florence Pugh reprises her role as Yelena Belova / Black Widow from Black Widow, along with Linda Cardellini as Barton's wife Laura from previous MCU films, and Vincent D'Onofrio as Wilson Fisk / Kingpin from Marvel Television's Netflix series Daredevil (2015–2018).

=== Moon Knight (2022) ===
Marc Spector, who has dissociative identity disorder, is drawn into a deadly mystery involving Egyptian gods with his multiple identities, such as Steven Grant.

At the August 2019 D23 Expo, Marvel Studios announced that a series centered on Marc Spector / Moon Knight was in development, with Jeremy Slater hired as head writer that November. In October 2020, Oscar Isaac entered negotiations to portray the title role, and was confirmed to have been cast by January 2021. Filming began in late April 2021 in Budapest, with Mohamed Diab and duo Justin Benson and Aaron Moorhead directing episodes of the series, and concluded in early October in Hungary and Jordan, before moving to Atlanta. Filming wrapped by mid-October. Moon Knight premiered on March 30, 2022, and ran for six episodes, concluding on May 4.

Moon Knight is set after Hawkeye in early 2025.

=== Ms. Marvel (2022) ===
Kamala Khan, a fan of the Avengers, particularly Carol Danvers, struggles to fit in until she gains her own powers.

By the 2019 D23 Expo, Marvel Studios was developing a series centered on Kamala Khan / Ms. Marvel, with Bisha K. Ali hired as head writer. In September 2020, Iman Vellani was cast in the title role. Filming began by early November 2020 at Trilith Studios in Atlanta, with Adil El Arbi and Bilall Fallah (credited as Adil & Bilall), Meera Menon, and Sharmeen Obaid-Chinoy each directing two episodes of the series. Shooting also occurred in New Jersey, and concluded in early May 2021 in Thailand. Ms. Marvel premiered on June 8, 2022, and ran for six episodes, concluding on July 13.

Ms. Marvel is set one to two years after Endgame, and set-up The Marvels (2023), in which Vellani also stars. The Department of Damage Control (DODC) is featured in the series after appearing in the films Spider-Man: Homecoming (2017) and Spider-Man: No Way Home, with Arian Moayed reprising his role as agent P. Cleary from No Way Home. Brie Larson cameos as Carol Danvers / Captain Marvel.

=== She-Hulk: Attorney at Law (2022) ===
Jennifer Walters has a complicated life as a single attorney in her 30s who also becomes the 6-foot-7, green superhero She-Hulk after getting accidentally cross-contaminated with the blood of her cousin Bruce Banner.

At the 2019 D23 Expo, Marvel Studios announced that the series She-Hulk, centered on Jennifer Walters / She-Hulk, was in development, with Jessica Gao hired as head writer that November. In September 2020, Tatiana Maslany was cast in the title role. Filming began in mid-April 2021 in Los Angeles and at Trilith Studios in Atlanta, with Kat Coiro and Anu Valia directing episodes of the series. Filming wrapped by mid-August 2021. The subtitle for the series was added by May 2022. She-Hulk: Attorney at Law premiered on August 18, 2022, and consisted of nine episodes, concluding on October 13.

She-Hulk: Attorney at Law is set "a relatively short amount of time" after Shang-Chi and the Legend of the Ten Rings. Reprising their MCU roles in the series are Mark Ruffalo as Bruce Banner / Hulk, Tim Roth as Emil Blonsky / Abomination, Benedict Wong as Wong, and Charlie Cox as Matt Murdock / Daredevil.

== Television specials ==
Both specials in Phase Four were released on Disney+ and marketed as "Marvel Studios Special Presentations".

Phase Four television specials
Special	Release date	Director	Writer(s)
Werewolf by Night	October 7, 2022	Michael Giacchino	Heather Quinn and Peter Cameron
The Guardians of the Galaxy Holiday Special	November 25, 2022	James Gunn	

=== Werewolf by Night (2022) ===
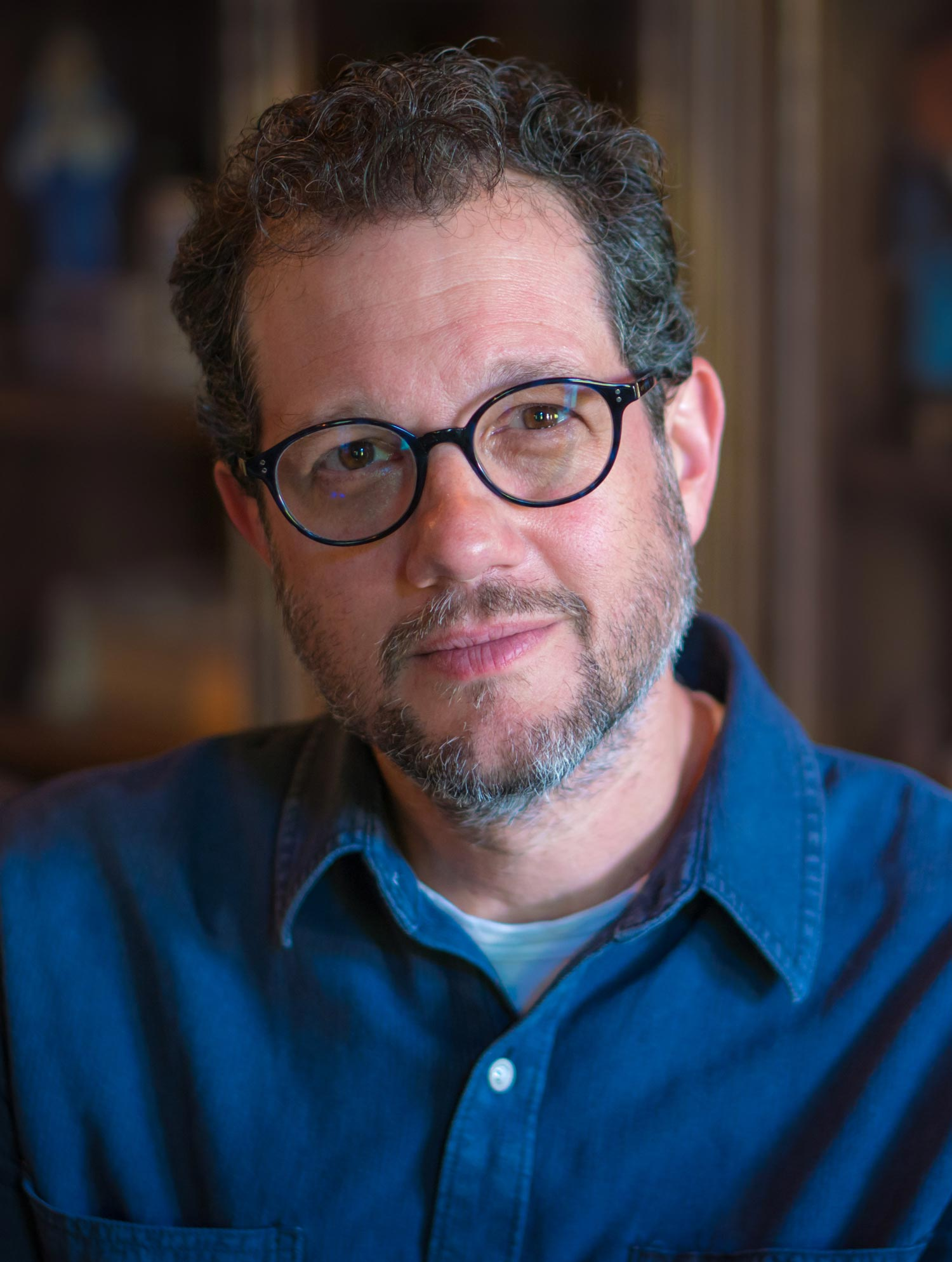
Michael Giacchino, the director of Werewolf by Night and a frequent composer of MCU films

A secret group of monster hunters gather at Bloodstone Castle following the death of their leader and engage in a mysterious and deadly competition for a powerful relic, which will bring them face to face with a dangerous monster.

By August 2021, Marvel Studios was developing a Halloween-themed television special for Disney+ that was reportedly centered on Werewolf by Night. Gael García Bernal was cast in the lead role for the special in November, starring as the Jack Russell version of the character. Filming began in late March 2022 at Trilith Studios in Atlanta, Georgia, with Michael Giacchino directing the special, and Heather Quinn and Peter Cameron co-writing the screenplay, and concluded by late April 2022. It was formally announced as Werewolf by Night in September 2022, and released on October 7, 2022.

Werewolf by Night exists within the MCU but does not state "when, how or why". Giacchino has "a very specific idea" of how the special fits into the MCU that had not been discussed with Marvel Studios.

=== The Guardians of the Galaxy Holiday Special (2022) ===
The Guardians of the Galaxy celebrate Christmas and set out to Earth to find Peter Quill the best present.

In December 2020, Marvel Studios announced that James Gunn would write and direct a new television special featuring the Guardians of the Galaxy, with the main cast returning. Filming began by February 2022 at Trilith Studios in Atlanta, and concluded in late April 2022, during the production of Guardians of the Galaxy Vol. 3 (2023). Shooting also occurred in Los Angeles. The Guardians of the Galaxy Holiday Special was released on November 25, 2022.

The Guardians of the Galaxy Holiday Special is set "a fairly long time" after the Guardians parting ways with Thor as seen in Thor: Love and Thunder, and before the events of Guardians of the Galaxy Vol. 3. The Holiday Special allowed Gunn to introduce important elements to Vol. 3 that he then would not need to explain at the beginning of that film.

== Shorts ==
=== I Am Groot season 1 (2022) ===
Series	Season	Episodes	Originally released		Writer and director
Series	Season	Episodes	First released	Last released	Writer and director
I Am Groot	1	5	August 10, 2022		Kirsten Lepore

Each short follows Baby Groot as he grows up in the galaxy, going on adventures with new and unusual characters that get him into trouble.

Announced in December 2020, I Am Groot is a series of photorealistic animated short films starring Baby Groot for Disney+. Production had begun by August 2021 from Marvel Studios Animation, with Kirsten Lepore serving as director, executive producer, and head writer. Vin Diesel was confirmed to star as the voice of Baby Groot by June 2022. I Am Groot premiered with five shorts on Disney+ on August 10, 2022. The second season, also consisting of five shorts, was released on September 6, 2023, as part of Phase Five.

I Am Groot is set between the end of Guardians of the Galaxy and the start of Guardians of the Galaxy Vol. 2, and the end of Vol. 2 and its mid-credits scene. Cooper reprises his role as Rocket in the series.

== Timeline ==
Marvel Cinematic Universe: Phase Four timeline Full timeline at Marvel Cinematic Universe timeline (Note: Loki and What If...? are excluded from the diagram because they occur outside of the main timeline. Werewolf by Night is also excluded given the special explicitly does not indicate where it takes places in the MCU. Disney+'s timeline order places Loki and What If...? between Avengers: Endgame and WandaVision, and Werewolf by Night after Love and Thunder.) Titles in parentheses are included for reference
2014	(Guardians of the Galaxy)
2014	I Am Groot ep. 1
2014	(Guardians of the Galaxy Vol. 2)
2014	I Am Groot eps. 2–5
2015	
2016	(Civil War)
2016	Black Widow
2017–2022	
2023	(Endgame)
2023	WandaVision
2024	Shang-Chi
2024	The Falcon and the Winter Soldier
2024	Eternals
2024	(Far From Home)
2024	No Way Home
2024	Multiverse of Madness
2024	Hawkeye
2025	Moon Knight
2025	Wakanda Forever
2025	She-Hulk
2025	Ms. Marvel
2025	Love and Thunder
2025	The Guardians of the Galaxy; Holiday Special

Many of the properties in the Phase are set after the events of Avengers: Endgame. WandaVision is set three weeks after the events of that film, with The Falcon and the Winter Soldier set six months after Endgame. Shang-Chi and the Legend of the Ten Rings is also set after Endgame during the days leading to the Qingming Festival in early April, with She-Hulk: Attorney at Law set "a relatively short amount of time" after Shang-Chi. Eternals takes place around the same time as The Falcon and the Winter Soldier and Spider-Man: Far From Home, six to eight months after Endgame in 2024, while Spider-Man: No Way Home begins immediately after Far From Home, and continues over late 2024. Hawkeye takes place one year after the events of Endgame during the 2024 Christmas season, occurring over the course of about a week.

Moon Knight is set after Hawkeye in early 2025, while Multiverse of Madness is set after No Way Home. Ms. Marvel is set after Moon Knight, one to two years after Endgame. Thor: Love and Thunder is also set after Endgame, eight and a half years after Thor broke up with Jane Foster, which had occurred by Thor: Ragnarok, and "a few weeks" since Thor joined the Guardians of the Galaxy. Black Panther: Wakanda Forever is set after the events of No Way Home, "potentially concurrent" with Love and Thunder and Ant-Man and the Wasp: Quantumania, though it was placed earlier in the timeline between Moon Knight and She-Hulk: Attorney at Law with its addition to Disney+. The Guardians of the Galaxy Holiday Special is set "a fairly long time" after the events of Love and Thunder and before the events of Guardians of the Galaxy Vol. 3.

The first season of Loki continues from the 2012 events seen in Endgame, but much of the series exists outside of time and space given the introduction of the TVA. What If...? is set after Loki's first-season finale, exploring the various branching timelines of the newly created multiverse in which major moments from the MCU films occur differently. Black Widow is set between Captain America: Civil War and Avengers: Infinity War (2018), mostly taking place between the main plot of Civil War and its final scene. The I Am Groot shorts are set between the end of Guardians of the Galaxy (2014) and the start of Guardians of the Galaxy Vol. 2 (2017), and the end of Vol. 2 and its mid-credits scene. The special Werewolf by Night exists within the MCU but does not state "when, how or why". The director Michael Giacchino has "a very specific idea" of how the special fits into the MCU that had not been discussed with Marvel Studios.

With the release of Thor: Love and Thunder on Disney+ in September 2022, Thomas Bacon and Molly Jae Weinstein of Screen Rant noted how the film's placement in the timeline order section on the platform seemed incorrect, with Bacon saying it made "no sense" given dialogue and events in the film that contradicted this placement, and also pointing out how Shang-Chi and Moon Knight's placement also ignored dating information given in each. Bacon said, "The MCU's timeline is now complicated by the sheer volume of Marvel films and TV shows currently in production, because even Marvel's key decision-makers don't really know quite what order things will be released." Unlike the earlier phases where each new project was often the next chronological title in the timeline, Phase Four "has hopped around the timeline with impunity", which in turn made it "rather messy". With the release of The Guardians of the Galaxy Holiday Special, Bacon believed its placement on the Disney+ timeline "fixed" Love and Thunder's placement, thinking that film should be placed in late 2024 on the timeline.

== Recurring cast and characters ==
List indicators

This section includes characters who have appeared in multiple Phase Four films or series, and have appeared in the billing block for at least one film or have been a starring cast member for at least one series.

- A dark grey cell indicates the character was not in the film, series, or special.
- A ^{C} indicates an uncredited cameo role.
- A ^{G} indicates a guest appearance in the series.
- A ^{P} indicates an appearance in onscreen photographs.
- A ^{V} indicates a voice-only role.

Characters are listed alphabetically by last name, as applicable.

Recurring cast and characters of Phase Four
Character	Film	Television	Animation
Ayo	Florence Kasumba	Florence Kasumba	
Bruce Banner Hulk	Mark Ruffalo^{C}	Mark Ruffalo	Mark Ruffalo^{G}^{V}
James "Bucky" Barnes Winter Soldier / White Wolf		Sebastian Stan	Sebastian Stan^{G}^{V}
Clint Barton Hawkeye / Ronin	Jeremy Renner^{C}^{P}^{V}	Jeremy Renner	Jeremy Renner^{G}^{V}
Georges Batroc		Georges St-Pierre	Georges St-Pierre^{G}^{V}
Yelena Belova Black Widow	Florence Pugh	Florence Pugh	
Emil Blonsky Abomination	Tim Roth^{C}^{V}	Tim Roth	
Sharon Carter Power Broker		Emily VanCamp	Emily VanCamp^{G}^{V}
P. Cleary	Arian Moayed	Arian Moayed	
Carol Danvers Captain Marvel	Brie Larson^{C}	Brie Larson^{C}	Alexandra Daniels^{G}^{V}
Valentina Allegra de Fontaine	Julia Louis-Dreyfus	Julia Louis-Dreyfus	
Drax the Destroyer	Dave Bautista	Dave Bautista	Fred Tatasciore^{G}^{V}
Jane Foster Mighty Thor	Natalie Portman		Natalie Portman^{G}^{V}
Groot	Vin Diesel^{V}	Vin Diesel^{V}	
Harold "Happy" Hogan	Jon Favreau		Jon Favreau^{G}^{V}
Darcy Lewis	Kat Dennings	Kat Dennings	Kat Dennings^{G}^{V}
Loki		Tom Hiddleston	Tom Hiddleston^{G}^{V}
Mantis	Pom Klementieff	Pom Klementieff	
Wanda Maximoff Scarlet Witch	Elizabeth Olsen	Elizabeth Olsen	
Matt Murdock Daredevil	Charlie Cox	Charlie Cox	
Nebula	Karen Gillan	Karen Gillan	Karen Gillan^{G}^{V}
Kraglin Obfonteri	Sean Gunn		Sean Gunn^{G}^{V}
Okoye	Danai Gurira		Danai Gurira^{G}^{V}
Christine Palmer	Rachel McAdams		Rachel McAdams^{G}^{V}
Peter Parker Spider-Man	Tom Holland		Hudson Thames^{G}^{V}
Peter Quill Star-Lord	Chris Pratt	Chris Pratt	Brian T. Delaney^{G}^{V}
Ramonda	Angela Bassett		Angela Bassett^{G}^{V}
James "Rhodey" Rhodes War Machine		Don Cheadle	Don Cheadle^{G}^{V}
Rocket	Bradley Cooper^{V}	Bradley Cooper^{V}	
Natasha Romanoff Black Widow	Scarlett Johansson		Lake Bell^{G}^{V}
Thaddeus Ross	William Hurt		Mike McGill^{G}^{V}
Shuri Black Panther	Letitia Wright		Ozioma Akagha^{G}^{V}
Sif	Jaimie Alexander	Jaimie Alexander^{C}	Jaimie Alexander^{G}^{V}
Stephen Strange	Benedict Cumberbatch		Benedict Cumberbatch^{G}^{V}
Thor	Chris Hemsworth		Chris Hemsworth^{G}^{V}
Vision		Paul Bettany	Paul Bettany^{G}^{V}
Wong	Benedict Wong	Benedict Wong	Benedict Wong^{G}^{V}

== Music ==
Score albums for Phase Four films
Title	U.S. release date	Length	Composer(s)	Label(s)	Ref.
Black Widow (Original Motion Picture Soundtrack)	July 9, 2021	79:53	Lorne Balfe	Hollywood Records; Marvel Music	
Shang-Chi and the Legend of the Ten Rings (Original Score)	September 1, 2021	68:19	Joel P. West	Hollywood Records; Marvel Music	
Eternals (Original Motion Picture Soundtrack)	November 3, 2021	68:17	Ramin Djawadi	Hollywood Records; Marvel Music	
Spider-Man: No Way Home (Original Motion Picture Soundtrack)	December 17, 2021	73:54	Michael Giacchino	Sony Classical Records	
Doctor Strange in the Multiverse of Madness (Original Motion Picture Soundtrack)	May 4, 2022	61:25	Danny Elfman	Hollywood Records; Marvel Music	
Thor: Love and Thunder (Original Motion Picture Soundtrack)	July 6, 2022	59:03	Michael Giacchino and Nami Melumad	Hollywood Records; Marvel Music	
Black Panther: Wakanda Forever (Original Score)	November 11, 2022	83:00	Ludwig Göransson	Hollywood Records; Marvel Music	

Compilation albums for Phase Four films
Title	U.S. release date	Length	Labels	Ref.
Shang-Chi and the Legend of the Ten Rings: The Album	September 3, 2021	61:37	Hollywood Records; Marvel Music; Interscope Records	
Wakanda Forever Prologue	July 25, 2022	9:33	Hollywood Records; Marvel Music	
Black Panther: Wakanda Forever – Music from and Inspired By	November 4, 2022	66:18	Hollywood Records; Roc Nation; Def Jam Recordings	

Shang-Chi and the Legend of the Ten Rings: The Album includes the original song "Run It" by DJ Snake, while Black Panther: Wakanda Forever features the original song "Lift Me Up" by Rihanna.

Albums for Phase Four series
Series	Title	U.S. release date	Length	Composer(s)	Labels	Ref.
WandaVision	Episode 1 (Original Soundtrack)	January 22, 2021	9:14	Christophe Beck, Kristen Anderson-Lopez, and Robert Lopez	Hollywood Records; Marvel Music	
WandaVision	Episode 2 (Original Soundtrack)	January 22, 2021	7:37	Christophe Beck, Kristen Anderson-Lopez, and Robert Lopez	Hollywood Records; Marvel Music	
WandaVision	Episode 3 (Original Soundtrack)	January 29, 2021	12:31	Christophe Beck, Kristen Anderson-Lopez, and Robert Lopez	Hollywood Records; Marvel Music	
WandaVision	Episode 4 (Original Soundtrack)	February 5, 2021	18:13	Christophe Beck	Hollywood Records; Marvel Music	
WandaVision	Episode 5 (Original Soundtrack)	February 12, 2021	16:19	Christophe Beck, Kristen Anderson-Lopez, and Robert Lopez	Hollywood Records; Marvel Music	
WandaVision	Episode 6 (Original Soundtrack)	February 19, 2021	19:28	Christophe Beck, Kristen Anderson-Lopez, and Robert Lopez	Hollywood Records; Marvel Music	
WandaVision	Episode 7 (Original Soundtrack)	February 23, 2021	18:43	Christophe Beck, Kristen Anderson-Lopez, and Robert Lopez	Hollywood Records; Marvel Music	
WandaVision	Episode 8 (Original Soundtrack)	March 5, 2021	32:15	Christophe Beck	Hollywood Records; Marvel Music	
WandaVision	Episode 9 (Original Soundtrack)	March 12, 2021	36:06	Christophe Beck	Hollywood Records; Marvel Music	
The Falcon and the Winter Soldier	Vol. 1 (Episodes 1–3) (Original Soundtrack)	April 9, 2021	58:54	Henry Jackman	Hollywood Records; Marvel Music	
The Falcon and the Winter Soldier	Vol. 2 (Episodes 4–6) (Original Soundtrack)	April 30, 2021	60:33	Henry Jackman	Hollywood Records; Marvel Music	
Loki season 1	Vol. 1 (Episodes 1–3) (Original Soundtrack)	July 2, 2021	49:33	Natalie Holt	Hollywood Records; Marvel Music	
Loki season 1	Vol. 2 (Episodes 4–6) (Original Soundtrack)	July 23, 2021	66:17	Natalie Holt	Hollywood Records; Marvel Music	
What If...? season 1	Episode 1 (Original Soundtrack)	August 13, 2021	23:48	Laura Karpman	Hollywood Records; Marvel Music	
What If...? season 1	Episode 2 (Original Soundtrack)	August 23, 2021	22:35	Laura Karpman	Hollywood Records; Marvel Music	
What If...? season 1	Episode 3 (Original Soundtrack)	August 27, 2021	25:02	Laura Karpman	Hollywood Records; Marvel Music	
What If...? season 1	Episode 4 (Original Soundtrack)	September 3, 2021	30:09	Laura Karpman	Hollywood Records; Marvel Music	
What If...? season 1	Episode 5 (Original Soundtrack)	September 10, 2021	24:47	Laura Karpman	Hollywood Records; Marvel Music	
What If...? season 1	Episode 6 (Original Soundtrack)	September 17, 2021	20:49	Laura Karpman	Hollywood Records; Marvel Music	
What If...? season 1	Episode 7 (Original Soundtrack)	September 24, 2021	21:40	Laura Karpman	Hollywood Records; Marvel Music	
What If...? season 1	Episode 8 (Original Soundtrack)	October 1, 2021	21:14	Laura Karpman	Hollywood Records; Marvel Music	
What If...? season 1	Episode 9 (Original Soundtrack)	October 8, 2021	30:09	Laura Karpman	Hollywood Records; Marvel Music	
Hawkeye	Vol. 1 (Episodes 1–3) (Original Soundtrack)	December 10, 2021	47:23	Christophe Beck and Michael Paraskevas	Hollywood Records; Marvel Music	
Hawkeye	Vol. 2 (Episodes 4–6) (Original Soundtrack)	December 22, 2021	53:37	Christophe Beck and Michael Paraskevas	Hollywood Records; Marvel Music	
Moon Knight	Original Soundtrack	April 27, 2022	85:22	Hesham Nazih	Hollywood Records; Marvel Music	
Ms. Marvel	Vol. 1 (Episodes 1–3) (Original Soundtrack)	June 22, 2022	49:29	Laura Karpman	Hollywood Records; Marvel Music	
Ms. Marvel	Vol. 2 (Episodes 4–6) (Original Soundtrack)	July 13, 2022	88:29	Laura Karpman	Hollywood Records; Marvel Music	
She-Hulk: Attorney at Law	Vol. 1 (Episodes 1–4) (Original Soundtrack)	September 16, 2022	52:17	Amie Doherty	Hollywood Records; Marvel Music	
She-Hulk: Attorney at Law	Vol. 2 (Episodes 5–9) (Original Soundtrack)	October 18, 2022	62:35	Amie Doherty	Hollywood Records; Marvel Music	

Albums for Phase Four specials
Title	U.S. release date	Length	Composer	Labels	Ref.
Marvel Studios' Werewolf by Night (Original Soundtrack)	October 7, 2022	41:25	Michael Giacchino	Hollywood Records; Marvel Music	
The Guardians of the Galaxy Holiday Special (Original Soundtrack)	November 23, 2022	22:44	John Murphy	Hollywood Records; Marvel Music	

== Marketing ==
In early January 2021, Marvel announced their "Marvel Must Haves" program, which reveals new toys, games, books, apparel, home decor, and other merchandise from Hasbro, Lego, Funko, Her Universe, Loungefly and others based on the episodes of Disney+ series WandaVision, The Falcon and the Winter Soldier, Loki, What If...?, and Hawkeye. The program began on January 18, 2021, with new reveals each Monday until the end of 2021. Paul Gitter, senior vice president of Marvel Licensing called the program "an unprecedented weekly celebration" with products that "authentically celebrate each new episode". The program continued into 2022 with Moon Knight, Ms. Marvel, and She Hulk: Attorney at Law. In May 2022, Marvel Studios, Funko, and Target announced the Marvel Studios Selects program, in which Funko items based on the MCU films and television series would be released monthly exclusively at Target.

QR codes first appeared in Moon Knight that linked viewers to a website to access free digital comics featuring the character that updated weekly. Adam B. Vary of Variety called the initiative "a savvy way to expand viewers' comic book knowledge" for the more obscure character of Moon Knight. Executive producer Grant Curtis explained that he had been fascinated with the engagement the animated series Bob's Burgers had with their gags in the opening and closing credits and their "burger of the week", and believed that interactivity could be brought to Moon Knight to "help educate viewers on Moon Knight's comic book history". He realized that QR codes would be a good way to "organically incorporate... into the environment", and the codes were added into the episodes with CGI by the visual effects team. Curtis was hopeful the project would continue for other MCU films and series. The program continued with Ms. Marvel and She-Hulk: Attorney at Law.

== Home media ==
Home media releases of Phase Four films
Film	Digital release	DVD/Blu-ray release
Black Widow	August 10, 2021	September 14, 2021
Shang-Chi and the Legend of the Ten Rings	November 12, 2021	November 30, 2021
Eternals	January 12, 2022	February 15, 2022
Spider-Man: No Way Home	March 15, 2022	April 12, 2022
Doctor Strange in the Multiverse of Madness	June 22, 2022	July 26, 2022
Thor: Love and Thunder	September 8, 2022	September 27, 2022
Black Panther: Wakanda Forever	February 1, 2023	February 7, 2023

Home media releases of Phase Four television series
Television series	Blu-ray/Ultra-HD Blu-ray release
WandaVision	November 28, 2023
The Falcon and the Winter Soldier	April 30, 2024
Loki season 1	September 26, 2023
Hawkeye	December 3, 2024
Moon Knight	April 30, 2024

In June 2021, Matt Mitovich of TVLine reported that there were no plans at that time to release the Disney+ series on physical media. In August 2023, Walt Disney Studios Home Entertainment announced Ultra HD Blu-ray and Blu-ray releases of some of their Marvel and Star Wars Disney+ series, starting with WandaVision and the first season of Loki.

== Reception ==
=== Box office performance ===
Box office performance of Phase Four films
Film	U.S. release date	Box office gross			All-time ranking		Budget	Ref.
Film	U.S. release date	U.S. and Canada	Other territories	Worldwide	U.S. and Canada	Worldwide	Budget	Ref.
Black Widow	July 9, 2021	$183,651,655	$196,100,000	$379,751,655 (Note: Disney announced that Black Widow also earned $67 million globally from Disney+ Premier Access in its opening weekend.)	290	409	$289 million	
Shang-Chi and the Legend of the Ten Rings	September 3, 2021	$224,543,292	$207,700,000	$432,243,292	193	331	$150–200 million	
Eternals	November 5, 2021	$164,870,234	$237,194,665	$402,064,899	370	377	$236.2 million	
Spider-Man: No Way Home	December 17, 2021	$814,866,759	$1,113,174,146	$1,928,040,905	3	7	$200 million	
Doctor Strange in the Multiverse of Madness	May 6, 2022	$411,331,607	$544,444,197	$955,775,804	44	68	$351 million	
Thor: Love and Thunder	July 8, 2022	$343,256,830	$417,671,251	$760,928,081	77	123	$250 million	
Black Panther: Wakanda Forever	November 11, 2022	$453,829,060	$405,379,776	$859,208,836	30	93	$250 million	
Total		$2,595,597,748	$3,116,221,930	$5,711,819,678	–	–	$1.46–1.54 billion	

=== Critical and public response ===
Critical and public response of Phase Four films
Film	Critical		Public	
Film	Rotten Tomatoes	Metacritic	CinemaScore	PostTrak
Black Widow	79% (463 reviews)	68 (58 reviews)	A−	88%
Shang-Chi and the Legend of the Ten Rings	92% (344 reviews)	71 (52 reviews)	A	91%
Eternals	48% (416 reviews)	52 (62 reviews)	B	78%
Spider-Man: No Way Home	93% (429 reviews)	71 (60 reviews)	A+	96%
Doctor Strange in the Multiverse of Madness	73% (464 reviews)	60 (65 reviews)	B+	82%
Thor: Love and Thunder	64% (448 reviews)	57 (64 reviews)	B+	77%
Black Panther: Wakanda Forever	84% (450 reviews)	67 (62 reviews)	A	93%

Critical response of Phase Four television series
Title	Season	Rotten Tomatoes	Metacritic
WandaVision	–	92% (428 reviews)	77 (43 reviews)
The Falcon and the Winter Soldier	–	85% (336 reviews)	74 (32 reviews)
Loki	1	92% (340 reviews)	74 (32 reviews)
What If...?	1	89% (123 reviews)	69 (16 reviews)
Hawkeye	–	92% (176 reviews)	66 (27 reviews)
Moon Knight	–	86% (250 reviews)	69 (27 reviews)
Ms. Marvel	–	98% (311 reviews)	78 (23 reviews)
She-Hulk: Attorney at Law	–	80% (611 reviews)	67 (26 reviews)

Critical response of Phase Four television specials
Special	Rotten Tomatoes	Metacritic
Werewolf by Night	90% (113 reviews)	69 (17 reviews)
The Guardians of the Galaxy Holiday Special	95% (64 reviews)	80 (9 reviews)

Ahead of WandaVision premiering to start the phase, Julia Alexander at The Verge wondered if Marvel Studios would be oversaturating their content, saying that having essentially "a new Marvel thing each week [in 2021] is either a blessing or a curse" depending on how viewers felt about the MCU. While Alexander felt franchise fatigue was possible, she said Marvel Studios and Disney's biggest concern was losing trust from the fanbase, pointing to the Star Wars sequel trilogy (2015–2019) as an example of a large portion of fans not being pleased with the quality of the content. Alexander was encouraged by the fact that Feige was leading development of the Disney+ series, unlike the past Marvel television series that were led by Marvel Television's Jeph Loeb, and she felt the studio "just needs to keep doing what it's already doing" and give the "same level of attention" to extending the overarching story from the past films to the Disney+ series. With The Falcon and the Winter Soldier being described as a "six-hour movie", Christian Holub of Entertainment Weekly noted that this led to the series simultaneously "try[ing] to do too much and too little at once" and hoped future Disney+ series would be structured more like television episodes as WandaVision was, even if they did not employ the meta quality that series did with the format.

Deadline Hollywood's Anthony D'Alessandro, writing after audiences polled by CinemaScore gave Eternals a "B" and Doctor Strange in the Multiverse of Madness a "B+" (two of the lowest CinemaScores for MCU films), said this should be a "splash of cold water in Marvel's face". He discussed some fan concerns that Phase Four was not as cohesive as the projects in the first three MCU phases, with most of those films building towards the Infinity Saga storyline, and felt that this was impacting on the box office of the new films. He suggested that Marvel Studios "regroup, re-think and get these movies back on track". Meredith Loftus of Collider agreed that Phase Four felt "disjointed" by the release of Multiverse of Madness, stating that each project was "complex and challenging, exploring themes of grief, mental illness, and family trauma... [but] what's made Phase Four so strong is also its weakness—while we're getting to deepen new and old characters alike, the expansive universe these characters live in feels isolated". She highlighted Moon Knight's lack of connections to the rest of the MCU, and discussed how Doctor Strange in the Multiverse of Madness did not address the events of Loki and Spider-Man: No Way Home as some had expected. Loftus concluded, "Maybe this is a lesson in audience expectations, but when a studio has built a cinematic universe off the back of each movie with a through-line story for over a decade, the lack of one in Phase Four makes it feel incomplete." James Whitbrook of Gizmodo also noted the lack of a singular threat for each of the phase's projects, like Thanos in the Infinity Saga, and said the multiverse storyline was the closest the phase had got to a "unifying build-up". He added that "this sense of aimlessness feels odd to an audience that has, over a decade, been trained to connect the dots and see how each of Marvel's releases connects to the others", with the films and Disney+ series "rarely [feeling] like they're in conversation with each other". Writing for Variety, Adam B. Vary agreed that "there is no sense yet of where Phase Four is heading—if, indeed, it is heading in any single direction", but he felt this could be "a feature, not a bug", explaining, "With the explosion of MCU content on Disney+, there may be simply too many titles to hold together into one consolidated storyline". He did note that the multiverse plays a significant role in Loki, What If...?, Spider-Man: No Way Home, and Doctor Strange in the Multiverse of Madness, that potential "Big Bads" had been introduced, including Kang, Valentina Allegra de Fontaine, Arishem, and Wilson Fisk / Kingpin, and that the phase could be building to an unannounced Young Avengers film or series since members of that team from the comics had been appearing in many Phase Four projects. Journalists Joanna Robinson and Eric Goldman responded in support of Vary's article, with Robinson adding that, despite what some fans believed, the Infinity Saga was not completely planned out and instead was made cohesive by "luck and cleverness". Goldman felt that some of this was fans retroactively treating each Infinity Saga film as having more importance to the overall storyline than they did when first released, and he said the same could happen to the Phase Four films once more was known about their connections to the next storyline.

Matthew Belloni, a former editor for The Hollywood Reporter and a writer for Puck News, and Sean Fennessey of The Ringer, discussed whether the MCU films and series were in a decline. Belloni noted how Marvel have "taken really idiosyncratic filmmakers in Chloé Zhao and Sam Raimi and tried to plug them into this formula, but given them a little bit more freedom" than previous MCU directors had for their films, and questioned whether this was a "mistake to stray too much from the Marvel formula?", and if this approach to "do it the same, but different" while still making it feel fresh and familiar for the audience would be necessary for the franchise to succeed going forward. Fennessey believed Marvel did not stray too much with these filmmakers, citing Marvel's history of hiring filmmakers with distinct tones and perspectives and being able to "blend [their] vision" with it, but felt the tone of Zhao's previous films did not "[make] any sense for a Marvel movie" or match Marvel's prior storytelling, and that Raimi's history with Marvel and his background making horror films was an attempt "to plug the dam" after Derrickson left as the Multiverse of Madness director, and that his hiring was "like a marriage of convenience and friendship, more so than like a bold choice to choose an unusual filmmaker". Fennessey said Eternals felt "fully disconnected" from the MCU's prior stories and that its more cosmic direction could lead toward future stories, but believed its "ill fit" and "very strange" choices behind the scenes made it look bad, and that the film was "more egregious" than Multiverse of Madness. Belloni compared the MCU's increasing output to Pixar when it began producing more animated films and said that experiencing a "drop-off in quality" was "the cost of doing business if you want to produce films at scale", but felt there was not a "huge cause for alarm at Marvel just yet". Belloni later said that Marvel needed "to figure out how to generate Avenger-level interest from non-Avenger properties", and that the then-forthcoming releases of Marvel's next Disney+ series Ms. Marvel and She-Hulk: Attorney at Law would be "another big test for fans", but did not feel Marvel's series output was in trouble at that time.

Benedict Wong appears as Wong in many of the Phase Four projects, which resulted in Feige jokingly referring to the franchise as becoming the "Wong Cinematic Universe"; this was also used by many on the internet. These appearances were likened to those of Phil Coulson, a character who appeared in many of the Phase One films.

=== Accolades ===
The films of Phase Four were nominated for seven Academy Awards, twelve MTV Movie & TV Awards (winning three), and nine Visual Effects Society Awards (winning one), among others. The television series' of the phase have been nominated for 14 Critics' Choice Super Awards (winning four), three Golden Reel Awards, among others.

== Tie-in media ==
=== Marvel Studios: Legends season 1 (2021–2022) ===
Announced in December 2020, this series examines individual heroes, villains, moments, and objects from the Marvel Cinematic Universe and how they connect, in anticipation of the upcoming stories that would feature them in Phase Four. The first season of Marvel Studios: Legends premiered on Disney+ on January 8, 2021, with the release of the first two episodes. Episodes highlighted Wanda Maximoff, Vision, Falcon, Winter Soldier, Zemo, Sharon Carter, Loki, the Tesseract, Black Widow, Peggy Carter, the Avengers Initiative, the Ravagers, the Ten Rings, Hawkeye, Doctor Strange, Wong, Wanda Maximoff / Scarlet Witch, Thor, Jane Foster, Valkyrie, Bruce Banner, T'Challa, Shuri, the Dora Milaje, Drax, and Mantis, ahead of their appearances in Disney+ series, specials, and the films. The Drax and Mantis episodes were removed shortly after they released, as they revealed a plot detail relevant to The Guardians of the Galaxy Holiday Special, but were both later restored. The Legends episodes continued in Phase Five, which began the second season.

=== Marvel Studios: Assembled (2021–2023) ===
Announced in February 2021, each special of the documentary series goes behind the scenes of the making of the MCU films and television series with cast members and additional creatives. Marvel Studios: Assembled premiered on Disney+ on March 12, 2021, with a special for WandaVision, followed by additional specials for The Falcon and the Winter Soldier, the first season of Loki, Black Widow, the first season of What If...?, Shang-Chi and the Legend of the Ten Rings, Hawkeye, Eternals, Moon Knight, Doctor Strange in the Multiverse of Madness, Ms. Marvel, Thor: Love and Thunder, She-Hulk: Attorney at Law, and Black Panther: Wakanda Forever. The Assembled specials continued in Phase Five.

An independent, similar documentary special for Werewolf by Night, titled Director by Night, was also released on Disney+ on November 4, 2022, marketed with the "Marvel Studios Special Presentation" branding.

=== Comic books ===
Tie-in comics of Phase Four
Title	No. of issues	Publication date		Writer(s)	Artist(s)
Title	No. of issues	First published	Last published	Writer(s)	Artist(s)
Marvel's Black Widow Prelude	2	January 15, 2020	February 19, 2020	Peter David	C.F. Villa
Eternals: The 500 Year War	7	January 12, 2022		Dan Abnett, Aki Yanagi, Jongmin Shin, Ju-Yeon Park, David Macho, Rafael Scavone, and Yifan Jiang	Geoffo, Matt Milla, Joe Sabino, Rickie Yagawa, Carlos Macias, Do Gyun Kim, Fernando Sifuentes, Magda Price, Pete Pantazis, Marcio Fiorito, Felipe Sobreiro, and Gunji
