= Marvel's Special Presentations =

Television specials produced by Marvel Studios

- Also known as: Marvel Studios Special Presentations; Marvel Television Special Presentations
- Genre: Superhero
- Based on: Characters published by Marvel Comics
- Country of origin: United States
- Original language: English
- No. of specials: 3

Production
- Executive producers: Kevin Feige; Louis D'Esposito; Victoria Alonso; Brad Winderbaum
- Production companies: Marvel Studios; Marvel Television

Original release
- Network: Disney+
- Release: October 7, 2022 – present

Related
- List of Marvel Cinematic Universe television series

Marvel Cinematic Universe Phases
- The Infinity Saga; Phase One (2008–2012); Phase Two (2013–2015); Phase Three (2016–2019)
- The Multiverse Saga; Phase Four (2021–2022); Phase Five (2023–2025); Phase Six (2025–2027)

Marvel's Special Presentations are a series of television specials produced by Marvel Studios for Disney+, set within the Marvel Cinematic Universe (MCU), sharing continuity with the franchise's films and television series. The Special Presentation banner was revealed alongside the announcement of the first special, Werewolf by Night (2022), in September 2022. The approximately hour-long specials were envisioned to provide a short look at new characters or concepts to the MCU. The Special Presentations are accompanied by an opening logo and fanfare reminiscent of the CBS Special Presentation intro from the 1980s and 1990s.

Werewolf by Night and The Guardians of the Galaxy Holiday Special (2022) are included in Phase Four of the MCU, both of which are holiday-themed and were released as Marvel Studios Special Presentations. Marvel Studios was open to making additional specials, and by February 2025 had begun developing The Punisher: One Last Kill with Jon Bernthal. It is focused on his character, Frank Castle / Punisher, and was released in 2026 as part of Phase Six. One Last Kill was produced by Marvel Studios under its Marvel Television label and released as a Marvel Television Special Presentation. The Special Presentation format has been praised for allowing Marvel Studios to tell contained stories that experiment with genre and style while not being beholden to long-form storytelling, as with their films and television series.

== Development ==
By September 2018, Marvel Studios was developing several limited series for Disney's new streaming service Disney+, to be centered on "second tier" characters from the Marvel Cinematic Universe (MCU) films who had not and were unlikely to star in their own films. Developing content for Disney+ allowed Marvel Studios to be flexible with formats, such as emulating one-off or annual holiday-themed television specials like A Charlie Brown Christmas (1965) and Frosty the Snowman (1969); those specials were usually 30 minutes to an hour, which was the length Marvel Studios was envisioning for their specials.

In December 2020, Marvel Studios announced The Guardians of the Galaxy Holiday Special for Disney+, to be released in late 2022, during the holiday season. The Holiday Special was the first piece of content Marvel Studios planned to create for Disney+. By August 2021, a Halloween-themed television special for Disney+ was in development, reportedly centered on Werewolf by Night. At the D23 Expo in September 2022, Marvel confirmed the Halloween special as Werewolf by Night, which was released in October. At that time, the Special Presentation banner was revealed, under which Werewolf by Night and The Guardians of the Galaxy Holiday Special would be released as "Marvel Studios Special Presentations". Marvel Studios executive Brian Gay called the Special Presentations a "new format" for the studio, with each special meant to be a short look at "either a different story or a different area of the universe", such as introducing new characters or concepts to the MCU, and teasing how they could further integrate into the MCU with future appearances.

Michael Giacchino, the director of Werewolf by Night, said Marvel Studios president Kevin Feige was hopeful that Werewolf by Night would be "the first of a few one-and-done stories". By the release of Werewolf by Night, Marvel Studios had not determined any set release plan for potential future specials. In March 2023, journalist Jeff Sneider reported that a special centered on Mephisto was being filmed during the production of the Disney+ series Agatha All Along (2024). Sacha Baron Cohen was expected to reprise the role, after appearing as the character in the Disney+ series Ironheart (2025). In May 2024, Marvel Studios revealed that its live-action Disney+ series would be released under a new "Marvel Television" banner, separate from the previous company of the same name; this followed changes that the studio made to its television approach, moving towards a more traditional model, which were revealed in October 2023. Feige said in July 2024 that an additional special was in development that was planned to be released after 2025, and Marvel Studios' head of streaming, television, and animation Brad Winderbaum confirmed in September that more specials would be developed. In February 2025, a Special Presentation centered on Frank Castle / Punisher was announced to be in development with Jon Bernthal reprising the role as well as co-writing the special; The Punisher: One Last Kill was released in May 2026 as a "Marvel Television Special Presentation".

== Logo and fanfare ==
External videos
- Official Marvel Studios Special Presentation Animation by Perception presents the specials' opening fanfare, YouTube video from Perception's channel

Special Presentations feature a special multicolored intro with bongo drum music, reminiscent of the CBS Special Presentation theme featured before animated holiday specials of the 1980s and 1990s. Giacchino, who also composed for Werewolf by Night, composed the fanfare and called it a "love letter" to the broadcast networks' special presentation logos, which were used to indicate unique programming which is what Marvel Studios wanted the Special Presentations to be as well. The intro was designed by Perception.

Jamie Lovett at ComicBook.com called the Special Presentation intro "more colorful" and its fanfare "more playful" than the normal Marvel Studios intro, while Rachel Paige from Marvel.com called the fanfare "an absolute bop, and one sure to elicit that same level of excitement" when heard as the broadcast networks' special presentations did. Comic Book Resources's Joshua M. Patton believed this intro would "have a similar effect on new generations of kids" as the older broadcast networks' introductions did, since it "evoke[s] the memory of its CBS counterpart" and signaled to viewers they were "about to see something exciting and new".

== Specials ==
Each special was released on Disney+ and exists alongside the films and television series of their respective phase.

=== Phase Four ===
Phase Four television specials
Special	Release date	Director	Writer(s)
Werewolf by Night	October 7, 2022	Michael Giacchino	Heather Quinn and Peter Cameron
The Guardians of the Galaxy Holiday Special	November 25, 2022	James Gunn	

=== Phase Six ===
Phase Six television special
Special	Release date	Director	Writers
The Punisher: One Last Kill	May 12, 2026	Reinaldo Marcus Green	Jon Bernthal & Reinaldo Marcus Green

== Cast and characters ==
List indicators
This section includes starring cast members, recurring characters, and notable guest stars, as defined by the FAQ.
- A dark grey cell indicates the character was not in the special.
- A ^{C} indicates an uncredited cameo role.
- An ^{F} indicates the character appears in a film.
- An ^{MC} indicates a motion-capture-only role.
- An ^{S} indicates the actor was part of the starring cast for the special.
- A ^{V} indicates a voice-only role.

Character	2022		2026
Character	Werewolf by Night	The Guardians of the Galaxy Holiday Special	The Punisher: One Last Kill
Introduced in films
Cosmo the Spacedog		Maria Bakalova^{V}	
Drax the Destroyer		Dave Bautista^{S}	
Groot		Vin Diesel^{V} ^{S}	
Mantis		Pom Klementieff^{S}	
Nebula		Karen Gillan^{S}	
Kraglin Obfonteri		Sean Gunn^{S}	
Peter Quill Star-Lord		Chris Pratt^{S}	
Rocket		Bradley Cooper^{V} ^{S}	
Yondu Udonta		Michael Rooker^{V} ^{S}	
Steemie Blueliver		Stephen Blackehart	
Introduced in Marvel Television series
Frank Castle Punisher			Jon Bernthal^{S}
Frank Castle Jr.			Eduardo Campirano
Lisa Castle			Addie Bernthal
Maria Castle			Kelli Barrett
Curtis Hoyle			Jason R. Moore^{S}
Karen Page			Deborah Ann Woll^{S}
Introduced in Werewolf by Night
Azarel	Eugenie Bondurant		
Barasso	Daniel J. Watts		
Elsa Bloodstone	Laura Donnelly^{S}		
Ulysses Bloodstone	Richard Dixon^{V}		
Verussa Bloodstone	Harriet Sansom Harris^{S}		
Jovan	Kirk R. Thatcher		
Liorn	Leonardo Nam		
Jack Russell Werewolf by Night	Gael García Bernal^{S}		
Billy Swan	Al Hamacher		
Ted Man-Thing	Carey Jones^{MC} Jeffrey Ford^{V}		
Introduced in The Guardians of the Galaxy Holiday Special
Kevin Bacon		Himself^{S}	
Bzermikitokolok^{F}		Rhett Miller^{S}	
Kortolbookalia		Murry Hammond^{S}	
Phloko		Philip Peeples^{S}	
Kyra Sedgwick		Herself^{C} ^{V}	
Sliyavastojoo		Ken Bethea^{S}	
Introduced in The Punisher: One Last Kill
Benny Gnucci			Dominick Mancino
Bobby Gnucci			Joseph Devito
Carlo Gnucci			David Manuele
Eddie Gnucci Jr.			Henry Corvino
Ma Gnucci			Judith Light^{S}

== Music ==
Albums for Phase Four specials
Title	U.S. release date	Length	Composer	Labels	Ref.
Marvel Studios' Werewolf by Night (Original Soundtrack)	October 7, 2022	41:25	Michael Giacchino	Hollywood Records; Marvel Music	
The Guardians of the Galaxy Holiday Special (Original Soundtrack)	November 23, 2022	22:44	John Murphy	Hollywood Records; Marvel Music	

Albums for Phase Six specials
Title	U.S. release date	Length	Composer	Labels	Ref.
The Punisher: One Last Kill (Original Soundtrack)	May 15, 2026	24:22	Kris Bowers	Hollywood Records; Marvel Music	

== Reception ==
Critical response of Marvel's Special Presentations
Special	Rotten Tomatoes	Metacritic
Werewolf by Night	90% (113 reviews)	69 (17 reviews)
The Guardians of the Galaxy Holiday Special	95% (64 reviews)	80 (9 reviews)
The Punisher: One Last Kill	73% (75 reviews)	63 (15 reviews)

Following the release of Werewolf by Night, Tyler Llewyn Taing of /Film said the Special Presentations could "lead to more exciting genre and stylistic experiments in the MCU down the line" as Werewolf by Night was, and likened the hour-long television special format to Marvel Studios' One-Shot short films. As part of his Werewolf by Night review, Chris E. Hayner at GameSpot said the specials "should become a regular occurrence" if they could be as good as Werewolf by Night was. Rupesh Nair at IGN India compared the special format to one-shot comics and to DC Comics's Elseworlds publications, stating the Special Presentations have "elevated" the MCU and could be the franchise's "critical darings". He hoped future specials would be able to introduce unknown characters to audiences through stories that "allows directors and cast members to shine". Richard Newby of The Hollywood Reporter felt the format was "[the] MCU's most exciting prospect", stating that it was "a good idea [to] reduce the number of series, if not movies, and rethink them as Special Presentations, rather than six-to-nine-week commitments... [to] free up audiences and renew their investment in the universe, and allow filmmakers to stretch themselves creatively."

== Documentary ==
A documentary special for Werewolf by Night, titled Director by Night, was announced in September 2022, with Anthony Giacchino serving as writer and director. Director by Night was released on Disney+ on November 4, 2022, under the "Marvel Studios Special Presentation" branding.

== See also ==
- List of Marvel Cinematic Universe television series (Marvel Studios)
- Marvel One-Shots, short films by Marvel Studios
