= Rolling Home =

Rolling Home may refer to:

- Rolling Home (1926 film), an American silent film comedy
- Rolling Home (1935 film), a British comedy film
- Rolling Home (1946 film), an American film directed by William Berke
- Rolling Home: A Cross Canada Railroad Memoir, a 2001 memoir by Tom Allen
- "Rolling Home" (song), a 1995 song by Rednex
- "Rolling Home", an 1858 song by Charles Mackay adapted into an 1870s sea shanty about Hamburg
- "Rolling Home", a 1967 song by Peter, Paul & Mary from Album 1700
- "Rolling Home", a 1976 song by Status Quo from Blue for You
- "Rollin' Home", a 1986 song by Status Quo from In the Army Now
- "Rollin' Home", a 1934 song by the Charlie Davis Orchestra
