= Werewolf by Night (TV special) =

2022 Marvel Studios television special

- Release poster
- Genre: Horror; Superhero
- Based on: Marvel Comics
- Teleplay by: Heather Quinn; Peter Cameron
- Story by: Heather Quinn
- Directed by: Michael Giacchino
- Starring: Gael García Bernal; Laura Donnelly; Harriet Sansom Harris
- Music by: Michael Giacchino
- Country of origin: United States
- Original language: English

Production
- Executive producers: Kevin Feige; Stephen Broussard; Louis D'Esposito; Victoria Alonso; Brad Winderbaum
- Producer: Leeann Stonebreaker
- Production location: Atlanta, Georgia
- Cinematography: Zoë White
- Editor: Jeffrey Ford
- Running time: 53 minutes
- Production company: Marvel Studios

Original release
- Network: Disney+
- Release: October 7, 2022

Related
- Marvel's Special Presentations

Werewolf by Night is an American television special directed by Michael Giacchino and written by Heather Quinn and Peter Cameron for the streaming service Disney+, based on the Marvel Comics featuring the character Werewolf by Night. It is the first Special Presentation in the Marvel Cinematic Universe (MCU), sharing continuity with the films and television series of the franchise. The special was produced by Marvel Studios and follows a secret group of monster hunters as they compete for a powerful relic while going up against a dangerous monster.

Gael García Bernal stars in the special as Jack Russell / Werewolf by Night, along with Laura Donnelly and Harriet Sansom Harris. Development of the special had begun by August 2021, with Bernal cast that November. Giacchino was revealed to be directing in March 2022, ahead of the start of filming later that month at Trilith Studios in Atlanta, Georgia, concluding in late April. The special was formally announced in September, when Giacchino revealed he was also composing.

Werewolf by Night was released on October 7, 2022, as part of Phase Four of the MCU. The special received positive reviews from critics, with praise for its use of practical effects, the black-and-white cinematography, performances (particularly Bernal and Donnelly), Giacchino's direction and score, and its story, with many noting its departure from previous MCU media. A fully colored version of the special, known as Werewolf by Night in Color, was released on October 20, 2023.

== Plot ==
Following the death of Ulysses Bloodstone, five experienced monster hunters, including Jack Russell, are summoned by Ulysses' widow, Verussa, to Bloodstone Manor, where they are instructed to participate in a competitive hunt to determine their new leader, who will wield the powerful Bloodstone. Ulysses' estranged daughter Elsa also arrives to compete for the Bloodstone, despite Verussa warning her against doing so.

The hunt begins in a large maze on the grounds of the manor, with a captured monster that has been implanted with the Bloodstone as the hunters' quarry. Following a brief encounter with Elsa, Russell finds the monster, "Ted", who is revealed to be a friend that Russell was searching for and actually intended to rescue, while Elsa fights and kills one of the other hunters. Russell leaves Ted to carry out his escape plan, and once again stumbles upon Elsa while she is hiding in a mausoleum. The two agree to work together to free Ted and obtain the Bloodstone for Elsa, who has become disillusioned with her father's monster hunting legacy. Ted kills another of the hunters and Russell destroys the outer wall of the maze so they can escape. Ted flees into the forest after Elsa removes the Bloodstone from him. However, the Bloodstone reacts violently to Russell's touch, indicating that he is also a monster, as Verussa and the remaining hunters arrive.

Verussa captures Russell and Elsa, places them in a cage, and uses the Bloodstone to trigger Russell's transformation into his werewolf form. Instead of killing Elsa as Verussa intended, the werewolf escapes the cage and slaughters Verussa's guards, but Verussa subdues him using the Bloodstone. Elsa also escapes, kills the two remaining hunters, and stops Verussa from killing the werewolf. As she attempts to approach him, the werewolf attacks Elsa, but spares her upon recognizing her and leaves the manor. A furious Verussa tries to shoot Elsa, but is incinerated by Ted, who then leaves to find Russell while Elsa takes possession of the manor and the Bloodstone. The next day, Russell awakens in the forest in his human form with Ted watching over him, and is pleased to learn that Elsa is safe.

== Cast ==
- Gael García Bernal as Jack Russell / Werewolf by Night:
  A monster hunter who has been afflicted with a curse that turns him into a werewolf. Bernal was intrigued by "the idea of the whole tapestry of a life" for Russell and what turning into a werewolf meant for him. To prepare for the role, Bernal read about werewolf mythology and half-human creatures from various cultures around the world, as well as reading comics featuring the character and watching older horror films. It initially took Bernal four hours to get into the werewolf costume and make-up, with the timing becoming "quite fast" by the end of filming. For the werewolf's make-up, Giacchino called it "incredibly important" that Russell, who Giacchino felt had lived for a long time and has outlived his family, had some connection to his history and family and a way to be reminded "of who he was and where he came from, and what was important".
- Laura Donnelly as Elsa Bloodstone:
  Ulysses Bloodstone's estranged daughter who dislikes her family's tradition of hunting monsters. Donnelly was drawn to the character's fighting capability and being able to do the stunt work associated with her action scenes. Director Michael Giacchino did not want the MCU version of the character to be hyper-sexualized like the comics version is, nor to have her wield guns. He continued, "I wanted her to be badass, of course, but I wanted her to be smart, I wanted her to be vulnerable, I just wanted her to be a real person", which he believed Donnelly embodied "in spades".
- Harriet Sansom Harris as Verussa Bloodstone:
  Ulysses's widow and Elsa's stepmother who leads the secret group of monster hunters with almost fanatical devotion and openly despises Elsa. Harris said Verussa was "very interested in control" and with Ulysses's death, is able to enter into a more prominent and powerful role.

Also appearing as the additional monster hunters are Kirk R. Thatcher as Jovan, Eugenie Bondurant as Azarel, Leonardo Nam as Liorn, and Daniel J. Watts as Barasso. Al Hamacher appears as Billy Swan, the Bloodstones' servant; Carey Jones provides the motion-capture of the swamp creature Ted / Man-Thing, with the special's editor Jeffrey Ford providing additional vocalizations; David Silverman appears as the flaming tuba player; Rick Wasserman narrates the special's opening sequence; and Richard Dixon voices Ulysses Bloodstone, Elsa's deceased monster-hunting father who originally wielded the Bloodstone and has become a talking corpse. Erik Beck was a puppeteer on the special.

== Production ==
=== Development ===
The Marvel Comics character Werewolf by Night was planned for a feature film by May 2001, to be licensed from Marvel Studios and distributed by Dimension Films, with a story developed by Marvel Studios' Avi Arad, Kevin Feige, and Ari Arad. Hans Rodionoff was writing the script by June 2002 following several drafts by John Fasano, and Crystal Sky Pictures was set to co-produce the film. By February 2003, Robert Nelson Jacobs was writing the film, with Steven Paul and Patrick Ewald producing for Crystal Sky alongside Brad Weston and Nick Phillips for Dimension Films. In early March 2004, the project was advertised at the American Film Market for distribution, and by November, Crystal Sky was preparing to shoot the film in the United Kingdom over the following six months. The next November, Crystal Sky was planning to announce a director and cast shortly, and start filming in 2006, but this did not materialize. Marvel Studios had intended to use the character in a Marvel Cinematic Universe (MCU) project as early as February 2019, when Kevin Smith was informed that he could not feature Werewolf by Night in his then-planned Marvel Television animated Howard the Duck series due to Marvel Studios' own plans. Additionally, Howard the Duck along with M.O.D.O.K. (2021), Hit-Monkey (2021), and Tigra & Dazzler were planned to lead to a crossover event The Offenders, which would have been titled The Offenders: Giant Sized Man Thing, with the characters all meeting the swamp monster Man-Thing; the crossover was cancelled in part once again because of Marvel Studios' plans for the character.

By August 2021, Marvel Studios was developing a Halloween-themed television special for Disney+ that was reportedly centered on Werewolf by Night, though it was unclear if either the Jack Russell or Jake Gomez versions of the character would be featured. Michael Giacchino was hired to direct the one-hour special by March 2022, after previously scoring several MCU films, and having been rumored to be directing a Marvel Disney+ project since December 2021; Giacchino previously directed the 2018 short film Monster Challenge and the animated Star Trek: Short Treks episode "Ephraim and Dot" (2019). When Feige asked Giacchino which Marvel Comics property he wanted to work on, the producer was initially surprised to hear Giacchino's interest in Werewolf by Night, but was enthused after further discussing his ideas for it. The project was being referred to by some as Werewolf by Night, although The Hollywood Reporter noted that it could have a different title. Giacchino confirmed he was directing the special in June 2022, calling it an enjoyable but "challenging process".

That September, Marvel Studios officially revealed the special, titled Werewolf by Night. The special was described as Marvel Studios' "first-ever special presentation", and was marketed as a "Marvel Studios Special Presentation"; it is 53 minutes long. There was no mandate for how long the special should be, but the creatives all believed it should be around an hour. Giacchino approached the special like an episode of The Twilight Zone, in that it would present "one night in the life of [Jack Russell and Elsa Bloodstone], and see what happens". This allowed them to avoid needing to cover more of an origin story than needed, or setting up what would happen after the events of the special. Marvel Studios' Feige, Stephen Broussard, Louis D'Esposito, Victoria Alonso, and Brad Winderbaum serve as executive producers.

=== Writing ===
Heather Quinn and Peter Cameron co-wrote the screenplay, from a story by Quinn; Quinn previously wrote for the Marvel Studios Disney+ series Hawkeye (2021) and Cameron wrote for WandaVision (2021) and Moon Knight (2022). Quinn was asked to pitch for the special while she was working on set of Hawkeye in early 2021. She worked closely with Giacchino to craft the story of the special.

Giacchino said the special was inspired by horror films from the 1930s and 1940s, comparing it to the film Poltergeist (1982), which was a major influence for the special, in that it would have "the right level of scares". Other inspirations included The Twilight Zone, King Kong (1933), and The Wolf Man (1941), with Giacchino calling Werewolf by Night a "love letter" to these horror inspirations. Additionally, Giacchino tried to approach the special with a "moral center" beyond "just blood and guts". Disney+ stated that the special would "evoke a sense of dread and the macabre, with plenty of suspense and scares along the way". Feige called the special "fun", adding that it was also "a little darker [and] a little scarier" than the studio's other content. Elements of the Werewolf by Night character were altered from the comics to allow the story to work in a more modern setting; Quinn cited the Werewolf by Night issues "Carnival of Fear" and "The Danger Game", and Man-Thing, Bloodstone, and Monsters Unleashed titles as inspiration from the comics for the special. The special also features Man-Thing, at the suggestion of Feige. Man-Thing is only referred to as Ted in Werewolf by Night, with Giacchino wanting to call him by his actual name as "a way to humanize him". There were also considerations to refer to him as a "Giant-Size Man-Thing" (a reference to one of his comic book titles) but this and others "never felt quite right" and seemed "a little too cheeky".

Giacchino had assumed Werewolf by Night would be rated TV-MA given its use of blood and the scare elements, but felt that it being in black-and-white helped it be rated TV-14. Werewolf by Night does not give exact details as to how it fits into the larger MCU, but Giacchino described it as being "within the realm" of the MCU. He added that it was "not important" to show the "where, when, how" of how Werewolf by Night fits within the MCU. The special's introduction provides context to how monsters have previously existed within the MCU, despite no previous mentions, much in the way the film Eternals (2021) weaved the Eternals into the background history of the MCU. An illustration of the Avengers is featured in the introduction, which was added after audiences in the first few test screenings were looking for and questioning why established MCU characters did not make an appearance. Giacchino wanted Werewolf by Night to be largely separate from the larger MCU, but conceded that this illustration helped place the special within the MCU and make a connection for the audiences that those characters are "okay. They live in this world. They're a part of this, they're just not going to be seen" in the special.

Giacchino has "a very specific idea" of how the special fits into the MCU that he used as a personal reference while making the special, but had not discussed it with Marvel Studios. The special is largely a self-contained story within the MCU, with no appearances by established characters, though there had been some consideration to include Blade. Further discussing Werewolf by Night's place within the MCU timeline, Giacchino explained that it had not been designed with a specific spot in mind, only that "it exists around the time that those characters exist", and felt "if someday it would make sense to find out what time slot is best for it" then that could be determined at a future point.

=== Casting ===
A search for a male Latino actor in their 30s to portray the lead role in the special was underway by the end of August 2021, with Gael García Bernal cast in the role in November. In January 2022, Laura Donnelly was cast in an undisclosed role. Bernal and Donnelly did not have to audition, with Giacchino directly reaching out to Bernal and choosing Donnelly given he was a fan of her previous work. In September, Bernal and Donnelly were respectively confirmed as Jack Russell / Werewolf by Night and Elsa Bloodstone. Additional castings include Harriet Sansom Harris as Verussa Bloodstone, Al Hamacher as Billy Swan, Eugenie Bondurant as Azarel, Kirk R. Thatcher as Jovan, Leonardo Nam as Liorn, Daniel J. Watts as Barasso, Carey Jones as Ted / Man-Thing, with the special's editor Jeffrey Ford providing additional vocalizations, and Richard Dixon voicing Ulysses Bloodstone. Jovan was loosely based on and inspired by the comics character Joshua Kane.

=== Design ===
Maya Shimoguchi served as the production designer, having previously worked on Hawkeye. Prior to that, she also served as the supervising art director for the MCU film Thor (2011). Shimoguchi created "a richly textured environment" out of concrete for the rotunda and garden that evoked film noir. The fresco in the hallway of Bloodstone Manor that referenced the history of monsters in the MCU was inspired by the Bayeux Tapestry.

For the werewolf design in the special, Giacchino enjoyed being able to see an actor's face and eyes in the designs for older films such as Werewolf of London (1935) since they "kept the human qualities", with Werewolf by Night looking more like Larry Talbot / The Wolf Man from The Wolf Man than a more monster-like design created through CGI in more modern films. Mayes C. Rubeo served as the costume designer, after doing so for the MCU projects Thor: Ragnarok (2017), WandaVision (2021) and Thor: Love and Thunder (2022). Russell wears face paint that he claims is to "honor [his] ancestors", while his outfit consists of a detailed coat and tie. Elsa wears a bright orange coat that pays homage to the character's iconic comic book look, which consists of an orange jumpsuit under a trench coat.

=== Filming ===
Filming was expected to begin in late March 2022 at Trilith Studios in Atlanta, Georgia, under the working title Buzzcut, and had begun by March 29. Zoë White served as cinematographer. Filming was previously expected to begin in February to last for a month until March. Werewolf by Night employed many practical effects, such as Russell's transformation into a werewolf. Visual effects supervisor Joe Farrell assisted with this, which "took months to design and figure out" how to execute. The transformation is seen mainly from Elsa's perspective, which was done because Giacchino felt this would be scarier if the audience was not fully shown the transformation. The only CGI elements were the cage bars, as the practical ones had to be removed when shooting to achieve the proper shadow projection from the projector. Another practical technique used was filming various moments backwards to then be reversed during editing, such as Verussa being grabbed by the werewolf; actress Samson was filmed starting against the cage and then was pulled away from it.

Man-Thing was realized through a combination of actor Carey Jones in a practical suit, animatronics, and practical and CGI effects. KNB EFX Group created all of the practical monsters and animatronics for the special, including a life-size practical Man-Thing animatronic that was used for an on-set reference. Giacchino noted the other monsters in the special were created with practical effects and that CGI elements were only used for Man-Thing because they would have not been able to create him without them, though they had attempted to use the animatronic for the entire special. Ulysses Bloodstone was an animatronic puppet, which came at the suggestion of Cameron late in the production process. Some of the "more brutal elements" in the special and its fight sequences were conceived on the day of filming. The fight between the guards and the werewolf was filmed as a continuous shot, with the stunt performers in the scene only needing two takes for it. Filming lasted 18 days, and had wrapped by late April.

=== Post-production ===
Jeffrey Ford served as the editor for the special, after previously doing so for prior MCU media. The special was shot in color and early edits were also in color. Giacchino hoped to be able to release it in black-and-white, and eventually created a black-and-white cut to show Feige; he explained that Marvel Studios was on board with the special being in black-and-white after they saw it that way, noting it was "the right thing to do for the spirit of the story we were telling". Co-executive producer Brian Gay further noted that the black-and-white cinematography paid homage to classic monster films and emphasized the special's uniqueness from other MCU properties. The end of the special transitions into color, with Giacchino doing this to show the "nightmare is over" for Elsa and "things are now changing and evolving and hopefully the future will be a brighter place". The special was printed to black-and-white film and then scanned back in digitally to achieve a film look and quality to it. Reel change markers were also added in to enhance the stylistic look. Visual effects were created by JAMM, Zoic Studios, Base FX, SDFX Studios, and Digital Domain.

=== Music ===
Giacchino also scored the special in addition to directing, and wrote the theme for the special prior to filming, allowing him to modify it during that process. He would present musical excerpts during meetings in pre-production or ahead of filming to help convey the tone he was envisioning for what was being discussed. Much of the score was composed while Giacchino was editing the special, which allowed him to present new ideas to Ford in the moment, who would subsequently suggest another edit based on that new music. While much of the score is orchestral, Giacchino uses synthesizers and drum machines in the end credits music. He did this to "shake things up" musically after much of the presceding music was more classical, and to remind audiences that the special was still a modern story despite its older feel and influences. The special also featured the songs "I Never Had a Chance" by Irving Berlin, "Wishing (Will Make It So)" by Vera Lynn, and "Over the Rainbow" by Judy Garland. The score for the special was released digitally by Marvel Music and Hollywood Records on October 7, with four additional tracks released on October 27, 2022, as part of an updated edition of the soundtrack album.

Two "live-to-picture" performances occurred in October 2023, with the Minnesota Orchestra on October 4 and the National Symphony Orchestra on October 21. The first half of the performance examined old horror films and how music was used with them, while the second half saw the orchestras performing the Werewolf by Night score live to a screening of the special.

== Marketing ==
The teaser trailer and poster for the special were revealed at the 2022 D23 Expo. The trailer was noted for appearing in black-and-white and having other film elements resembling classic horror films. Maggie Boccella from Collider felt the trailer was "presented like an old school Hammer Horror film", comparing it to the works of Lon Chaney and Bela Lugosi, both actors known primarily for their roles in horror films. Amanda Lamadrid of Screen Rant called the trailer "shocking and unique", saying it shows Marvel "going all-in on the vintage scream factor" while adding that the special looks "unlike any previous MCU project".

== Release ==
Werewolf by Night was released on Disney+ on October 7, 2022. A special screening occurred at Fantastic Fest in Austin, Texas on September 25, 2022, and at Hollywood Forever Cemetery on October 6 as part of a Disney+ Halloween-themed event called "Hallowstream" alongside the WandaVision episode "All-New Halloween Spooktacular!" (2021). An additional screening occurred on October 13, 2022, at the New Beverly Cinema, with the special being presented on 35 mm movie film. It is part of Phase Four of the MCU. Werewolf by Night was made available on Hulu from September 15 until October 31, 2023, as part of its "Huluween" programming.

== Reception ==
=== Viewership ===
JustWatch, a guide to streaming content with access to data from more than 20 million users around the world, reported that Werewolf by Night was the second most-streamed film in the U.S. from October 3–9. Whip Media, which tracks viewership data for the more than 21 million worldwide users of its TV Time app, calculated that it was the most-streamed film in the U.S. for the week ending October 9. Werewolf by Night remained in the top five from October 16 –23 before moving to sixth place for the week ending October 30.

=== Critical response ===
The review aggregator website Rotten Tomatoes reported an 90% approval rating, with an average score of 7.5/10, based on 113 reviews. The website's critics consensus reads: "A spooky yarn told with taut economy, Werewolf by Night is a standout Marvel entry that proves Michael Giacchino as atmospheric and skilled a director as he is a composer." Metacritic, which uses a weighted average, assigned the special a score of 69 out of 100 based on 17 critics, indicating "generally favorable reviews".

Jordan Moreau from Variety called Werewolf by Night "a triumphant first effort at losing the capes and spandex and delving into more genre territory for Marvel" and enjoyed the introduction of Russell and Bloodstone to the MCU, particularly noting Man-Thing's appearance which he called the "MVP" of the special, though feeling the other characters were forgettable. Moreau was not as keen on the look of the werewolf, wishing it was more "intimidating or hulking" as creatures from other monster films. Writing for The Hollywood Reporter, Daniel Feinberg said, "At only 52 minutes and decidedly light on plot and supporting characters, it's a slight but fairly amusing thing, elevated above being a mere exercise in style by the lead performances from Gael Garcia Bernal and Laura Donnelly." He applauded the design of Bloodstone Manor and the "vintage spooky homages" but wished Giacchino and White had "pushed the extremes of the aesthetic even more" than they did. Feinberg called Giacchino's score "the standout element that ties everything together". In his review for Rolling Stone, David Fear said "Werewolf by Night feels less like a franchise detour than a fun day trip into previously untrampled genre territory." He continued that Giacchino's direction had "a great sense of how to sustain a mood without losing momentum" and praised the cinematography and Russell's werewolf transformation.

Chris Evangelista of /Film gave Werewolf by Night a 7 out of 10, describing the television special as "a quick, violent, funny monster movie homage, and it's perfect for Halloween." He praised the use of practical effects for the werewolf's portrayal as opposed to CGI and the black-and-white cinematography styles. Germain Lussier at Gizmodo described the special as "a beautiful, over-the-top, entertaining short that would work even if it had nothing to do with Marvel". He did feel the pace of the special prevented being able to fully take in all the characters and encounters presented. Marisa Mirabal of IndieWire gave the special "B+", enjoying the design work of Shimoguchi and White, Giacchino's "larger-than-life score", and the use of practical effects. Though she was impressed by the balance of violence and comedy in the special, along with a "tight and concise" storyline, she noted that because of its short run time, "the characters [were] not able to be fully developed and explored".

=== Accolades ===
Accolades received by Werewolf by Night
Award	Date of ceremony	Category	Recipient(s)	Result	Ref.
International Film Music Critics Association Awards	February 23, 2023	Best Original Score for a Horror/Thriller Film	Michael Giacchino	Nominated	
Critics' Choice Super Awards	March 16, 2023	Best Superhero Series, Limited Series or Made-For-TV Movie	Werewolf by Night	Nominated	
Critics' Choice Super Awards	March 16, 2023	Best Villain in a Series	Harriet Sansom Harris	Nominated	
Saturn Awards	February 4, 2024	Best Television Presentation	Werewolf by Night	Won	
Saturn Awards	February 4, 2024	Best Guest Star in a Television Series	Gael García Bernal	Nominated	

== Other media ==
=== Director by Night ===
In September 2022, a documentary special for Werewolf by Night was announced from Marvel Studios Unscripted Content and Michael Giacchino's brother Anthony, who served as the writer and director. The documentary, titled Director by Night, goes behind the scenes at the making of Werewolf by Night and explores Michael Giacchino's style, vision, and dream for directing, and includes 8 mm film footage Giacchino shot in his childhood. Director by Night was released on Disney+ on November 4, 2022, marketed with the "Marvel Studios Special Presentation" branding.

=== Werewolf by Night in Color ===
Werewolf by Night, as seen in the original black-and-white release (top) and the In Color release (bottom).

A colored version of the special, Werewolf by Night in Color, was revealed in September 2023. Discussions and tests for releasing a colored version began as production was finishing on the original black-and-white version in 2022, with Giacchino noting that the look of the special with color was considered during filming in the event they were able to release it that way. Each scene of Werewolf by Night was examined for its color adjustments, ensuring the changes per scene created a unified look. The creatives used the film scan of the special to reexamine its color and ensure the choices they made matched that film look. Giacchino likened the release to the horror films released by Hammer Film Productions that had "saturated colors and stark lighting". He was concerned with how the full color release would impact the end of the special, which sees the special change from black-and-white to color as Elsa brings "color to a place that was for years a dreary part of her life", but stated he "still felt the same feelings" calling it "just a different experience". The use of blood in the special did not have to be altered in terms of the amount seen or color; this had been a concern when releasing the black-and-white version in regards to how it would affect the special's rating.

Werewolf by Night in Color was screened in North Hollywood on October 15, 2023, along with a discussion with Giacchino, and was released on Disney+ as part of its "Hallowstream" programming on October 20, 2023. Giacchino hoped to created a 35 mm version of the In Color special as had been done with the original.

== Future ==
In September 2022, Gay said that Werewolf by Night would begin to explore a variety of monsters that have existed in the MCU for centuries, such as artwork featured in the special. Furthermore, he stated that the idea was to have such monsters appear in future projects. Gay also explained the special's ending intentionally left Russell and Bloodstone "totally changed" and in "a space that they did not expect to find themselves in", and felt it was the beginning for their characters but was uncertain if they would return. Feige said the special would introduce a part of the MCU that would become "quite important" to its future. In October 2023, while clarifying there were no immediate plans for further projects, Giacchino stated he had "crazy and nuts" ideas for additional stories with these characters. In July 2026, Giacchino stated that there had been early discussions about a sequel, but noted that a "lot of planning has to happen" and any project would have to fit within Marvel Studios's larger development plans. Winderbaum said in October 2026 that he was very receptive to continuing Werewolf by Night in some form.
