= The Charlie Davis Orchestra =

American jazz band

The Charlie Davis Orchestra was a jazz band from Indiana that was active in the 1920s and 1930s. For a while the band's vocalist was Dick Powell.

== History ==
One of the most famous bands in the Hoosier state at the time, the Charlie Davis Orchestra gained notoriety in the 1920s at the Indiana Theatre and the Columbia Club and made radio broadcasts on WLW and WFBM where many of their recordings were made. The band had close connections with the Royal Peacocks, the Jean Goldkette orchestra, and Hoagy Carmichael.

The band toured in the 1920s and 1930s, performing at the Brooklyn Paramount Theatre and the New York Paramount Theatre, sharing billing with Duke Ellington and Rubinoff. When the band played at the Paramount in New York City in 1930, the leader singer was Dick Powell.

With the advent of the Great Depression, the band and its band members found the market for small and large orchestras change overnight and could not weather the shock of fewer bookings. It disbanded in 1929. Davis wrote about the band in his memoir That Band from Indiana (1982).

== Personnel ==
- Charlie Davis – piano, trumpet, bandleader
- Ralph Hayes – trumpet
- Harry Wiliford – trumpet and vocals
- Charlie Fach – trombone
- Phil Davis – trombone
- Ray Shonfield – saxophone
- Kenny Knot – piano
- Jack Drummond – double bass
- Ralph Lillard – drums and composer
- Lewis Lowe – vocals
- Dick Powell – vocals

== Discography ==
- "There's No End to My Love for You" (Vocalion, 1928)
- "When" (Vocalion, 1928)
- "The Drag" (Vocalion, 1928)
- "You're a Real Sweetheart" (Vocalion, 1928)
- "Just Like a Melody Out of the Sky" (Vocalion, 1928)
- "You're A Real Sweetheart" (Vocalion, 1928)
- "Suppose Nobody Cared" (Brunswick, 1928)
- "Mean to Me" (Gennett, 1929)
- "I Never Had A Chance/Rollin' Home" (1934)
