= Werewolf by Night (soundtrack) =

Marvel Studios' Werewolf by Night (Original Soundtrack)

Film score by Michael Giacchino
- Released: October 7, 2022
- Studio: Abbey Road Studios
- Genre: Film score
- Length: 41:25
- Labels: Hollywood; Marvel Music

Michael Giacchino chronology
Thor: Love and Thunder (2022)	Werewolf by Night (Original Soundtrack) (2022)	Next Goal Wins (2023)

Marvel Studios' Werewolf by Night (Original Soundtrack) is the film score to the Marvel Studios television special Werewolf by Night, directed and composed by Michael Giacchino. The soundtrack album was released by Hollywood Records and Marvel Music on October 7, 2022, coinciding with the Disney+ release.

== Development ==
In addition to directing, Giacchino also scored the music for the special. Giacchino initially felt hesitant, as a composer, he collaborates with directors to discuss ideas about how the music being an integral part of the storytelling process, and acts as the best form of a story narration. Since, he is also taking the directorial debut, he felt on how the music could shape up, which he felt like "a Moon Knight talking to himself throughout the whole thing", where he had two versions: the composer and the director. Giacchino did not want to approach from the point of view, where he could write horror music for a sequence, but instead he approached on how he would feel, when "he becomes Jack or Elsa that moment", so that he could write music that feels like the true emotions, which is necessary for storytelling.

He also wrote the main theme prior filming, so that he could modify the theme during the process. He would present musical excerpts during meeting in pre-production or ahead of filming to help convey the tone he was envisioning for what was being discussed. The co-executive producer of Marvel Studios, Brian Gay also agreed Giacchino's views on how the score should fit each tone as music was not only an emotional, but also a universal language. Giacchino had written most of the music while editing the special, to make sure that each material had been completed. This allowed him to present new ideas to editor Jeffrey Ford in the moment, who would subsequently suggest another edit based on that new music. The score album was digitally released on October 7, with four additional tracks released on October 27, 2022 as part of an updated edition of the soundtrack album.

== Track listing ==
All music composed by Michael Giacchino.

No.	Title	Length
1.	"A Marvel Studios Special Presentation"	0:12
2.	"Mane Title"	3:02
3.	"Hall of Shame"	1:00
4.	"Ulysses's Rant"	3:24
5.	"There Is No Peace Without Tuba"	4:17
6.	"Scot Free"	0:47
7.	"A Farewell to Arm"	3:27
8.	"Cryptic Messages"	0:59
9.	"Tales from the Crypt"	2:29
10.	"Elsa's Ted Talk"	3:17
11.	"Beach Blanket Betrayal"	3:23
12.	"Where's Wolf"	4:01
13.	"I Don't Know Jack"	3:12
14.	"Mane on Ends"	1:58
15.	"End Shredits"	4:21
16.	"Mane Theme – Piano Arrangement"	1:35
Total length:		41:25

Updated edition
No.	Title	Length
1.	"A Marvel Studios Special Presentation"	0:12
2.	"Mane Title"	3:02
3.	"Hall of Shame"	1:00
4.	"Ulysses's Rant"	3:24
5.	"There Is No Peace Without Tuba"	4:17
6.	"Scot Free"	0:47
7.	"Big Shoes to Fill"	1:30
8.	"A Farewell to Arm"	3:27
9.	"Cryptic Messages"	0:59
10.	"Tales from the Crypt"	2:29
11.	"Two Lefts Make a Right"	2:01
12.	"Elsa's Ted Talk"	3:17
13.	"All the World's a Cage"	0:58
14.	"Beach Blanket Betrayal"	3:23
15.	"World's Worst Makeover"	1:59
16.	"Where's Wolf"	4:01
17.	"I Don't Know Jack"	3:12
18.	"Mane on Ends"	1:58
19.	"End Shredits"	4:21
20.	"Mane Theme – Piano Arrangement"	1:35
Total length:		47:55

== Additional music ==
The special also featured the songs "I Never Had a Chance" by Irving Berlin, "Wishing (Will Make It So)" by Vera Lynn, and "Over the Rainbow" by Judy Garland.

== Reception ==
Zanobard Reviews wrote "Michael Giacchino's Werewolf By Night is a shorter, much more close-knit soundtrack than we're perhaps used to by the composer, but that doesn't stop it from being very well crafted and damned entertaining throughout its just over forty minute runtime." Critic James Southall of Movie Wave wrote "The film itself is less than an hour long so it's no surprise that the album features the complete score [...] it could be a bit tighter – most of the music is very entertaining but there are some shorter tracks in between that take a bit away from the overall experience – but there's no doubting Giacchino's skill in this genre and he provides plenty to sink your teeth into." Writing for IndieWire, Marisa Mirabal stated that Giacchino's "larger-than-life score transports audiences back to the golden age of horror", while Brian Tallerico of RogerEbert.com had opined that the score is "arguably the MVP (minimum viable product)".
