= The Suicide Squad (soundtrack) =

2021 soundtrack of the film "The Suicide Squad"

The Suicide Squad (Score from the Original Motion Picture Soundtrack)

Film score by John Murphy
- Released: August 6, 2021
- Recorded: 2021
- Genre: Film score
- Length: 50:58
- Labels: Troll Court; WaterTower
- Producer: John Murphy

John Murphy chronology
Kick-Ass: Music from the Motion Picture (2010)	The Suicide Squad (2021)	The Guardians of the Galaxy Holiday Special (2022)

The Suicide Squad (Original Motion Picture Soundtrack) is the soundtrack album for the film of the same name. The album was released on August 6, 2021, by Troll Court Entertainment and WaterTower Music. The album features several songs from different artists, which were personally selected by the film's director James Gunn, who has called the album his "curated mix tape". A single for the soundtrack called "Rain" by Jessie Reyez and Grandson was released on June 22 as part of the soundtrack. A separate film score album, titled The Suicide Squad (Score from the Original Picture Soundtrack), was also released by WaterTower Music on the same date with John Murphy as the composer, replacing Gunn's frequent collaborator Tyler Bates who was originally to be the film's composer. A single for Murphy's score "So This Is The Famous Suicide Squad", was made available on July 8.

== Background ==
Tyler Bates was originally pitched to be the film's composer, due to his frequent collaboration with director James Gunn. During pre-production, Bates wrote music for Gunn to use on set as he had previously done for Gunn on the Guardians of the Galaxy films. However he left for unknown reasons and in May 2020, British composer John Murphy replaced Bates. For the soundtrack, Gunn personally choose the songs that he would be introducing. Gunn picked "Folsom Prison Blues" by Johnny Cash as the first one. He also revealed that he also planned to use other songs, like "Modern Love" by David Bowie, but decided that they would not be used. He created a Spotify playlist containing several songs that he almost used in the film and named it "Not-In-The-Suicide-Squad playlist". Shortly prior to the film's release, Gunn revealed that he used the songs that better fit in a scene by commenting: "I write all of the songs into the screenplay, and then those songs we play on set as we do the scenes".

== Track listing ==
All music composed by John Murphy.

No.	Title	Length
1.	"So This Is the Famous Suicide Squad"	1:49
2.	"Approaching the Beach"	1:12
3.	"Mayhem on the Beach"	2:13
4.	"Waller's Deal - Meet the Team"	2:19
5.	"Harley Gets the Javelin"	0:58
6.	"Approaching the Guerrilla Camp"	1:46
7.	"Project Starfish"	2:03
8.	"Red Flag"	2:48
9.	"Interdimensional Virus"	2:26
10.	"Ratcatcher's Story"	3:09
11.	"Harley Sings"	1:31
12.	"Breaking into Jotunheim"	1:37
13.	"Dirty Little Secrets"	2:23
14.	"Peacemaker... What a Joke"	1:41
15.	"King Shark and the Clyrax" (featuring Jessica Rotter)	2:16
16.	"Bombs Go Off!"	2:57
17.	"Suicide Squad vs. Starro the Conqueror"	3:55
18.	"The Star-Crossed Wake Up"	1:47
19.	"Panic on the Streets"	1:17
20.	"The Squad Turn Back" (includes Suicide Squad theme by Steven Price)	1:32
21.	"The Squad Fight Back"	3:30
22.	"Ratism"	3:28
23.	"Bloodsport's Deal"	2:10
Total length:		50:58

== The Suicide Squad (Original Motion Picture Soundtrack) ==
The Suicide Squad (Original Motion Picture Soundtrack)

Soundtrack album by various artists
- Released: August 6, 2021
- Length: 45:25
- Label: WaterTower
- Producer: various

Singles from The Suicide Squad
- 1. "Rain" Released: June 22, 2021

All the songs from the soundtrack are featured in the film. Also featured in the film was the song "People Who Died" by the Jim Carroll Band, but is not featured in the soundtrack. "What a Way to Die" by The Pleasure Seekers was considered to be used in the film at the opening credits sequence, but the song "People Who Died" was used instead. "Modern Love" by David Bowie, "Rusty Cage" by Johnny Cash, "Draw the Line" by Aerosmith and "Death on Two Legs" by Queen were also considered to be part of the film's soundtrack, but they were dropped. Other rejected songs were "Somos Sur" by Ana Tijoux & Shadia Mansour, "The Human Paradox" by Dynazty, "Resistiré" by Resistré México, "A Perfect Miracle" by Spiritualized, "Sometimes" by Kero Kero Bonito and "El Pueblo Unido Jamas Sera Vencido" by Inti-Illimani. "Dirty Work" by Steely Dan was featured in the trailer but not the film itself. James Gunn shared a Spotify playlist with the name "Songs Not Used in The Suicide Squad" that features all the songs that were planned to be in the film but were eventually dropped.

=== Track listing ===
No.	Title	Artist(s)	Length
1.	"Folsom Prison Blues (Live)"	Johnny Cash	2:42
2.	"Sucker's Prayer"	The Decemberists	3:28
3.	"Samba Na Sola"	Céu	3:07
4.	"Whistle for the Choir"	The Fratellis	3:35
5.	"Point of Know Return"	Kansas	3:10
6.	"Sola"	Jessie Reyez	3:29
7.	"Can't Sleep"	K.Flay	4:11
8.	"Quem Tem Joga"	Drik Barbosa, Gloria Groove & Karol Conká	4:05
9.	"Rain"	Grandson & Jessie Reyez	3:56
10.	"Just a Gigolo / I Ain't Got Nobody (And Nobody Cares for Me)" [Medley]"	Louis Prima	4:43
11.	"Hey"	Pixies	3:31
12.	"So Busted"	Culture Abuse	2:03
13.	"Oh No!!!"	Grandson	3:35
Total length:			45:25
