= Thor: Love and Thunder (soundtrack) =

Thor: Love and Thunder (Original Motion Picture Soundtrack)

Film score by Michael Giacchino and Nami Melumad
- Released: July 6, 2022
- Genre: Film score
- Length: 1:04:35
- Labels: Hollywood; Marvel Music

Michael Giacchino and Nami Melumad chronology
Lightyear (2022)	Thor: Love and Thunder (Original Motion Picture Soundtrack) (2022)	Werewolf by Night (2022)

Thor: Love and Thunder (Original Motion Picture Soundtrack) is the film score for the Marvel Studios film Thor: Love and Thunder by Michael Giacchino and Nami Melumad. The soundtrack album was released by Hollywood Records on July 6, 2022.

== Background ==
In December 2021, Michael Giacchino revealed that he would be scoring Love and Thunder; he previously scored Doctor Strange (2016) and the MCU Spider-Man trilogy for Marvel Studios, as well as Waititi's previous film Jojo Rabbit (2019). A soundtrack album, featuring Giacchino's original themes along with the score composed by Giacchino and Nami Melumad, was released by Hollywood Records and Marvel Music on July 6, 2022. The single "Mama's Got a Brand New Hammer", the film's main suite, was released on June 30.

== Track listing ==
All music composed by Michael Giacchino and Nami Melumad.

No.	Title	Length
1.	"Mama's Got a Brand New Hammer"	6:10
2.	"Just Desert"	2:25
3.	"Indigarr with the Diva"	1:44
4.	"The Not Ready for New Asgard Players"	1:39
5.	"See Jane Thor"	1:08
6.	"Distressed Out"	2:38
7.	"Gorr Animals"	2:33
8.	"A Gorr Phobia"	2:08
9.	"The Ax Games"	1:21
10.	"Thorring to New Heights"	0:57
11.	"Show Intel"	2:53
12.	"We're Not Emos We're Gods"	0:51
13.	"The Zeus Fanfares"	1:26
14.	"I Was in the Pool!"	2:25
15.	"Saving Face"	3:09
16.	"Utter Lunarcy"	1:24
17.	"Think on Your Defeat"	1:41
18.	"Bedside Hammer"	1:35
19.	"Temple-itis"	1:38
20.	"Surely, Temple"	1:01
21.	"The Power of Thor Propels You"	2:01
22.	"Foster? I Barely Know Her!"	3:06
23.	"Jane Stop This Crazy Thing"	2:52
24.	"One Wish to Rule Them All"	2:58
25.	"All's Fair in Love and Thor"	1:44
26.	"Bawl and Jane"	1:23
27.	"The Kids Are Alright"	1:21
28.	"The Ballad of Love and Thunder"	8:12
Total length:		59:03

== Additional music ==
Director Taika Waititi wanted the music to reflect the same aesthetic of the film with its "bombastic, loud, colorful palette". "Sweet Child o' Mine" by Guns N' Roses is featured in the film, given Guns N' Roses is one of Waititi's favorite bands, and helped "reflect the sort of crazy adventure that we're [visually] presenting"; the song was also used in the film's marketing. Other songs featured in the film include: "Only Time" by Enya; "Welcome to the Jungle", "Paradise City", and "November Rain" by Guns N' Roses; "Fighting" by Michael Raphael; "Our Last Summer" by ABBA; "Family Affair" by Mary J. Blige; "Goodies" by Ciara featuring Petey Pablo; and "Rainbow in the Dark" by Dio. Also included is the "Old Spice Sea Chanty" by Ginger Johnson and an original song, "Hey Ninny-Nonny", performed by Waititi.

== Charts ==
Weekly chart performance for Thor: Love and Thunder (Original Motion Picture Soundtrack)
Chart (2022)	Peak position
UK Soundtrack Albums (OCC)	33
