= Rubinoff =

Rubinoff is a surname. Notable people with the surname include:

- David Rubinoff (1897–1986), Russian-American violinist
- Ed Rubinoff (born 1935), American tennis player
- Ira Rubinoff (born 1938), American marine biologist
- Jeffrey Rubinoff (1945–2017), Canadian sculptor
