= The Guardians of the Galaxy Holiday Special (soundtrack) =

The Guardians of the Galaxy Holiday Special (Original Soundtrack)

Soundtrack album by John Murphy
- Released: November 23, 2022
- Studio: Abbey Road Studios
- Genre: Film score
- Length: 22:44
- Labels: Hollywood; Marvel Music
- Producers: John Murphy; James Gunn; Rhett Miller

John Murphy chronology
The Suicide Squad (2021)	The Guardians of the Galaxy Holiday Special (2022)	Guardians of the Galaxy Vol. 3 (2023)

The Guardians of the Galaxy Holiday Special (Original Soundtrack) is the soundtrack to the Marvel Studios television special The Guardians of the Galaxy Holiday Special, featuring the superhero team Guardians of the Galaxy based on Marvel Comics. It was released by Hollywood Records and Marvel Music on November 23, 2022. The album featured the original score composed by John Murphy, while also includes songs from the Old 97's who also play the fictional alien band in the special.

== Background ==
John Murphy wrote the score for the special simultaneously while working on Guardians of the Galaxy Vol. 3. As like previous Guardians of the Galaxy films, Gunn had chosen music for the special "very early". He wrote the lyrics to the opening song "I Don't Know What Christmas Is (But Christmastime Is Here)" and had approached Rhett Miller of the Old 97's to help him compose it, as Gunn has been a fan of the band, since the 1990s. "Here It Is Christmastime", an existing song of the Old 97's, was also used and re-recorded with Kevin Bacon providing vocals for the end of the special. Bacon said "[James] has got such a great ear for needle drops [...] I love this song, it's really hard to write a fresh Christmas song at this point. I started playing it, and I really was having a good time playing it and singing it."

"When I got the script, [Gunn] had referenced all the tunes, so I immediately made myself a playlist just to feel the vibe of the whole thing and listen to it a lot. And it's great, and I love the Old 97s song. It's really hard to write a new Christmas song, and I think it's got a really nice combination of sweetness and sentimentality without being a corny take on Christmas. And it rocks, and I loved it."

— Kevin Bacon on contributing to the Holiday Special soundtrack, besides appearing in the film.

== Track listing ==
The Guardians of the Galaxy Holiday Special (Original Soundtrack)
No.	Title	Artist(s)	Length
1.	"I Don't Know What Christmas Is (But Christmastime Is Here)"	Old 97's	3:03
2.	"How Yondu Ruined Christmas"		1:34
3.	"Telekinesis"		1:42
4.	"Kevin at Home"		1:57
5.	"Chasing Kevin"		1:22
6.	"Mantis Fights Back"		1:35
7.	"He's an Actor!"		1:17
8.	"The Best Christmas Present"		2:25
9.	"Kraglin Explains"		1:26
10.	"How the Story Really Ended"		1:29
11.	"Mantis Reveals Her Secret"		1:28
12.	"Here It Is Christmastime"	Kevin Bacon & Old 97's	3:26
Total length:			22:44

== Additional music ==
External audio
- Guardians of the Galaxy: The Official Mixtape presents all of the songs that are heard in the TV special, Spotify playlist created by James Gunn

The track list was revealed by Gunn on November 22, that features the following songs apart from the other original tracks, written for the special. These include: "Fairytale of New York" by the Pogues featuring Kirsty MacColl, "Dead by X-Mas" by Hanoi Rocks, "Christmas Treat" by Julian Casablancas, "Is This Christmas?" by the Wombats, "Just Like Christmas" by Low, "I Want an Alien for Christmas" by Fountains of Wayne, "Christmastime" by the Smashing Pumpkins, "Christmas Wrapping" by the Waitresses, and "Mrs. Claus" by Little Jackie. Unlike the previous Guardians of the Galaxy films, the selected songs were not released as an album. Gunn released a Spotify playlist that consisted all the songs featured in the special and songs from the previous films.

== Reception ==
The music has been reviewed and analysed by the critics as one of the "positive aspects of the special". Praising the musical tracks picked for the special, Joe George of Den of Geek said "the soundtrack is exactly what you'd expect if you asked your cooler older sibling to make a playlist for your Christmas party. It's a pleasing mix of familiar tracks and deep cuts, effectively balancing downbeat numbers with upbeat songs to make for a good party." "the special's soundtrack is on-brand, forgoing the usual standards for a playlist". Reviewing the score, Shubham Kulkarni of Koimoi wrote "The music by John Murphy combined with the vibrant visuals appropriate for Christmas celebration is such a vibe that you will immediately surrender to it."

== Commercial performance ==
The Old 97's single "I Don't Know What Christmas Is (But Christmastime Is Here)" debuted at number 4 on Billboard Holiday Digital Song Sales, number 5 on the Rock Digital Song Sales, and number 15 on the Digital Song Sales chart. The album further debuted at number 25 on Billboard Soundtracks.
