= I Never Had a Chance =

Song by Irving Berlin (1934)

"I Never Had A Chance" is a popular song written by Irving Berlin, published in 1934. Popular versions that year were by Eddy Duchin and by Glen Gray & The Casa Loma Orchestra (vocal by Kenny Sargent).

== Other notable recordings ==
- Ray Noble (vocal by Al Bowlly), (1934) "The Great British Dance Bands Play the Music of Irving Berlin 1931-39", World Record Club
- Frank Parrish & The Charlie Davis Orchestra (1934)
- Lew Stone (vocal by Al Bowlly), (1934) "The Songs of Irving Berlin", Sanctuary Records
- King Cole Trio - recorded August 6, 1947 for Capitol Records (vocal by Nat King Cole).
- Dean Martin - recorded the song on November 26, 1956, for Capitol Records and it was issued as no. F3718 in May 1957.
- Ella Fitzgerald - for her album Like Someone in Love (1957)
- Anita O'Day - included in her album Pick Yourself Up with Anita O'Day (1957)
- Peggy Lee - for her album Mink Jazz (1963)
- Allen Toussaint, "Irving Berlin's 20 Greatest Themes" (1989), Laser
- Greta Keller, "The Memory Lingers On - The Songs of Irving Berlin"
- Jimmy Mesene, "Hits of the 1930s (Vol. 1, British Dance Bands on Decca)", featured in the 2021 Marvel short film, "Werewolf By Night"
