= Fastball discography =

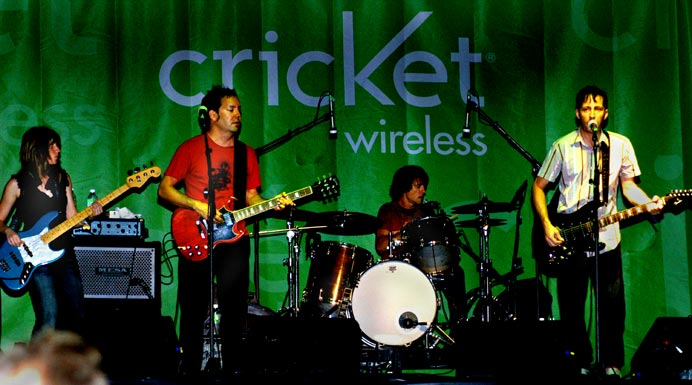
- Fastball performing at Waterloo Park in August 2006
- Studio albums: 9
- Extended plays: 1
- Live albums: 4
- Compilation albums: 1
- Singles: 18
- Music videos: 13

The discography of Fastball, an American rock band, consists of nine studio albums, one live album, one compilation album and eleven singles.

The band's debut album, Make Your Mama Proud, was released in April 1996. The album sold about 3,000 copies in its first year of release, failing to chart and putting the band's future in doubt. One single was released from the album, "Are You Ready for the Fallout?". The band's single "The Way" was released in February 1998 as the first single from the band's then-upcoming second studio album. It was a commercial success, peaking at number 4 on the Billboard Hot 100 Airplay chart and topping the Canadian Singles Chart. It also managed to chart in several other countries, including Australia, where peaked at number 14 and was certified gold by the Australian Recording Industry Association (ARIA). The band's second studio album, All the Pain Money Can Buy, was released the following month. The album peaked at number 29 on the US Billboard 200 and at number 18 on the Canadian Albums Chart, fueled by the success of "The Way". It went on to sell over 1,250,000 copies in the United States, earning a platinum certification from the Recording Industry Association of America (RIAA). The album's second single, "Fire Escape", peaked at number 86 on the US Billboard Hot 100 and at number 11 on the Canadian Singles Chart. "Out of My Head", the album's third and final single, gave the band its highest-charting song on the Hot 100, where it peaked at number 20.

The Harsh Light of Day, Fastball's third studio album, was released in September 2000. It peaked at number 97 on the Billboard 200 and sold 85,000 copies in the United States. Its lead single, "You're an Ocean", peaked at number 1 on the US Billboard Bubbling Under Hot 100 Singles chart. Two more singles were released from the album, "Love Is Expensive and Free" and "This Is Not My Life". A compilation album, Painting the Corners: The Best of Fastball, was released in August 2002. The live album Live from Jupiter Records was released in August 2003. The band's fourth studio album, Keep Your Wig On, was released in June 2004 and spawned three singles: "Airstream", "Drifting Away" and "Lou-ee Lou-ee". Little White Lies, the band's fifth studio album, was released in April 2009. Its title track was released as the album's first and only single, where it peaked at 26 on the Triple A charts.

In 2013, they released their first digital-only single, "Love Comes in Waves".

Fastball released their sixth studio album, Step Into Light, on May 19, 2017. The band released four singles and videos in support of this album, including "Step Into Light," "I Will Never Let You Down," "We're On Our Way," and "Best Friend."

In 2019, Fastball released The Help Machine. In support of the album, the band released music videos for the singles "The Help Machine" and "White Collar."

Fastball released its first EP, Soundtrack, in March 2022.

== Albums ==
=== Studio albums ===
List of studio albums, with selected chart positions, sales figures and certifications
Title	Album details	Peak chart positions						Sales	Certifications
Title	Album details	US	AUS	CAN	FIN	SWE	UK	Sales	Certifications
Make Your Mama Proud	Released: April 6, 1996; Label: Hollywood; Formats: CD, CS	—	—	—	—	—	—	US: 6,500	
All the Pain Money Can Buy	Released: March 10, 1998; Label: Hollywood; Formats: CD, CS, LP	29	84	18	28	22	109	US: 1,250,000	RIAA: Platinum; MC: Platinum
The Harsh Light of Day	Released: September 19, 2000; Label: Hollywood; Formats: CD, CS, LP	97	—	—	—	—	—	US: 85,000	
Keep Your Wig On	Released: June 8, 2004; Label: Rykodisc; Formats: CD, digital download	—	—	—	—	—	—		
Little White Lies	Released: April 14, 2009; Label: MRI, RED Distribution; Formats: CD, digital download	—	—	—	—	—	—		
Step Into Light	Released: May 19, 2017; Label: 33 1/3 Records; Formats: CD, digital download, vinyl	—	—	—	—	—	—		
The Help Machine	Released: October 18, 2019; Label: 33 1/3 Records; Formats: CD, digital download, vinyl	—	—	—	—	—	—		
The Deep End	Released: June 17, 2022; Label: 33 1/3 Records; Formats: CD, digital download	—	—	—	—	—	—		
Sonic Ranch	Released: June 14, 2024; Label: Sunset Blvd Records; Formats: CD, vinyl, digital download	—	—	—	—	—	—		
"—" denotes a recording that did not chart or was not released in that territory.

=== Live albums ===
List of live albums
Title	Album details
Live from Jupiter Records	Released: August 1, 2003; Label: Jupiter; Formats: CD
Live from Addison, Texas	Released: May 14, 2005; Label: Disclive; Formats: CD
Live from 3Ten	Released: December 4, 2020; Formats: Digital
Smashed Hits	Released: October 13, 2023; Label: Sunset Blvd. Records; Formats: CD, Digital

=== EPs ===
List of EPs
Title	Album details
Soundtrack	Released: March 18, 2022; Label: 33 and 1/3 Records; Formats: Digital

=== Compilation albums ===
List of compilation albums
Title	Album details
Painting the Corners: The Best of Fastball	Released: August 27, 2002; Label: Hollywood; Formats: CD

== Singles ==
List of singles, with selected chart positions and certifications, showing year released and album name
Title	Year	Peak chart positions										Certifications	Album
Title	Year	US	US Adult	US Alt.	US Main.	US Pop	AUS	CAN	CAN Alt.	SWE	UK	Certifications	Album
"Are You Ready for the Fallout?"	1997	—	—	—	—	—	—	—	—	—	—		Make Your Mama Proud
"The Way"	1998	—^{[A]}	2	1	25	4	14	1	1	7	21	ARIA: Gold; US: Gold	All the Pain Money Can Buy
"Fire Escape"	1998	86	19	13	25	29	—	11	5	—	—		All the Pain Money Can Buy
"Out of My Head"	1999	20	3	—	—	8	65	11	—	—	—		All the Pain Money Can Buy
"You're an Ocean"	2000	—^{[B]}	16	—	—	29	56	37	—	—	—		The Harsh Light of Day
"Love Is Expensive and Free"	2000	—	—	—	—	—	—	—	—	—	—		The Harsh Light of Day
"This Is Not My Life"	2000	—	—	—	—	—	—	—	—	—	—		The Harsh Light of Day
"Airstream"	2004	—	—	—	—	—	—	—	—	—	—		Keep Your Wig On
"Drifting Away"	2004	—	—	—	—	—	—	—	—	—	—		Keep Your Wig On
"Lou-ee Lou-ee"	2004	—	—	—	—	—	—	—	—	—	—		Keep Your Wig On
"Little White Lies"	2009	—	—	—	—	—	—	—	—	—	—		Little White Lies
"Love Comes in Waves"	2013	—	—	—	—	—	—	—	—	—	—		Step Into Light
"I Will Never Let You Down"	2017	—	—	—	—	—	—	—	—	—	—		Step Into Light
"We're On Our Way"	2017	—	—	—	—	—	—	—	—	—	—		Step Into Light
"Behind the Sun"	2017	—	—	—	—	—	—	—	—	—	—		Step Into Light
"Best Friend"	2017	—	—	—	—	—	—	—	—	—	—		Step Into Light
"The Help Machine"	2019	—	—	—	—	—	—	—	—	—	—		The Help Machine
"White Collar"	2019	—	—	—	—	—	—	—	—	—	—		The Help Machine
"Rather Be Me Than You"	2024	—	—	—	—	—	—	—	—	—	—		Sonic Ranch
"—" denotes a recording that did not chart or was not released in that territory.

== Guest appearances ==
List of guest appearances, showing year released and album name
Title	Year	Album
"This Guy's in Love With You"	2001	Lounge-A-Palooza
"Every Time She Walks"	2001	Summer Catch soundtrack
"The Real Me"	2001	Substitute - the Songs of the Who
"Busy Bodies"	2002	Almost You: The Songs Of Elvis Costello
"Till the End of the Day"	2002	This Is Where I Belong: The Songs of Ray Davies
"If Only You Were Lonely", "Til I Get It Right"	2005	Mississippi Studios: Live, Vol. 1
"Tush"	2017	All ATX, Vol. 5: Back to the Armadillo

== Music videos ==
List of music videos, showing year released and director
Title	Year	Director(s)
"The Way"	1998	McG
"Fire Escape"	1998	Francis Lawrence
"Out of My Head" (version 1)	1999	Ondi Timoner
"Out of My Head" (version 2)	1999	Jim Gable
"You're an Ocean"	2000	Jim Kohr
"Vampires"	2002	Bruce Malone
"Love Comes in Waves"	2013	Tyler Esposito
"Behind the Sun"	2016	Nigel Dick
"I Will Never Let You Down"	2017	Nigel Dick
"We're On Our Way"	2017	Nigel Dick
"Best Friend"	2017	Nigel Dick
“The Help Machine”	2019	Piotr Kabat & Alicja Kot
“White Collar“	2020	Alex Chod
"Rather Be Me Than You"	2024	Barbara FG

== Notes ==
- A "The Way" did not enter the Billboard Hot 100, but peaked at number 5 on the Hot 100 Airplay chart.
- B "You're an Ocean" did not enter the Billboard Hot 100, but peaked at number 1 on the Bubbling Under Hot 100 Singles chart, which acts as a 25-song extension to the Hot 100.
