= Painting the Corners: The Best of Fastball =

Painting The Corners: The Best of Fastball

Compilation album by Fastball
- Released: August 27, 2002
- Recorded: 1996–2002
- Genre: Rock
- Label: Hollywood

Fastball chronology
The Harsh Light of Day (2000)	Painting The Corners: The Best of Fastball (2002)	Live From Jupiter Records (2003)

Professional ratings
Review scores
Source	Rating
AllMusic	4/5 stars

Painting The Corners: The Best of Fastball is a compilation album released by the rock band Fastball. It was put together democratically by the band after they had parted ways with Hollywood Records.

== Track listing ==
#	Title	Length	Music
1	Make Your Mama Proud	2:11	Tony Scalzo
2	Emotional	2:20	Miles Zuniga
3	Out of My Head	2:33	Tony Scalzo
4	Fire Escape	3:22	Miles Zuniga
5	The Way	4:17	Tony Scalzo
6	Slow Drag	3:37	Miles Zuniga
7	Are You Ready for the Fallout?	3:12	Tony Scalzo
8	Dark Street	3:27	Miles Zuniga
9	You're an Ocean	3:19	Tony Scalzo
10	Vampires	3:11	Miles Zuniga
11	Human Torch	2:42	Tony Scalzo
12	Sooner or Later	2:40	Miles Zuniga
13	Love is Expensive and Free	3:03	Tony Scalzo
14	She Comes ‘Round	3:27	Miles Zuniga
15	Black Rain	2:56	Miles Zuniga
16	Funny How It Fades Away	4:10	Tony Scalzo
17	Vampires (Music Video)	7:42	Miles Zuniga
