= Hani Naser =

Jordanian-American musician (1950–2020)

Hani Naser هاني ناصر

Background information
- Born: Hani Nassar Naser; March 2, 1950; Ermameen, Jordan
- Origin: Yonkers, New York, U.S.
- Died: November 16, 2020 (aged 70) Ojai, California
- Genres: World music
- Occupations: Multi-instrumentalist, percussionist
- Instruments: Oud, goblet drum, djembe
- Years active: 1968–2020
- Website: www.haninaser.com

Hani Naser (Arabic: هاني ناصر; March 2, 1950 – November 16, 2020) was a Jordanian-American musician. He specialized in the oud and hand percussion instruments, particularly the goblet drum and djembe.

Naser was considered by critics to be a master in his field; Randy Lewis of the Los Angeles Times called him a "Veritable Hand Drum Wizard." He performed and recorded with a number of prominent musicians, including Nicky Hopkins, Jackson Browne, Bonnie Raitt, Ry Cooder, Jim Keltner, Steve Miller, Los Lobos, Violent Femmes, Don Henley, Hamza El Din, Jennifer Warnes, David Broza, Paco de Lucía, Santana, Brian Ritchie, Tony Trischka, Leftover Salmon, Quicksilver Messenger Service, John Hiatt, Warren Zevon, Ruben Blades, Lou Reed, The Blind Boys of Alabama, 7 Walkers (Bill Kreutzmann, Papa Mali, George Porter Jr., Matt Hubbard), and David Lindley.

== Early life ==
Naser was born in Jordan, in the mountain village of Ermameen on a hilltop outside Amman, where his grandfather was the village poet. His family were Christians from Nazareth, having converted from Judaism many centuries before. When Naser was seven months old, his family moved to Westchester County, New York, where he was raised. He returned occasionally to Jordan; Naser remembered that his grandfather "would grind and roast coffee, playing these rhythms, singing and chanting, the villagers would come up and he’d recite poetry. It was amazing."

Naser dipped into the nightlife of Manhattan, New York by taking the train to hear Bob Dylan and Joan Baez in the beatnik atmosphere of the 1960s, and he heard the Afro-Cuban jazz and Latin music developing on the Lower East Side. He moved to California for college, and joined the U.S. Air Force, earning the rank of sergeant. He later lived in Topanga Canyon, California.

== Career ==
Naser drummed on Arabic percussion instruments from early childhood, and received an oud as a gift when he was seven years old. He played the oud and various drums without taking lessons. He was in a rock and roll band in the 1960s in his early teens, the band winning a contest to play regularly at the House of Liverpool in Yonkers, where they also backed musical acts from the UK who arrived without a full band. Naser said, "We did it for a whole summer, the experience of a lifetime."

Naser broke into the Los Angeles music scene by impressing Lebanese singer Samira Tewfik with his unusual rhythmic style in July 1970 when she was auditioning musicians for an appearance in Pasadena, California.

Naser collaborated with multi-instrumentalist David Lindley in the early 1990s. They produced two "official bootleg" albums, Live in Tokyo Playing Real Good and Live All Over the Place Playing Even Better, released on Lindley's own Pleemhead label. Paul Harrar of The Union called the duo "One of the finest jam sessions in the music business." Their album Live in Tokyo was chosen by Guitar Player magazine as one of the top 100 albums of the last decade.

Naser was featured on Hamza El Din's album A Wish which topped the World Music charts. He toured the war-torn Middle East with Israeli singer-songwriter David Broza to promote peace through music, a mission very close to Hani's heart. They were invited by the Israeli and Jordanian Governments to perform in concert during the peace signing between the two countries.

Hani also led intensive workshops titled "The Healing Powers of Rhythm and Music" at the Esalen Institute and other places, and formed a band with Walfredo Reyes Jr., Armand Sabal-Lecco, and Craig Eastman.

== Death ==
Naser died in Ojai, California, on November 16, 2020. Guitarist Gayle Ellett of Djam Karet announced on Facebook on November 18, 2020, that his "great friend Hani Naser passed away this week." Ellett had participated many times in Naser's 10-piece band playing contemporary Arabic music and world music. His longtime partner Elise Mallove wrote an obituary for The Canyon Chronicle, saying he died "peacefully" but that his "heart could not bear the pain" of family members killed at their home by a gunman in Henderson, Nevada, on November 3, two weeks earlier. A memorial was held in Upland, California, followed by a gravesite funeral at Forest Lawn in Covina on December 10, 2020.
