= Matt Hubbard (musician) =

American musician (born 1970)

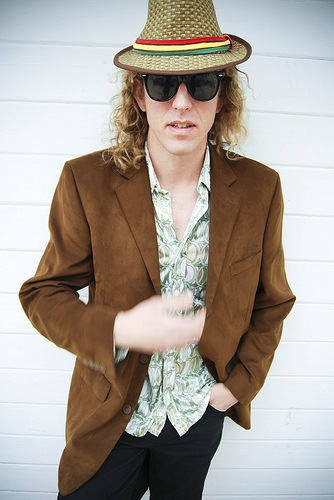

Background information
- Born: Matthew William Hubbard; December 22, 1970 (age 55)
- Genres: Country, Rock, R&B
- Occupation: Musician
- Instruments: Keyboards, trombone, harmonica, vocals
- Years active: 1990s-present
- Website: matthubbard.info

Matthew Hubbard (born December 22, 1970) is an American musician best known for his work with Willie Nelson and with the band 7 Walkers.

== Career ==
Matt Hubbard began his career by studying electronic music at Oberlin Conservatory. He began working with Willie Nelson in 1998 and has been running Nelson's home studio in Luck, TX since 2000. Matt co-produced Willie Nelson's "Rainbow Connection" (Island/Def Jam 2001) which was nominated for the Country Album of the Year Grammy Award. He has also done extensive work as a recording engineer and session musician playing keyboards, harmonica, trombone and other instruments. Some of the artists Matt has performed with and/or recorded include Ray Price, Archie Bell, Billy Bob Thornton, Papa Mali, Calvin Russell, Carolyn Wonderland, Black Joe Lewis & the Honeybears, and World Idol winner Kurt Nilsen. He played harmonica on Fastball's Keep Your Wig On and trombone and harmonium at their singer, keyboardist and bass guitarist Tony Scalzo's solo album My Favorite Year. He also played keyboards on the soundtrack for Babe: Pig in the City.

In 2009 he joined 7 Walkers, a band with former Grateful Dead drummer Bill Kreutzmann, Meters bassist George Porter Jr. and guitarist Papa Mali.
