= The Help Machine =

Studio album by Fastball
- Released: October 18, 2019
- Genre: Rock
- Length: 36 minutes
- Label: 33 1/3 Records
- Producer: Steve Berlin

Fastball chronology
Step Into Light (2017)	The Help Machine (2019)	Soundtrack - EP (2022)

Singles from The Help Machine
- 1. "The Help Machine" Released: 2018; 2. "White Collar" Released: 2019

Professional ratings
Review scores
Source	Rating
Allmusic	3.5/5 stars
The Austin Chronicle	3/4 stars
The Alternate Root	4/4 stars

The Help Machine is the seventh studio album by American rock band Fastball.

== Background ==
The album was produced by Steve Berlin of Los Lobos, who personally selected the tracks for the album from a list of songs provided to him by members Tony Scalzo and Miles Zuniga. Berlin recruited bassist Bruce Hughes, This freed Scalzo to concentrate on keyboards and guitar.

This album marks the first time since The Harsh Light of Day that a Fastball album does not feature songs co-written by Scalzo and Zuniga.

The first single off of the album, "The Help Machine", addresses the effects of consumerism. According to Zuniga, "[the song is] just about emptiness and the feeling that things that are supposed to make us happy don't."

== Critical reception ==
Described as "ethereal", the album also features the band's signature sound with comparisons to Elvis Costello and the Beatles. Pop Matters magazine referred to the album as "pop perfection." The album features a "thick modern sound" and is considered to be a great introduction to the band's catalog. Critics called the album "near perfect" and considered it one of the best albums of 2019.

To support the album, Tony Scalzo and Miles Zuniga performed live tracks for Paste Magazine.

== Track listing ==
1. "Friend or Foe" (Miles Zuniga) – 3:56
2. "White Collar" (Tony Scalzo) – 3:31
3. "Holding the Devil's Hand" (Miles Zuniga) – 3:12
4. "Redeemed" (Miles Zuniga) – 3:04
5. "All Gone Fuzzy" (Tony Scalzo) – 3:17
6. "The Help Machine" (Miles Zuniga) – 4:14
7. "Surprise Surprise" (Miles Zuniga) – 3:32
8. "The Girl You Pretended to Be" (Tony Scalzo) – 2:18
9. "I Go South" (Miles Zuniga) – 2:31
10. "Doesn't It Make You Feel Small" (Tony Scalzo) – 2:56
11. "Never Say Never" (Miles Zuniga) – 3:11

== Personnel ==
- Tony Scalzo – vocals, bass guitar, keyboards, guitar
- Miles Zuniga – vocals, guitar
- Joey Shuffield – drums, percussion

Guest musicians

- Andy Steck – drums, wurlitzer, juno (track 6), e-bow, piano (track 1)
- Bruce Hughes – bass guitar, additional vocals
- Charlie Sexton – guitar (track 8)
- Gordy Quist – additional vocals
- John Chipman – drums (track 1)
- Kevin McKinney – guitar (track 10)
- Steve Berlin – percussion
