= Bad Things (Machine Gun Kelly and Camila Cabello song) =

Single by Machine Gun Kelly and Camila Cabello

from the album Bloom
- Released: October 14, 2016
- Recorded: 2016
- Studio: Interscope (Santa Monica, CA)
- Genre: Pop-rap
- Length: 3:59
- Label: EST 19XX; Bad Boy; Interscope
- Songwriters: Colson Baker; Camila Cabello; Madison Love; Tony Scalzo; Joe Khajadourian; Alex Schwartz
- Producer: The Futuristics

Machine Gun Kelly singles chronology
| "Young Man" (2016) | "Bad Things" (2016) | "No More Sad Songs" (2017) |

Camila Cabello singles chronology
| "I Know What You Did Last Summer" (2015) | "Bad Things" (2016) | "Love Incredible" (2017) |

Music video
- "Bad Things" on YouTube

"Bad Things" is a song by American rapper Machine Gun Kelly and American singer Camila Cabello. It was released through EST 19XX, Bad Boy, and Interscope Records on October 14, 2016, as the lead single of Kelly's third studio album, Bloom. The song was produced by the Futuristics. Its music video was directed by Hannah Lux Davis and premiered on December 1. The song is a remake of Fastball's 1999 single "Out of My Head".

"Bad Things" peaked at number four on the US Billboard Hot 100, becoming both Kelly and Cabello's first top ten single as solo artists, as well as the former's only top-ten hit to date. The song also reached the top ten in Malaysia. It was certified five-times Platinum in the US and Gold or higher in eight additional countries. "Bad Things" was nominated for Top Rap Collaboration at the 2017 Billboard Music Awards, and won Best Collaboration at the 2017 Radio Disney Music Awards.

== Background and composition ==
During her time as a student at New York University (NYU), American songwriter Madison Love conceived "Bad Things" with several songwriters while she was in a physics class. "Bad Things" is a mid-tempo ballad that interpolates "Out of My Head" (1999) by Fastball. It incorporates lyrical themes of pain-is-pleasure type of love.

== Critical reception ==
Gil Kaufman from Billboard called "Bad Things" an "instant earworm four-minute ode to dark pleasure." For Fuse TV's Bianca Gracie the song shows rapper's "softer side", and highlights Cabello's "delicate vocals". She described the song opens with Cabello "softly crooning" the hook, and MGK then comes in with a "naughty rap flow that cruises over the piano melody."

== Chart performance ==
"Bad Things" debuted at number 80 on the US Billboard Hot 100 issued for November 5, 2016. On December 24, 2016, the song moved from number 17 to number 10 and became Kelly's first (and only as of 2024) top-10 entry, and Cabello's first as a soloist, selling 58,000 digital downloads and earning 11.4 million streams. It peaked at number four in its 13th week on the chart and spent 23 weeks in total. The Recording Industry Association of America (RIAA) certified the single 5× platinum, which denotes five million units based on sales and track-equivalent on-demand streams. On the Canadian Hot 100, "Bad Things" peaked at number 11.

The song reached number 22 in Australia and was certified quadruple platinum. In New Zealand, it peaked at number 11 and was certified gold. "Bad Things" reached number 16 in the United Kingdom and was certified gold. In Belgium, the song peaked at number 23 and was certified gold. It reached number 47 in Italy and attained a gold certification. "Bad Things" charted within the top 20 of national record charts, at number six in Malaysia, number 13 in the Netherlands, number 14 in Scotland, number 16 in Czech Republic, and number 19 in Finland, Lebanon, Portugal.

== Music video ==
Directed by Hannah Lux Davis, the music video premiered on December 1, 2016, on Vevo. It follows the pair as they lead a somewhat adventurous lifestyle, where they burn trash in barrels, steal, and make out in a barren apartment. MGK is the resident bad boy, getting into fights and racing cars while Cabello stays faithfully by his side. At one point in the video, flashbacks to younger versions of the musicians appear reassuring that their bond really has been unbreakable from the start. MGK and Cabello can be seen enjoying late nights at diners, gathering with friends and getting into trouble all while snuggling and fighting along the way. Their rebellious ways as the pair are chased by police after attempting to steal a car. Stuck at the top of a building with the police hot on their trail and nowhere else to go, the pair decide to die together by committing lover's suicide. As MGK looks longingly at Cabello, the police and their helicopters arrive to apprehend the couple and the lovers join hands and the video ends, leaving the outcome unknown.

As of May 2025, the music video for "Bad Things" has over 515 million views on YouTube.

== Live performances ==
MGK and Cabello performed the song on various talk shows, including The Tonight Show Starring Jimmy Fallon on November 23, 2016, and on December 1, 2016, for The Late Late Show with James Corden. They later performed the song on January 30, 2017, on The Ellen DeGeneres Show following Cabello's exit from girl group Fifth Harmony.

The song was then performed at the 30th Annual Nickelodeon Kids' Choice Awards on Nickelodeon on March 11, 2017.

Cabello also performed her verse as a support act at Taylor Swift's Reputation tour at Wembley Stadium, London on June 23, 2018.

== Accolades ==
| Year | Organization | Award | Result | Ref. |
|---|---|---|---|---|
| 2017 | Billboard Music Awards | Top Rap Collaboration | Nominated | |
| 2017 | Radio Disney Music Awards | Best Collaboration | Won | |

== Credits and personnel ==
Credits were adapted from the liner notes of Bloon.

=== Publishing ===
- For Casie Publishing / KOBALT (BMI) // Schweezy Beats Publishing (ASCAP) Artist Publishing Group West (ASCAP) Admin by Warner Chappell // Panic Attack Publishing (ASCAP) / Artist Publishing Group West (ASCAP) / Admin by Warner Chappell // Live Mad Love / Artist Publishing Group West (ASCAP) Admin by Warner Chappell // Sony/ATV Songs, LLC (BMI) // Bible Black c/o The Bicycle Music Company, Inc. (ASCAP).

=== Recording ===
- Recorded at Interscope Recording Studios, Santa Monica, California
- Mixed at Larrabee Studios, West Hollywood, California

=== Personnel ===
- Machine Gun Kelly – songwriting, lead vocals
- Camila Cabello – songwriting, lead vocals
- The Futuristics – songwriting, production, recording
- Madison Love – songwriting
- Tony Scalzo – songwriting
- Matt Beckley – recording
- Manny Marroquin – mixing

== Charts ==
=== Weekly charts ===
Weekly chart positions
| Chart (2016–17) | Peak position |
|---|---|
| Australia (ARIA) | 22 |
| Austria (Ö3 Austria Top 40) | 48 |
| Belgium (Ultratop 50 Flanders) | 23 |
| Belgium (Ultratip Bubbling Under Wallonia) | 22 |
| Canada Hot 100 (Billboard) | 11 |
| Colombia (National-Report) | 86 |
| Czech Republic Airplay (ČNS IFPI) | 16 |
| Czech Republic Singles Digital (ČNS IFPI) | 21 |
| Euro Digital Songs (Billboard) | 15 |
| Finland (Suomen virallinen lista) | 19 |
| France (SNEP) | 103 |
| Germany (GfK) | 58 |
| Hungary (Stream Top 40) | 27 |
| Ireland (IRMA) | 21 |
| Italy (FIMI) | 47 |
| Lebanon (Lebanese Top 20) | 19 |
| Malaysia (RIM) | 6 |
| Mexico Airplay (Billboard) | 30 |
| Netherlands (Dutch Top 40) | 13 |
| Netherlands (Single Top 100) | 15 |
| New Zealand (Recorded Music NZ) | 11 |
| Poland Airplay (ZPAV) | 53 |
| Portugal (AFP) | 19 |
| Scottish Singles Sales (Official Charts) | 14 |
| Slovakia Singles Digital (ČNS IFPI) | 39 |
| Sweden (Sverigetopplistan) | 36 |
| Switzerland (Schweizer Hitparade) | 43 |
| UK Singles (Official Charts) | 16 |
| US Billboard Hot 100 | 4 |
| US Adult Top 40 (Billboard) | 31 |
| US Dance Airplay (Billboard) | 4 |
| US Latin Airplay (Billboard) | 39 |
| US Hot R&B/Hip-Hop Songs (Billboard) | 2 |
| US Hot Rap Songs (Billboard) | 2 |
| US Pop Airplay (Billboard) | 1 |
| US Rhythmic Airplay (Billboard) | 1 |

=== Year-end charts ===
Year-end chart positions
| Chart (2017) | Position |
|---|---|
| Canada (Canadian Hot 100) | 65 |
| Netherlands (Dutch Top 40) | 83 |
| US Billboard Hot 100 | 41 |
| US Dance/Mix Show Airplay (Billboard) | 18 |
| US Hot R&B/Hip-Hop Songs (Billboard) | 20 |
| US Mainstream Top 40 (Billboard) | 18 |
| US Rhythmic (Billboard) | 13 |

== Certifications ==
Certifications and sales
| Region | Certification | Certified units/sales |
|---|---|---|
| Australia (ARIA) | 4× Platinum | 280,000^{‡} |
| Belgium (BRMA) | Gold | 10,000^{‡} |
| Brazil (Pro-Música Brasil) | 2× Platinum | 120,000^{‡} |
| Italy (FIMI) | Gold | 25,000^{‡} |
| New Zealand (RMNZ) | 2× Platinum | 60,000^{‡} |
| Norway (IFPI Norway) | Gold | 30,000^{‡} |
| Portugal (AFP) | Gold | 5,000^{‡} |
| United Kingdom (BPI) | Platinum | 600,000^{‡} |
| United States (RIAA) | 5× Platinum | 5,000,000^{‡} |
^{‡} Sales+streaming figures based on certification alone.
