= The Harsh Light of Day =

Studio album by Fastball
- Released: September 19, 2000
- Studios: A&M Studios, Hollywood
- Genres: Rock, pop rock, power pop
- Length: 42:21
- Label: Hollywood
- Producers: Julian Raymond, Fastball

Fastball chronology
All the Pain Money Can Buy (1998)	The Harsh Light of Day (2000)	Painting the Corners: The Best of Fastball (2002)

Professional ratings
Aggregate scores
Source	Rating
Metacritic	64/100
Review scores
Source	Rating
AllMusic	3/5 stars
Entertainment Weekly	B−
Rolling Stone	3/5 stars
Spin	6/10
Wall of Sound	68/100

The Harsh Light of Day is the third studio album by pop-rock band Fastball, released in September 2000 by Hollywood Records. It contained the single release "You're an Ocean," which spent eight weeks on the Billboard Bubbling Under chart and peaked at #101 during the fall of 2000. It also reached #25 on Radio & Records.

The album had a distinctly more layered and glossier sound than past albums, and featured guest appearances by Billy Preston, Brian Setzer and Michael Ward. However, despite positive reviews and extensive touring and promotional activity, the album failed to match the success of its predecessor, and would be the band's last studio effort for Hollywood Records.

Miles Zuniga left the band briefly following the completion of promotional duties for The Harsh Light of Day, and moved to Nashville, Tennessee, but re-joined the band soon afterwards.

Fastball appeared on an episode of Charmed, where "You're an Ocean" played at Piper's night club. "You're an Ocean" is also heard in the opening scene of the 2001 Disney Channel Original Movie Motocrossed.

As of January 2004, sales for this album were at 85,000.

The song "Morning Star" is played in the title sequence of the video game Triple Play Baseball.

== Track listing ==
1. "This Is Not My Life" (Miles Zuniga) – 3:00
2. "You're an Ocean" (Tony Scalzo) – 3:17
3. "Goodbye" (Zuniga) – 3:13
4. "Love Is Expensive and Free" (Scalzo) – 3:02
5. "Vampires" (Zuniga) – 3:10
6. "Wind Me Up" (Scalzo) – 3:59
7. "Morning Star" (Scalzo) – 3:59
8. "Time" (Zuniga) – 3:16
9. "Dark Street" (Zuniga) – 3:28
10. "Funny How It Fades Away" (Scalzo) – 4:08
11. "Don't Give Up On Me" (Zuniga) – 3:33
12. "Whatever Gets You On" (Zuniga, Jeff Groves) – 4:06

=== Bonus tracks ===
1. "The Way" (Scalzo) (live)
2. "Emotional" (Zuniga)
3. "Love Doesn't Kill You" (demo) (Scalzo)

== Personnel ==
Fastball

- Tony Scalzo – vocals, bass guitar, keyboards, guitar
- Miles Zuniga – vocals, guitar
- Joey Shuffield – drums, percussion
