= Rainbow Connection (album) =

Studio album by Willie Nelson
- Released: June 12, 2001
- Studio: Pedernales Recording (Spicewood, Texas)
- Genre: Country
- Label: Island
- Producer: Matt Hubbard, Amy Nelson, David Zettner, Willie Nelson

Willie Nelson chronology
Milk Cow Blues (2000)	Rainbow Connection (2001)	The Great Divide (2002)

Professional ratings
Review scores
Source	Rating
AllMusic	3/5 stars
Robert Christgau	A−
The New Rolling Stone Album Guide	3.5/5 stars

Rainbow Connection is the 49th studio album by country singer Willie Nelson. It was recorded in December 2000 and January 2001 at Willie's ranch near Spicewood, Texas. Willie’s daughter Amy Nelson was just five years old when she first heard Kermit the Frog sing “Rainbow Connection” in The Muppet Movie, and she spent the next twenty years trying to talk her dad into recording it. In 2001, he finally did, with Amy co-producing.

Rainbow Connection was nominated for the 44th Grammy Award for Best Country Album.

== Track listing ==
1. "Rainbow Connection" (Paul Williams, Kenneth Ascher) – 4:29
2. "I'm Looking Over a Four-Leaf Clover" (Mort Dixon, Harry Woods) – 2:30
3. "Ol' Blue" (Traditional) – 2:36
4. "Wise Old Me" (Amy Nelson) – 4:14
5. "Won't You Ride in My Little Red Wagon" (Rex Griffin) – 1:28
6. "Playmate" (Henry W. Petrie) – 1:37
7. "I'm My Own Grandpa" (Dwight Latham, Moe Jaffe) – 3:19
8. "Rock Me to Sleep" (Tom Hunter) – 3:16
9. "Playin' Dominoes and Shootin' Dice" (Tex Woods, O.D. Dobbs) – 2:46
10. "Wouldn't Have It Any Other Way" (Willie Nelson) – 1:55
11. "Outskirts of Town" (Casey Bill Weldon) – 7:20
12. "Just Dropped In (To See What Condition My Condition Was In)" (Mickey Newbury) – 3:42
13. "The Thirty-Third of August" (Mickey Newbury)– 4:33

== Personnel ==
- Willie Nelson – Guitar, vocals
- Matt Hubbard – Harmonica, electric bass, bongos, keyboards, electric piano
- Amy Nelson – Vocals, background vocals, vocal harmony
- Lana Nelson – Vocals
- George Fowler – Background vocals
- Paula Nelson – Vocals
- Gabe Rhodes – Guitar
- David Zettner – Pedal steel, electric bass, guitar

== Chart performance ==
Chart (2001)	Peak position
U.S. Billboard Top Country Albums	52
