= 7 Walkers (album) =

Studio album by 7 Walkers
- Released: November 2, 2010
- Recorded: 2010
- Genre: Rock
- Length: 64:38
- Label: Response
- Producer: Papa Mali

Bill Kreutzmann chronology
Trichromes (2002)	7 Walkers (2010)

7 Walkers is an album by the rock band 7 Walkers. The group's only album, it was released on CD and LP on November 2, 2010.

The band 7 Walkers was formed in 2009 by former Grateful Dead drummer Bill Kreutzmann and guitarist and singer Malcolm Welbourne, better known as Papa Mali, along with multi-instrumentalist Matt Hubbard and bass player Reed Mathis. In 2010, after most of the tracks for their debut album had been recorded, Mathis went back to touring with his main band, Tea Leaf Green, and was replaced by George Porter Jr., former bassist of the Meters. Porter appears on one track of the album.

The lyrics for most of the songs on 7 Walkers were written by Robert Hunter, who wrote the words for many Grateful Dead songs. Willie Nelson plays guitar and sings on one track, "King Cotton Blues".

According to the Austin Chronicle, "Kreutzmann refers to the music of 7 Walkers as 'swampadelic,' a natural meeting point between his West Coast psychedelia and Welbourne's voodoo-funk. Theirs is a saga of friendship and good fortune, set in the bayou but firmly entrenched in Austin." The album is dedicated to the state of Louisiana and the city of New Orleans.

== Critical reception ==
In Billboard, Gary Graff wrote, "... in 7 Walkers, Dead percussionist Bill Kreutzmann has hit pay dirt. The well-credentialed group — fronted by Louisiana singer/guitarist Papa Mali and now including Meters bassist George Porter (who appears on only one of the debut album's 13 tracks) — plays it loose and rootsy in a manner Deadheads will certainly find appealing, especially with Robert Hunter writing lyrics.... A fine soundtrack for Louisiana's continuing return to glory."

In JamBase, Dennis Cook wrote, "7 Walkers... is the most organic, original music to come out of the core Grateful Dead alumni since the passing of Jerry Garcia. It's worth getting right down to brass tacks since 7 Walkers goes for the creative jugular in such a lusty, exuberant manner. With richly imaginative lyrics penned by Dead scribe Robert Hunter... Even on paper this quartet is lethal, but that's nothing compared to the roiling energy when they come together in the flesh. With their collective pedigree, there's an enormous pool of possibilities and their self-titled debut reflects all their swirling undercurrents and coalesces into fascinating new shapes, fresh colors forming on the surface of things as dark, interesting eddies move below. Put another way, there's something powerful and primal and beautiful going on in the music of 7 Walkers."

In All About Jazz, Nick DeRiso wrote, "Grateful Dead co-founder Bill Kreutzmann, great groovy Meters bassman George Porter Jr. and hoodoo guitarist Papa Mali have joined together to form 7 Walkers, a rousing fusion of Bay area jam-rock with greasy New Orleans rhythm and blues.... Together, they often stir up powerful memories of Kreutzmann's old band — from the mystical '7 Walkers', which gave the band its name, to 'Evangeline', where Kreutzmann does such a sensitive turn at the drums. But 7 Walkers never settle, and never settle in...."

== Track listing ==
1. "WYAT Radio / Cane River Waltz" (Malcolm Welbourne) – 0:33
2. "Sue From Bogalusa" (Robert Hunter, Welbourne, Bill Kreutzmann) – 3:30
3. "King Cotton Blues" (Hunter, Welbourne, Kreutzmann, Matt Hubbard) – 8:34
4. "(For the Love of) Mr. Okra" (Welbourne, Kreutzmann, Hubbard, Reed Mathis) – 3:12
5. "Chingo!" (Hunter, Welbourne, Kreutzmann, George Porter Jr.) – 7:20
6. "Louisiana Rain" (Hunter, Welbourne, Kreutzmann) – 8:07
7. "Someday You'll See (Prelude)" (Welbourne) – 4:02
8. "New Orleans Crawl" (Hunter, Welbourne, Kreutzmann) – 5:46
9. "Evangeline" (Hunter, Welbourne, Kreutzmann) – 8:24
10. "Hey Bo Diddle" (Hunter, Welbourne, Kreutzmann) – 4:54
11. "Airline Highway" (Welbourne, Kreutzmann, Hubbard, Mathis) – 1:16
12. "Someday You'll See" (Welbourne) – 3:03
13. "7 Walkers" (Hunter, Welbourne, Kreutzmann, Hubbard, Mathis) – 5:53

== Personnel ==
=== 7 Walkers ===
- Bill Kreutzmann – drums, percussion
- Papa Mali – guitar, vocals
- Matt Hubbard – keyboards, harmonica, trombone, backing vocals
- Reed Mathis – bass
- George Porter Jr. – bass on "Chingo!"

=== Additional musicians ===
- Willie Nelson – guitar, vocals on "King Cotton Blues"
- John Bush – percussion on "Chingo!"
- Jane Bond – backing vocals on "New Orleans Crawl"
- Steve Johnson – saxophone, trumpet on "New Orleans Crawl"

=== Production ===
- Papa Mali – producer, mixing
- Matt Hubbard – engineer
- JT Holt – assistant engineer
- Jim Wilson – mastering
- Jay Blakesberg – photography
- Alexandra Fischer – graphic design
- Mike Egan – cover art
- recorded to analog tape at the Nest, Austin, Texas
