= My Favorite Year (album) =

Studio album by Tony Scalzo
- Released: 29 April 2013 (digital download); 21 May 2013 (CD)
- Recorded: 2012 on Practise, Inc., Austin, Texas; The Doghouse, Manor, Texas (Ian McLagan's organ)
- Genre: Rock, pop rock, indie rock, alternative rock
- Label: East Liberty Records
- Producer: Stephen Belans

My Favorite Year is the debut solo album by American singer, guitarist and keyboardist Tony Scalzo of Fastball fame. It was engineered by Joe Blaney, who helped to engineer The Clash's fifth album Combat Rock. Work on the album started in 2011, when Tony started a Kickstarter program. According to Tony, the songs he co-wrote with his Fastball colleague Miles Zuniga were originally created as Fastball tracks, but were not included in any of the band's records. He defined the genre of the album as "melodic pop".

== Track listing ==
All tracks are written by Tony Scalzo, except where noted

| No. | Title | Length |
|---|---|---|
| 1. | "Love Lost" | 2:39 |
| 2. | "Regretfully" | 2:36 |
| 3. | "Don't Let Anyone" | 3:27 |
| 4. | "Halfway Girl" | 3:54 |
| 5. | "Ziggy" (Scalzo, Chris Stills, Miles Zuniga) | 3:40 |
| 6. | "Reality" (Scalzo, Tucker Livingston) | 2:36 |
| 7. | "Free World" (Scalzo, Britt Daniel, Zuniga) | 3:25 |
| 8. | "Looks Like I've Thrown it All Away" (Scalzo, Cory Glaeser) | 3:23 |
| 9. | "Par for the Course" | 3:10 |
| 10. | "Bed I Made" | 4:09 |
| 11. | "Forever Girl" | 2:28 |
| 12. | "Last Word" | 3:04 |

== Personnel ==
- Tony Scalzo – vocals, background vocals, acoustic guitar, bass, piano, guitar, Wurlitzer electric piano
- Stephen Belans – drums, percussion, production
- Jon Sanchez – additional guitars on all tracks except "Don't Let Anyone", "Halfway Girl", "Reality", "Par for the Course" and "Bed I Made"; Kaossilator on "Looks Like I've Thrown it All Away"
- Billy Cassis – additional guitars on "Don't Let Anyone", "Reality", "Looks Like I've Thrown it All Away", "Forever Girl", and "Last Word"
- Darin Murphy – background vocals on "Love Lost", "Reality", "Bed I Made", "Forever Girl", and "Last Word"
- Ian McLagan – Hammond B3 on "Forever Girl"
- Matt Hubbard – trombone and harmonium on "Free World"
- Steve Johnson – saxophone on "Free World"
- Andrew Noble, Luke Wollenzien and Annie Benavides – violins on "Halfway Girl"
- Dixie Yoder and Tom Strauch – violas on "Halfway Girl"
- Colin Ferguson and Rachel Horvitz – cellos on "Halfway Girl"

Technical staff

- Joe Blaney – mixing
- Ryan Smith and Dave McNair – mastering
- Jeremy The Artist – portraits
- Matt Eskey – design
