= Make Your Mama Proud =

Studio album by Fastball
- Released: April 6, 1996
- Recorded: 1996
- Genre: Rock, pop punk
- Length: 35:46
- Label: Hollywood
- Producer: Jerry Finn

Fastball chronology
Make Your Mama Proud (1996)	All the Pain Money Can Buy (1998)

Professional ratings
Review scores
Source	Rating
AllMusic	3/5 stars
The Rolling Stone Album Guide	2.5/5 stars

Make Your Mama Proud is the debut album released by the rock band Fastball. The track "Are You Ready For The Fallout?" was issued to some radio stations as the single for the record.

The album had sold over 5,500 copies as of April 1998.

== Critical reception ==
Trouser Press wrote that Fastball "never sacrifices melody to haste, and the results bounce with nifty, cheek-poking ease."

== Track listing ==
#	Title	Length	Music
1	Human Torch	2:40	Tony Scalzo
2	She Comes ‘Round	3:27	Miles Zuniga
3	Make Your Mama Proud	2:10	Tony Scalzo
4	Back Door	2:20	Miles Zuniga
5	Are You Ready for the Fallout?	3:13	Tony Scalzo
6	Nothing	1:51	Tony Scalzo
7	Boomerang	2:57	Miles Zuniga
8	Eater	2:42	Tony Scalzo
9	Knock It Down	2:08	Miles Zuniga
10	Lender	1:58	Tony Scalzo
11	Altamont	3:08	Miles Zuniga
12	Emily	2:07	Tony Scalzo
13	Seattle	2:49	Miles Zuniga
14	Telephone Calls	2:14	Tony Scalzo

== Personnel ==
- Tony Scalzo - vocals, bass guitar, keyboards, guitar
- Miles Zuniga - vocals, guitar
- Joey Shuffield - drums, percussion
