= Step Into Light =

Studio album by Fastball
- Released: May 19, 2017
- Genres: Rock; pop rock; power pop
- Length: 31 minutes
- Label: 33 1/3 Records
- Producers: Fastball; Chris "Frenchie" Smith (tracks 1–4, 6–12); Mike McCarthy (track 5)

Fastball chronology
| Little White Lies (2009) | Step Into Light (2017) | The Help Machine (2019) |

Singles from Step Into Light
- 1. "We're on Our Way" Released: 2017; 2. "Behind the Sun" Released: 2017; 3. "I Will Never Let You Down" Released: 2017; 4. "Best Friend" Released: 2017

Professional ratings
Review scores
| Source | Rating |
|---|---|
| AllMusic | 4/5 stars |
| The Austin Chronicle | 3.5/5 stars |
| QRO Magazine | 7.6/10 |
| Paste | 7.8/10 |
| Cryptic Rock | 5/5 stars |

Step Into Light is the sixth studio album by American rock band Fastball and called "the must have album of the summer [of 2017]." Their first album since 2009, it was released in 2017. The album was recorded over a two-week period. The album was produced by the band, Chris "Frenchie" Smith, and mixed by Bob Clearmountain.

== Recording history ==
Some songs appearing on the album were written in the years between Fastball albums. A version of "Secret Agent Love" was produced by Adam Schlesinger, but was re-recorded for the album. Initial recording sessions started in February 2015 at the Bubble in Austin, Texas.

"Love Comes in Waves" was recorded and issued as a single in 2015.

== Track listing ==
1. "We're on Our Way" (Kevin Lovejoy, Miles Zuniga) – 2:44
2. "Best Friend" (Zuniga, Tony Scalzo) – 3:21
3. "Behind the Sun" (Zuniga) – 2:03
4. "I Will Never Let You Down" (Scalzo) – 2:38
5. "Love Comes in Waves" (Zuniga) – 2:51
6. "Step Into Light" (Zuniga) – 2:16
7. "Just Another Dream" (Scalzo) – 2:57
8. "Tanzania" (Zuniga) – 1:56
9. "Secret Agent Love (Scalzo) – 2:46
10. "Hung Up" (Zuniga) – 2:28
11. "Don't Give Up On Me" (Zuniga, Scalzo) – 2:19
12. "Frenchy and the Punk" (Zuniga) – 2:31

== Personnel ==
Fastball

- Tony Scalzo - vocals, bass guitar, keyboards, guitar
- Miles Zuniga - vocals, guitar
- Joey Shuffield - drums, percussion
