= Keep Your Wig On =

Studio album by Fastball
- Released: June 8, 2004
- Recorded: 2004
- Genre: Rock; power pop
- Length: 39:46
- Label: Rykodisc
- Producer: Mike McCarthy

Fastball chronology
Live From Jupiter Records (2003)	Keep Your Wig On (2004)	Little White Lies (2009)

Professional ratings
Review scores
Source	Rating
AllMusic	4/5 stars
Rolling Stone	2/5 stars

Keep Your Wig On is the fourth studio album released by the rock band Fastball. It was released by the indie label Rykodisc and the record was mixed by Bob Clearmountain. Adam Schlesinger produced Someday and Red Light during the band's New York recording sessions.

== Track listing ==
#	Title	Length	Music
1	"Shortwave"	1:13	Miles Zuniga
2	"Lou-ee, Lou-ee"	2:52	Tony Scalzo, Miles Zuniga
3	"Drifting Away"	3:46	Tony Scalzo
4	"Airstream"	3:29	Al Anderson, Miles Zuniga
5	"I Get High"	3:35	Tony Scalzo, Miles Zuniga
6	"Perfect World"	3:35	Miles Zuniga
7	"’Till I Get It Right"	4:55	Tony Scalzo, Miles Zuniga
8	"Our Misunderstanding"	3:20	Tony Scalzo, Jeff Trott, Miles Zuniga
9	"Someday"	3:24	Miles Zuniga
10	"Mercenary Girl"	2:41	Tony Scalzo, Miles Zuniga
11	"Falling Upstairs"	3:36	Tony Scalzo, Miles Zuniga
12	"Red Light"	3:17	Tony Scalzo, Miles Zuniga

- The European version of Keep Your Wig On has a bonus track, "High Low".

== Personnel ==
Fastball

- Tony Scalzo - vocals, bass guitar, keyboards, guitar
- Miles Zuniga - vocals, guitar
- Joey Shuffield - drums, percussion

Guest musicians

- Jeff Groves - saxophone, backing vocals
- Kevin McKinney - bass guitar
- Mike McCarthy - tambourine
- Rob Seidenberg - bass guitar, guitar
- Dan McLoughlin - acoustic guitar
- Julian Raymond - backing vocals
- Brannen Temple - drums
- Alexandria Jackson - backing vocals
- Jennifer Hirsh - backing vocals
- Matt Hubbard - harmonica
- Jeff Trott - drum loops, bass guitar, guitar, backing vocals
- Kevin Lovejoy - keyboards, piano
- Louis Jay Myers - pedal steel guitar
