= Black Joe Lewis & the Honeybears =

American soul musical group

Black Joe Lewis
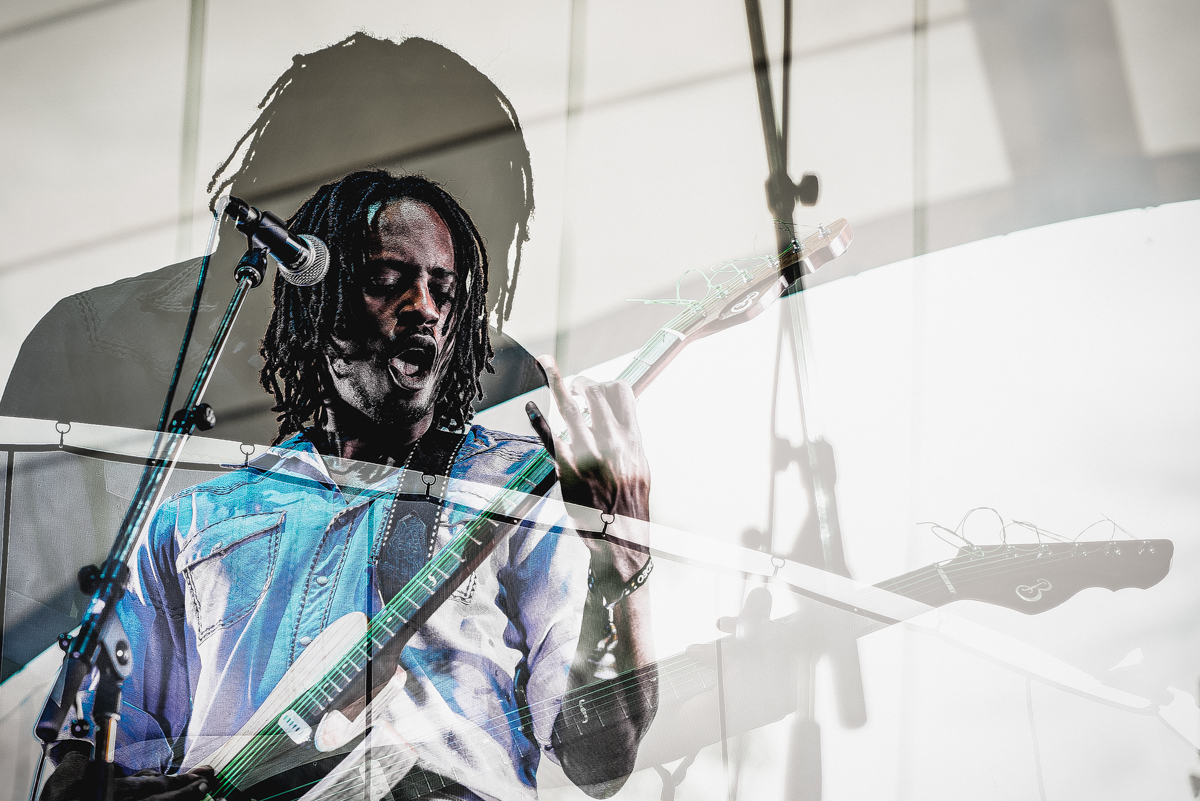

Background information
- Born: Tucson, Arizona, United States
- Origin: Austin, Texas, United States
- Genres: Blues, soul, rock and roll
- Years active: 2007–present
- Label: Lost Highway/Universal Motown
- Members: Joe Lewis; Bill Stevenson; Jason Frey; Derek Phelps; Joseph Woullard; Eduardo Torres
- Past members: Zach Ernst; Matthew Strmiska; Ian Varley; David McKnight; Eduardo Ramirez; Darren Sluyter
- Website: blackjoelewis.com

Black Joe Lewis (born Tucson, Arizona, United States) is an American blues, funk and soul artist influenced by Howlin' Wolf and James Brown. He formed Black Joe Lewis & The Honeybears in Austin, Texas, in 2007. In March 2009, Esquire listed Black Joe Lewis and the Honeybears as one of the "Ten Bands Set to Break Out at 2009's SXSW Festival."

== History ==
Joe Lewis first picked up the guitar while working at a pawn shop in Austin. He soon immersed himself in the local Red River blues/garage scene, recording and performing with Austin musicians, including the Weary Boys and Walter Daniels. The Brian Salvi-produced Black Joe Lewis and The Cold Breeze EP was released in 2005, with standout track "Bitch I Love You" featuring Matt Hubbard on Rhodes electric piano, and the album Black Joe Lewis in 2007, both released on Italian label Shake Yo Ass Records, after which the band gained critical national acclaim and toured as openers for Spoon and Okkervil River in 2007.

In 2008 the band signed to Lost Highway Records and performed at Lollapalooza and Austin City Limits Music Festival. They released a four-song EP on January 27, 2009. The album Tell 'Em What Your Name Is! was produced by Spoon's drummer Jim Eno and released on March 17, 2009.

Black Joe Lewis & the Honeybears have performed at music festivals including Bonnaroo, Coachella Valley Music and Arts Festival, Bumbershoot, Outside Lands Music and Arts Festival, Sasquatch! Music Festival, Wakarusa Music and Camping Festival, Musikfest, Latitude Festival, and Splendour in the Grass. The band has appeared on The Late Late Show with Craig Ferguson, Late Show with David Letterman, Austin City Limits, and Later... with Jools Holland. They were featured in Echotone, a 2010 documentary about the Austin, Texas, music scene.

On August 25, 2013, Joe Lewis said on NPR that he was trying to shed the 'Honeybears' portion of the band's name, and had never intended for it to continue for so long. In 2017, his album Backlash debuted at number 3 in the Billboard Top Blues Albums Chart.

== Discography ==
=== Studio albums ===
- Black Joe Lewis (2007, Weary Records)
- Tell 'Em What Your Name Is! (2009, Lost Highway Records/Universal Motown)
- Scandalous (2011, Lost Highway Records)
- Electric Slave (2013, Vagrant Records)
- Backlash (2017, INGrooves Music Group)
- The Difference Between Me & You (2018, Black Joe Lewis)

=== EPs ===
- Black Joe Lewis and the Cold Breeze (2005, Shake Yo Ass Records)
- Black Joe Lewis (2009, Lost Highway Records)

=== Singles ===
- "Boogaloo on Clark Street" - with The Soul Distributors (2011, Papa Bill Records)
- "Five Dollars" (2020)
