= All the Pain Money Can Buy =

Studio album by Fastball
- Released: March 10, 1998
- Recorded: 1997
- Genres: Alternative rock; power pop
- Length: 42:03
- Label: Hollywood
- Producers: Julian Raymond; Fastball

Fastball chronology
Make Your Mama Proud (1996)	All the Pain Money Can Buy (1998)	The Harsh Light of Day (2000)

Singles from All the Pain Money Can Buy
- 1. "The Way" Released: January 7, 1998; 2. "Fire Escape" Released: July 20, 1998; 3. "Out of My Head" Released: January 25, 1999

All the Pain Money Can Buy is the second studio album by American rock band Fastball, released on March 10, 1998, on Hollywood Records. The album includes the hit singles "The Way" (1998), "Fire Escape" (1998), and "Out of My Head" (1999). The album was certified gold by the Recording Industry Association of America (RIAA) in June 1998 and went Platinum in September of the same year, making it Fastball's most successful release.

== Background ==
Professional ratings
Review scores
Source	Rating
AllMusic	4/5 stars
Chicago Tribune	3.5/4 stars
Entertainment Weekly	A−
NME	5/10
Pitchfork	5.1/10
Q	3/5 stars
Rolling Stone	3/5 stars
The Times	8/10
Uncut	4/5 stars
The Village Voice	C+

Band member Miles Zuniga stated that the title "All the Pain Money Can Buy" was a bit of a commentary on how alternative rock bands after Nirvana disbanded often signed to major record labels and doing well, felt the need to manufacture or obsess over personal angst and self-loathing just to fit in with the "grungy".

The members of Fastball still had side jobs as late as January 1998. Tony Scalzo worked the graveyard shift at The Bagel Manufactory in Austin. He, Joey Shuffield, and Zuniga would be on The Tonight Show with Jay Leno and Late Night with Conan O'Brien just four months later. Fastball's second album, All the Pain Money Can Buy, was released on Hollywood Records. Within just six months, it had sold more than a million copies.

The single "The Way" stayed on top of Billboard's Modern Rock Tracks chart for seven weeks, and was a top-five hit on Billboard's Top 40 Mainstream chart. Scalzo was inspired to write the song in 1997 after reading a news article about Lela and Raymond Howard, an elderly couple who had disappeared in Texas. Though Lela had Alzheimer's and Raymond was recovering from brain surgery, the couple had been driving to a local festival. They were discovered two weeks later, dead, at the bottom of a ravine near Hot Springs, Arkansas, hundreds of miles off their intended route. Scalzo chose to imagine that they began reminiscing and decided to become ethereal beings on a permanent romantic trip, the answer to the song's question, "Where were they going without ever knowing the way?"

Fastball followed up "The Way" with a second single, "Fire Escape", and a third single, "Out of My Head", which reached the top ten on Billboard's Top 40 Mainstream chart and was a top ten hit on the Adult Top 40 chart for 29 weeks. The album's promotional tour featured Marcy Playground and Everclear, after which Fastball moved to the H.O.R.D.E. tour.

In 1999, Fastball received two Grammy Award nominations as a result of All the Pain Money Can Buy. One was for Best Rock Performance by a Duo or Group with Vocal for "The Way", and the other was for Best Long Form Music Video. They also received an MTV Video Music Award nomination for Best New Artist.

== Track listing ==
No.	Title	Writer(s)	Length
1.	"The Way"	Tony Scalzo	4:17
2.	"Fire Escape"	Miles Zuniga	3:21
3.	"Better Than It Was"	Scalzo	2:48
4.	"Which Way to the Top?" (featuring Poe)	Zuniga; Jeff Groves	3:50
5.	"Sooner or Later"	Zuniga	2:39
6.	"Warm Fuzzy Feeling"	Scalzo	1:55
7.	"Slow Drag"	Zuniga	3:37
8.	"G.O.D. (Good Old Days)"	Scalzo	3:31
9.	"Charlie, the Methadone Man"	Zuniga	3:17
10.	"Out of My Head"	Scalzo	2:32
11.	"Damaged Goods"	Zuniga	3:02
12.	"Nowhere Road"	Scalzo	3:25
13.	"Sweetwater, Texas"	Zuniga	3:53
Total length:			42:03

European release bonus tracks
No.	Title	Writer(s)	Length
14.	"Freeloader Freddy"	Scalzo	3:10
15.	"This Guy's in Love with You" (Herb Alpert cover)	Burt Bacharach; Hal David	3:33
16.	"Sweetwater, Texas" (Live)	Zuniga	4:16
Total length:			53:08

Australia limited edition bonus disc
No.	Title	Writer(s)	Length
1.	"Quit Your Job"	Scalzo	2:14
2.	"The Way" (Unpaved Acoustic Version)	Scalzo	3:43
3.	"Freeloader Freddy"	Scalzo	3:08
4.	"Fire Escape" (Live)	Zuniga	3:14
5.	"This Guy's in Love with You"	Bacharach; David	3:35

20th Anniversary Edition bonus tracks
No.	Title	Writer(s)	Length
14.	"Quit Your Job"	Scalzo	2:15
15.	"Freeloader Freddy"	Scalzo	3:09
16.	"The Way" (Cassette demo)	Scalzo	3:43
17.	"Fire Escape" (Demo)	Zuniga	3:32
18.	"Slow Drag" (Demo)	Zuniga	3:43
19.	"Sweetwater, Texas" (Demo)	Zuniga	3:17
20.	"Androgynous" (The Replacements cover)	Paul Westerberg	1:51
21.	"This Guy's in Love with You"	Bacharach; David	3:33
22.	"The Way" (Unpaved Acoustic Version)	Scalzo	3:43
Total length:			71:23

== Personnel ==
Credits are adapted from the album's liner notes.

Fastball

- Tony Scalzo – vocals (lead on 1, 3, 6, 8, 12), bass guitar, keyboards
- Miles Zuniga – vocals (lead on 2, 4, 5, 7, 9, 10, 11, 13), guitar
- Joey Shuffield – drums, percussion

Additional musicians

- Kim Bullard – organ, keyboards, programming
- Bennett Salvay – electric piano, horn arrangement
- Poe – vocals on "Which Way to the Top?"
- Walt Vincent – piano on "Sooner or Later"
- Guy Fantasy – background vocals on "Sooner or Later"
- Dennis Farias – trumpet on "G.O.D. (Good Old Days)"
- Rick Braun – trumpet on "G.O.D. (Good Old Days)"
- Nick Lane – trombone on "G.O.D. (Good Old Days)"
- Doug Norwine – tenor sax on "G.O.D. (Good Old Days)"
- Greg Smith – baritone sax on "G.O.D. (Good Old Days)"
- Erika Duke-Kirkpatrick – cello on "Charlie, the Methadone Man"

Production

- Joe Barresi – engineer
- Chris Lord-Alge – mixing

== Charts ==
Chart (1998)	Peak position
Australian Albums (ARIA)	84
Canadian Albums (Billboard)	18
Finnish Albums (Suomen virallinen lista)	28
Swedish Albums (Sverigetopplistan)	22
UK Albums (OCC)	108
US Billboard 200	29

== Certifications ==
Region	Certification	Certified units/sales
Canada (Music Canada)	Platinum	100,000^{^}
United States (RIAA)	Platinum	1,000,000^{^}
^{^} Shipments figures based on certification alone.
