= Out of My Head (Fastball song) =

1999 single by Fastball

Single by Fastball

from the album All the Pain Money Can Buy
- B-side: "Altamont"; "Human Torch"
- Released: January 25, 1999
- Studio: A&M (Hollywood)
- Genre: Alternative rock
- Length: 2:32
- Label: Hollywood
- Songwriter: Tony Scalzo
- Producers: Julian Raymond; Fastball

Fastball singles chronology
"Fire Escape" (1998)	"Out of My Head" (1999)	"You're an Ocean" (2000)

Music video
- "Out of My Head" on YouTube

"Out of My Head" is a song by the American band Fastball from their second studio album, All the Pain Money Can Buy (1998). The song is a rock ballad with gospel influence, dominated by Hammond organ and piano. Bassist Tony Scalzo is the lead singer on the song, with guitarist Miles Zuniga coming in with harmony during the last chorus. The song was serviced to American rock radio in January 1999 and to contemporary hit radio two months later.

"Out of My Head" peaked at number 20 on the US Billboard Hot 100, number 11 on the Canadian RPM 100 Hit Tracks chart, and number 19 on the Icelandic Singles Chart. A music video directed by Jim Gable features the band performing the song in sepia tone. In 2016, an adapted version of the chorus was used in the song "Bad Things" by Machine Gun Kelly and Camila Cabello from the album Bloom.

== Critical reception ==
Reviewing the song for Billboard, Chuck Taylor compared the track to material by the Partridge Family, citing its short length and "plucky, air-light" guitar riff. He wrote that the song was "ultra-simple and super-catchy", adding that although the song was too "lightweight" for rock radio, it "illustrates Fastball's consistent ability to combine obvious melodies with ear-plucking lyrics."

== Chart performance ==
In the United States, on the week of July 3, 1999, "Out of My Head" debuted at number 64 on the Billboard Hot 100, reaching its peak of number 20 nine weeks afterward, on September 4. It spent a total of 20 weeks on the Hot 100 and ended 1999 as the country's 88th-best-performing song. It also appeared on three other Billboard charts, peaking at number 14 on the Triple-A chart, number eight on the Mainstream Top 40, and number three on the Adult Top 40. On Canada's RPM 100 Hit Tracks chart, after debuting at number 44 on June 21, 1999, it climbed to number 11 on September 6, ending the year as Canada's 59th-most-successful hit. On the RPM Adult Contemporary listing, the single peaked at number 33 the following issue.

Worldwide, the song charted only in Australia and Iceland. In the latter country, "Out of My Head" debuted at number 22 on March 5, 1999. Two weeks later, it peaked at number 19 on the Íslenski Listinn Topp 40. In Australia, the song made its debut on July 19, 1999, peaking at number 65.

== Track listing ==
All songs were written by Tony Scalzo except "Altamont", written by Miles Zuniga.

Australian CD single

1. "Out of My Head"
2. "Altamont"
3. "Human Torch"

== Credits and personnel ==
Credits are adapted from the Australian CD single liner notes.

Studios

- Recorded at A&M Studios (Hollywood, California)
- Mixed at Image Recording Studios (Los Angeles, California)
- Mastered at Bernie Grundman Mastering (Hollywood, California)

Personnel

- Miles Zuniga – vocals, guitar
- Tony Scalzo – vocals, bass guitar
- Joey Shuffield – drums, percussion
- Bennett Salvay – piano, Hammond organ
- Joe Barresi – engineering
- Dave Reed – assistant engineering
- Chris Lord-Alge – mixing
- Brian Gardner – mastering

== Charts ==
=== Weekly charts ===
Chart (1999)	Peak position
Australia (ARIA)	65
Canada Top Singles (RPM)	11
Canada Adult Contemporary (RPM)	33
Iceland (Íslenski Listinn Topp 40)	19
US Billboard Hot 100	20
US Adult Alternative Airplay (Billboard)	14
US Adult Pop Airplay (Billboard)	3
US Pop Airplay (Billboard)	8

=== Year-end charts ===
Chart (1999)	Position
Canada Top Singles (RPM)	59
US Billboard Hot 100	88
US Adult Top 40 (Billboard)	10
US Mainstream Top 40 (Billboard)	30

== Release history ==
Region	Date	Format(s)	Label(s)	Ref.
United States	January 25, 1999	Active rock radio	Hollywood	
United States	March 30, 1999	Contemporary hit radio	Hollywood	
