= Little White Lies (album) =

Studio album by Fastball
- Released: April 14, 2009
- Recorded: 2008
- Genre: Rock
- Length: 37:04
- Producer: Miles Zuniga, CJ Eiriksson

Fastball chronology
Keep Your Wig On (2004)	Little White Lies (2009)	Step Into Light (2017)

Professional ratings
Review scores
Source	Rating
Allmusic	4/5 stars

Little White Lies is the fifth studio album by American rock band Fastball. It was released on April 14, 2009, and was recorded through the year 2008. It was originally to be released on March. It was produced by Miles Zuniga and CJ Eiriksson, mixed by Bob Clearmountain. It is their first album since 2004. The album is distributed by MRI/RED Distribution.

== Track listing ==
1. "All I Was Looking For Was You" (Miles Zuniga, Tony Scalzo) - 3:41
2. "Always Never" (Miles Zuniga, Tony Scalzo) - 3:08
3. "The Malcontent (The Modern World)" (Miles Zuniga, Tony Scalzo) - 3:10
4. "Little White Lies" (Miles Zuniga, Tony Scalzo, Ben Margulies) - 3:23
5. "Mono to Stereo" (Miles Zuniga, Tony Scalzo) - 3:34
6. "How Did I Get Here?" (Tony Scalzo, Kevin Brown)- 2:59
7. "We'll Always Have Paris" (Miles Zuniga) - 3:38
8. "Angelie" (Miles Zuniga, Athena Andreadis)- 3:55
9. "She's Got the Rain" (Miles Zuniga, Tony Scalzo, Ben Margulies) - 3:27
10. "Rampart Street" (Miles Zuniga, Tony Scalzo, Bruce Hughes) - 2:09
11. "White Noise" (Miles Zuniga, Tony Scalzo, Jeff Groves) - 2:44
12. "Soul Radio" (Miles Zuniga, Tony Scalzo) - 4:06

== Personnel ==
- Tony Scalzo - vocals, bass guitar, keyboards, guitar
- Miles Zuniga - vocals, guitar
- Joey Shuffield - drums, percussion
- Bruce Hughes - bass guitar, additional vocals
- Joseph Shuffield - violin (Tracks: 2, 12)
- Claude Bernard - accordion (Track: 8)
