= Tom Hunter (singer) =

Tom Hunter (14 September 1946 – 20 June 2008, Bellingham, Washington) was an American folk singer best known for his children songs, such as "My Washing Machine Eats Socks", "The Shirt Song" and "There's a Monster in My Closet". His best known song is "Rock Me to Sleep", about a man who is "tired of trying to figure things out, and tired of being so strong".

In 1978, Hunter wrote the song "Back to Work in Youngstown", about the closure of the steel mills in Youngstown, Ohio, on Black Monday.

His songs have been recorded by many artists, including Willie Nelson. In addition to being a folksinger, Hunter had a morning radio program in San Francisco, from 1979 to 1984, on KGO radio, called God Talk, and was co-founder and co-director of the Northwest Teachers Conference. Tom Hunter died of Creutzfeldt–Jakob disease. Washington State Governor Christine Gregoire designated 24 October 2008 as "Tom Hunter Day: A Day for Singing." while in 2013 the Massachusetts-based Children's Music Network posthumously awarded Hunter the Magic Penny Award.
