= Papa Mali =

American songwriter

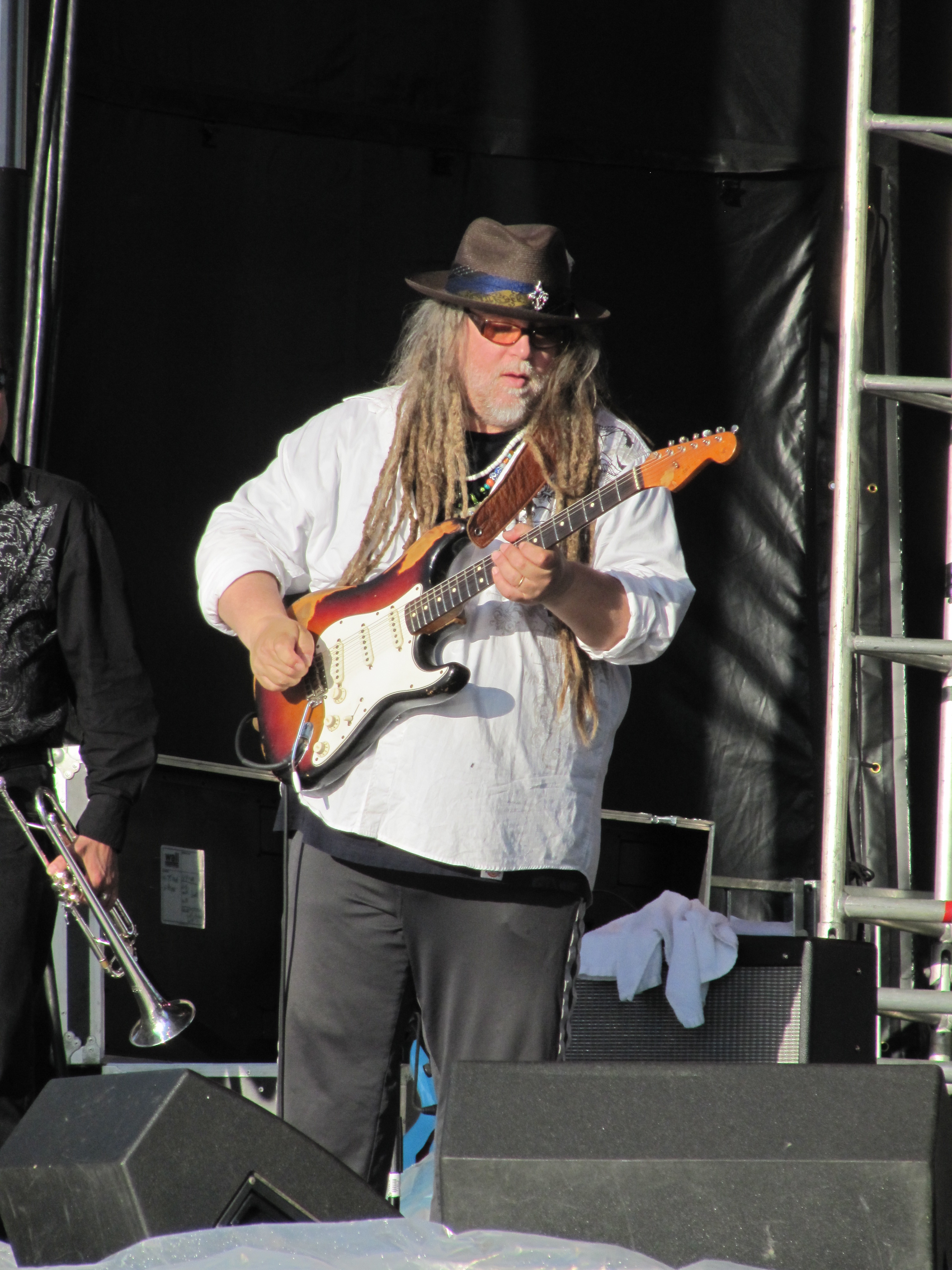
- Papa Mali

Background information
- Birth name: Malcolm Welbourne
- Born: May 6, 1957 (age 68); Vicksburg, Mississippi, United States
- Origin: Shreveport, Louisiana, United States
- Genres: Funk, blues, swamp, soul, reggae
- Occupation(s): Record producer, singer, guitarist, songwriter
- Instrument(s): Guitar, vocals
- Years active: 1970s–present
- Labels: Fog City, 429 Records

Malcolm "Papa Mali" Welbourne (born May 6, 1957) is an American record producer, guitarist, singer, and songwriter who grew up in Shreveport, Louisiana, United States, and lives in New Orleans, Louisiana, United States.

His debut recording Thunder Chicken, produced by Dan Prothero, has been referred to as "one of the few truly wild and unruly records to come from the rock & roll tradition in the 21st century".

== Biography ==
While still in grade school, he was conning his cousin to take him into the French Quarter so he could buy every element of Brian Jones's outfit from the front cover of The Rolling Stones High Tides & Green Grass.

He had taken up the guitar at age four, and was learning to play rock and blues by the time he was eleven. At the age of twelve he witnessed The Meters performing on the back of a flatbed truck in New Orleans on Mardi Gras Day. This would influence the young musician. John Campbell took him under his wing when Welbourne was 14, and around that time he started taking the blues seriously. By the time he was 17, he had left home and was hitch hiking around the south, playing guitar on the streets for passing change, playing in juke joints, forming short-lived bands or backing up blues and soul singers.

A trip to Jamaica in 1977 exposed him to reggae music, and a few years later he teamed up with Michael E. Johnson and Stanton Hoffman, and formed The Killer Bees in 1980. They continued to play for many years, eventually becoming one of the first American bands to perform at Reggae Sunsplash in Montego Bay, Jamaica in 1988. Earlier, while on tour with Burning Spear aka Winston Rodney and his band, he received the nickname, Papa Mali from the reggae pioneers. By the time the Killer Bees disbanded, Papa Mali went solo.

Upon the release of his debut album Thunder Chicken he remarked that for the first time in his adult life, he was finally able to reflect warmly on the years growing up in Shreveport. In 2007, he released the follow-up, Do Your Thing, also on the Fog City imprint and produced by Dan Prothero. The album included work by Big Chief Monk Boudreaux and the Golden Eagles Mardi Gras Indians, Kirk Joseph, and Henry Butler. By now, Papa Mali was performing at many of the top festivals in the U.S. and abroad.

On New Year's Eve of 2008/2009 Papa Mali, Matt Hubbard and former Neville Brothers bassist James "Hutch" Hutchinson performed with Grateful Dead drummer Bill Kreutzmann in concert at the Pauela Cannery in Haiku-Pauwela, Hawaii.

In 2009 he formed a new band, 7 Walkers along with Grateful Dead drummer Bill Kreutzmann, The Meters bassist George Porter Jr. (initially with bassist Reed Mathis) and multi-instrumentalist, Matt Hubbard. Their self-titled debut was released on November 2, 2010 on Response Records. The songs were co-written by Papa Mali and Robert Hunter. One of these songs, "King Cotton Blues", featured a duet by Papa Mali and Willie Nelson. The record was recorded in Austin, and produced by Papa Mali.

Papa Mali's latest album is Music is Love, released in 2015 is produced by John Chelew on the 429 Records label. Music is Love featured drummer Johnny Vidacovich, bassist Casandra Faulconer and also featured Mike Dillon and Dave Easley on backing vocals.

Papa Mali performed at South by Southwest in 2015.

== Selected discography ==
- The Killer Bees, Scratch The Surface (1985) – Beehive Records
- The Killer Bees, Groovin' (1987) – Jungle Records
- Michael E. Johnson and The Killer Bees, Live in Berlin (1988) – Rykodisc
- The Killer Bees, All Abuzz (1997) – Mozelle
- Papa Mali and the Instigators, Thunder Chicken (2000) – Fog City Records
- Imperial Golden Crown Harmonizers, Imperial Golden Crown Harmonizers (2001) – Catamount
- Malcom Welbourne, slide guitar on Omar & the Howlers, Boogie Man (2004) – Ruf Records
- Papa Mali, Do Your Thing (2007) – Fog City Records
- Papa Mali, Music Is Love (2015) – 429 Records

== As producer ==
- Ruthie Foster, The Phenomenal Ruthie Foster (2007) – Blue Corn
- The Greyhounds, Liberty (2005) – Luther
- Lavelle White, Into the Mystic (2004) – Antone’s
- Omar & the Howlers, Big Delta (2002) – Blind Pig
- Omar & the Howlers, The Screaming Cat (2000) – Provogue

== With 7 Walkers ==
- 7 Walkers, (2010) – Response Records
