= The Way (Fastball song) =

1998 single by Fastball

Single by Fastball

from the album All the Pain Money Can Buy
- B-side: "Are You Ready for the Fallout?"; "Freeloader Freddy"
- Written: 1997
- Released: January 7, 1998
- Studio: A&M (Los Angeles)
- Genre: Alternative rock; pop
- Length: 4:17 (album version); 4:08 (radio edit)
- Label: Hollywood
- Songwriter: Tony Scalzo
- Producers: Julian Raymond; Fastball

Fastball singles chronology
| "Are You Ready for the Fallout?" (1997) | "The Way" (1998) | "Fire Escape" (1998) |

Music videos
- "The Way" on YouTube

"The Way" is a song by American alternative rock band Fastball. It was released on January 7, 1998, as the lead single from their second studio album, All the Pain Money Can Buy (1998). The song was written by the band's lead vocalist, Tony Scalzo, and was produced by the band and Julian Raymond. Scalzo was inspired to write the song after reading about the disappearance of an elderly couple who were found dead in their car many miles away from their intended destination.

"The Way" peaked at number one on the US Billboard Modern Rock Tracks chart in April 1998 and remained there for seven weeks. It also reached number one in Canada on the week of June 15, 1998, and topped the RPM Alternative 30 chart for four weeks. Worldwide, the song peaked at number seven in Sweden and entered the top 20 in Australia, Iceland, and Norway. The song was voted by VH1 as one of its "100 Greatest Songs of the '90s", ranking it at number 94.

== Background and writing ==
Fastball frontman Tony Scalzo came up with the idea for the song after reading articles that described the June 1997 disappearance of an elderly married couple, Lela and Raymond Howard from Salado, Texas, who left home to attend the Pioneer Day festival at nearby Temple, Texas, despite Lela's Alzheimer's disease and Raymond recently recovering from brain surgery. They were discovered two weeks later, dead, at the bottom of a ravine near Hot Springs, Arkansas, hundreds of miles off their intended route. The authorities who investigated the incident believed that Lela, who was driving the car, was trying to locate a place where she had once vacationed.

== Content ==
The song's lyrics revolve around a couple who decide to leave their lives behind by going out driving, without telling their children about their plans. Their car breaks down during the trip, and they continue on foot. The chorus expresses the idea that the couple are achieving happiness by losing touch with the world, even though they may never see their home again. Singer Tony Scalzo explained the meaning by saying: "These people are gone, and their kids are all adults. It’s their lives; they’re probably just trying to get back that flavor of young love and adventure: 'Let’s go! We don’t have to tell anybody where we’re going; what business is that of theirs?'"

The beginning of the song features a few seconds of a radio scanning through FM stations. Most of the content heard is advertisements, but a brief fragment of the song "Foolish Games" by Jewel is audible.

== Track listings ==
UK 7-inch and cassette single; European CD single

1. "The Way" (radio edit) – 4:08
2. "Are You Ready for the Fallout?" – 3:15

UK, Australian, and Japanese CD single

1. "The Way" (radio edit) – 4:08
2. "Are You Ready for the Fallout?" – 3:15
3. "Freeloader Freddy" – 3:09

== Charts ==
=== Weekly charts ===
| Chart (1998) | Peak position |
|---|---|
| Australia (ARIA) | 14 |
| Canada Top Singles (RPM) | 1 |
| Canada Adult Contemporary (RPM) | 8 |
| Canada Rock/Alternative (RPM) | 1 |
| Europe (Eurochart Hot 100) | 42 |
| Germany (GfK) | 66 |
| Iceland (Íslenski Listinn Topp 40) | 16 |
| Italy Airplay (Music & Media) | 8 |
| Netherlands (Dutch Top 40 Tipparade) | 18 |
| Netherlands (Single Top 100) | 90 |
| Norway (VG-lista) | 15 |
| Scottish Singles Sales (Official Charts) | 23 |
| Sweden (Sverigetopplistan) | 7 |
| Switzerland (Schweizer Hitparade) | 36 |
| UK Singles (Official Charts) | 21 |
| US Radio Songs (Billboard) | 5 |
| US Adult Alternative Airplay (Billboard) | 1 |
| US Adult Pop Airplay (Billboard) | 2 |
| US Alternative Airplay (Billboard) | 1 |
| US Mainstream Rock Airplay (Billboard) | 25 |
| US Pop Airplay (Billboard) | 4 |

=== Year-end charts ===
| Chart (1998) | Position |
|---|---|
| Australia (ARIA) | 48 |
| Canada Top Singles (RPM) | 4 |
| Canada Adult Contemporary (RPM) | 51 |
| Canada Rock/Alternative (RPM) | 3 |
| Sweden (Hitlistan) | 48 |
| US Hot 100 Airplay (Billboard) | 12 |
| US Adult Top 40 (Billboard) | 4 |
| US Mainstream Rock Tracks (Billboard) | 78 |
| US Mainstream Top 40 (Billboard) | 16 |
| US Modern Rock Tracks (Billboard) | 8 |
| US Triple-A (Billboard) | 4 |

| Chart (1999) | Position |
|---|---|
| US Adult Top 40 (Billboard) | 100 |

== Certifications ==
| Region | Certification | Certified units/sales |
|---|---|---|
| Australia (ARIA) | Gold | 35,000^{^} |
| Sweden (GLF) | Gold | 15,000^{^} |
| United States (RIAA) | Gold | 500,000^{‡} |
^{^} Shipments figures based on certification alone.^{‡} Sales+streaming figures based on certification alone.

== Release history ==
| Region | Date | Format(s) | Label(s) | Ref. |
|---|---|---|---|---|
| United States | January 7, 1998 | Modern rock; triple A radio | Hollywood | |
| United States | February 24, 1998 | Mainstream rock radio | Hollywood | |
| United Kingdom | September 21, 1998 | CD; cassette | Hollywood | |
| Japan | September 30, 1998 | CD | Hollywood | |
| United States | October 28, 2003 | Digital download | Hollywood | |

== Covers ==
In 2019, alt-country band Silverada (then known as Mike and the Moonpies) recorded a cover of the song while playing a show to mark the 45th anniversary of the Hole in the Wall bar that gave both Mike and the Moonpies and Fastball their start.

== Uses in media ==
In 2026, "The Way" was featured in the fifth episode of the third season of the Hulu drama series Tell Me Lies, playing during a scene in which a character confesses she is secretly planning to drive and visit her estranged mother.
