= Fastball (band) =

American rock band

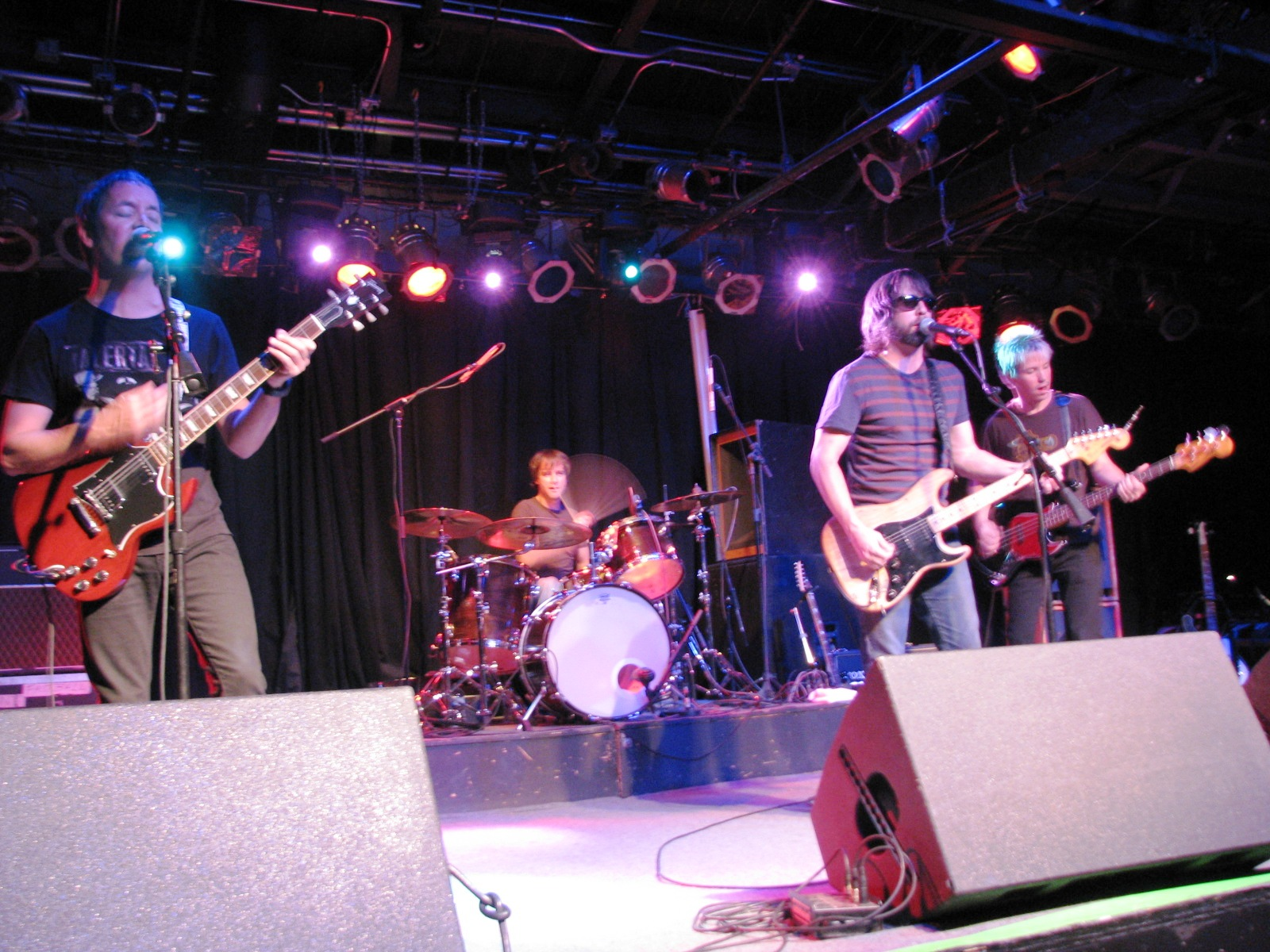
- Fastball performing in 2008

Background information
- Origin: Austin, Texas, United States
- Genres: Alternative rock; pop rock; power pop
- Years active: 1992–present
- Labels: Megaforce; Jupiter; Rykodisc; Hollywood; 33 and 1/3 Records
- Members: Tony Scalzo; Miles Zuniga; Joey Shuffield
- Website: www.fastballtheband.com

Fastball is an American rock band formed in Austin, Texas, in 1992. The band originally called themselves Magneto U.S.A., and changed their name after signing with Hollywood Records. In 1998, their album All the Pain Money Can Buy reached platinum sales within six months of its release, and stayed on the Billboard 200 chart for a year. Their songs "The Way" and "Out of My Head" reached No. 1 and No. 14 on Billboards Adult Alternative Songs chart, respectively. In addition, the group has been nominated for two Grammy Awards – Best Rock Performance by a Duo or Group with Vocal for "The Way", and Best Long Form Music Video for their promotional video "The Way". They also received five The Austin Chronicle awards: 1998's Album of the Year, Best Video, Best Single/EP, Band of the Year, and 1995's Best Pop Band.

In late 2021, Fastball started a Patreon campaign supporting the release of new music, as well as demos of their songs and the stories behind them.

== History ==
=== Formation (1992–1995) ===
Fastball was formed in Austin, Texas, in 1992 by songwriters Tony Scalzo and Miles Zuniga, alongside drummer Joey Shuffield. Prior to the band's inception, Zuniga and Shuffield had performed together in the Austin-based group Big Car. Shuffield, who also had a tenure with the Wild Seeds, introduced Zuniga to Scalzo, a recent transplant from Orange County, California, who had previously played with The Goods.

The trio began performing regularly in the Austin club circuit, initially under a variety of temporary names, including Magneto, Magneto USA, and Starchy. During this formative period, the band established a collaborative songwriting dynamic between Scalzo and Zuniga, a hallmark of their subsequent studio output.

In 1995, the group officially adopted the name Fastball and secured a recording contract with Hollywood Records. This partnership led to the commencement of recording sessions for their debut studio album, Make Your Mama Proud, which was released the following year.

=== 1996–1997: Make Your Mama Proud ===
Following their formation, Fastball established a presence in the Austin music scene, performing frequently at local venues like The Hole in the Wall. Their live performances caught the attention of local journalist and musician Kevin Connor, who recommended the band to Hollywood Records. After a showcase for label executives, the trio signed a recording contract and began work on their debut studio album.

Released on April 6, 1996, Make Your Mama Proud was produced by Jerry Finn, who had recently gained prominence for his work on Green Day's Dookie. The album featured a high-energy, guitar-driven sound that emphasized the dual-songwriting and vocal contributions of Tony Scalzo and Miles Zuniga. The band released a single, "Are You Ready for the Fallout?", to promote the record.

While the album did not achieve immediate national commercial success, it solidified the band's reputation in Texas. In 1996, Fastball won "Best Pop Band" at the Austin Music Awards. Despite the award and favorable critical reviews, the band faced pressure to deliver a commercial breakthrough. This period of transition saw the group touring extensively and demoing new material, which would eventually form the basis for their 1998 multi-platinum follow-up, All the Pain Money Can Buy.

=== 1998-1999: All the Pain Money Can Buy ===
The members of Fastball still had side jobs as late as January 1998. Tony Scalzo worked the graveyard shift at The Bagel Manufactory in Austin. He, Shuffield, and Zuniga would be on The Tonight Show with Jay Leno and Late Night with Conan O'Brien just four months later. Fastball's second album, All the Pain Money Can Buy, was released on Hollywood Records. Within just six months, it had sold more than a million copies.

The single "The Way" stayed on top of Billboard's Modern Rock Tracks chart for seven weeks, and was a top-five hit on Billboard's Top 40 Mainstream chart. Scalzo was inspired to write the song in 1997 after reading a news article about Lela and Raymond Howard, an elderly couple who had disappeared in Texas. Though Lela had Alzheimer's and Raymond was recovering from brain surgery, the couple had been driving to a local festival. They were discovered two weeks later, dead, at the bottom of a ravine near Hot Springs, Arkansas, hundreds of miles off their intended route. Scalzo chose to imagine that they began reminiscing and decided to become ethereal beings on a permanent romantic trip, the answer to the song's question, "Where were they going without ever knowing the way?"

Fastball followed up "The Way" with a second single, "Fire Escape", and a third single, "Out of My Head", which reached the top ten on Billboard's Top 40 chart and was a top ten hit on the Adult Top 40 chart for 29 weeks. The album's promotional tour featured Marcy Playground and Everclear, after which Fastball moved to the H.O.R.D.E. tour.

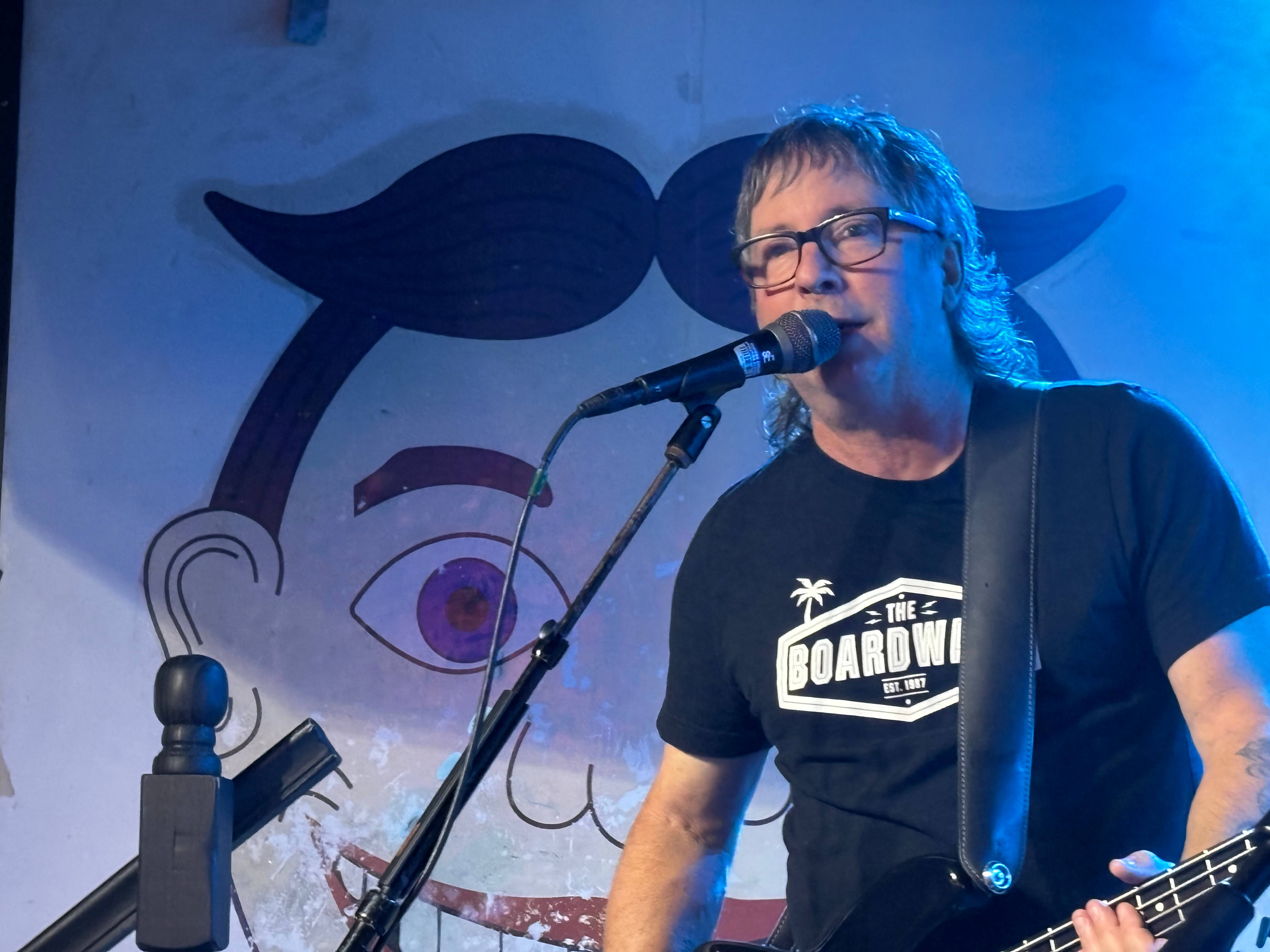
Tony Scalzo performs with Fastball at the Wonder Bar in Asbury Park, NJ on April 24, 2024.

In 1999, Fastball received two Grammy Award nominations as a result of All the Pain Money Can Buy. One was for Best Rock Performance by a Duo or Group with Vocals, and the other was Best Long Form Video for "The Way". They also received an MTV Award nomination for Best New Artist.

=== 2000: The Harsh Light of Day ===
The group headed back into the studio to record their third album, The Harsh Light of Day. Produced by Julian Raymond and Fastball, the album was released in September 2000.

The release included "You're an Ocean", which featured the piano stylings of Billy Preston (who previously collaborated with The Beatles). Singer-guitarist Brian Setzer also contributed to the album with Latin guitar on "Love Is Expensive and Free." "Instead of tailoring the music for short attention spans, we tried to make an album that holds up well to extensive listening... kind of cinematic, where you notice new themes entering the frame each time you see the film," Zuniga said in the band's record company bio.

Although The Harsh Light of Day sold fewer than 85,000 copies (compared to All The Pain Money Can Buy's 1,000,000+), the trio didn't lose steam and chalked it up to lacking a musical category to fit into. "You can't write down what we do in a sentence" Zuniga told Mac Randall at Launch.com. "Marketing us is a problem. But in a way, that's our saving grace also, because you can't find an easy angle to summarize us and exploit us. We might sell more records if you could, but at the same time, it forces people that really want to be interested in us to pay a little more attention to what we're doing."

In October 2000, Fastball began touring in support of The Harsh Light of Day in Amsterdam. Despite the slowed success, the members of the group didn't regret any of their creative decisions, and their aim remained true. "It makes me feel proud that we're one of these song-oriented guitar bands" Scalzo told Richard Skanse in Rolling Stone. "I think there's a couple of bands that are still putting out real good quality guitar rock songs, and I think we're one of them."

=== 2004–2007: Keep Your Wig On and Independent Transition ===
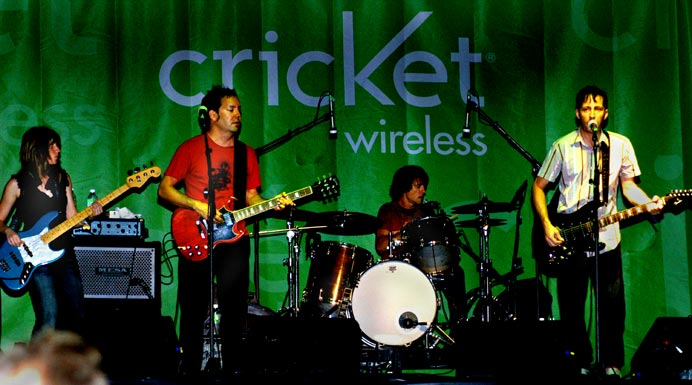
Fastball live at Waterloo Park in Austin, Texas, August 6, 2006. From left to right: Harmoni Kelley (support musician), Miles Zuniga, Joey Shuffield, and Tony Scalzo.

Following a four-year hiatus from studio recording, Fastball signed with the independent label Rykodisc in early 2004. On June 8, 2004, the band released their fourth studio album, Keep Your Wig On. While the majority of the sessions were produced by Mike McCarthy, the band collaborated with Adam Schlesinger (of Fountains of Wayne), who produced the tracks "Red Light" and "Someday." The album was mixed by the renowned engineer Bob Clearmountain, ensuring a high-fidelity, polished power-pop sound that contrasted with the moodier tone of their previous effort, The Harsh Light of Day.

To translate the album's layered arrangements to a live setting, the trio expanded their touring lineup for the first time. Jeff Groves initially took over bass duties, allowing Tony Scalzo and Miles Zuniga to focus on intricate guitar and keyboard parts. By 2006, the touring roster transitioned to include bassist Harmoni Kelley, who supported the band during high-profile appearances, including their August 2006 performance at Waterloo Park in Austin. In 2007, "The Way" was voted No. 94 on VH1's television special, The 100 Greatest Songs of the 90's.

=== 2009-2013: Little White Lies and solo projects ===
On April 14, 2009, Fastball released its fifth album, Little White Lies. The album was co-produced by Zuniga and experienced producer CJ Eiriksson, with mixing by Bob Clearmountain.

Scalzo and Zuniga would work on separate solo projects in the following years, with Zuniga's solo album, These Ghosts Have Bones, being released in September 2011 and Scalzo releasing My Favorite Year in February 2013. Both were successfully funded with the help of their respective Kickstarter campaigns.

Spring 2013 saw the arrival of "Love Comes in Waves," a fresh digital single that later got the visual treatment from director Tyler Esposito in July. The video didn't just highlight the song—it helped fuel the hype for their summer trek with Sugar Ray on the "Under The Sun" tour.

=== 2015-2017: "Bad Things" and Step Into Light ===
On February 5, 2015, the band began recording a new album at The Bubble recording studio in Austin.

In late 2016, Fastball experienced a significant resurgence in mainstream visibility when American rapper Machine Gun Kelly and singer Camila Cabello released the single "Bad Things." The track heavily interpolates the chorus and melody of Fastball’s 1999 hit "Out of My Head," written by Tony Scalzo. "Bad Things" became a massive commercial success, peaking at number four on the Billboard Hot 100 and earning a 5× Platinum certification from the RIAA. This interpolation introduced the band’s songwriting to a new generation of listeners and provided a renewed platform for their return to the studio.

Capitalizing on this momentum, the band announced their sixth studio album, Step Into Light, in March 2017. The album, their first since 2009's Little White Lies, was released on May 19, 2017, through 33 1/3 Records. To promote the record, the band released several music videos directed by the legendary Nigel Dick, including "I Will Never Let You Down."

In mid-September 2017, the band played a living room concert at the home of Los Angeles–based comic Chet Wild following a nearly year-long Twitter campaign (#FastballAtChets). The concert raised $12,500 via Indiegogo to assist with Hurricane Harvey relief efforts. Several attendees at the concert took part in the filming of the video for "Best Friend" earlier that day, once again directed by Nigel Dick.

=== 2018-2019: The Help Machine ===
Following the success of their 2017 comeback, Fastball began work on their seventh studio album, The Help Machine. Released on October 18, 2019, through 33 1/3 Records, the album was produced by Steve Berlin of Los Lobos. Berlin’s involvement marked a shift in the band's recording process; he personally selected the 11 tracks from a pool of demos provided by songwriters Tony Scalzo and Miles Zuniga to create a more cohesive, "modern" sonic palette.

Berlin recruited bassist Bruce Hughes (formerly of Poi Dog Pondering) to handle most of the bass duties, which allowed Scalzo to focus on keyboards and more intricate guitar work. Critics described the record as "ethereal" and "sonically offbeat," with PopMatters referring to it as "pop perfection" and comparing its depth to the work of Elvis Costello and the Beatles.

=== 2021–2023: Independent Production and The Deep End ===
In late 2021, Fastball transitioned to a direct-to-fan subscription model by launching a Patreon platform. This initiative was designed to fund the recording of new material while providing supporters with exclusive access to high-quality demos, track-by-track commentaries, and archival live recordings. The move marked a significant shift in the band's career, allowing for total creative and financial autonomy outside of the traditional record label system.

The first major output of this era was the digital EP Soundtrack, released on March 18, 2022. The EP served as a precursor to the band's eighth studio album, The Deep End, which was released digitally on June 17, 2022, via 33 1/3 Records.

The Deep End saw the band reunite with producer Steve Berlin (of Los Lobos), who had previously helmed their 2019 release, The Help Machine. Recorded primarily at The 12th Street Sound in Austin, Texas, the album showcased a collaborative production effort; while Berlin produced the majority of the tracks, the band self-produced the songs "I Only Remember the Good," "Andrea," and "Infatuation." The album's physical release followed later that year, featuring cover art designed by Miles Zuniga.

=== 2024-Present: Sonic Ranch ===
On June 21, 2024, Fastball released their ninth studio album, Sonic Ranch. The album's title and sonic identity were inspired by the band’s time recording at the legendary Sonic Ranch residential complex in Tornillo, Texas. This setting allowed the trio to record in a communal environment, resulting in a more cohesive and "live" studio sound.

While David Garza (known for his work with Fiona Apple) produced the core sessions, veteran pop producer John Fields (noted for his work with Demi Lovato and Jimmy Eat World) provided additional production and mixing.

The album's promotional cycle was anchored by the lead single, "Rather Be Me Than You." The track was accompanied by a stylized music video that was heavily promoted across digital platforms to signal the band’s return.

In addition to "Rather Be Me Than You," the album featured the singles "Daydream" and "Americana," further solidifying the record's themes of nostalgia and modern resilience. Critics praised Sonic Ranch as a career-best effort, noting that the band had successfully integrated their '90s power-pop roots with a sophisticated, contemporary Americana influence.

== Members ==
Current members

- Tony Scalzo – vocals, bass guitar, keyboards, guitar (1995–present)
- Joey Shuffield – drums, percussion (1995–present)
- Miles Zuniga – vocals, guitar (1995–present)

Current touring personnel

- Bobby Daniel – bass guitar, keyboards, vocals

Former touring personnel

- Mike Evans - guitar, keys, vocals (1998-1999)
- Jeff Groves – bass (2004-2005)
- Harmoni Kelley – bass, vocals (2006–2008)
- John Clayton – bass, vocals (2008)
- Cory Glaeser – bass, vocals (2009–2011)
- Bruce Hughes – bass, vocals (2008, 2010)
- Michael Klooster – keyboards (2013)
- Robin Wilson – vocals, percussion (2013)
- Lonnie Trevino Jr. – bass, vocals
- Kevin McKinney – guitar

== Discography ==
Studio albums

- Make Your Mama Proud (1996)
- All the Pain Money Can Buy (1998)
- The Harsh Light of Day (2000)
- Keep Your Wig On (2004)
- Little White Lies (2009)
- Step Into Light (2017)
- The Help Machine (2019)
- The Deep End (2022)
- Sonic Ranch (2024)

EPs

- Soundtrack (2022)

== See also ==
- Music of Austin
