= Hollywood Records =

American record label

Hollywood Records, Inc.
- Logo used since 2002
- Parent company: Disney Music Group
- Founded: December 1989; 36 years ago
- Distributor: Universal Music (primary distributor)
- Genre: Various
- Country of origin: United States
- Location: Walt Disney Studios, Burbank, California
- Official website: hollywoodrecords.com

Hollywood Records is an American record label owned by the Disney Music Group which focuses on pop, rock, alternative, hip-hop and country genres, also specializing in recordings for a more mature audience not suitable for the flagship Walt Disney Records label.

Founded in December 1989, its current roster includes Sofia Carson, Tini, Area21, Queen, Little Image, Almost Monday, Joywave, Andy Grammer, Adrian Lyles, Freya Skye and Hudson Stone. The label also releases soundtrack albums and digital releases from Marvel Studios, 20th Century Studios, Searchlight Pictures, ABC, National Geographic, Hulu, 20th Television, Freeform, FX Productions, and ESPN since their acquisitions by The Walt Disney Company.

== History ==
=== 1989–1995: Founding and early years ===
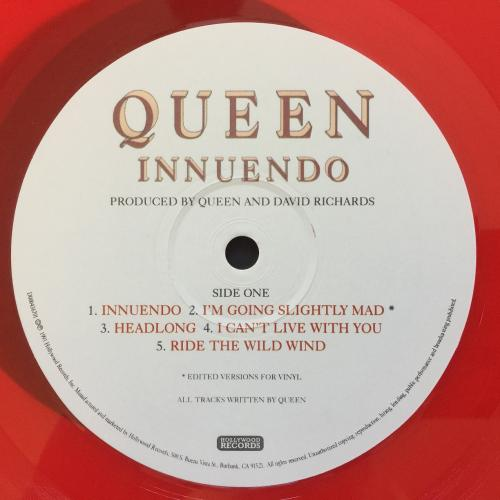
Queen's 1991 album Innuendo was their first to be released through Hollywood Records.

Hollywood Records was formed in December 1989 by Michael Eisner, then-CEO of The Walt Disney Company, as a way of expanding the company's music operations by looking to develop and promote the careers of a wide variety of artists in various genres. At the time, the company was limited to the release of soundtracks from Touchstone, and Hollywood Pictures films. (Note: Buena Vista Records is currently limited to the release of soundtracks from Touchstone and Hollywood Pictures films.) The first act to be signed to the label was The Party, after being formed from Mouseketeers on The Mickey Mouse Club. Lawyer Peter Paterno was the first president of the label, until his resignation in 1993 because of the division's lackluster sales. After failing to sign popular new artists such as Nirvana, The Smashing Pumpkins, Naughty by Nature, Cypress Hill and Dr. Dre, the label experienced its first major success in February 1990, when it acquired the North American distribution rights to Queen's entire catalog for $10 million. The following year, the first Queen album under Hollywood, Innuendo, was released. The deal's outlook as an important economic opportunity was immediately affected by the death of the band's lead singer Freddie Mercury, although the band's catalog sales managed to successfully generate nearly $94 million in revenue for Disney from 1991 to 1995.

=== 1995–1998: Financial struggles and restructuring ===
Bob Pfeifer was named president of the label in March 1995 after a whole year without a president, but problems continued to the label and Pfeifer was fired in 1997, after the label revealed that he had lost over 150 million dollars since 1990. In 1997, Disney acquired Mammoth Records, in order to get an already-established record label that could succeed. However, the acquisition of Mammoth was a failure and the label was closed and integrated to Hollywood in 2003. Additionally, during this time, they had signed Duran Duran to a three-album contract, and subsequently released Pop Trash, only to terminate their contract after disappointing album sales. In 1998, the company decided to form Buena Vista Music Group (now Disney Music Group), integrating the operations of Walt Disney Records along with Hollywood, Lyric Street, Mammoth, and Disney Music Publishing. Bob Cavallo, former manager of Earth, Wind & Fire and Prince was appointed as chairman of the group, and president of Hollywood Records. This movement looked to organize the music operations of the company under a more integrated direction.

=== 1998–2012: Return to success ===
In 1998, Hollywood Records had its first major success in seven years with Fastball's second album, All the Pain Money Can Buy, whose accompanying hit single "The Way" helped the label return to mainstream prominence. Five years later, Hilary Duff's second studio album Metamorphosis was released and became a success to the label, selling over three million copies in the United States. The launch of Duff's career represented a new business model for the record, utilizing the synergies around the company, including important outlets like Disney Channel, Radio Disney, ABC Family and ABC. Duff's albums released under Hollywood proved to be equally successful including Duff's self-titled third album and 2005's Most Wanted. Duff's success led to Hollywood utilizing talent from Disney Channel (such as Miley Cyrus, Demi Lovato, Selena Gomez, the Jonas Brothers and Bridgit Mendler) as artists into the mid-2010s, with several records that attained Platinum or Gold certifications. These artists' music careers proved the label to be successful. At the same time, the label continued to develop the careers of acts with a less mainstream profile such as Grace Potter & the Nocturnals, Breaking Benjamin or Plain White T's, but who had been successful in its own terms. The label also continued to release soundtracks from films and television shows, mainly those derived from Marvel Studios productions in conjunction with Marvel Music. In 2010, Hollywood absorbed the remaining operations of country music label Lyric Street Records, which became an imprint for the catalog of the defunct-label, currently managed by Hollywood. Later that same year, Queen left EMI Records for Universal Music-owned Island Records, with Hollywood continuing to remain the group's North American music distributor.

=== 2012–present: Hollywood under Ken Bunt ===
In January 2012, after 14 years of a successful tenure, Bob Cavallo retired as chairman of the group and Ken Bunt was appointed as president of the group. Several changes have been done under his tenure, including the retirement of long-time executives from the Cavallo's era like Abbey Konowitch, Justin Fontaine and Jhon Linda and the appointment of new A&R's like Mio Vukovic and Mike Daly. In March 2013, Disney Music Group and Universal Music Group announced the expansion of their relationship with a new commercial and creative agreement that enable Hollywood Records' artists to collaborate with the roster of producers and songwriters that are part of Universal. Since 2013, Hollywood Records also uses the brand name DMG Nashville to specialize in country music. The genre label was founded to provide music licensing for Bigger Picture Music Group. After Bigger Picture's closure in 2014, DMG Nashville released its first studio album; Lucy Hale's Road Between. Starting in 2020, Hollywood Records has released a series of EPs under the name Music for the Movement, with social justice and protest songs.

On June 3, 2025, it was announced that the label Good Company Records had rebranded as Vanta Records and partnered with Disney Music Group, to sign and develop artists including Samara Cyn, India Shawn, and RÜDE CÅT.

== Hollywood BASIC ==
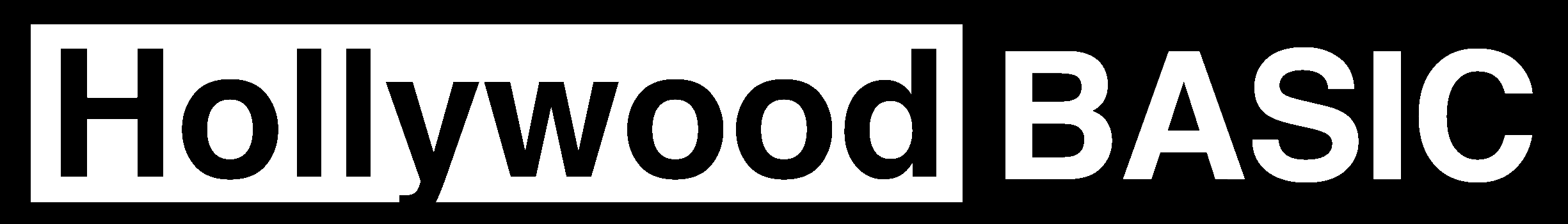
Hollywood Basic logo used from 1990 to 1995.

Hollywood BASIC [sic] was Hollywood's short-lived hip-hop subsidiary, run by Dave “Funken” Klein, which existed from 1990 to 1995. It did not survive the distribution transition its parent made to PolyGram Records, and all of its recordings were deleted, except for those by Organized Konfusion, which were re-pressed under the new deal. It was the first label to record DJ Shadow, releasing his "Lesson 4" (a reference to Double Dee and Steinski) as the B-side of a 1991 single by Lifers Group, a hip-hop group composed of prisoners at East Jersey State Prison in Rahway, New Jersey. It also released Shadow's Legitimate Mix on the B-side of a single by the group Zimbabwe Legit in 1992. Arguably the most high-profile release was due to be BASIC Queen Bootlegs, a 10-track collection of hip-hop remixes and reinterpretations of tracks by the rock band Queen and featuring roster names plus guests such as Ice Cube. Although the BASIC Beats Sampler confirmed its release date for April 1992, the album was not commercially released, although it has since leaked online. Other notable releases came from Organized Konfusion; its challenging second album, Stress: The Extinction Agenda (1994), was widely acclaimed. The label was also home of Charizma and Peanut Butter Wolf, although, following the shooting death of Charizma in 1993, the music the duo recorded for the label was not released. This would later inspire Peanut Butter Wolf to found Stones Throw Records in order to make this music available. Acts on Hollywood BASIC's roster included Charizma and Peanut Butter Wolf, Lifers' Group, Organized Konfusion, Raw Fusion, Hi-C, and Zimbabwe Legit.

== Distribution ==
Upon its 1989 launch, Hollywood was distributed in the United States and Canada by Elektra Records, at the time owned by Disney rival Time Warner. Distribution in North America switched to PolyGram (acquired by Universal Music Group) in 1995 (partnered with A&M in Canada until PolyGram's merger with the MCA family of labels in 1999). Today, Universal Music Group markets and distributes Hollywood Records catalog worldwide. Also, several Hollywood artists including Demi Lovato, Bridgit Mendler, Selena Gomez & the Scene, Nick Jonas & the Administration, Joe Jonas, Miley Cyrus, and the Jonas Brothers had signed to Universal Music UK's Fascination Records. There were reports in 2011 that Disney Music Group would start an independent US distribution arm for its label's releases, but this never enacted. Universal Music Group acquired most of EMI in 2013 but pledged not to renew its European license with Disney; both sides eventually changed their minds. In March 2013, Disney Music Group and Universal Music Group announced the expansion of their relationship with a new commercial and creative agreement that enabled Hollywood Records' artists to collaborate with the roster of producers and songwriters that are part of Universal Music.

== See also ==
- CDVU+
- Fox Music
- List of record labels
- Marvel Music
