= Tony Scalzo =

American rock musician and singer-songwriter (born 1964)

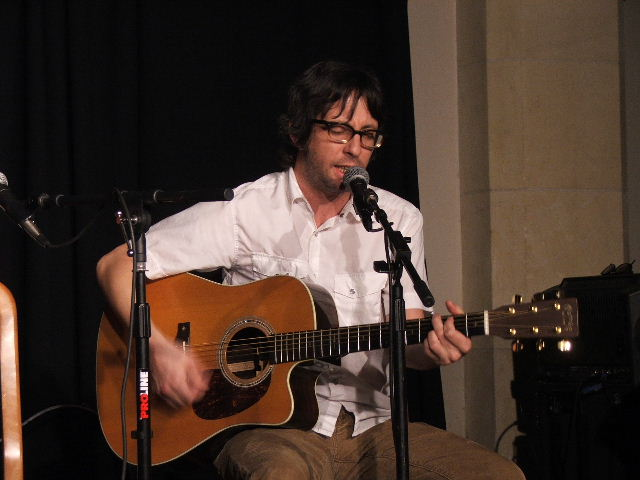
- Scalzo performing in Austin, Texas, 2006

Background information
- Born: Anthony Scalzo; May 6, 1964 (age 62); Honolulu, Hawaii, U.S.
- Origin: Austin, Texas, U.S.
- Genres: Pop rock; alternative rock
- Occupations: Musician; singer; songwriter
- Instruments: Vocals; bass; guitar; keyboards
- Years active: 1980s–present
- Member of: Fastball
- Formerly of: The Goods; Beaver Nelson Band

Anthony Scalzo (born May 6, 1964) is an American rock musician and songwriter best known as the lead singer of the band Fastball.

== Early and personal life ==
Scalzo was born in Hawaii to a mother from Arizona and an Italian-American father from New Jersey but moved quite often as a child because his father was a U.S. Marine. Scalzo learned to play guitar as a teen. He attended Tustin High School in Tustin, California. Scalzo began playing bass guitar in the 1980s and soon began forming bands. He has four children.

== Career ==
In 1992, Scalzo left his pop-punk group The Goods and made the decision to relocate to Austin, Texas to join the Beaver Nelson Band. However, he ended up leaving the group and helped form the band Fastball. The new group was composed of Scalzo and two of his former bandmates, Joey Shuffield and Miles Zuniga. Fastball was signed by Hollywood Records and began touring the country. Their second album had Top Ten hits in six countries in the middle of 1998, and the album soon went platinum. Scalzo describes his success as being "a big homegrown thing." Scalzo also wrote their hit song, "The Way".

In 2013, Scalzo released his first studio album, My Favorite Year. It was engineered by Joe Blaney, who helped to engineer The Clash's fifth album Combat Rock. Work on the album started on 2011, when Scalzo started a Kickstarter program. Some of the songs were co-written with his Fastball colleague Miles Zuniga and were intended to be Fastball tracks, but were not included in any of the band's records.

== Discography ==
=== Solo ===
- My Favorite Year (2013)

== Filmography ==
- Screw Cupid (2007) (completed) (writer: "Lonely Heart")
- Summer Catch (2001) (writer: "Every Time She Walks")
- Loser (2000) (writer: "Out Of My Head")
- "Charmed" Fastball (1 episode, 2000)

== See also ==
- Music of Austin
