= Perfil (Ana Carolina album) =

Compilation album by Ana Carolina
- Released: 2005
- Genre: MPB, alternative dance, pop, bossa nova, samba
- Length: 56:12
- Label: Sony BMG/Som Livre

Ana Carolina chronology
Estampado (2003)	Perfil (2005)	Ana & Jorge (2005)

Perfil (In English: "Profile") is a compilation album from Brazilian singer Ana Carolina, released in 2005 through Sony BMG and Som Livre.

The album has three songs from other albums have release of the singer (Ana Carolina, Ana Rita Joana Iracema e Carolina and Estampado).

== Track listing ==
No.	Title	Length
1.	"Garganta"	3:01
2.	"Tô Saindo"	3:07
3.	"Quem de Nós Dois" (La Mia Storia Tra le Dita)	5:07
4.	"Ela É Bamba"	3:06
5.	"Confesso"	3:33
6.	"Encostar Na Tua"	4:13
7.	"Uma Louca Tempestade"	4:33
8.	"Nua"	4:05
9.	"Pra Rua Me Levar"	3:52
10.	"Elevador" (Livro de Esquecimento)	3:15
11.	"Nada Pra Mim"	3:41
12.	"Que Se Danem Os Nós"	3:36
13.	"O Avesso dos Ponteiros"	3:49
14.	"Beatriz"	3:46
Total length:		56:12

== Charts ==
=== Year-end charts ===
Chart (2005)	Peak position
Brazilian Albums (Pro-Música Brasil)	1

Chart (2007)	Peak position
Brazilian Albums (Pro-Música Brasil)	4

== Certifications ==
Region	Certification	Certified units/sales
Brazil (Pro-Música Brasil)	Diamond	1,000,000^{*}
^{*} Sales figures based on certification alone.
