= 2006 Multishow Brazilian Music Awards =

13th edition of the Multishow Brazilian Music Awards held in 2006

- Date: 16 May 2006
- Location: Theatro Municipal; Rio de Janeiro, Rio de Janeiro, Brazil
- Hosted by: Fernanda Torres
- Website: gshow.globo.com/multishow/premio-multishow

Television/radio coverage
- Network: Multishow

The 2006 Multishow Brazilian Music Awards (Portuguese: Prêmio Multishow de Música Brasileira 2006) (or simply 2006 Multishow Awards) (Portuguese: Prêmio Multishow 2006) was held on 16 May 2006, at the Theatro Municipal in Rio de Janeiro, Brazil. Actress Fernanda Torres hosted the ceremony.

== Winners and nominees ==
Nominees for each award are listed below; winners are listed first and highlighted in boldface.

Best Male Singer	Best Female Singer
**Dinho Ouro Preto**; Lulu Santos; Marcelo D2; Seu Jorge; Zeca Pagodinho	**Ana Carolina**; Ivete Sangalo; Marisa Monte; Pitty; Vanessa da Mata
New Artist	Best Group
**Marjorie Estiano**; Cachorro Grande; Forfun; Leela; Luxúria	**Jota Quest**; Capital Inicial; CPM 22; Los Hermanos; O Rappa
Best Instrumentalist	Best CD
**Rodrigo Amarante (Los Hermanos)**; Frejat (Barão Vermelho); Japinha (CPM 22); Marco Túlio (Jota Quest); Yves Passarell (Capital Inicial)	**Ana & Jorge – Ana Carolina and Seu Jorge**; Imunidade Musical – Charlie Brown Jr.; 4 – Los Hermanos; Infinito Particular – Marisa Monte; Anacrônico – Pitty
Best DVD	Best Song
**Acústico MTV – O Rappa**; Ana & Jorge – Ana Carolina and Seu Jorge; MTV Especial: Aborto Elétrico – Capital Inicial; Perfil – Chico Buarque; Renato Russo - Uma Celebração – Legião Urbana	**"Ai, Ai, Ai..." – Vanessa da Mata**; "É Isso Aí" – Ana Carolina and Seu Jorge; "Irreversível" – CPM 22; "O Sol" – Jota Quest; "O Vento" – Los Hermanos
Best Music Video	Best Show
**"Memórias" – Pitty**; "Bola de Sabão" – Babado Novo; "1997" – Hateen; "Cotidiano de um Casal Feliz" – Jay Vaquer; "Na Pista" – Os Paralamas do Sucesso	**Ivete Sangalo**; Capital Inicial; Charlie Brown Jr.; Jota Quest; Los Hermanos
