= List of number-one albums of 2009 (Brazil) =

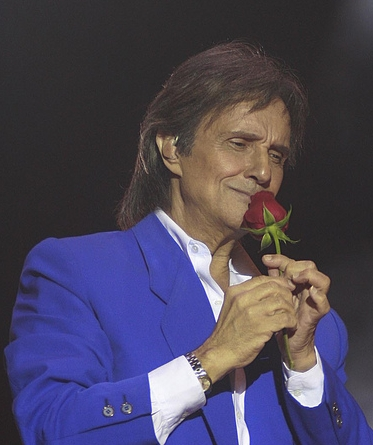
Roberto Carlos' compilation album Elas Cantam Roberto Carlos was the album that spent more weeks in the chart, remaining on the top for seven weeks.

The highest-selling albums in Brazil are ranked in the CD - TOP 20 Semanal ABPD, published by the Associação Brasileira dos Produtores de Discos (ABPD). The data are compiled by Nielsen based on each album's physical sales and published weekly since June 2009 by ABPD.^{a} In 2009, eleven albums reached the peak of the chart.

Música popular brasileira singer Roberto Carlos' Elas Cantam Roberto Carlos had the longest run among the releases that have reached peak position. The album remained at the top of the charts from its issue date of September 7 to October 19. Other artists who had extended runs on the chart include Michael Jackson—the only international artist that reached the top of the chart in 2009—, Ana Carolina, and Victor & Leo. Padre Fábio de Melo, Raça Negra, and two soundtrack albums also reached the peak position—Rede Globo telenovelas Paraiso and Caminho das Índias' soundtracks.

== Chart history ==
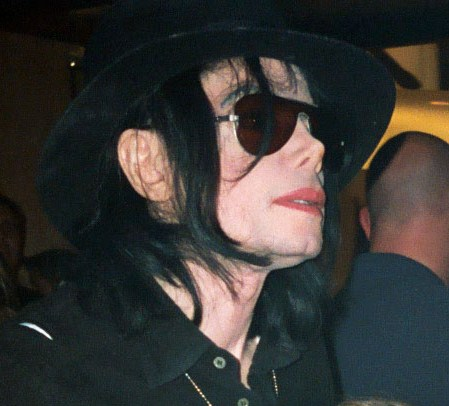
Michael Jackson was the only international singer to reach the top of the chart.

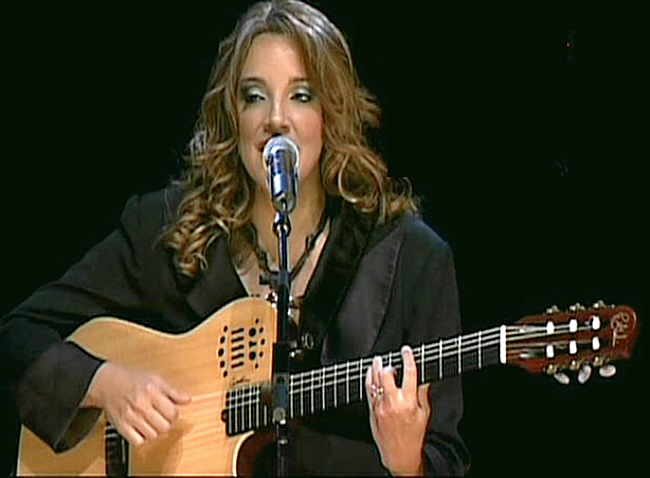
Ana Carolina spent three weeks at the top of the Top 20 with her album N9ve.

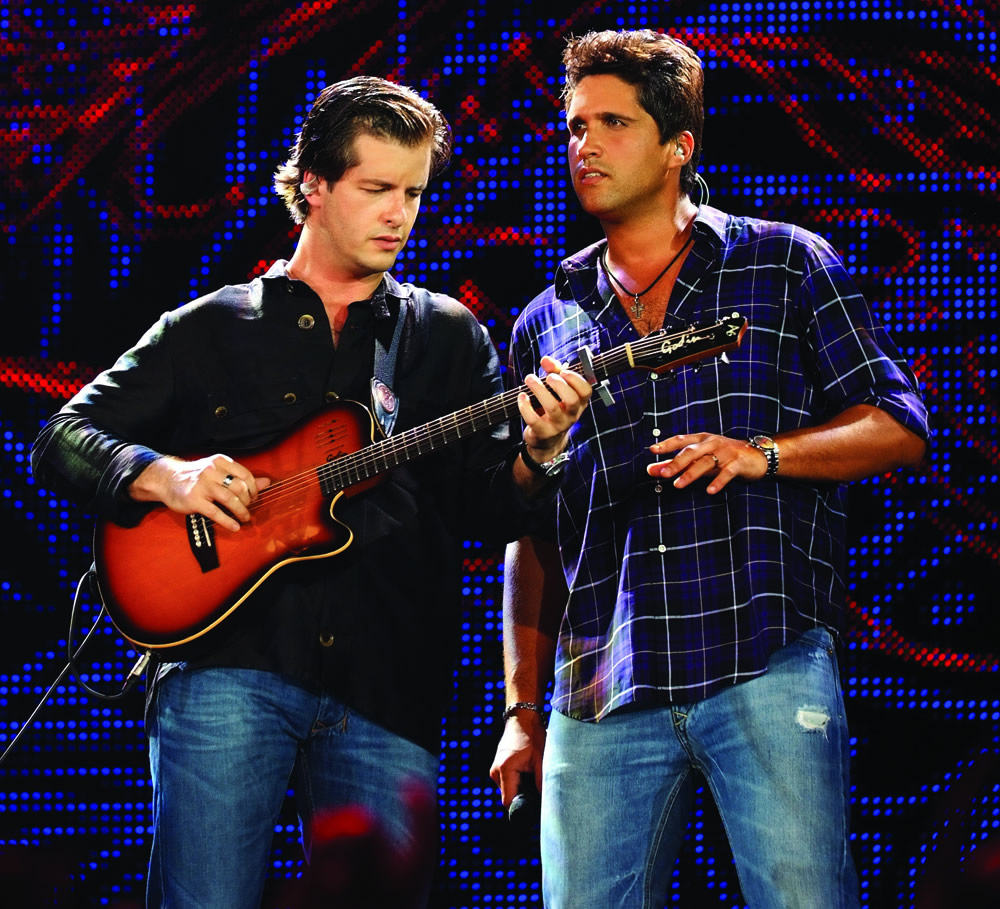
The sertanejo duo Victor & Leo spent four weeks at the top of the chart with their album Ao Vivo e em Cores.

Issue date^{a} ^{b}	Album	Artist(s)	Reference
June 22	Paraíso Nacional	Soundtrack	
June 29	Eu e o Tempo	Padre Fábio de Melo	
July 6	Greatest Hits History	Michael Jackson	
July 13	Thriller	Michael Jackson	
July 20	Thriller	Michael Jackson	
July 27	Paraíso Nacional	Soundtrack	
August 3	Paraíso Nacional	Soundtrack	
August 10	N9ve	Ana Carolina	
August 17	N9ve	Ana Carolina	
August 24	N9ve	Ana Carolina	
August 31	Caminho das Índias Internacional	Soundtrack	
September 7	Elas Cantam Roberto Carlos	Roberto Carlos	
September 14	Elas Cantam Roberto Carlos	Roberto Carlos	
September 21	Elas Cantam Roberto Carlos	Roberto Carlos	
September 28	Elas Cantam Roberto Carlos	Roberto Carlos	
October 5	Elas Cantam Roberto Carlos	Roberto Carlos	
October 12	Elas Cantam Roberto Carlos	Roberto Carlos	
October 19	Elas Cantam Roberto Carlos	Roberto Carlos	
October 26	Promessas	Various Artists	
November 2	Ao Vivo e em Cores	Victor & Leo	
November 9	Ao Vivo e em Cores	Victor & Leo	
November 16	Ao Vivo e em Cores	Victor & Leo	
November 23	Ao Vivo e em Cores	Victor & Leo	
December 14	Canta Jovem Guarda II	Raça Negra	

== See also ==
- 2009 in music

== Notes ==
- ^{[a]} The ABPD chart began on June 22, and, for this reason this list doesn't show weeks before that date.
- ^{[b]} The ABPD also did not divulge the chart for the first and for the last 2 weeks of December 2009. It also did not divulge for the week of 30 November.
