= The Life Aquatic Studio Sessions =

Studio album by Seu Jorge
- Released: November 22, 2005
- Recorded: Forum Music Village, Rome, Italy between 2004 and 2005
- Genres: MPB, folk
- Length: 53:40
- Language: Portuguese
- Label: Hollywood Records
- Producers: Wes Anderson and Randall Poster

Seu Jorge chronology
Cru (2005)	The Life Aquatic Studio Sessions (2005)	Ana & Jorge: Ao Vivo (2005)

Professional ratings
Review scores
Source	Rating
AllMusic	3.5/5 stars

The Life Aquatic Studio Sessions Featuring Seu Jorge is an album by Brazilian musician Seu Jorge. It is a collection of David Bowie songs (plus one original, "Team Zissou") Jorge recorded in Portuguese for the soundtrack to the film The Life Aquatic with Steve Zissou.

Five of the covers were featured on the original soundtrack of the film (but were rerecorded for this album), while seven were released on this album for the first time. The translation to Portuguese is not exact; Seu Jorge maintains the melodies and styles, but often varies the lyrics. Bowie himself praised his work, saying "Had Seu Jorge not recorded my songs in Portuguese, I would never have heard this new level of beauty which he has imbued them with."

== Track listing ==
All works composed by David Bowie except where noted.

1. "Rebel Rebel" – 2:46*
2. "Life on Mars?" – 3:29*
3. "Astronauta de Mármore (Starman)" – 3:16 (lyrics by Carlos Stein and Sady Homrich)*
4. "Ziggy Stardust" – 3:41
5. "Lady Stardust" – 3:31
6. "Changes" – 3:40
7. "Oh! You Pretty Things" – 3:32
8. "Rock N' Roll Suicide" – 3:10*
9. "Suffragette City" – 3:10
10. "Five Years" – 3:59*
11. "Queen Bitch" – 3:42
12. "When I Live My Dream" – 2:55
13. "Quicksand" – 4:35
14. "Team Zissou" – 2:32 (composed by Seu Jorge)
15. "Space Oddity" – 5:40 (iTunes Bonus Track)

*Featured in The Life Aquatic with Steve Zissou.
