= Ana Carolina (disambiguation) =

Ana Carolina (born 1974) is a Brazilian singer.

Ana Carolina may also refer to:

- Ana Carolina (album)
- Ana Carolina (director) (born 1943), Brazilian film director
- Ana Carolina da Fonseca (born 1978), Brazilian actress
