= Wrasse Records =

British record label

Wrasse Records is a British record label based in Ashtead, Surrey. It was started in 1998 by Ian and Jo Ashbridge. Both had been involved in the music industry prior to them starting up their own company. Its offices are based in the UK, but it distributes its CDs all around the world. In 2005, it licensed most of Universal Music's world music releases for distribution in the United States and the UK.

Wrasse Records specializes in world music, with artists such as Fela Kuti, Rachid Taha, Ismael Lo, Souad Massi, Angélique Kidjo, K'naan and Pink Martini.

Wrasse recording artist Seu Jorge appeared in the film The Life Aquatic with Steve Zissou (released November 2004), performing songs onscreen and on the official soundtrack album (released by a different label). This drew attention to Jorge and sparked sales of his coincident (September 2004) album Cru, helping to draw attention to the Wrasse label.

Humphead Records is an associated label specializing in country music.

== Artists ==
=== Lineup as of 2018 ===
- A.R. Rahman
- King Sunny Adé
- ALB
- Alexandros
- Tony Allen
- Amadou & Mariam
- Amparanoia
- Luc Arbogast
- Tina Arena
- Juliette Armanet
- Eleftheria Arvanitaki
- Hugues Aufray
- Ayo
- Charles Aznavour
- Barbara
- Alain Bashung
- The Bathers
- Franco Battiato
- Ben l'Oncle Soul
- Jorge Benjor
- Maria Bethânia
- Ryan Bingham
- Benjamin Biolay
- Jane Birkin
- David Bisbal
- Black Joe Lewis
- Blues Traveler
- Richard Bona
- Isabelle Boulay
- Georges Brassens
- Goran Bregovic
- Jacques Brel
- Dee Dee Bridgewater
- Brigitte
- Jonatha Brooke
- Gregg Kofi Brown
- Chico Buarque
- Yuri Buenaventura
- Calogero
- Bertrand Cantat
- Carlos do Carmo
- Matthieu Chedid
- Tony Christie
- Diego el Cigala
- Cocoon
- Couer de pirate
- Carmen Consoli
- Paulo Conte
- Manecas Costa
- Gal Costa
- Cesare Cremonini
- Daara J
- Etienne Daho
- Dalida
- Daniel Darc
- Vinicius De Moraes
- Manitas de Plata
- Noir Desir
- Kassé Mady Diabaté
- Cucu Diamantes
- Wasis Diop
- Lou Doillon
- Arielle Dombasle
- Duke Special
- Thomas Dutronc
- Elles and Barbara
- Emma Marrone
- Cat Empire
- Lara Fabian
- Fabri Fibra
- Faris
- Mylene Farmer
- Faudel
- Féfé
- Leo Ferre
- Tiziano Ferro
- Festival au Désert
- Patrick Fiori
- Fishbach
- Brigitte Fontaine
- China Forbes
- Donavon Frankenreiter
- Frero Delavega
- Freshlyground
- Serge Gainsbourg
- Lulu Gainsbourg
- Gilberto Gil
- Juliette Greco
- Guillemots
- Arthur H
- Tony Hadley
- Johnny Hallyday
- Morten Harket
- IAM
- Indochine
- Alkinoos Ioannidis
- Ivete Gil Caetano
- J Balvin
- Julien Jacob
- Kevin Johansen
- Seu Jorge
- Jovanotti
- Juanes
- Juliette
- Salif Keita
- Father Ray Kelly
- Khaled
- Angélique Kidjo
- Fela Anikulapo Kuti
- Femi Kuti
- Kyo
- La Grande Sophie
- Ladysmith Black Mambazo
- Bernard Lavilliers
- Marc Lavoine
- Fausto Leali
- Lenine
- Nolwenn Leroy
- Javier Limon
- Ismael Lo
- Lo'Jo
- Los de Abajo
- Louane
- Baaba Maal
- Ibrahim Maalouf
- Madredeus
- The Magnets
- Vusi Mahlasela
- Miriam Makeba
- Mali All Stars - Bogolan Music
- Mamas Gun
- Richard Marx
- Souad Massi
- Mireille Mathieu
- Ben Mazue
- Bobby McFerrin
- Medittaraneennes
- Iness Mezel
- Pablo Milanés
- Rhett Miller
- Eddy Mitchell
- Miyavi
- Yves Montand
- Marisa Montey
- Morley
- Ana Moura
- Nana Mouskouri
- Georges Moustaki
- Mungal
- Milton Nascimento
- On a tous quelque chose de Johnny (Tribute to Johnny)
- Orange Blossom
- Valdes Pablo Milanes and Chucho
- Florent Pagny
- Vanessa Paradis
- Perfume
- Pink Martini
- Michel Polnareff
- Dory Previn
- Radiokijada
- Radwimps
- Eros Ramazotti
- Randy Crawford & Joe Sample
- Raphaël
- Serge Reggiani
- Renaud
- Smokey Robinson
- Vasco Rossi
- Gaetan Roussel
- Sa Dingding
- Henri Salvador
- Amparo Sanchez
- Michel Sardou
- Emilie Simon
- Skatalites
- Luisa Sobral
- Sodagreen
- Mercedes Sosa
- Souchon Dans L'Air
- Idrissa Soumaoro
- Kristi Stassinopoulou
- Dave Stewart
- Alan Stivell
- Superbus
- Rachid Taha
- The Sachal Ensemble
- The Tubes
- Tiken Jah Fakoly
- Tinariwen
- Tom The Lion
- Diego Torres
- Boubacar Traoré
- Tribute to Bob Marley: La Lgende
- Judi Tzuke
- Caetano Veloso
- Village People
- The von Trapps
- Laurent Voulzy
- Megan Washington
- Christophe Willem
- Winterplay
- Yerba Buena
- Zazie
- Zucchero
