= Simone Saback =

SIMONE SABACK
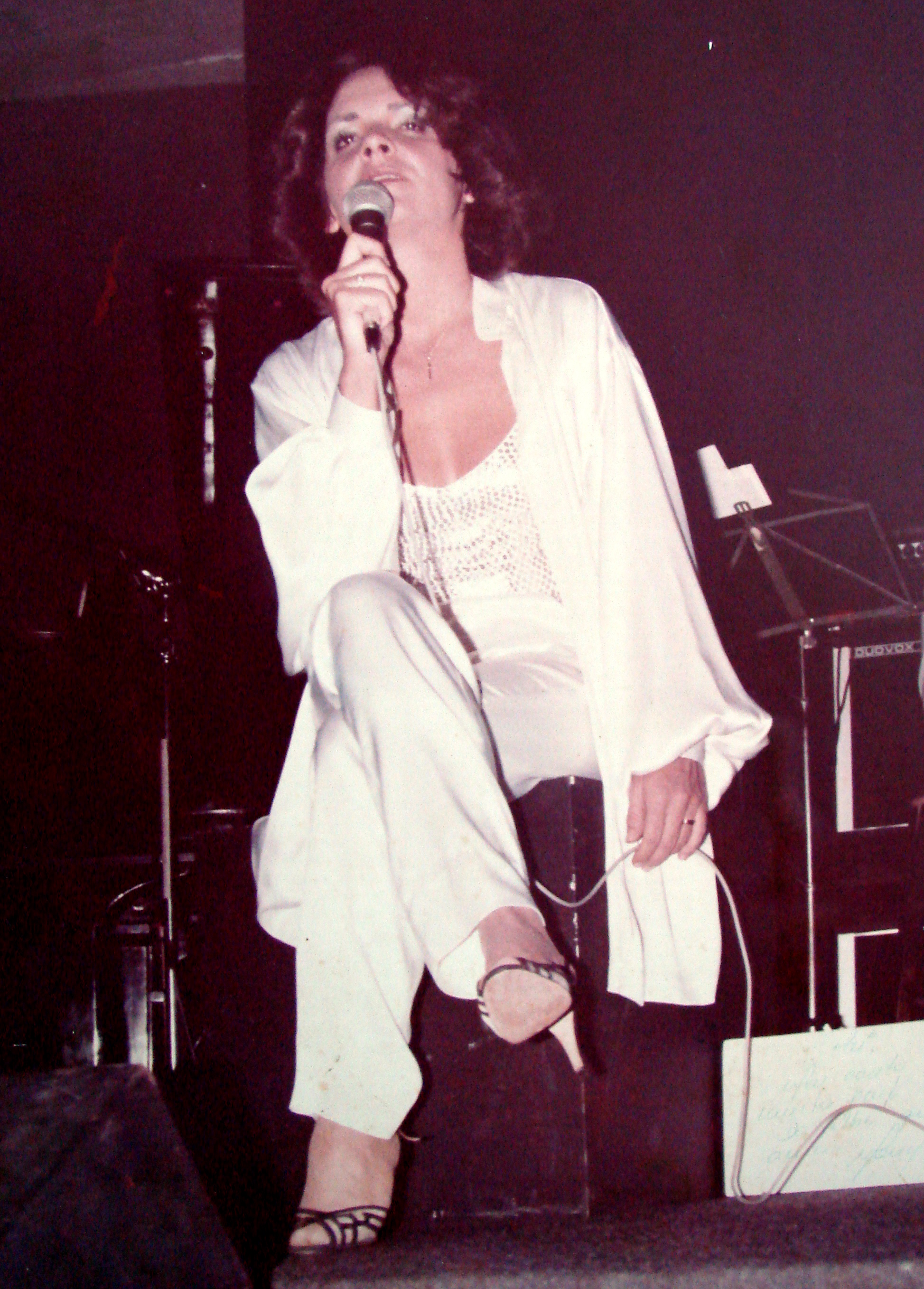
- Simone Saback performing at Show da Funarte in Brasil, 1978

Background information
- Born: Simone Barreto Saback; 25 February 1956 (age 70); Jacobina, Bahia
- Origin: Brazil
- Genres: MPB; Samba; Blues; Jazz; Pop
- Occupations: Composer songwriter singer
- Website: simonesaback.com Artist Spotify

Simone Saback (born 25 February 1956 in Jacobina, Bahia, Brazil) is a Brazilian composer, writer, screenwriter, poet and journalist.

Simone was born in Bahia and raised in Brasília. She began composing as a teenager, revealing innate musical talent of eclectic style. In the late 1970s, she accepted the invitation from Alvim Barbosa, then director of Sala Funarte in Brasília, to perform her first show, thus beginning her career as a singer. For four years she performed several shows praised in the Brazilian capital and throughout the country, performing three seasons at Sala Funarte. However, soon after she decides to move away from the stage and dedicate herself to journalism and showbiz, maintaining her artistic activity as a composer and writer.

In 2002, the increasingly intense musical partnerships make her move to Rio de Janeiro. In that decade, she bursts as composer in the voices of Zélia Duncan and Frejat, with the song Mãos Atadas. The recording was homage from Zélia to Cássia Eller, with whom she used to sing the blues on the musical scene of Brasília, in the early 80's. From then on, her compositions have been recorded by many singers, among other artists, by Fábio Jr., Leonardo, Dillo Daraujo, Ronaldo Barcelos, by the duo Zélia Duncan and Simone and by Ana Carolina, who released the hit Vai.

In 2012, the unpublished song Flor do Sol – composed thirty years before in partnership with Cássia Eller and recorded on a simple cassette tape – was released as a single by Porangareté label. The track, reworked by Chico Chico (Eller's son), with his participation and Cássia's former musicians, was officially released on TV Globo's "Fantástico", to celebrate the day Cássia Eller would have turned 50.

In 2016, Simone Saback releases another single: Mãos Atadas, in the voices and guitars of herself and Cássia Eller's. This track is also based on the recording of their rehearsal on a simple cassette tape, and carried out at Simone's house in 1982. The record was digitized and arranged by the Brazilian musician Dillo Daraujo.

== Recorded songs ==
- Mãos Atadas [Simone Saback] – Simone Saback & Cássia Eller (Independent single, 2016)
- Flor do Sol – [Cássia Eller & Simone Saback] – Cássia Eller (CD "O Espírito do Som", Vol. I – Segredo, Porangareté, 2015)
- O Que Você Quiser – [Ronaldo Barcellos e Simone Saback] – Ronaldo Barcellos (Independent single, 2014)
- Me Ajuda Aí [Simone Saback] – Leila Pinheiro (Independent single, 2014)
- Flor do Sol [Cássia Eller & Simone Saback] – Cássia Eller (Independent, distributed by Universal, 2012)
- Duas Caras (Espelho Seu) [Dillo Daraujo & Simone Saback] – Angel Duarte (Independent, 2012)
- Deixa de Bobagem [Ronaldo Barcellos & Simone Saback] – Ronaldo Barcellos (CD "Motel das Estrelas", Independent, 2012)
- Vai [Simone Saback] – Leonardo (CD "Alucinação", Universal Music, 2010)
- Mensagem do Tempo [Simone Saback] – Dillo Daraujo (DVD "Música Roqueira Popular Brasileira", Independent, 2010)
- Duas Caras (Espelho Seu) [Dillo Daraujo & Simone Saback] – Dillo Daraujo (DVD "Música Roqueira Popular Brasileira", Independent, 2010)
- Vida, Onde É Que Foi Parar? [Simone Saback | Versão: Ricky Vallen] – Ricky Vallen (CD & DVD "Ricky Vallen ao Vivo", Sony BMG Brasil, 2009)
- Vai (Ao Vivo) [Simone Saback] – Ana Carolina (CD & DVD "Multishow Ao Vivo Ana Carolina Dois Quartos", Armazém / Sony BMG Brasil, 2008)
- Me Esqueci Aí [Simone Saback] – Andrea França (CD "Sal Com Açúcar", Independent, 2007)
- Vai [Simone Saback] – Ana Carolina (CD Duplo "Dois Quartos" & CD "Quarto", Sony BMG Brasil, 2006/2007)
- Mãos Atadas [Simone Saback] – Zélia Duncan & Simone (CD e DVD "Amigo É Casa", Biscoito Fino, 2007)
- Mãos Atadas [Simone Saback] – Zélia Duncan (DVD "Pré Pós Tudo Bossa Band – O Show", Universal Music, 2006)
- Mãos Atadas [Simone Saback] – Zélia Duncan & Frejat (CD "Pré Pós Tudo Bossa Band", Universal Music, 2005)
- Se Quiser Vai [Simone Saback] – Fábio Jr. (CD "Acústico", Sony BMG Brasil, 2002)
