= The Very Best of Ladysmith Black Mambazo – Rain, Rain, Beautiful Rain =

Greatest hits album by Ladysmith Black Mambazo
- Released: November 2004
- Recorded: 1973–2004
- Genre: Isicathamiya
- Label: Gallo Record Company (original recordings); Wrasse Records (compilation)
- Producer: Joseph Shabalala

Ladysmith Black Mambazo chronology
Raise Your Spirit Higher (2004)	The Very Best of Ladysmith Black Mambazo – Rain, Rain, Beautiful Rain (2004)	No Boundaries (2005)

The Very Best of Ladysmith Black Mambazo – Rain, Rain, Beautiful Rain is a 2-disc compilation album by the South African isicathamiya group Ladysmith Black Mambazo. It was released in the United Kingdom in November 2004, to coincide with the group's tour of the UK that month.

The album contains many well-known songs by the group, spanning songs mainly from the late 1980s to newly recorded versions (and a few 1970s tracks), such as "Homeless" (composed by Mambazo leader Joseph Shabalala and Paul Simon), "Nomathemba", and many more.

== Track listing ==
Disc 1

1. "Rain Rain Beautiful Rain"
2. "How Long?"
3. "Inkanyezi Nezazi (The Star and the Wiseman)"
4. "Swing Low Sweet Chariot" featuring China Black
5. "(Nkosi Sikelel' iAfrika) Shosholoza"
6. "Hello My Baby"
7. "Knockin' On Heaven's Door" featuring Dolly Parton
8. "Music Knows No Boundaries"
9. "Sisesiqhingini (Everything is So Stupid, Stupid, Stupid)"
10. "Wenza Ngani (How Did You Do That?)"
11. "Homeless"
12. "Halala South Africa (Congratulations South Africa)"
13. "Isimanga Salomhlaba (The Wonder Of this World)"
14. "Dlondlobala Njalo (Preserve South Africa's Traditional Culture)"
15. "Amazing Grace"
16. "Silent Night"

Disc 2

1. "Diamonds On The Soles Of Her Shoes" featuring Paul Simon
2. "Mbube (Wimoweh)"
3. "Qed'usizi"
4. "New York City"
5. "Ain't No Sunshine" featuring Des'ree
6. "Iningi Liyabon Ububende (Many Spoil the Broth)"
7. "Udidekil' Umhlaba (Lord's Work)"
8. "Because I Love You"
9. "Lifikile Ivangeli (The Gospel Has Arrived)"
10. "Chain Gang" featuring Lou Rawls
11. "Oh Happy Day"
12. "Abezizwe (Uniting Nations Together)"
13. "Isimanga Sikathekwane (The Wonder of the Hammerhead Bird)" Remix
14. "Black is Beautiful"
15. "Halleluya"
16. "Nomathemba (Mother of Hope)"
