= Son Rompe Pera =

Mexican band

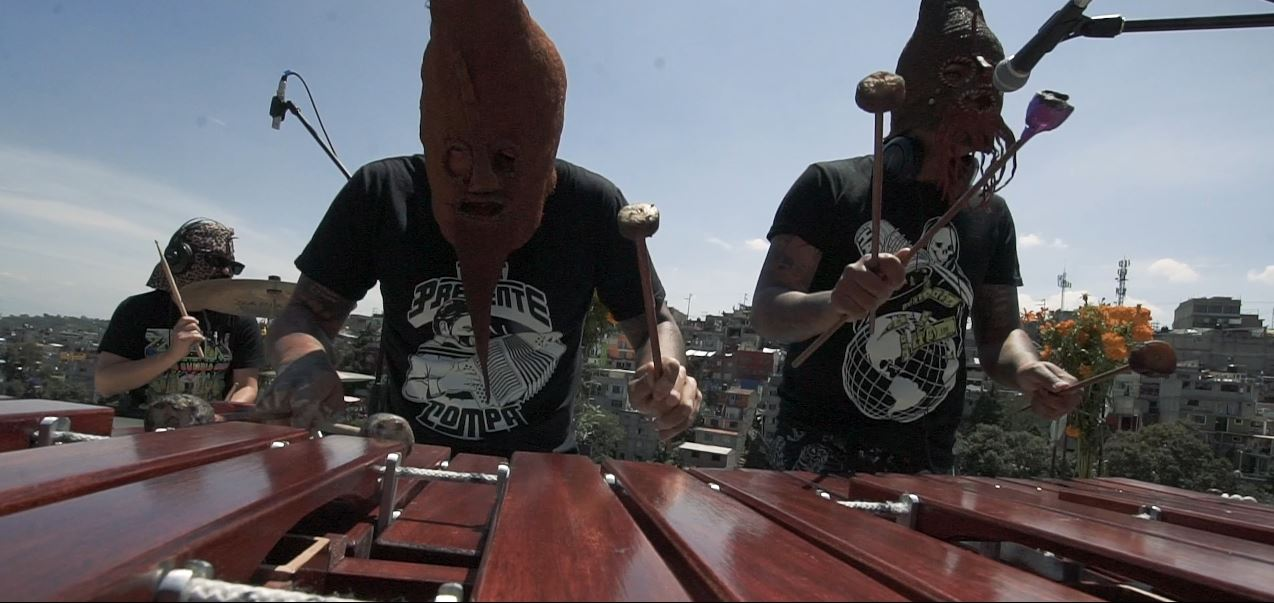

Background information
- Origin: Naucalpan, State of Mexico, Mexico
- Genres: cumbia, Mexican marimba music, danzón, rock
- Years active: 2017–present
- Members: Jesús "Kacho" Gama; Allan "Mongo" Gama; Raúl Albarrán; Ricardo "Ritchie" López; José Ángel "Kilos" Gama; Cana Murillo

Son Rompe Pera is a Mexican fusion band based in Naucalpan, a suburb of Mexico City. Primarily playing cumbia, they integrate the use of Mexican marimba music that is traditional in the folklore of their country and such other genres as danzón, rock, ska and others.

== History ==
Son Rompe Pera was formed in 2017 by brothers Jesús "Kacho" Gama and Allan "Mongo" Gama. Their late father, José Dolores "Batuco" Gama Melchor, owned a marimba, so the Gama brothers played alongside him in the streets and at weddings and parties. The band's name is a reference to their mother's name, Esperanza "Pera" Ruiz.

While playing in La Lagunilla flea market, they were heard by Chico Trujillo's agent, Timothy “Timo” Bisig, who invited them to play a concert with Celso Piña and Sonido Gallo Negro in the Carpa Astros of Mexico City. After a trip to Chile at the invitation of Aldo Asenjo "El Macha" of Chico Trujillo, they joined concerts of Macha's projects: Chico Trujillo, La Floripondio, and Bloque Depresivo.

Their debut album, Batuco, named after their father, was critically acclaimed. In 2022 they recorded a session for NPR's Tiny Desk Concerts series at Salón Los Ángeles and performed at the main stage of Vive Latino festival, featuring Alberto Pedraza, Alí Gua Gua from Kumbia Queers, Mare Advertencia Lírika and Belafonte Sensacional. In 2024, they performed at Coachella music festival.

Their influences include Colombian cumbia legend Andrés Landero, Mexican marimba groups such as Marimba Cuquita, Chicano music as Lalo Guerrero, whose song "Los chucos suaves" they perform, as well as American and British rock bands such as Green Day, the Misfits, The Clash, and Mexican rock bands like Mi Banda El Mexicano and Belafonte Sensacional.

== Members ==
- Allan "Mongo" Gama - marimba, electric guitar
- Jesús "Kacho" Gama - marimba
- Raúl "Raven" Albarrán - bass guitar
- Ricardo "Ritchie" López - drums
- José Ángel "Kilos" Gama - percussion
- Cana Murillo - percussion

== Discography ==
- 2020 — Batuco (AYA Records/ ZZK Records)
- 2023 — Chimborazo (AYA Records/ZZK Records)
