= Carolina (Seu Jorge album) =

Studio album by Seu Jorge
- Released: November 25, 2003
- Genre: World music
- Length: 54:03
- Label: Mr Bongo

Seu Jorge chronology
Moro no Brasil (1998)	Carolina (2003)	Cru (2005)

Carolina is a 2001 album by Seu Jorge. Originally known as Samba Esporte Fino when released in Brazil in 2001, it was retitled Carolina and released internationally in 2003.

== Track listing ==
All tracks are written by Seu Jorge except where noted.

No.	Title	Writer(s)	Length
1.	"Carolina"		5:53
2.	"Chega no Suingue"		3:44
3.	"Mangueira"		4:26
4.	"Pequinês e Pitbull"	Aranha, Gabriel Moura, Jovi Joviniano	3:51
5.	"Te Queria"	Elisio de Búzios	4:15
6.	"O Samba Taí"	Seu Jorge, Sérgio Pell	4:53
7.	"Hágua"	Seu Jorge, Gabriel Moura, Jovi Joviniano	4:03
8.	"Samba que nem Rita à Dora"	Jane, Luis Carlos da Vila	5:06
9.	"Madá"		4:31
10.	"Funky Baby"		4:24
11.	"Em Nagoya Eu Vi Eriko"	Jorge Ben Jor	4:45
12.	"De Alegria Raiou o Dia"	Dom Mita, Carlos Dafé	4:00
