= Estampado =

Studio album by Ana Carolina
- Released: January 8, 2003
- Recorded: In 2002 and 2003
- Studio: A&R studios
- Genre: MPB, alternative dance, pop
- Length: 56:12
- Label: BMG Brazil
- Producer: Remo Brandalise, Jefferson, Marisa, Liminha, Ana Carolina

studio albums by Ana Carolina chronology
Ana Rita Joana Iracema e Carolina (2001)	Estampado (2003)	Dois Quartos (2006)

Singles from Estampado
- 1. "Encostar na Tua"; 2. "Elevador (Livro de Esquecimento)"; 3. "Uma Louca Tempestade"; 4. "Nua"

Professional ratings
Review scores
Source	Rating
Clique Music	3.5/5 stars

Estampado (In English: "Stamped") is the third studio album from Brazilian singer Ana Carolina, released on January 8, 2003. The album features Seu Jorge on the song "O Beat da Beata". It sold 200,000 in Brazil, being certified platinum twice.

== Track listing ==
No.	Title	Music	Length
1.	"Hoje eu tô sozinha"	Ana Carolina	4:30
2.	"Encostar na Tua"	Ana Carolina	4:11
3.	"2 Bicudos"	Totonho Villeroy	3:56
4.	"Elevador (Livro de Esquecimento)"	Ana Carolina	3:15
5.	"Só Fala em Mim"	Ana Carolina, Totonho Villeroy, Celso Fonseca	3:45
6.	"É Hora da Virada"	Ana Carolina, Totonho Villeroy, Eugenio Dale	3:08
7.	"Uma Louca Tempestade"	Totonho Villeroy, Bebeto Alves	4:31
8.	"Pra Rua me Levar"	Ana Carolina, Totonho Villeroy	3:49
9.	"É Mágoa"	Ana Carolina	4:09
10.	"Mais Que Isso"	Ana Carolina, Chico César	3:55
11.	"Vox Populi"	Ana Carolina	2:25
12.	"Vestido Estampado"	Ana Carolina	3:04
13.	"Nua"	Ana Carolina, Vitor Ramil	4:03
14.	"Não Fale Desse Jeito"	Ana Carolina, Seu Jorge	3:22
15.	"O Beat da Beata"	Ana Carolina, Seu Jorge	3:57

== Charts ==
=== Year-end charts ===
Chart (2006)	Peak position
Brazilian Albums (Pro-Música Brasil)	5

Chart (2007)	Peak position
Brazilian Albums (Pro-Música Brasil)	16

== Certifications ==
Country	Certification(s) (sales thresholds)
Brazil	2× Platinum

== Participation in soundtracks ==
1. "Uma Louca Tempestade" was part of the soundtrack of the novel "Senhora do Destino" of Rede Globo.
2. "Nua" was part of the soundtrack of the novel "Como Uma Onda" of Rede Globo.
3. "Pra Rua Me Levar" was part of the soundtrack of the novel "America's" Rede Globo.
4. "Encostar Na Tua" on the soundtrack of the soap opera "Celebridade" of Rede Globo.

== Personnel ==
1. Liminha – producer
2. Ana Carolina – co-producer
3. Sérgio Bittencourt – artistic direction
4. Marilene Gondim Toward – director of production
5. Remo Brandasile – executive producer
6. Jefferson – executive producer
7. Marisa – executive producer
