= Antonio Monda =

Italian writer, filmmaker and professor

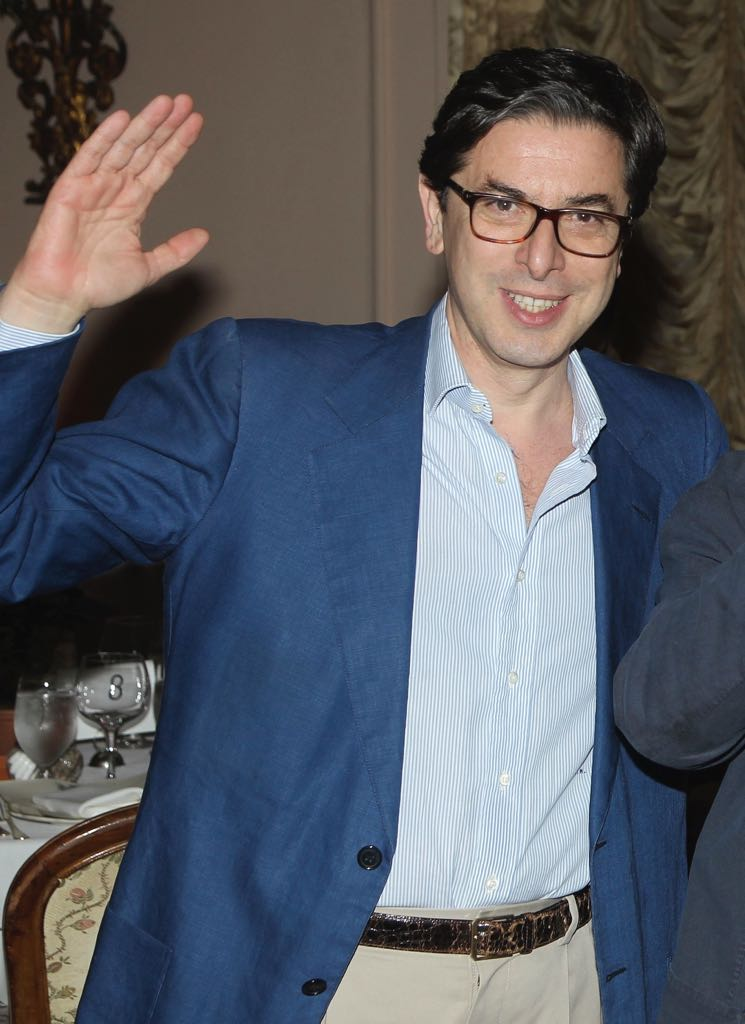
Antonio Monda

Antonio Monda (born 19 October 1962) is an Italian writer, filmmaker, essayist, and professor at New York University's Tisch School of the Arts. He is a promoter of the arts, in particular film and literature.

== Interviews and cultural life ==
The New York Times wrote, "Mr. Monda connected with New York viscerally, though his particular affinity was for the city's Jewish-American experience. It might seem curious, since Mr. Monda is a practicing Catholic, educated by Jesuits. Today he still seems surprised by the attraction. "All of a sudden I discovered everything I like – music-wise, novel-wise – is either written, composed, or directed by a Jew", he said. He immersed himself in the writing of Singer ("my hero"), Saul Bellow, Norman Mailer and Mr. Roth, as well as in Mr. Allen's films, in Arthur Miller's plays and in George Gershwin and Bob Dylan. Next, he had an idea, to make a documentary for Italian audiences on Jewish-American authors. He interviewed as many of them as he could and in each case began with a blunt question: "Why do I like you?" This style caught the attention of director Wes Anderson, who cast Monda as himself in the film The Life Aquatic and included a parody—a DVD extra called "Mondo Monda" in which Monda asks such questions of Anderson and his associate, co-screenwriter Noah Baumbach, to befuddled reactions.

Monda often manages to use his interview connections for book topics, public speaker series, or social gatherings.

Amongst those he has interviewed are: Saul Bellow, Jonathan Franzen, Nathan Englander, Toni Morrison, Philip Roth, Martin Amis, Zadie Smith, Don DeLillo, EL Doctorow, Annie Proulx and Elie Wiesel appear in his books Do You Believe? and Il Paradiso dei lettori innamorati.

== Festivals ==
A promoter of Italian-American cultural relations, he is a champion of anglophone writers in Italy and, according to The New York Times, a "one-man Italian cultural institute". Monda is also famous for his writers' and artists' salon in his Upper West Side, Manhattan apartment, where Meryl Streep, Al Pacino, Tom Hanks, Don DeLillo, Bernardo Bertolucci, Derek Walcott, Paul Auster, Martin Scorsese, Philip Roth and Arthur Miller have mingled. The New York Times wrote: "In his Upper West Side apartment, Mr. Monda reigns as the host of the city's liveliest, some say only remaining, cultural salon". However, the word "salon" makes him wince. He prefers "laboratory of ideas." (...) "Mr. Monda's history, in all its facets, has molded him into more than a genial host and more than a champion of cultural networking. Having abandoned much of his own past, he has embraced the task of preserving Manhattan's cultural memory of itself through what he calls "my two great passions, American literature and films. (…) Mr. Monda, the Italian expatriate, has become a custodian of New York glories". On March 4, 2015, Il Foglio published a profile by Annalena Benini entitled "The art of being Antonio Monda". Antonio Di Bella has dedicated to his cultural salon the song "85th and Central Park West".

== List of books ==
- La Magnifica Illusione 2003 (published by Fazi Editore updated and extended in 2007)
- The Hidden God (published by MoMA) (2004)
- Do you Believe? Conversations on God and Religion (2007) (published by Vintage)
- Assoluzione (published by Mondadori in 2008)
- Hanno preferito le tenebre. Dodici storie del male, Arnoldo Mondadori Editore, 2010 ISBN 978-88-04-56479-9
- Lontano dai sogni (published by Mondadori, in 2011)
- L'america non-esiste (published by Mondadori, in 2012)
- Il paradiso dei lettori innamorati (published by Mondadori, in 2013)
- Nella città nuda (published by Rizzoli, in 2013)
- La casa sulla roccia (published by Mondadori, in 2014)
- Ota Benga (published by Mondadori, in 2015)
- L'indegno (published by Mondadori, in 2016)
- L'evidenza delle cose non viste (published by Mondadori, in 2017)
- Io sono il fuoco (published by Mondadori, in 2018)
- Nel territorio del diavolo (published by Mondadori, in 2019)
- Il principe del mondo (published by Mondadori, in 2021)
- Il numero è nulla (published by Mondadori, in 2023)
- Incontri ravvicinati (La Nave di Teseo, in 2024)
- Una mattina gloriosa (published by Mondadori, in 2026)
