= N9ve =

Studio album by Ana Carolina
- Released: August 7, 2009
- Recorded: In 2009, the studios Co. dos Técnicos, Toca do Bandido, Blue Studios, Estúdio Monoaural, Legacy Studio (Nova Iorque), Estúdios Mega, Press Play Studio (Londres).
- Genres: MPB, alternative dance, pop, bossa nova, electronic tango, samba
- Languages: Portuguese, english, italian
- Label: Sony BMG Music Entertainment
- Producers: Alê Siqueira, Mario Caldato Jr, Kassin

Ana Carolina chronology
Multishow Ao Vivo: Dois Quartos (2008)	N9ve (2009)	Ana Car9lina + Um (2009)

Singles from N9ve
- 1. "Entreolhares" Released: July 29, 2009; 2. "10 Minutos (Dimmi Perché)" Released: March 2010

N9ve is the eighth album by Brazilian singer, songwriter, arranger, producer Ana Carolina. Launched in 2009, the album received a certified Gold record in Brazil by ABPD due by more than 50 000 copies sold in the country.

== Promotion and world tour ==
The tour starts on September 9, 2009 – the day the singer full 35 years – at Citibank Hall, Rio de Janeiro. On August 22, 2009 Ana sang the album's first single, glances at the "Criança Espernaça". A note on the official site of the singer announced that the start date of the tour will no longer be September 9 and, later, the fan club Donana Carolina released through the site, Twitter and his blog the event dates.

Nove World Tour

The tour of "N9ve" began on November 14, in São Paulo and so far she has gone through several cities in Brazil and Europe such as Barcelona, Paris, Madrid, Rome and Zurich.

== Track list ==
No.	Title	Music	Length
1.	"10 Minutos (Dimmi Perché)"	Ana Carolina, Chiara Civello	3:47
2.	"Dentro"	Ana Carolina, Dudu Falcão	4:28
3.	"Tá Rindo, É?"	Ana Carolina, Mombaça, Antônio Villeroy	4:03
4.	"Entreolhares (The Way You're Looking at Me)" (featuring John Legend)	Ana Carolina, John Stephens, Antônio Villeroy	3:26
5.	"Era"	Ana Carolina	4:41
6.	"8 Estórias"	Ana Carolina, Chiara Civello	4:20
7.	"Resta" (featuring Chiara Civello)	Ana Carolina, Chiara Civello, Dulce Quental	5:49
8.	"Torpedo"	Ana Carolina, Mombaça, Gilberto Gil	3:54
9.	"Traição" (featuring Esperanza Spalding and Daniel Jobim)	Ana Carolina, Chiara Civello	4:43
Total length:			38:56

== Certifications ==
Country	Certification(s) (sales thresholds)
Brazil	Gold

== See also ==
- List of number-one albums of 2009 (Brazil)
