= The Life Aquatic with Steve Zissou (soundtrack) =

Soundtrack album by various artists
- Released: December 14, 2004
- Length: 59:58
- Label: Hollywood
- Producers: Mark Mothersbaugh; Robert Casale; Wes Anderson

Professional ratings
Review scores
Source	Rating
Allmusic	4/5 stars

The Life Aquatic with Steve Zissou is a 2004 soundtrack to the Wes Anderson film of the same name.

== Track listing ==
1. "Shark Attack Theme" – Sven Libaek
2. Loquasto International Film Festival – Mark Mothersbaugh
3. "Life on Mars?" – David Bowie
4. "Starman" – Seu Jorge
5. Let Me Tell You About My Boat – Mark Mothersbaugh
6. "Rebel Rebel" – Seu Jorge
7. Zissou Society Blue Star Cadets / Ned's Theme Take 1 – Mark Mothersbaugh
8. "Gut Feeling" – Devo
9. "Open Sea Theme" – Sven Libaek
10. "Rock & Roll Suicide" – Seu Jorge
11. "Here's To You" – Ennio Morricone featuring Joan Baez
12. We Call Them Pirates Out Here – Mark Mothersbaugh
13. "Search and Destroy" – The Stooges
14. "La Niña de Puerta Oscura" – Paco de Lucía
15. "Life on Mars?" – Seu Jorge
16. Ping Island / Lightning Strike Rescue Op – Mark Mothersbaugh
17. "Five Years" – Seu Jorge
18. "30 Century Man" – Scott Walker
19. "The Way I Feel Inside" – The Zombies
20. "Queen Bitch" – David Bowie

== Production ==
Several songs are featured in the film but do not appear on the soundtrack, including "Starálfur" by Sigur Rós (from the climactic Jaguar shark scene), and some of Seu Jorge's performances of David Bowie songs. A more complete compilation of Seu Jorge's performances can be found on The Life Aquatic Studio Sessions Featuring Seu Jorge (released by Hollywood Records on November 22, 2005). The two-disc Criterion Collection release of the movie also features his performances as a special feature.

The soundtrack includes several instrumental pieces by Australian composer Sven Libaek – originally written for the 1970s Australian TV documentary series Inner Space by Ron Taylor and Valerie Taylor – which Anderson reportedly selected at the suggestion of actor Noah Taylor. "Shark Attack Theme" is a variation on the series' main title music; "Open Sea Theme's" original title is "Thatcherie".

In addition to the use of both original David Bowie recordings and Bowie covers by Seu Jorge, the soundtrack includes two songs – "Search and Destroy" by The Stooges, and "Gut Feeling" by Devo, that had been produced or co-produced by Bowie.

Although Anderson worked with Devo cofounder Mark Mothersbaugh for the soundtrack for this and all of his prior movies, this soundtrack marks the first time one of Devo's songs, "Gut Feeling," was used in a Wes Anderson film. Mothersbaugh's Devo bandmate Bob Casale (aka "Bob 2") co-produced the soundtrack with Mothersbaugh.
