= Multishow ao Vivo: Ana Carolina - Dois Quartos =

Live album by Ana Carolina
- Released: May 6, 2008
- Recorded: November 24 and 25, 2007
- Venue: Credicard Hall, São Paulo, Brazil
- Genre: MPB, alternative dance, pop, acoustic, bossa nova, samba
- Length: 1:03:00
- Language: Portuguese, english
- Label: Sony BMG, Armazém
- Director: Rodrigo Carelli
- Producer: Ana Carolina e Marcelo Sussekind

Ana Carolina chronology
Dois Quartos (2006)	Multishow ao Vivo: Ana Carolina - Dois Quartos (2008)	N9ve (2009)

Singles from Multishow ao Vivo: Ana Carolina - Dois Quartos
- 1. "Vai" Released: 2007; 2. "Tolerância" Released: 2008

Multishow ao Vivo: Ana Carolina - Dois Quartos is the second live album and fourth DVD by Brazilian singer Ana Carolina, released on May 6, 2008, through Sony BMG and Armazém.

== Background ==
Recorded for the Multishow ao Vivo series at Credicard Hall, in São Paulo, on November 24 and 25, 2007, the show brings together consecrated songs from his career and hits from the double studio album Dois Quartos. There are also two unpublished songs: "Eu Que Não Sei Nunca do Mar", written in partnership with Jorge Vercillo and recorded by Maria Bethânia; and "Cabide", recorded by Mart'nália, in addition to the re-recording of "Três", by Marina Lima.

The show was also controversial for bringing profanity and obscene sexual expressions, in the songs ''Cantinho'' and ''Eu Sou Melhor Que Você''.

The original project included three concerts for the album, on November 23, 24 and 25, 2007. The first concert was not recorded. In the last show, in turn, the song "Garganta" and a remix of roses were not included on the CD or DVD.

The DVD features, as bonus material, an interview with Ana, the making-of the show and Ana's comments on some tracks from the show. It sold 100,000 copies in Brazil, being certified platinum.

== Track List ==
=== CD ===
1. Cantinho / Fever / Eu sou melhor que você
2. Eu comi a Madona
3. Rosas
4. Tolerância
5. Carvão
6. Eu que não sei quase nada do mar
7. Nada te faltará
8. O Cristo de madeira
9. Texto / É isso aí (The blower's daughter)
10. Ruas de outono
11. Aqui / Quem de nós dois (La mia storia tra le dita)
12. Milhares de sambas
13. Cabide
14. Um edifício no meio do mundo
15. Vai

=== DVD ===
1. Cantinho / Fever / Eu sou melhor que você
2. Eu comi a Madona
3. Rosas
4. Tolerância
5. Carvão
6. Eu que não sei quase nada do mar
7. Confesso / Trancado / Nua / Pra rua me levar / Encostar na tua
8. Nada te faltará
9. O Cristo de madeira
10. Texto / É isso aí (The Blower's Daughter)
11. Ruas de outono
12. Aqui
13. Quem de nós dois (La Mia Storia Tra Le Dita)
14. Três
15. Manhã / Sinais de fogo
16. Um edifício no meio do mundo
17. Milhares de sambas
18. Cabide
19. Chevette
20. 1.100,00 (Nega marrenta)
21. Notícias populares
22. Uma louca tempestade
23. Elevador (Livro de esquecimento)
24. Eu comi a Madona (remix) (feat. DJ Zé Pedro)
25. Vai (bonus track)

== Charts ==
=== Year-end charts ===
Chart (2008)	Peak position
Brazilian Albums (Pro-Música Brasil)	9

== Certifications ==
=== Album ===
Region	Certification	Certified units/sales
Brazil (Pro-Música Brasil)	Gold	50,000^{*}
^{*} Sales figures based on certification alone.

=== DVD ===
Region	Certification	Certified units/sales
Brazil (Pro-Música Brasil)	2× Platinum	100,000^{*}
^{*} Sales figures based on certification alone.
