= Cru (album) =

Studio album by Seu Jorge
- Released: September 21, 2004
- Genre: Acoustic, world music
- Length: 46:05
- Label: Wrasse Records
- Producer: Gringo Da Parada

Seu Jorge chronology
Carolina (2001)	Cru (2004)	The Life Aquatic Studio Sessions (2005)

Professional ratings
Review scores
Source	Rating
AllMusic	4/5 stars

Cru is a 2004 album by Seu Jorge first released in France on September 21, 2004 by the Parisian independent label Fla-Flu (Favela Chic) with the record company Naïve. This was his second album to be released outside his native Brazil, the first being Carolina. Many of the songs on the album are covers such as "Chatterton", written by Serge Gainsbourg and "Don't" by Leiber & Stoller. The album also includes political and social commentary in songs such as "Mania de Peitão" and "Eu Sou Favela".

The song "Tive Razão" was featured in FIFA 07 by EA Sports.

== Track listing ==
1. "Tive Razão" (I Was Right) (Seu Jorge) – 4:32
2. "Mania de Peitão" (Large Chested Mania) (Bento Amorim, Jorge) – 2:37
3. "Chatterton" (Gainsbourg) – 3:52
4. "Fiore de la Città" (Robertinho Brant) – 4:19
5. "Bem Querer" (My Dear) (Carlos Da Fé, Dom Mita) – 3:21
6. "Don't" (Jerry Leiber, Mike Stoller) – 3:07
7. "São Gonça" (Jorge) – 4:22
8. "Bola de Meia" (Sock-Filled Ball) (Duani) – 5:25
9. "Una Mujer" (A woman) (Murilo Antunes, Brant) – 4:37
10. "Eu Sou Favela" (I Am Favela) (Noca Da Portela, Sergio Mosca) – 2:27
11. "Mania de Peitao*" (Jamais Plus Jamais Mix) (Amorim, Jorge) – 2:48
12. "Tive Razão*" (Voltair Mix) (Jorge) – 4:38

== Personnel ==
- Marcelo Aube – Bass
- Robertinho Brant – Guitar (Acoustic), Arranger, Vocals (background), Handclapping
- Edmundo Carneiro – Percussion
- Mathieu Chédid – Guitar (Acoustic)
- Gringo DaParada – Synthesizer, Arranger, Vocals (background), Handclapping, Producer, Synthesizer Bass
- Pretinho DaSerrinha – Percussion, Arranger, Vocals (background), Handclapping, Cavaquinho
- Rafael Doria – Logo
- Fabio Fonseca – Synthesizer
- Seu Jorge – Guitar (Acoustic), Bass, Arranger, Vocals (background), Handclapping, Adaptation, Wah Wah Guitar
- Renaud Letang – Mixing
- André Perillat – Mastering
- Benoit Peverelli – Photography
- Alexandre Rabaço – Engineer
- Claudio Manetta Scott – Artwork
