= Top Álbuns Brasil =

Former Brazilian official sales chart

Top Álbuns Brasil (previously CD – TOP 20 Semanal ABPD or CD TOP 20) was a Brazilian official sales chart for musical releases. All rankings are researched and compiled by Nielsen and published by Pro-Música Brasil.

== See also ==
- List of number-one albums of 2009 (Brazil)
