= Ana Rita Joana Iracema e Carolina =

Studio album by Ana Carolina
- Released: March 29, 2001
- Recorded: In 2001, "A&R and Gorila Mix" Studios
- Genre: MPB, alternative dance, pop
- Length: 55:51
- Label: BMG
- Producer: Luciana David, Nilo Romero, Marcelo Sussekind, Dunga, Gabriela Azevedo, Klebis Cavalcante

Ana Carolina chronology
Ana Carolina (1999)	Ana Rita Joana Iracema e Carolina (2001)	Estampado (2003)

Singles from Ana Rita Joana Iracema e Carolina
- 1. "Ela É Bamba"; 2. "Confesso"; 3. "Quem de Nós Dois"

Professional ratings
Review scores
Source	Rating
allmusic	3/5 stars
Clique Music	3.5/5 stars

Ana Rita Joana Iracema e Carolina is the second studio album from Brazilian singer Ana Carolina, available in 2001, has the participation of Alcione (Violão e Voz) and Claudia Raia (Dadivosa). It sold 250 000 in Brazil, being certified platinum.

== Track list ==
Ana Rita Joana Iracema e Carolina
No.	Title	Music	Length
1.	"O Rio"	Ana Carolina	3:12
2.	"Confesso"	Ana Carolina, Antônio Villeroy	3:28
3.	"Ela é Bamba"	Antônio Villeroy	3:05
4.	"Implicante"	Ana Carolina	3:10
5.	"Quem de Nós Dois" (La Mia Storia Tra Le Dita)	Gianluca Grignani, Massimo Luca – Adapted by Ana Carolina, Dudu Falcão	5:04
6.	"Pra Terminar"	Herbert Vianna	4:38
7.	"Que Será"	Marina Pinto, Mário Rossi	3:44
8.	"Joana"	Ana Carolina	3:18
9.	"Violão e Voz"	Ana Carolina	4:17
10.	"Vê Se Me Esqueçe"	Ana Carolina	4:33
11.	"A Câmera Que Filma os Dias"	Ana Carolina, Antônio Villeroy	3:22
12.	"Dadivosa"	Ana Carolina, Adriana Calcanhotto, Neusa Pinheiro	3:11
13.	"Que Se Danem Os Nós"	Ana Carolina, Antônio Villeroy	4:03
14.	"Eu Nunca Te Amei Idiota"	Ana Carolina, Seu Jorge	3:35
15.	"Me Sento Na Rua"	Ana Carolina, Vanessa da Mata	2:55

== Certifications ==
Country	Certification(s) (sales thresholds)
Brazil	Platinum
