= Dois Quartos =

Studio album by Ana Carolina
- Released: December 2006
- Recorded: Blue Studios
- Genre: MPB, alternative dance, pop, acoustic, bossa nova, samba
- Length: 93:11
- Language: Portuguese
- Label: Sony BMG
- Producer: Ana Carolina, Marilene Gondim, Guto Graça Mello, Nilo Romero, Marcelo Sussekind, Afo Verde

Ana Carolina chronology
Ana & Jorge: Ao Vivo (2005)	Dois Quartos (2006)	Multishow Ao Vivo: Dois Quartos (2008)

CDs covers from the album Dois Quartos
- Cover Quarto

Singles from Quarto
- 1. "É Isso Aí (The Blower's Daughter)"; 2. "Pra Rua Me Levar"; 3. "Aqui"

Alternative cover
- Cover Quartinho

Singles from Quartinho
- 1. "Carvão"

Dois Quartos (In English: "Two Rooms"), launched in 2006, had its revival in 2007, selling each disc separately, is the 4th studio album and 6th career album of Brazilian singer, songwriter, arranger, producer Ana Carolina.

== Reception ==
Professional ratings
Review scores
Source	Rating
Allmusic	3.5/5 stars
Billboard	(Positive)
Ziriguidum	(Positive)

Jason Birchmeier, wrote for the magazine Billboard site and allmusic, saying that the album brings in its 24 songs, a strong style and sentimentality in the instrumental music. He also says that "Dois Quartos" is a highlight of the expression of Ana Carolina, and this album, poses as the biggest superstar of the MPB. He still isse that the subject of bisexuality, lends an air of curiosity in some of the songs. Even more, why is labeled strictly for adults".

In Brazil, Joao Paulo de Oliveira Bueno, wrote that there is a maturity and confidence in the production of the album: "Ana is more mature. Not that she was not before. Now the singer can bring to the music, presenting his point of view and even her bisexuality in the songs 'Homem e Mulher', 'Eu Comi a Madona', 'Rosas' and 'Eu Não Paro'.

== Track list ==
=== 1° CD ===
Quarto
No.	Title	Music	Length
1.	"Nada te Faltará"	Ana Carolina e Antônio Villeroy	4:37
2.	"Tolerância"	Ana Carolina e Antônio Villeroy	3:47
3.	"Ruas de Outono"	Ana Carolina e Antônio Villeroy	3:58
4.	"Aqui"	Ana Carolina e Antônio Villeroy	4:18
5.	"Rosas"	Antônio Villeroy	3:35
6.	"Um Edifício no Meio do Mundo"	Ana Carolina e Jorge Vercilo	3:22
7.	"Vai"	Simone Saback	4:36
8.	"O Cristo de Madeira"	Ana Carolina	3:07
9.	"Eu Comi a Madona"	Ana Carolina, Mano Mello, Antônio Villeroy e Alvin L.	2:17
10.	"1.100,00 (Nega Marrenta)"	Ana Carolina e Aleh	2:57
11.	"Chevette"	Ana Carolina	2:02
12.	"Notícias Populares"	Ana Carolina	3:09
Total length:			41:52

=== 2° CD ===
Quartinho
No.	Title	Music	Length
1.	"La Critique (Instrumental)"	Ana Carolina, Antônio Villeroy, Dunga e Nilo Romero	5:21
2.	"Então Vá Se Perder"	Ana Carolina	5:42
3.	"Carvão"	Ana Carolina	3:26
4.	"Manhã"	Ana Carolina, Bebeto Alves, Aleh e Antônio Villeroy	5:14
5.	"Homens e Mulheres"	Ana Carolina	4:45
6.	"Corredores"	Ana Carolina	4:59
7.	"Sen.Ti.Mentos (Instrumental)"	Ana Carolina	4:46
8.	"Cantinho"	Ana Carolina e Gastão Villeroy	2:16
9.	"Eu Não Paro"	Ana Carolina, Dudu Falcão e Lula Queiroga	4:29
10.	"Claridade"	Ana Carolina e Aleh	4:44
11.	"Milhares de Sambas"	Ana Carolina	1:59
12.	"Eu comi a Madona" (Remix DJ Zé Pedro)	Ana Carolina, Mano Mello, Antônio Villeroy e Alvin L.	3:36
Total length:			51:19

==== Singles ====
- Rosas – It was the first single taken from "Room". Ranked first of all radios in this segment in Brazil.
- Carvão
- Ruas de outono
- Aqui
- Vai (Simone Saback)

== Charts ==
=== Year-end charts ===
Chart (2006)	Peak position
Brazilian Albums (Pro-Música Brasil)	16

Chart (2007)	Peak position
Brazilian Albums (Pro-Música Brasil)	14

== Certifications ==
Country	Certification(s) (sales thresholds)	Sales
Brazil Brazil	3× Platinum	300,000+
