= Raça Negra =

Brazilian pagode band

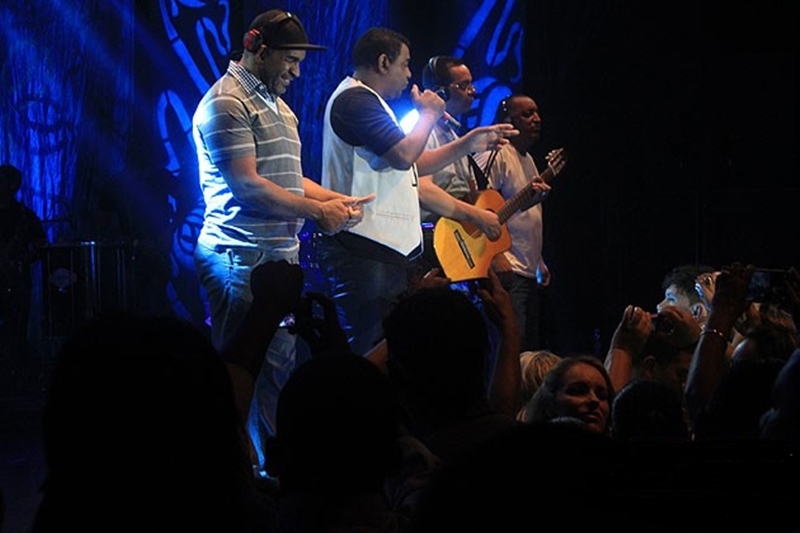
- Raça Negra performs in Taguatinga, 2014

Background information
- Origin: São Caetano do Sul, São Paulo, Brazil
- Genre: Pagode
- Years active: 1983–present
- Label: RGE
- Members: Luiz Carlos - vocals, guitar; Paulinho - bass; Fernando Monstrinho; Fininho (João Roberto); Fena - percussion; Edson Café (died 2025)
- Past members: Gabú (1991–1997) - percussion

Raça Negra (Brazilian Portuguese: [ˈʁasɐ ˈneɡɾɐ]); Portuguese for "Black Race", is a Brazilian pagode group from São Caetano do Sul, São Paulo.

The ensemble formed in 1983, but did not release their first album until 1991, after a demo tape got them signed to RGE. The album spawned numerous hits in Brazil, and over the next decade the group went on to sell millions of albums. They have made many appearances on Brazilian television. Among their hits are "Caroline", "Quero Ver Você Chorar," "Somente Você," "Chega", "Cigana," "Quando Te Encontrei," "Cheia de Manias," "Doce Paixão," and "Me Leva Junto com Você".

The group's music is perhaps best known to the English-speaking world as a result of a slipup at a Brazilian CD pressing plant in 1999. Several hundred copies of AOL CD-ROMs were accidentally pressed with a Raça Negra album instead of the company software.

It is noticeable that the ensemble does not present a cavaquinho or banjo, traditional instruments featuring songs in the genre of pagode.

== Members ==
Current members

- Luiz Carlos - vocals, guitar
- Paulinho - bass
- Fernando Monstrinho
- Fininho (João Roberto)
- Fena - percussion
- Edson Café (died in 2025)

Former members

Gabú (1991–1997) - percussion

== Discography ==
- Raça Negra 25 Anos (2016)
- Raça Negra Vol. 10 (2001)
- Raça Negra Ao Vivo - Vol. 2 (2000) (live)
- Raça Negra Ao Vivo - Vol. 1 (2000) (live)
- Vem pra ficar (2000)
- Raça Negra Ao Vivo 2 (1999)
- Raça Negra Vol. 9 (1998)
- Raça Negra Vol. 8 (1997)
- Raça Negra Vol. 7 (1996)
- Raça Negra Ao Vivo (1996)
- Raça Negra Vol. 6 (1995)
- Raça Negra Vol. 5 (1994)
- Raça Negra Vol. 4 (1993)
- Raça Negra Vol. 3 (1993)
- Raça Negra Vol. 2 (1992)
- Raça Negra Vol. 1 (1991)
