= Belafonte Sensacional =

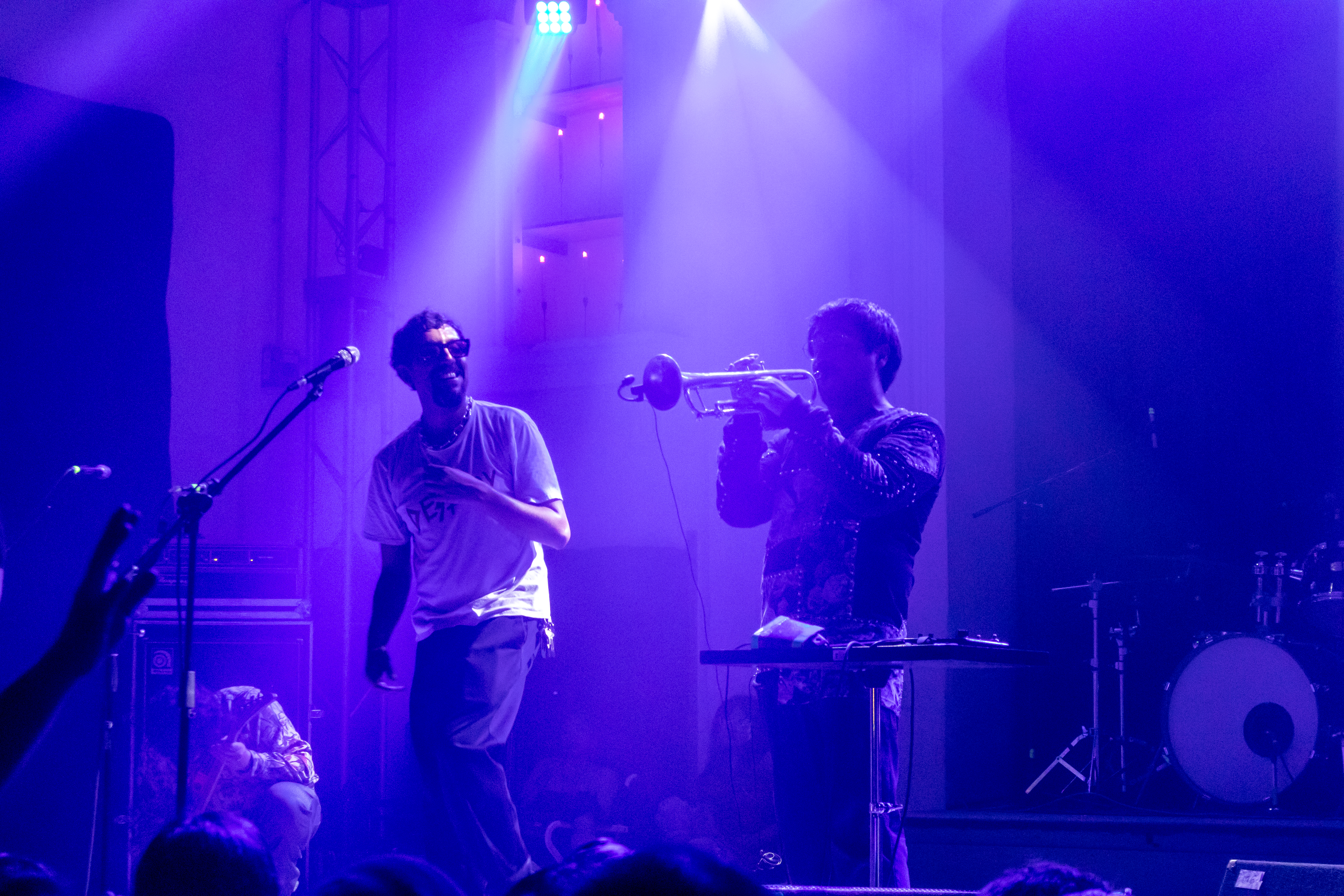
- Belafonte Sensacional in 2026

Background information
- Origin: Mexico City, Mexico
- Genres: Folk rock, punk rock
- Years active: 2009–present
- Members: Israel Ramírez; Emilio Guerrero; Alejandro Guerrero; Emmanuel García; Enrique Álvarez; Pablo Mendía; Carlos Bergen Dyck; Apache O'Raspi

Epic Aris
"Epic Aris" of Soy piedra álbum (2019)

Belafonte Sensacional is a Mexican rock and folk rock band based in Mexico City led by musician and composer Israel Ramírez.

== History ==
Belafonte Sensacional was the stage name that in 2009 Israel Ramírez —a musician from Iztapalapa, Mexico City began to use to interpret his songs until the project became a band. The name "Belafonte Sensacional" was taken from Wes Anderson's The Life Aquatic with Steve Zissou, although Ramirez has mentioned that it also refers to Mexican pulp magazines called "sensational" such as "Sensacional de Traileros", "Sensacional de barrios" and others.

The critic has called Belafonte Sensacional's style as Mexican folk. Among the stylistic influences that Belafonte Sensational has cited are Bob Dylan, Bright Eyes, Woody Guthrie, Johnny Cash also musicians of the Movimiento rupestre like Rockdrigo González and Jaime López; In his songs, the band frequently reference both Mexico City jargon and places.

== Members ==
- Israel Ramírez, acoustic guitar, dobro and lead vocals
- Apache O'Raspi, electric bass
- Emilio Guerrero, drums
- Alejandro Guerrero (ElAle), harmonica and backing vocals
- Emmanuel García (Choby), trumpet
- Enrique Álvarez (El Gober), backing vocals
- Carlos Bergen Dyck (Perritos Genéricos), guitar
- Pablo Mendía, keyboards
- Andrea Grain Hayton, visuals and multimedia.

== Discography ==
- 2025 - LLAMAS LLAMAS LLAMAS
- 2018: Soy piedra.
- 2017: Destroy.
- 2014: Gazapo.
- 2010: Petit riot

=== EP ===
- 2023: En vivo desde el Salón Los Ángeles

=== Others ===
- 2014: "Verte regresar" with Paulina Lasa, in Verte regresar, compilado de canciones por Ayotzinapa, a collective album recorded to support 2014 Iguala mass kidnapping victims

== External sources ==
- Website of the band
