= Ricky Vallen =

Brazilian singer (born 1978)

- Also known as: Ricky Vallen
- Born: March 14, 1978 (age 48)
- Origin: Volta Redonda-RJ, Brazil
- Occupation: Singer
- Years active: 1987–present
- Label: Sony Music
- Website: RickyVallen

Ricky Vallen is a Brazilian singer.

== Discography ==
- (2007) Homenagens
- (2009) Ao Vivo (also released on DVD)
