= The Life Aquatic with Steve Zissou =

2004 film by Wes Anderson

- Theatrical release poster
- Directed by: Wes Anderson
- Written by: Wes Anderson; Noah Baumbach
- Produced by: Wes Anderson; Barry Mendel; Scott Rudin
- Starring: Bill Murray; Owen Wilson; Cate Blanchett; Anjelica Huston; Willem Dafoe; Jeff Goldblum; Michael Gambon; Bud Cort
- Cinematography: Robert Yeoman
- Edited by: David Moritz
- Music by: Mark Mothersbaugh
- Production companies: Touchstone Pictures; American Empirical Pictures
- Distributed by: Buena Vista Pictures Distribution
- Release dates: November 20, 2004 (Los Angeles); December 25, 2004 (United States)
- Running time: 119 minutes
- Country: United States
- Language: English
- Budget: $50 million
- Box office: $34.8 million

The Life Aquatic with Steve Zissou is a 2004 American adventure comedy-drama film written by Wes Anderson and Noah Baumbach and directed by Anderson. It is Anderson's fourth feature-length film and was released in the United States on December 25, 2004.

The film stars Bill Murray as Steve Zissou, an eccentric oceanographer who sets out with his crew to exact revenge on the "jaguar shark" that ate his partner Esteban. Zissou is both a parody of and homage to French diving pioneer Jacques Cousteau, to whom the film is dedicated.

The film also features Owen Wilson, Cate Blanchett, Willem Dafoe, Michael Gambon, Jeff Goldblum, Anjelica Huston, and Bud Cort. Seu Jorge has a minor part, but contributes heavily to the film's soundtrack. It was filmed in and around Rome, Naples, Ponza, and the Italian Riviera.

The film was released to mixed reviews and was a box office flop. In the decade following its release it garnered a cult following, and is now viewed more positively by both critics and fans.

== Plot ==
While oceanographer Steve Zissou is working on his latest documentary at sea, his best friend and chief diver, Esteban du Plantier, is devoured by a 10-meter-long, spotted creature Zissou describes as a "jaguar shark". For his next project, Zissou is determined to document the shark's destruction.

The crew aboard Zissou's aging research vessel Belafonte includes his estranged wife Eleanor, chief strategist and financial backer; Pelé dos Santos, a safety expert and Brazilian guitarist who sings David Bowie songs in Portuguese; and Klaus Daimler, the German first mate who views Zissou and Esteban as father figures. Other crew members include Vikram Ray, cameraman; Bobby Ogata, frogman; Vladimir Wolodarsky, physicist and soundtrack composer; Renzo Pietro, sound man; and Anne-Marie Sakowitz, a script girl. Also included is a recent group of unpaid interns from the University of North Alaska. However, the "Team Zissou" venture has hit a decline, having not released a successful documentary in nine years.

Ned Plimpton, a longtime Zissou fan whose mother has recently died, believes that Zissou is his father. After they meet at Zissou's latest premiere, Ned takes annual leave from his job as an airline pilot in Kentucky to join his crew. As Oseary Drakoulias, Zissou's producer, cannot find a financier for their latest documentary, Ned offers his inheritance. Eleanor feels her husband is manipulating Ned and leaves.

Pregnant reporter Jane Winslett-Richardson comes to chronicle the voyage. Both Ned and Zissou are attracted to Jane and a love triangle develops between them. Klaus becomes jealous of the attention Zissou pays to Ned.

On their mission to find the jaguar shark, the Belafonte steals tracking equipment from a remote station owned by more successful oceanographer (also Eleanor's ex-husband and Zissou's nemesis) Alistair Hennessey. They then sail into unprotected waters and are attacked by Filipino pirates, who steal Ned's money and kidnap Bill Ubell, "a bond company stooge" assigned to the project. They are then rescued by Hennessey and towed to Port-au-Patois. (Note: A fictional town filmed on Ponza.) Sakowitz, along with all but one of the interns, jumps ship once they reach port.

Zissou persuades Eleanor to rejoin the Belafonte and then leads the crew on a rescue mission. They track Bill to an abandoned hotel on a remote island, saving him along with Hennessey, whom the pirates have also kidnapped. Ned and Zissou make one last search for the shark in the ship's helicopter, but the aircraft malfunctions and they crash. Ned dies from his injuries and is buried at sea. Prior to Ned's death, Eleanor revealed to Jane that Zissou is sterile and therefore Ned could not have been his son.

Zissou finally tracks down the shark in a submersible but decides not to kill it, both because of its beauty and being out of dynamite. He ponders, "I wonder if it remembers me," and is overcome with emotion. Eleanor silently comforts him, as does Jane and the rest of the crew. At the premiere of the finished documentary (which is dedicated to Ned, who is acknowledged as Zissou's son), Zissou receives a standing ovation while waiting outside the theater for the premiere to finish. The crew returns triumphantly to the ship.

== Cast ==
- Bill Murray as Steve Zissou
- Owen Wilson as Edward 'Ned' Plimpton / Kingsley Zissou
- Cate Blanchett as Jane Winslett-Richardson
- Anjelica Huston as Eleanor Zissou
- Willem Dafoe as Klaus Daimler
- Jeff Goldblum as Alistair Hennessey
- Michael Gambon as Oseary Drakoulias
- Noah Taylor as Vladimir Wolodarsky
- Bud Cort as Bill Ubell, Bond Company Stooge
- Seu Jorge as Pelé dos Santos
- Robyn Cohen as Anne-Marie Sakowitz
- Waris Ahluwalia as Vikram Ray
- Niels Koizumi as Bobby Ogata
- Pawel Wdowczak as Renzo Pietro
- Matthew Gray Gubler as Niko The Intern (credited as Intern #1)
- Seymour Cassel as Esteban du Plantier
- Antonio Monda as Himself
- Isabella Blow as Antonia Cook

== Production ==
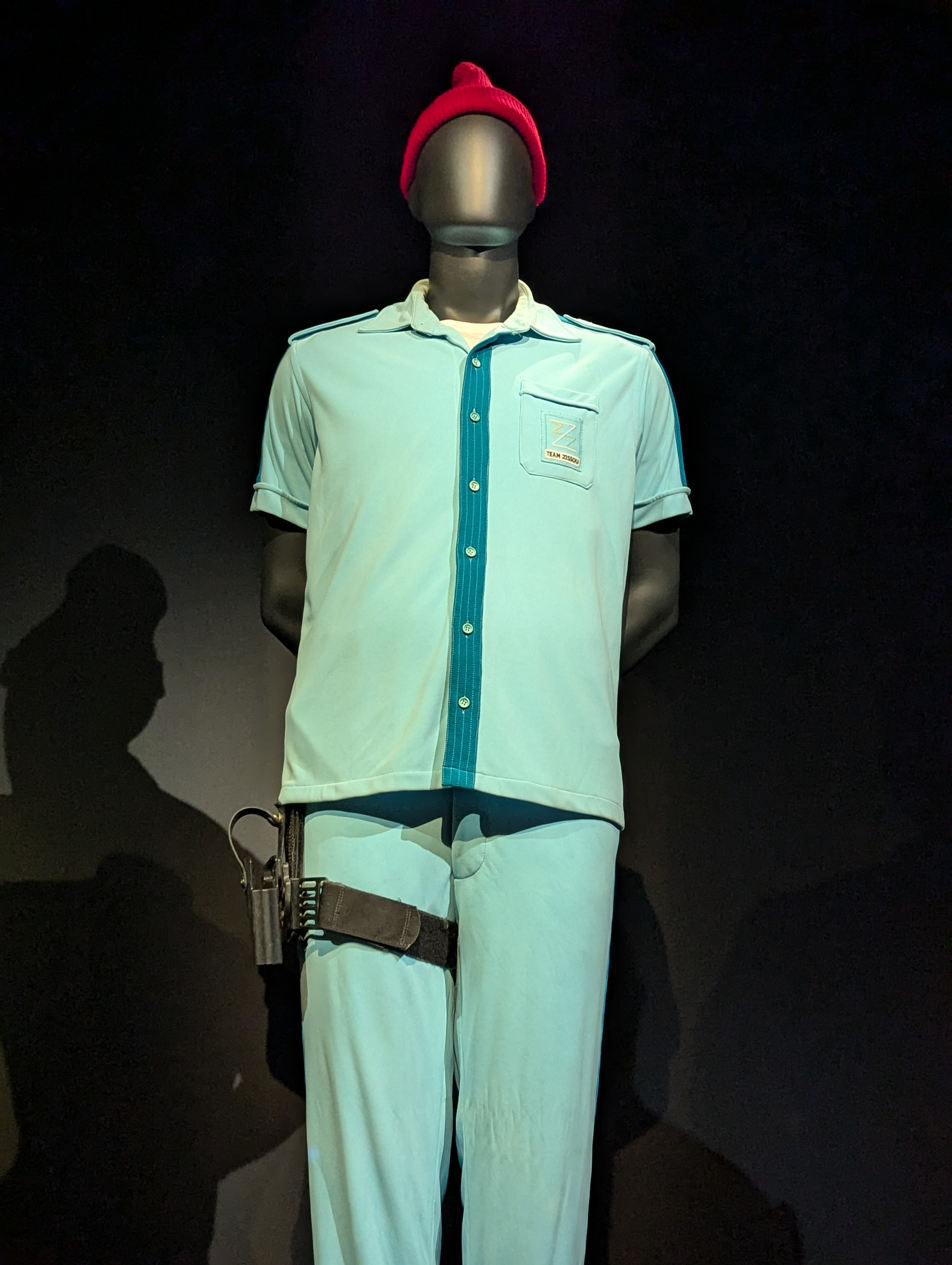
Costume worn by Steve Zissou (Bill Murray) at the Academy Museum in Los Angeles, California.

=== Literary inspiration ===
Though the characters were inspired by such American novels as The Great Gatsby and The Magnificent Ambersons, the plot has been compared to Moby-Dick.

Writing about the metaphorical aspects of the film's setting—somewhere in the Mediterranean—film critic Elena Past says that the underwater scenes, because they are central to the storyline, make The Life Aquatic similar in some ways to Respiro. Both films set out a "Mediterranean state of being" where "having left the security of land, the characters in both films are suddenly confronted with the precarious nature of human existence, as the films that depict them tackle the challenges of representing the submarine world."

=== Casting ===
James Gray originally signed on to play Wolodarsky but he left when he learned that he was going to spend five months in Italy.

=== Exotic lifeforms ===
In addition to the luminescent-spotted jaguar shark, other fictional lifeforms (some stop-motion-animated) are cited and appear throughout the film, such as the rhinestone bluefin, crayon ponyfish, wild snow-mongoose, electric jellyfish, and sugar crabs. The animation work was done by Henry Selick.

=== Music ===
The soundtrack to The Life Aquatic with Steve Zissou contains a style typical of other Wes Anderson films. Mark Mothersbaugh, a member of Devo, composed the score, as he has for many of Anderson's other films. The film also features many rock songs from the 1960s-1980s, and several instrumental pieces composed by Sven Libaek for the underwater documentary television series Inner Space. Additionally, the film and soundtrack feature Seu Jorge performing David Bowie songs in Portuguese on the acoustic guitar. Jorge, who also plays the character of Pelé dos Santos, performs some of these cover songs live, in character during the film, mostly with modified lyrics reflecting Jorge's own experiences working on the film. The ending scene depicting the beauty of the shark features the song "Starálfur" by Sigur Rós.

The Life Aquatic is Anderson's first film not to feature a Rolling Stones song.

== Reception ==
=== Box office ===
The film grossed a total of $24,020,403 domestically after twelve weeks in release, less than half its $50 million production budget. It took in a further $10,788,000 internationally, bringing the total gross to $34,808,403.

=== Critical response ===
Initial reviews of the film were mixed. The film has a 57% approval rating on Rotten Tomatoes, based on 226 reviews, with an average rating of 6.10/10; the website's consensus states: "Much like the titular oceanographer, The Life Aquatic with Steve Zissou's overt irony may come off as smug and artificial – but for fans of Wes Anderson's unique brand of whimsy, it might be worth the dive." The film has a 62/100 weighted average score on Metacritic, indicating "generally favorable reviews". Audiences polled by CinemaScore gave the film an average grade of "D" on an A+ to F scale.

Anthony Lane, a film reviewer for The New Yorker, agreed with the conventional criticism of Anderson's deadpan style: that the underreaction of Anderson's characters used to be "hip" but has now become "frozen into a mannerism." He said that "some stretches of action" in the film are being "lightly held within quotation marks," with an "unmistakable air of playacting" in even the most violent scenes. He also criticized the film's deliberately "weird" set ups, which leave the viewer with "the impression of having nearly drowned in some secret and melancholy game."

In the years since its initial release it has developed a cult following, and it underwent a critical reevaluation. Many critics view it more favorably, and some, such as Mike D'Angelo of The A.V. Club, consider the film to still be "undervalued" when compared to the rest of Anderson's filmography.

In 2025, it was one of the films voted for the "Readers' Choice" edition of The New York Times' list of "The 100 Best Movies of the 21st Century," finishing at number 226.

=== Accolades ===
Award	Category	Recipient(s)	Result
Art Directors Guild	Art Directors Guild Award for Excellence in Production Design for a Contemporary Film	Mark Friedberg, Stefano Maria Ortolani, Eugenio Ulissi, Marco Trentini, Simona Migliotti, Giacomo Calò Carducci, Saverio Sammali, Nazzareno Piana, Maria-Teresa Barbasso, Giulia Chiara Crugnola	Nominated
Berlin International Film Festival	Golden Berlin Bear	Wes Anderson	Nominated
Boston Society of Film Critics Awards	Best Cast	Cate Blanchett, Willem Dafoe, Jeff Goldblum, Owen Wilson, Bud Cort, Anjelica Huston, Michael Gambon, Bill Murray, Noah Taylor	Nominated
Broadcast Film Critics Association Awards	Best Acting Ensemble	Cate Blanchett, Willem Dafoe, Jeff Goldblum, Owen Wilson, Bud Cort, Anjelica Huston, Michael Gambon, Bill Murray, Noah Taylor	Nominated
Central Ohio Film Critics Association Awards	Actor of the Year	Cate Blanchett	Won
Costume Designers Guild Awards	Excellence in Contemporary Film	Milena Canonero	Won
Golden Trailer Awards	Best Comedy	The Life Aquatic with Steve Zissou	Nominated
Las Vegas Film Critics Society Awards	Best Supporting Actress	Cate Blanchett	Won
Motion Picture Sound Editors, USA	Best Sound Editing in a Feature	Richard Henderson	Nominated
Motion Picture Sound Editors, USA	Best Music - Feature	The Life Aquatic with Steve Zissou	Nominated
Golden Satellite Awards	Best Actor - Motion Picture, Musical or Comedy	Bill Murray	Nominated
Golden Satellite Awards	Best Motion Picture, Musical or Comedy	The Life Aquatic with Steve Zissou	Nominated
Golden Satellite Awards	Best Original Screenplay	Wes Anderson and Noah Baumbach	Nominated

== Home media ==
The DVD of the film was released by the Criterion Collection on May 10, 2005 as its 300th title, in both 1-disc version and a 2-disc versions. This is Anderson's third film to be released in the collection, after Rushmore and The Royal Tenenbaums. The Criterion Blu-ray was released on May 27, 2014. It was released on Ultra HD Blu-ray by Criterion on September 30, 2025, as part of the ten film collection The Wes Anderson Archive: Ten Films, Twenty-Five Years.

== In popular culture ==
- The name of Mexican rock band Belafonte Sensacional is inspired, in part, by the film.
- Epic Rap Battles of History released a rap battle between Jacques Cousteau and Steve Irwin. In one of Cousteau's flex bars, he references The Life Aquatic saying, "I'm so cool, Bill Murray played me in the movie."
- The title of an episode of the animated sitcom Family Guy, "The Tan Aquatic with Steve Zissou", is a reference to the film.
- The song "Alan Forever" on Lupe Fiasco's album DROGAS WAVE imagines an alternate reality for Alan Kurdi, in which he survived his emigration from Syria and "might be the next Steve Zissou or maybe Jacques Cousteau."
- The ocean-themed 13th major update released for the video game Minecraft was titled "Update Aquatic" in reference to the film.
- The song "Zissou" by Hayley Williams (solo artist and frontwoman of the band Paramore) is named in reference to the movie and also mentions "Team Zissou" in the first verse.
- Rapper Logic used the poster as inspiration for the cover art to his sophomore album, The Incredible True Story.

== See also ==
- SAS Walvisbaai, the ship used as the R/V Belafonte.
- Jaguar catshark, a species of shark named after the fictional shark featured in the film.
