= Ana Carolina (album) =

Studio album by Ana Carolina
- Released: November 2, 1999
- Recorded: 1999
- Genres: MPB, alternative dance
- Length: 53:56
- Label: BMG Brazil
- Producers: Luciana David, Nilo Romero, Claudio Menezes

Ana Carolina chronology
Ana Carolina (1999)	Ana Rita Joana Iracema e Carolina (2001)

Singles from Ana Carolina
- 1. "Tô Saindo" Released: 1999; 2. "Nada Pra Mim" Released: 1999; 3. "Garganta" Released: 1999

Professional ratings
Review scores
Source	Rating
Clique Music	2.5/5 stars

Ana Carolina is the debut album by Brazilian singer-songwriter, arranger and record producer Ana Carolina.

In addition to the artist's own compositions and her musical partners, such as Totonho Villeroy, Paulinho Moska and Alvin L., this album contains remakes of songs by renowned artists such as Chico Buarque, Lulu Santos e Pato Fu. It sold 125 000 copies in Brazil, being certified platinum.

== Track listing ==
No.	Title	Music	Length
1.	"Tô Saindo"	Antônio Villeroy	3:09
2.	"Algúem me Disse"	Evaldo Gouveia, Jair Amorim	3:39
3.	"Nada Pra Mim"	John	3:39
4.	"Trancado"	Ana Carolina	3:43
5.	"Armazém"	Ana Carolina	2:28
6.	"Garganta"	Antônio Villeroy	3:36
7.	"A Canção Tocou na Hora Errada"	Ana Carolina	4:15
8.	"Tudo Bem"	Lulu Santos	3:06
9.	"Agora ou Nunca"	Arnaldo Antunes, Marcelo Fromer, Sérgio Britto	4:12
10.	"O Melhor de Mim"	Frejat, Paulinho Moska, Dulce Quental	3:54
11.	"Retrato Branco e Preto"	Chico Buarque, Tom Jobim	3:25
12.	"Perder Tempo Com Você"	Alvin L.	3:26
13.	"O Avesso dos Ponteiros"	Ana Carolina	3:50
14.	"Beatriz"	Chico Buarque, Edu Lobo	3:48
15.	"Tô Caindo Fora"	Ana Carolina, Marilda Ladeira, Fernando Barreto	3:45
Total length:			53:56

== Personnel ==
- Sacha Amback – arranger, keyboards, program, choir arrangement
- Guto Antunes – photo assistance
- Fabio Arruda – graphic design
- Aldivas Ayres – trombone
- Bernardo Bessler – violin
- Ana Carolina – guitar, arranger, vocals, pandeiro, concept
- Lui Coimbra – cello
- Walter Costa – loop, sound technician
- Jorge Davidson – art direction
- Dunga – bass
- Nelson Faria – guitar
- Vitor Farias – digital editing, mixing
- Emil Ferreira – graphic coordinator
- Ricardo Garcia – mastering
- Milton Guedes – alto sax, vocals
- Fábio Henriques – mixing
- Jovi – tamborim
- Jurema – vocals
- Jussara – vocals
- Paulo Lima – technical assistance
- Marco Lobo – percussion
- Alexandre Lucas – vocals
- Macaé – tenor sax
- William Magalhaes – keyboards, program
- Arthur Maia – bass
- Theo Marés – studio assistant
- Marcelo Martins – tenor sax
- Mauro Rufino Martins – violin
- Cláudio Menezes – production assistant
- Paulinho Moska – guitar
- Marcelo Neves – arranger
- Paschoal Perrota – arranger
- Hugo Vargas Pilger – cello
- Nilo Romero – arranger, producer, digital editing, loop, sound technician
- Eduardo Souto Neto – choir arrangement
- Marcos Suzano – percussion, pandeiro, tamborim
- Greg VanDerlans – photography
- Totonho Villeroy – arranger
- Mac William – drums

== Certifications ==
Country	Certification(s) (sales thresholds)
Brazil	Platinum
