= Moro no Brasil =

2002 documentary film directed by Mika Kaurismäki

- Directed by: Mika Kaurismäki
- Screenplay by: Mika Kaurismäki
- Produced by: Magnatel TV GmbH
- Cinematography: Jacques Cheuiche
- Edited by: Karen Harley
- Release date: 2002
- Running time: 105 minutes
- Countries: Brazil; Finland; Germany

Moro no Brasil is a 2002 documentary film directed by the Finnish filmmaker Mika Kaurismäki.

== Synopsis ==
A musical voyage into the heart of the largest country in Latin America, a legacy of the successive inhabitants of Brazil: Indians, Europeans, Africans... All these cultural influences have piled up in the same way that geological stratifications do, offering a variety of rhythms: Forró, Frevo, Embolada, Samba... To make this documentary, the Finnish director Mika Kaurismäki has traveled 4,000 kilometers, crossed three states in the Northwest of Brazil, and spoken to more than thirty musicians, most of them street musicians and unknown to foreigners.

== Awards ==
- Nyon Visions du Réel, Switzerland 2007
