= Ana Carolina =

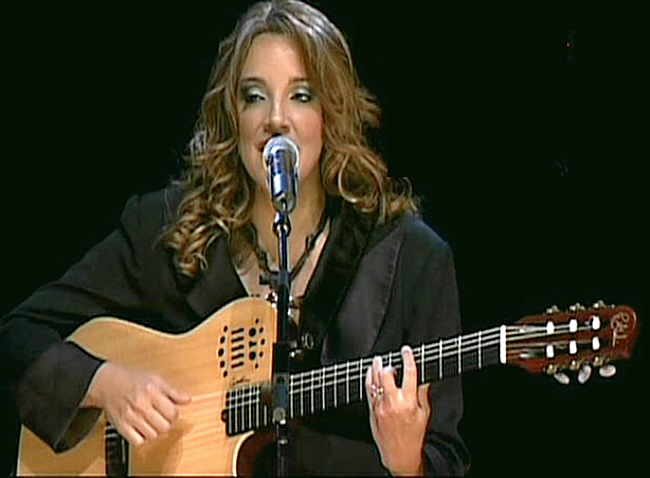
- Ana Carolina in 2009, on the Dois Quartos tour
- Born: Ana Carolina Sousa; September 9, 1974 (age 52); Juiz de Fora, Minas Gerais, Brazil
- Occupations: Singer; songwriter; instrumentalist
- Years active: 1999–present
- Musical career
- Genres: MPB; pop; samba; rock
- Instruments: Vocals; guitar; bass guitar; pandeiro; piano
- Label: Sony BMG
- Website: ana-carolina.com

Ana Carolina Sousa (Portuguese pronunciation: [ˈɐ̃nɐ karoˈlinɐ], born September 9, 1974) is a Brazilian pop rock singer, songwriter and musician.

== Career ==
Carolina has a contralto vocal range. Her musical influence comes from the crib, her grandmother used to sing on the radio, and her great-aunt and uncle played percussion, piano, cello, and violin. She grew up listening to Brazilian musical icons such as Chico Buarque, João Bosco, Maria Bethânia as well as international icons such as Nina Simone, Björk, and Alanis Morissette. She began her career singing in local bars.

With the determination to become a successful professional musician, she left Minas Gerais and moved to Rio de Janeiro. Shortly after moving to Rio de Janeiro, she signed a contract with the BMG recording company. She released her first CD, Ana Carolina, in 1999, which was responsible for her nomination in the Latin Grammy Awards.

Her second album, Ana Rita Joana Iracema e Carolina was another success, released in 2001. The album's title is in reference to songs by the singer Chico Buarque, one of Ana Carolina's idols. This album contained hits like "Quem de nós dois" and "Ela é bamba".

In 2003, she released her third album, Estampado which showed her musical originality. Her 4th CD, Ana Carolina: Perfil released in 2004, was a collection of her most successful songs from her first 3 CDs and, according to ABPD, is the best-selling in Brazil in 2005. Also in 2004 she performed a show with Seu Jorge and released a live CD and DVD of the show called Ana & Jorge. The song, "É Isso Aí", a Portuguese version of Damien Rice's "The Blower's Daughter", reached the #1 spot on the charts.

Carolina came out in Veja magazine as bisexual in 2005, creating much debate and attracting new fans. She released her 6th album, Dois Quartos, in 2006. The album contained 2 CDs, the 1st called 'Quarto' and the 2nd called 'Quartinho'.

In December 2017, Alice Caymmi released a song and an accompanying video called "Inocente" that was co-written by Carolina.

== Discography ==
=== Studio albums ===
Year	Album	Formats	Sales
1999	Ana Carolina	CD	250,000
2001	Ana Rita Joana Iracema e Carolina	CD	350,000
2003	Estampado	CD	600,000
2006	Dois Quartos	CD	200,000
2009	N9ve	CD	100,000
2013	#AC	CD	75,000
2019	Fogueira em Alto Mar	Streaming	Digital download
2025	Ainda Já	Streaming	Digital download

=== Compilation albums ===
Year	Album	Formats	Sales
2005	Perfil: Ana Carolina	CD	700,000
2010	Perfil: Ana Carolina - Vol. 2	CD	100,000
2012	Mega Hits: Ana Carolina	CD	200,000

=== Live/video albums ===
Year	Album	Format	Sales
2003	Estampado (documentary)	DVD	50,000
2004	Estampado - Um instante que não pára	DVD	100,000
2005	Ana & Jorge (with Seu Jorge)	CD, DVD	500,000 (CD), 100,000 (DVD)
2008	Multishow ao Vivo: Ana Carolina - Dois Quartos	CD, DVD	250,000 (CD), 200,000 (DVD)
2009	Multishow Registro: Ana Car9lina + Um	CD, DVD, blu-ray	100,000 (CD/DVD)
2012	Ensaio de Cores	CD, DVD, LP	100,000 (CD), 60,000 (DVD)
2015	#AC ao Vivo	CD, DVD	20,000 (CD), 40,000 (DVD)
2025	Ana Canta Cássia	Streaming	Digital download

=== Singles ===
Ano	Single	Charts		Album
Ano	Single	BRA Hot 100	BRA Year End	Album
1999	"Tô Saindo"	26	97	Ana Carolina
1999	"Nada Pra Mim"	19	50	Ana Carolina
2000	"Garganta"	1	5	Ana Carolina
2000	"Beatriz"	58	—	Ana Carolina
2001	"Ela é Bamba"	6	30	Ana Rita Joana; Iracema e Carolina
2001	"Confesso"	22	91	Ana Rita Joana; Iracema e Carolina
2002	"Quem de Nós Dois (La Mia Storia Tra le Dita)"	1	2	Ana Rita Joana; Iracema e Carolina
2003	"Encostar na Tua"	1	10	Estampado
2003	"Elevador"	1	3	Estampado
2004	"Uma Louca Tempestade"	4	9	Estampado
2004	"Nua"	42	—	Estampado
2005	"Pra Rua me Levar"	29	—	Estampado
2005	"Que Se Danem os Nós"	25	—	Perfil: Ana Carolina
2006	"É Isso Aí (The Blower's Daughter)" (feat. Seu Jorge)	1	6	Ana & Jorge
2006	"Pra Rua me Levar" (2nd Version) (feat. Seu Jorge)	15	—	Ana & Jorge
2006	"Rosas"	1	9	Dois Quartos
2007	"Carvão"	7	69	Dois Quartos
2007	"Ruas de Outono"	11	—	Dois Quartos
2007	"Aqui"	36	—	Dois Quartos
2007	"Vai" (Simone Saback cover)	21	—	Multishow ao Vivo: Ana; Carolina - Dois Quartos
2008	"Tolerância"	39	—	Multishow ao Vivo: Ana; Carolina - Dois Quartos
2008	"Eu Comi a Madona"	28	—	Dois Quartos
2009	"Tá rindo, é?"	11	—	N9ve
2009	"Entreolhares (The Way You're Looking at Me)" (feat. John Legend)	11	—	N9ve
2010	"10 Minutos"	33	—	N9ve
2011	"Problemas"	15	—	Ensaio de Cores
2012	"Simplesmente Aconteceu"	25	—	Ensaio de Cores
2012	"Un Sueño Bajo El Agua" (feat. Chiara Civello)	—	—	#AC
2013	"Combustível"	46	—	#AC
2014	"Libido"	—	—	#AC
2015	"Coração Selvagem"	—	—	#AC ao Vivo
2015	"Descomplicar"	—	—	—N/a
2015	"Quer Saber?"	—	—	—N/a
2016	"Mais uma Vez (Nós Dois)" (with Seu Jorge)	—	—	—N/a
2017	"A Pele"	—	—	Som (Ruído Branco)
2017	"Qual É?"	—	—	Som (Ruído Branco)
2017	"Velho Piano"	—	—	Som (Ruído Branco)
2019	"Não Tem no Mapa"	63	—	Fogueira em Alto Mar
