= Seu Jorge =

Brazilian musician and actor (born 1970)

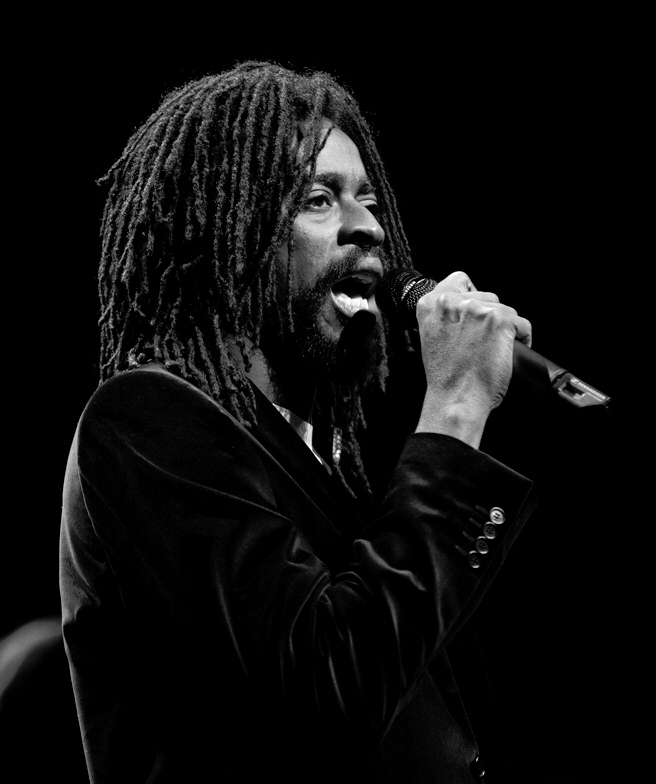

Background information
- Born: Jorge Mário da Silva; June 8, 1970 (age 56)
- Origin: Belford Roxo, Rio de Janeiro, Brazil
- Genres: MPB; samba; soul; funk rock
- Occupations: Musician, singer, songwriter, actor
- Website: seujorge.com

Jorge Mário da Silva (born June 8, 1970), known as Seu Jorge (Seu, colloquial Brazilian Portuguese for "Mister" or "Sir"; Portuguese pronunciation: [ˈsew ˈʒɔʁʒi]), is a Brazilian musician, singer, songwriter, and actor.

He is considered by many to be a renewer of Brazilian pop samba. Seu Jorge cites samba schools and American soul singer Stevie Wonder as major musical influences.

Seu Jorge is also known for his film roles as Mané Galinha in City of God (2002), as Pelé dos Santos in The Life Aquatic with Steve Zissou (2004) and as a cowboy in Asteroid City (2023). His musical work has received praise from many fellow musicians, including David Bowie, Beck and Jarvis Cocker.

== Biography ==
The first-born of four children (the others being Charles, Vitório and Rogério), Seu Jorge had a tough childhood in the neighborhood of Gogó da Ema, in Belford Roxo. He started working in a tire shop when he was only 10 years old, the first of various jobs such as courier, joiner, and potato peeler in a bar. Seu Jorge served in the Brazilian Army from 1989 to 1990 in Rio de Janeiro, but did not adapt to the military lifestyle and ended up being expelled, in January of 1990.

The various professions never hindered Seu Jorge's dream of becoming a musician. Since his adolescence, he would frequent samba circles and funk parties with his dad and brothers, and early on started to perform singing at such events. It was there that, in 1990, the murder of his brother Vitório tore his family apart, and Seu Jorge ended up being homeless for around three years. The turnaround happened when Gabriel Moura, nephew of clarinetist Paulo Moura, invited him to participate in a spectacle called The flour saga (known in Portuguese as A saga da farinha), in which Gabriel was the musical director. He ended up participating in more than 20 shows with the Companhia de Teatro TUERJ, as singer and actor. Since he had no place to sleep, Seu Jorge slept in the theater, between 1993 and 1997 – the year where he joined the band Farofa Carioca.

He is cousins with Brazilian singer Dudu Nobre, and is of Cape Verdean descent. According to a DNA test, Seu Jorge is 85.1% African, 12.9% European and 2% Amerindian. He belongs to haplogroup R1b, suggesting that his paternal lineage probably derives from Western Europe.

== Career ==
Seu Jorge has gained exposure through his work as an actor and soundtrack composer. He appeared in the critically acclaimed 2002 film City of God as Mané Galinha, directed by filmmakers Fernando Meirelles and Katia Lund, and then played Pelé dos Santos in Wes Anderson's The Life Aquatic with Steve Zissou, for which he provided much of the soundtrack in the form of Portuguese language cover versions of David Bowie classics.

In June 2006, he performed at Bonnaroo music festival in Manchester, Tennessee and at the Festival Sudoeste TMN in Portugal. He also performed at the Harbourfront in Toronto, Ontario. Jorge's performances are known for their excitement as well as for getting the crowd moving. In January 2010 he performed with Thievery Corporation at Austin City Limits.

His album 'América Brasil' had a limited Brazilian release in 2007 under his label Cafuné Gravadora, distributed in the UK by Proper Music Distribution. In May 2010, Now-Again Records announced that Jorge's new album, Seu Jorge & Almaz, a collaboration with drummer Pupillo and guitarist Lucio Maia from Nação Zumbi and bassist and composer Antônio Pinto would be released in North America, Japan, Australia and New Zealand on July 27 and in Europe on September 14. The album has been described as "how powerful Brazilian soul music can be."

In 2011, he collaborated with Beck on the Mario C. remix of "Tropicália" for the Red Hot Organization's most recent charitable album "Red Hot+Rio 2."

In 2012, he collaborated with American fashion designer Rachel Roy on a line of sportswear, footwear, jewelry and handbags.

In 2015, he was nominated for the 16th Latin Grammy Awards in the Best Brazilian Contemporary Pop Album category.

On September 8, he performed after lighting the cauldron in the 2016 Summer Paralympics opening ceremony in Rio de Janeiro.

In 2022, Seu Jorge embarked on a U.S. tour with Daniel Jobim, performing classic bossa nova compositions in tribute to Tom Jobim, João Gilberto, and other icons of the genre. That same year, he headlined Rock in Rio Lisboa, blending samba and MPB in a set that was well received by both the public and critics. In 2023, Jorge appeared in a minor role in Wes Anderson's film Asteroid City. He released his album The Other Side in May 2026, having worked on it for the past 16 years.

== Solo discography ==
=== Studio albums ===
- (2003) Carolina
- (2004) Cru
- (2005) The Life Aquatic Studio Sessions
- (2007) América Brasil
- (2010) Seu Jorge & Almaz
- (2011) Músicas para Churrasco, Vol. 1
- (2015) Músicas para Churrasco, Vol. 2
- (2025) Baile a la Baiana
- (2026) The Other Side

=== Live/video albums ===
- (2004) MTV Presents: Seu Jorge
- (2005) Ana & Jorge (with Ana Carolina)
- (2006) Live at Montreux 2005
- (2009) América Brasil ao Vivo
- (2012) Músicas para Churrasco Vol. 1 ao Vivo

== Filmography ==
- (2002) City of God (as Mané Galinha - Knockout Ned)
- (2002) Moro no Brasil (as Himself)
- (2004) The Life Aquatic with Steve Zissou (as Pelé dos Santos)
- (2005) The House of Sand (as Massu - 1910-1919)
- (2006) Elipsis (as Coyote)
- (2007) Sleepwalkers
- (2008) The Escapist (as Viv Batista)
- (2008) Carmo (as Amparo de Jesus)
- (2010) Elite Squad: The Enemy Within (as Beirada)
- (2011) Anderson Silva: Like Water (as Himself)
- (2012) Reis e Ratos (as Américo Vilarinho)
- (2012) E Aí... Comeu? (as Seu Jorge, o Garçom)
- (2013) City of God – 10 Years Later (as Himself)
- (2016) Pelé: Birth of a Legend (as Dondinho)
- (2017) Soundtrack (as Cao)
- (2018) Paraíso Perdido (as Teylor)
- (2019) Marighella (as Carlos Marighella)
- (2019) Brotherhood (as Edison)
- (2020) Abe (as Chico)
- (2020) Executive Order (as Andre)
- (2021) Pixinguinha, Um Homem Carinhoso (as Pixinguinha)
- (2023) Asteroid City (as Cowboy)
- (2023) Anderson Spider Silva (as Benedito)
- (2025) The Best Mother in the World (as Leandro)
