= Ana & Jorge =

Live album by Ana Carolina and Seu Jorge
- Released: November 28, 2005 (Brazil); June 11, 2006 (World)
- Recorded: August 15, 2005
- Venue: Tom Brasil, São Paulo, Brazil
- Genre: MPB, alternative dance, pop, acoustic, bossa nova, samba
- Length: 56:12
- Language: Portuguese
- Label: Sony BMG
- Director: Mariana Jorge
- Producer: Ana Carolina

Ana & Jorge is a live album recorded by Brazilian singers Ana Carolina and Seu Jorge, and released on CD and DVD on November 28, 2005 through Sony BMG. In Brazil it was awarded Triple Platinum certification, as more than 300,000 copies were sold in the country.

== Background ==
Recorded at the Tom Brasil, in São Paulo, the show featured acoustic versions of hit songs from both singers' careers thus far, such as "São Gonça", "Carolina" and "Chatterton" (by Seu Jorge); and "Pra Rua Me Levar", "Garganta" and "Vestido Estampado" (by Ana Carolina).

The show also featured new songs such as "Nega Marrenta", "Notícias Populares" (later rerecorded by Ana as a double album "Dois Quartos", which in this show are just on the DVD), "Brasil Corrupção" (Ana Carolina's duet with Tom Zé) and "É Isso Aí" the Portuguese version of The Blower's Daughter, by the Irish musician Damien Rice, who was considered the most successful song on the album, being released as the first single.

== Tracklist ==
=== CD ===
No.	Title	Music	Length
1.	"São Gonça"	Seu Jorge	4:57
2.	"Problema Social"	Guará, Fernandinho	4:14
3.	"Zé do Caroço"	Leci Brandão	4:12
4.	"Carolina"	Seu Jorge	4:49
5.	"Comparsas / O Pequenez e o Pit Bull"	Ana Carolina, Seu Jorge, Gabriel Moura, Jovi Joviano, Aranha	4:57
6.	"Tanta Saudade"	Djavan, Chico Buarque	3:22
7.	"É Isso Aí (The Blower's Daughter)"	Damien Rice, adapted by Ana Carolina	5:18
8.	"Pra Rua me Levar"	Ana Carolina, Totonho Villeroy	3:42
9.	"Chatterton"	Serge Gainsbourg	4:22
10.	"Beatriz"	Edu Lobo, Chico Buarque	6:41
11.	"Brasil Corrupção (Unimultiplicidade)"	Tom Zé, Ana Carolina	2:50
12.	"Mais Que Isso"	Chico César, Ana Carolina	2:29
13.	"Garganta"	Totonho Villeroy	4:19
14.	"Vestido Estampado"	Ana Carolina	3:51
15.	"O Beat da Beata"	Ana Carolina, Seu Jorge	5:34

=== DVD ===
1. São Gonça
2. Tive Razão
3. Zé do Caroço
4. Brasis
5. Carolina
6. Comparsas / O Pequinês e o Pitbull
7. Tanta Saudade
8. É Isso Aí (The Blower's Daughter)
9. Pra Rua Me Levar
10. Chatterton
11. Nega Marrenta
12. Notícias Populares
13. Texto: Só de Sacanagem
14. Brasil Corrupção (Unimultiplicidade)
15. Beatriz
16. Mais Que Isso
17. Garganta
18. Vestido Estampado
19. O Beat da Beata
20. Convites Para A Vida (recorded in a samba)

==== Extras ====
- Mais Samba (excerpts written in samba style):
1. Se o Caminho é Meu / Sonho Meu / Alguém Me Avisou
2. Tendências
3. Quatro Toras de Queijo
- Making-of
- Text: "Alfredo, é Gisele"

== Personnel ==
- Bruno Batista – art direction
- Ana Carolina – guitar, vocals, pandeiro, producer, direction, bass
- Daniela Conolly – graphic design, art direction
- Pretinho DaSerrinha – cavaquinho
- Vitor Farias – engineer
- Carlinhos Freitas – mastering
- Marilene Gondim – producer, executive producer
- Seu Jorge – clarinet, guitar, vocals, pandeiro, direction, bass
- Bernardo Pacheco – sound technician
- Sérgio Ricardo – mixing
- Marcelo Sussekind – mixing

== Certifications ==
Country	Certification(s) (sales thresholds)	Sales
Brazil	3× Platinum	300,000+
