= List of accolades received by WandaVision =

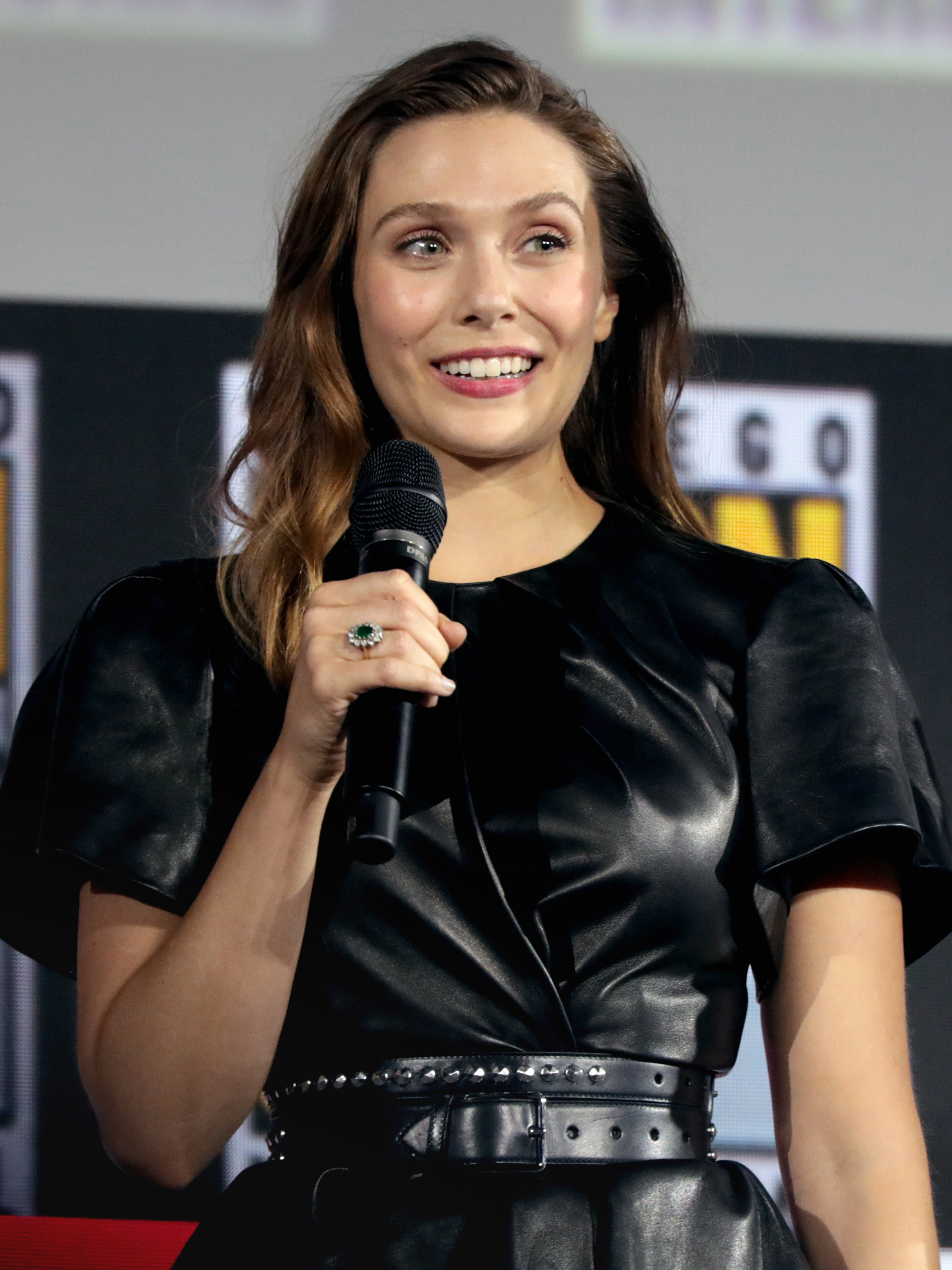
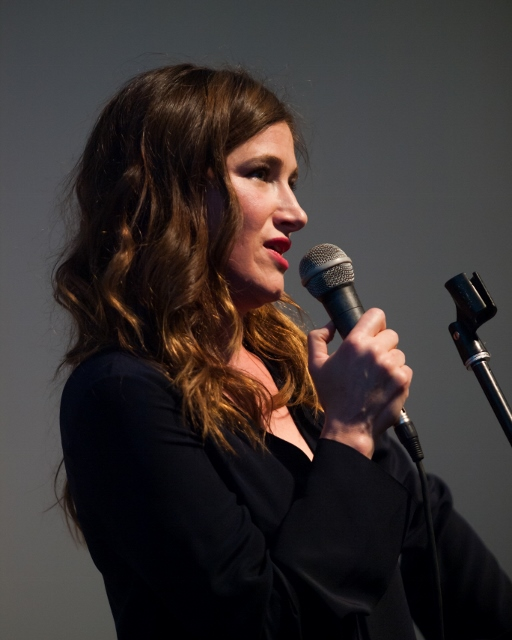
- Elizabeth Olsen and Kathryn Hahn received the most acting nominations for WandaVision.
Accolades
Award	Wins	Nominations
American Film Institute Awards	1	1
Annie Awards	0	1
Art Directors Guild Awards	1	1
Artios Awards	0	1
Black Reel Awards	0	1
BMI Film & TV Awards	1	1
Cinema Audio Society Awards	0	2
Clio Entertainment Awards	2	2
Clio Music Awards	1	1
Costume Designers Guild Awards	0	1
Critics' Choice Super Awards	3	5
Critics' Choice Television Awards	0	4
Directors Guild of America Awards	0	1
Dorian Awards	3	5
Dragon Awards	0	1
Golden Globe Awards	0	2
Golden Trailer Awards	1	4
Grammy Awards	0	1
Harvey Awards	1	1
Hollywood Critics Association TV Awards	2	7
Hollywood Music in Media Awards	0	1
Hollywood Professional Association Awards	1	2
Hugo Awards	0	1
ICG Publicists Awards	0	1
Irish Film & Television Awards	0	1
Make-Up Artists and Hair Stylists Guild Awards	0	3
MPSE Golden Reel Awards	0	1
MTV Millennial Awards	1	1
MTV Movie & TV Awards	4	6
Nebula Awards	1	1
Nickelodeon Kids' Choice Awards	0	2
People's Choice Awards	0	4
Primetime Creative Arts Emmy Awards	3	15
Primetime Emmy Awards	0	8
Producers Guild of America Awards	0	1
Satellite Awards	1	2
Saturn Awards	0	3
Shorty Awards	1	1
Society of Camera Operators Awards	0	1
TCA Awards	0	4
TV Choice Awards	0	1
USC Scripter Awards	0	1
Visual Effects Society Awards	0	3
World Soundtrack Awards	0	1
Writers Guild of America Awards	0	1

Totals (Note: Certain award groups do not simply award one winner. They acknowledge several different recipients, have runners-up, and have third place. Since this is a specific recognition and is different from losing an award, runner-up mentions are considered wins in this award tally. For simplification and to avoid errors, each award in this list has been presumed to have had a prior nomination.)
- Wins: 28
- Nominations: 109

WandaVision is an American television miniseries created by Jac Schaeffer for the streaming service Disney+ and based on Marvel Comics featuring the characters Wanda Maximoff / Scarlet Witch and Vision. It is the first television series in the Marvel Cinematic Universe (MCU) produced by Marvel Studios, with Schaeffer serving as head writer and Matt Shakman directing all nine episodes. Elizabeth Olsen and Paul Bettany reprise their respective roles as Wanda Maximoff and Vision from the MCU films, with Debra Jo Rupp, Fred Melamed, Kathryn Hahn, Teyonah Parris, Randall Park, Kat Dennings, and Evan Peters also part of the cast. The series pays homage to past sitcoms, with Maximoff and Vision living in a reality that takes them through different decades of television tropes.

WandaVision's first two episodes premiered on Disney+ on January 15, 2021; subsequent episodes were released weekly until March 5. The series garnered numerous awards and nominations; it was nominated for twenty-three Primetime Emmy Awards (the most of any limited series that year), including Outstanding Limited or Anthology Series, and won three Creative Arts Emmy Awards. From major guilds, it was nominated for a Producers Guild of America Award, a Writers Guild of America Award, and a Directors Guild of America Award. WandaVision was nominated for two Golden Globe Awards, four TCA Awards, and four Critics' Choice Television Awards. In genre awards, the series won three Critics' Choice Super Awards, a Harvey Award, and a Nebula Award and was nominated for three Saturn Awards, a Hugo Award, and a Dragon Award. The American Film Institute named WandaVision as one of the top television programs of 2021.

== Accolades ==
Accolades
Award	Date(s) of ceremony	Category	Recipient(s)	Result	Ref.
American Film Institute Awards	January 7, 2022	Television Programs of the Year	WandaVision	Won (Note: This award does not have a single winner, but recognizes multiple series.)	
Annie Awards	March 12, 2022	Best Sponsored Production	"Don't Touch That Dial" Title Sequence	Nominated	
Art Directors Guild Awards	March 5, 2022	Excellence in Production Design for a Television Movie or Limited Series	Mark Friedberg	Won	
Artios Awards	March 23, 2022	Limited Series	Sarah Halley Finn, Jason B. Stamey, Tara Feldstein Bennett (Location Casting), Chase Paris (Location Casting), and Djinous Rowling (Associate)	Nominated	
Black Reel Awards	August 15, 2021	Outstanding Supporting Actress, TV Movie or Limited Series	Teyonah Parris	Nominated	
BMI Film & TV Awards	May 11, 2022	BMI Streaming Series Awards	Kristen Anderson-Lopez and Robert Lopez	Won	
Cinema Audio Society Awards	March 19, 2022	Outstanding Achievement in Sound Mixing for Television Movie or Limited Series	Christopher Giles, Danielle Dupre, Casey Stone, Doc Kane, and Frank Rinella (for "Previously On")	Nominated	
Cinema Audio Society Awards	March 19, 2022	Outstanding Achievement in Sound Mixing for Television Movie or Limited Series	Christopher Giles, Michael Piotrowski, Danielle Dupre, Casey Stone, Doc Kane, and Malcolm Fife (for "The Series Finale")	Nominated	
Clio Entertainment Awards	December 14, 2021	Television/Streaming: Video Promo Mixed Campaign	WandaVision Creative Campaign	Gold	
Clio Entertainment Awards	December 14, 2021	Television/Streaming: Integrated Campaign	Marvel Studios' WandaVision - Marketing Campaign	Gold	
Clio Music Awards	June 10, 2021	Use of Music in Television Trailer/Teaser	"Homecoming" trailer	Silver	
Costume Designers Guild Awards	March 9, 2022	Excellence in Period Television	Mayes C. Rubeo (for "Filmed Before a Live Studio Audience")	Nominated	
Critics' Choice Super Awards	March 17, 2022	Best Superhero Series	WandaVision	Won	
Critics' Choice Super Awards	March 17, 2022	Best Actor in a Superhero Series	Paul Bettany	Nominated	
Critics' Choice Super Awards	March 17, 2022	Best Actress in a Superhero Series	Kathryn Hahn	Nominated	
Critics' Choice Super Awards	March 17, 2022	Best Actress in a Superhero Series	Elizabeth Olsen	Won	
Critics' Choice Super Awards	March 17, 2022	Best Villain in a Series	Kathryn Hahn	Won	
Critics' Choice Television Awards	March 13, 2022	Best Limited Series	WandaVision	Nominated	
Critics' Choice Television Awards	March 13, 2022	Best Actor in a Limited Series or Movie Made for Television	Paul Bettany	Nominated	
Critics' Choice Television Awards	March 13, 2022	Best Actress in a Limited Series or Movie Made for Television	Elizabeth Olsen	Nominated	
Critics' Choice Television Awards	March 13, 2022	Best Supporting Actress in a Limited Series or Movie Made for Television	Kathryn Hahn	Nominated	
Directors Guild of America Awards	April 10, 2021	Outstanding Directorial Achievement in Movies for Television and Limited Series	Matt Shakman	Nominated	
Dorian Awards	August 29, 2021	Best TV Performance	Elizabeth Olsen	Nominated	
Dorian Awards	August 29, 2021	Best Supporting TV Performance	Kathryn Hahn	Won	
Dorian Awards	August 29, 2021	Best TV Musical Performance	"Agatha All Along" by Kathryn Hahn	Won	
Dorian Awards	August 29, 2021	Most Visually Striking Show	WandaVision	Won	
Dorian Awards	August 29, 2021	Campiest TV Show	WandaVision	Nominated	
Dragon Awards	September 5, 2021	Best Science Fiction or Fantasy TV Series	WandaVision	Nominated	
Golden Globe Awards	January 9, 2022	Best Actor – Miniseries or Television Film	Paul Bettany	Nominated	
Golden Globe Awards	January 9, 2022	Best Actress – Miniseries or Television Film	Elizabeth Olsen	Nominated	
Golden Trailer Awards	July 22, 2021	Best Fantasy Adventure for a TV/Streaming Series (Trailer/Teaser/TV Spot)	"Believe" (Level Up AV)	Nominated	
Golden Trailer Awards	July 22, 2021	Best Music for a TV/Streaming Series (Trailer/Teaser/TV Spot)	"Believe" (Level Up AV)	Nominated	
Golden Trailer Awards	July 22, 2021	Most Original TV Spot/Trailer/Teaser for a Series	"Believe" (Level Up AV)	Won	
Golden Trailer Awards	July 22, 2021	Most Original TV Spot/Trailer/Teaser for a Series	"New Era" (MOCEAN)	Nominated	
Grammy Awards	April 3, 2022	Best Song Written for Visual Media	Kristen Anderson-Lopez and Robert Lopez (for "Agatha All Along")	Nominated	
Harvey Awards	October 8, 2021	Best Adaptation from Comic Book/Graphic Novel	WandaVision	Won	
Hollywood Critics Association TV Awards	August 29, 2021	Best Streaming Limited Series, Anthology Series, or Live-Action Television Movie	WandaVision	Won	
Hollywood Critics Association TV Awards	August 29, 2021	Best Actor in a Limited Series, Anthology Series, or Television Movie	Paul Bettany	Nominated	
Hollywood Critics Association TV Awards	August 29, 2021	Best Actress in a Limited Series, Anthology Series, or Television Movie	Elizabeth Olsen	Nominated	
Hollywood Critics Association TV Awards	August 29, 2021	Best Supporting Actor in a Limited Series, Anthology Series, or Television Movie	Randall Park	Nominated	
Hollywood Critics Association TV Awards	August 29, 2021	Best Supporting Actress in a Limited Series, Anthology Series, or Television Movie	Kat Dennings	Nominated	
Hollywood Critics Association TV Awards	August 29, 2021	Best Supporting Actress in a Limited Series, Anthology Series, or Television Movie	Kathryn Hahn	Won	
Hollywood Critics Association TV Awards	August 29, 2021	Best Supporting Actress in a Limited Series, Anthology Series, or Television Movie	Teyonah Parris	Nominated	
Hollywood Music in Media Awards	November 17, 2021	Best Original Score in a TV Show/Limited Series	Christophe Beck	Nominated	
Hollywood Professional Association Awards	November 18, 2021	Outstanding Color Grading – Episodic or Non-theatrical Feature	Matt Watson (for "Previously On")	Won	
Hollywood Professional Association Awards	November 18, 2021	Outstanding Visual Effects – Episodic (Under 13 Episodes) or Non-theatrical Feature	Marion Spates, Suzanne Foster, R. Matt Smith, Simon Twine, and Frankie Stellato (for "The Series Finale")	Nominated	
Hugo Awards	September 4, 2022	Best Dramatic Presentation, Long Form	Peter Cameron, Mackenzie Dohr, Laura Donney, Bobak Esfarjani, Megan McDonnell, Jac Schaeffer, Cameron Squires, Gretchen Enders, Chuck Hayward, and Matt Shakman	Nominated	
ICG Publicists Awards	March 25, 2022	Maxwell Weinberg Award for Television Publicity campaign	John Pisani	Nominated	
Irish Film & Television Awards	July 4, 2021	Best VFX	Ed Bruce and Jim O'Hagan	Nominated	
Make-Up Artists and Hair Stylists Guild Awards	February 19, 2022	Best Contemporary Make-Up	Tricia Sawyer and Vasilios Tanis	Nominated	
Make-Up Artists and Hair Stylists Guild Awards	February 19, 2022	Best Period and/or Character Make-Up	Tricia Sawyer, Vasilios Tanis, Regina Little, and Jonah Levy	Nominated	
Make-Up Artists and Hair Stylists Guild Awards	February 19, 2022	Best Period and/or Character Hair Styling	Karen Bartek, Cindy Welles, Nikki Wright, and Anna Quinn	Nominated	
MPSE Golden Reel Awards	March 13, 2022	Outstanding Achievement in Sound Editing – Limited Series or Anthology	Gwen Whittle, Kimberly Foscato, Steve Orlando, Scott Guitteau, Jon Borland, Samson Neslund, Richard Gould, Anele Onyekwere, James Spencer, Chris Gridley, Luke Dunn Gielmuda, Fernand Bos, Tom Kramer, Ronni Brown, Shelley Roden, and John Roesch (for "The Series Finale")	Nominated	
MTV Millennial Awards	July 13, 2021	Killer TV Series	WandaVision	Won	
MTV Movie & TV Awards	May 16, 2021	Best Show	WandaVision	Won	
MTV Movie & TV Awards	May 16, 2021	Best Performance in a Show	Elizabeth Olsen	Won	
MTV Movie & TV Awards	May 16, 2021	Best Hero	Teyonah Parris	Nominated	
MTV Movie & TV Awards	May 16, 2021	Best Villain	Kathryn Hahn	Won	
MTV Movie & TV Awards	May 16, 2021	Best Fight	Elizabeth Olsen vs. Kathryn Hahn	Won	
MTV Movie & TV Awards	May 16, 2021	Best Musical Moment	"Agatha All Along"	Nominated	
Nebula Awards	May 21, 2022	Ray Bradbury Nebula Award for Outstanding Dramatic Presentation	Peter Cameron, Mackenzie Dohr, Laura Donney, Bobak Esfarjani, Megan McDonnell, Jac Schaeffer, Cameron Squires, Gretchen Enders, and Chuck Hayward	Won	
Nickelodeon Kids' Choice Awards	April 9, 2022	Favorite Family TV Show	WandaVision	Nominated	
Nickelodeon Kids' Choice Awards	April 9, 2022	Favorite Female TV Star (Family)	Elizabeth Olsen	Nominated	
People's Choice Awards	December 7, 2021	Show of 2021	WandaVision	Nominated	
People's Choice Awards	December 7, 2021	Female TV Star of 2021	Elizabeth Olsen	Nominated	
People's Choice Awards	December 7, 2021	Female TV Star of 2021	Kathryn Hahn	Nominated	
People's Choice Awards	December 7, 2021	Sci-Fi/Fantasy Show of 2021	WandaVision	Nominated	
Primetime Creative Arts Emmy Awards	September 11–12, 2021	Outstanding Casting for a Limited or Anthology Series or Movie	Sarah Halley Finn and Jason B. Stamey	Nominated	
Primetime Creative Arts Emmy Awards	September 11–12, 2021	Outstanding Fantasy/Sci-Fi Costumes	Mayes C. Rubeo, Joseph Feltus, Daniel Selon, and Virginia Burton (for "Filmed Before a Live Studio Audience")	Won	
Primetime Creative Arts Emmy Awards	September 11–12, 2021	Outstanding Period and/or Character Hairstyling	Karen Bartek, Cindy Welles, Nikki Wright, Anna Quinn, and Yvonne Kupka (for "Don't Touch That Dial")	Nominated	
Primetime Creative Arts Emmy Awards	September 11–12, 2021	Outstanding Period and/or Character Makeup (Non-Prosthetic)	Tricia Sawyer, Vasilios Tanis, Jonah Levy, and Regina Little (for "Filmed Before a Live Studio Audience")	Nominated	
Primetime Creative Arts Emmy Awards	September 11–12, 2021	Outstanding Main Title Design	John LePore, Doug Appleton, Nick Woythaler, and Alex Rupert	Nominated	
Primetime Creative Arts Emmy Awards	September 11–12, 2021	Outstanding Music Composition for a Limited or Anthology Series, Movie or Special (Original Dramatic Score)	Christophe Beck (for "Previously On")	Nominated	
Primetime Creative Arts Emmy Awards	September 11–12, 2021	Original Main Title Theme Music	Kristen Anderson-Lopez and Robert Lopez	Nominated	
Primetime Creative Arts Emmy Awards	September 11–12, 2021	Outstanding Original Music and Lyrics	Kristen Anderson-Lopez and Robert Lopez (for "Agatha All Along")	Won	
Primetime Creative Arts Emmy Awards	September 11–12, 2021	Outstanding Music Supervision	Dave Jordan and Shannon Murphy (for "Don't Touch That Dial")	Nominated	
Primetime Creative Arts Emmy Awards	September 11–12, 2021	Outstanding Single-Camera Picture Editing for a Limited or Anthology Series or Movie	Nona Khodai (for "On a Very Special Episode...")	Nominated	
Primetime Creative Arts Emmy Awards	September 11–12, 2021	Outstanding Single-Camera Picture Editing for a Limited or Anthology Series or Movie	Zene Baker, Michael A. Webber, Tim Roche, and Nona Khodai (for "The Series Finale")	Nominated	
Primetime Creative Arts Emmy Awards	September 11–12, 2021	Outstanding Production Design for a Narrative Program (Half-Hour)	Mark Worthington, Sharon Davis, and Kathy Orlando	Won	
Primetime Creative Arts Emmy Awards	September 11–12, 2021	Outstanding Sound Editing for a Limited or Anthology Series, Movie or Special	Gwendolyn Yates Whittle, Kim Foscato, James Spencer, Chris Gridley, Steve Orlando, Scott Guitteau, Jon Borland, Samson Neslund, Richard Gould, Jordan Myers, Luke Dunn Gielmuda, Greg Peterson, Fernand Bos, Anele Onyekwere, Ronni Brown, and Shelley Roden (for "The Series Finale")	Nominated	
Primetime Creative Arts Emmy Awards	September 11–12, 2021	Outstanding Sound Mixing for a Limited or Anthology Series or Movie	Danielle Dupre, Chris Giles, Doc Kane, and Casey Stone (for "The Series Finale")	Nominated	
Primetime Creative Arts Emmy Awards	September 11–12, 2021	Outstanding Special Visual Effects in a Season or Movie	Tara deMarco, James Alexander, Sarah Eim, Sandra Balej, David Allen, Marion Spates, Steve Moncur, Julien Hery, and Ryan Freer	Nominated	
Primetime Emmy Awards	September 19, 2021	Outstanding Limited or Anthology Series	Kevin Feige, Louis D'Esposito, Victoria Alonso, Matt Shakman, Jac Schaeffer, Mary Livanos, Trevor Waterson, Gretchen Enders, and Chuck Hayward	Nominated	
Primetime Emmy Awards	September 19, 2021	Outstanding Lead Actor in a Limited or Anthology Series or Movie	Paul Bettany	Nominated	
Primetime Emmy Awards	September 19, 2021	Outstanding Lead Actress in a Limited or Anthology Series or Movie	Elizabeth Olsen	Nominated	
Primetime Emmy Awards	September 19, 2021	Outstanding Supporting Actress in a Limited or Anthology Series or Movie	Kathryn Hahn	Nominated	
Primetime Emmy Awards	September 19, 2021	Outstanding Directing for a Limited or Anthology Series or Movie	Matt Shakman	Nominated	
Primetime Emmy Awards	September 19, 2021	Outstanding Writing for a Limited or Anthology Series or Movie	Jac Schaeffer (for "Filmed Before a Live Studio Audience")	Nominated	
Primetime Emmy Awards	September 19, 2021	Outstanding Writing for a Limited or Anthology Series or Movie	Chuck Hayward and Peter Cameron (for "All-New Halloween Spooktacular!")	Nominated	
Primetime Emmy Awards	September 19, 2021	Outstanding Writing for a Limited or Anthology Series or Movie	Laura Donney (for "Previously On")	Nominated	
Producers Guild of America Awards	March 20, 2022	David L. Wolper Award for Outstanding Producer of Limited or Anthology Series Television	WandaVision	Nominated	
Satellite Awards	April 2, 2022	Best Television Series – Genre	WandaVision	Won	
Satellite Awards	April 2, 2022	Best Actor in a Television Series − Musical or Comedy	Paul Bettany	Nominated	
Saturn Awards	October 25, 2022	Best Fantasy Series (Streaming)	WandaVision	Nominated	
Saturn Awards	October 25, 2022	Best Actress in a Streaming Series	Elizabeth Olsen	Nominated	
Saturn Awards	October 25, 2022	Best Supporting Actress in a Streaming Series	Kathryn Hahn	Nominated	
Shorty Awards	April 26 – May 14, 2021	Best Overall Instagram Presence	WandaVision Instagram account	Won	
Society of Camera Operators Awards	April 11, 2021	Camera Operator of the Year – Television	Henry Tirl	Nominated	
TCA Awards	September 15, 2021	Program of the Year	WandaVision	Nominated	
TCA Awards	September 15, 2021	Outstanding Achievement in Movies, Miniseries and Specials	WandaVision	Nominated	
TCA Awards	September 15, 2021	Outstanding New Program	WandaVision	Nominated	
TCA Awards	September 15, 2021	Individual Achievement in Drama	Elizabeth Olsen	Nominated	
TV Choice Awards	September 6, 2021	Best Family Drama	WandaVision	Nominated	
USC Scripter Awards	February 26, 2022	Best Adapted TV Screenplay	Jac Schaeffer (for "Filmed Before a Live Studio Audience")	Nominated	
Visual Effects Society Awards	March 8, 2022	Outstanding Effects Simulations in an Episode, Commercial, or Real-Time Project	"Vision's Destruction" – Sylvian Nouveau, Hakim Harrouche, Omar Meradi, and Lauren Meste	Nominated	
Visual Effects Society Awards	March 8, 2022	Outstanding Compositing and Lighting in an Episode	"Goodbye, Vision" – David Zaretti, Bimpe Alliu, Michael Duong, and Mark Pascoe	Nominated	
Visual Effects Society Awards	March 8, 2022	Outstanding Compositing and Lighting in an Episode	"The Hex" – David Zaretti, Bimpe Alliu, Michael Duong, and Mark Pascoe	Nominated	
World Soundtrack Awards	October 23, 2021	TV Composer of the Year	Christophe Beck	Nominated	
Writers Guild of America Awards	March 20, 2022	Adapted Long Form	Peter Cameron, Mackenzie Dohr, Laura Donney, Bobak Esfarjani, Chuck Hayward, Megan McDonnell, Jac Schaeffer, and Cameron Squires	Nominated	
