= It May Look Like a Walnut =

- The Dick Van Dyke Show episode
- Episode no.: Season 2 Episode 20
- Original air date: February 6, 1963

Guest appearance
- Danny Thomas

"It May Look Like a Walnut" is the 20th episode in season 2 of the TV series The Dick Van Dyke Show that aired February 6, 1963. The episode was ranked #15 in TV Guide's ''Top 100 Episodes of All Time'' 1997 list. It moved up to #13 in TV Guide's revised 2009 list.

== Synopsis ==
Rob enjoys a scary sci-fi movie on TV while Laura cowers under the bed covers so as to not see or hear it. When the show ends, Rob further tortures Laura by telling the tale of Kolak, a visitor from the planet Twilo who resembles Danny Thomas and deploys walnuts to steal Earthlings' thumbs and imaginations. Rob awakes in the morning to a living room strewn with walnuts and Laura preparing scrambled walnuts for Rob's breakfast. Everyone at the office is acting as if Kolak really existed. Is Rob dreaming or is Laura having her revenge?

== Cast ==
=== Main ===
- Dick Van Dyke - Rob Petrie
- Rose Marie - Sally Rogers
- Morey Amsterdam - Buddy Sorrell
- Larry Mathews - Ritchie Petrie
- Mary Tyler Moore - Laura Petrie

=== Recurring ===
- Richard Deacon - Mel Cooley
- Carl Reiner - Alan Brady

=== Guest ===
- Danny Thomas - Kolak

== Production ==
The concept for the episode was a parody of The Twilight Zone. As writer Carl Reiner noted, it was his own version, "with seventeen hundred walnuts". Additional inspiration for the episode came from other science fiction of the day, including Invasion of the Body Snatchers.

The episode was filmed January 15, 1963.

== Release ==
"It May Look Like a Walnut" aired on February 6, 1963, as episode 51.

== Reception ==
The episode was ranked #15 in TV Guide's ''Top 100 Episodes of All Time'' 1997 list. It moved up to #13 in TV Guide's revised 2009 list.

== In other media ==
A clip from this episode is also shown in the WandaVision episode "Previously On" (2021).
