= The Dick Van Dyke Show =

American sitcom (1961–1966)

- Colorized version of opening title card. The original show aired in black and white.
- Genre: Sitcom
- Created by: Carl Reiner
- Written by: Carl Reiner; Frank Tarloff (as "David Adler"); John Whedon; Sheldon Keller; Howard Merrill; Martin Ragaway; Bill Persky; Sam Denoff; Garry Marshall; Jerry Belson; Carl Kleinschmitt; Dale McRaven; Rick Mittleman
- Directed by: Sheldon Leonard; John Rich; Jerry Paris; Howard Morris; Alan Rafkin
- Starring: Dick Van Dyke; Mary Tyler Moore; Rose Marie; Morey Amsterdam; Larry Mathews; Richard Deacon
- Theme music composer: Earle Hagen
- Composer: Earle Hagen
- Country of origin: United States
- No. of seasons: 5
- No. of episodes: 158 half-hour black-and-white episodes + 1 reunion special in color (list of episodes)

Production
- Executive producers: Sheldon Leonard, in association with Danny Thomas
- Producers: Carl Reiner; Bill Persky; Sam Denoff
- Running time: 22–24 minutes
- Production companies: Calvada Productions; CBS Productions

Original release
- Network: CBS
- Release: October 3, 1961 – June 1, 1966

Related
- The New Dick Van Dyke Show

The Dick Van Dyke Show is an American sitcom created and produced by Carl Reiner that initially aired on CBS from October 3, 1961, to June 1, 1966, with a total of 158 half-hour episodes spanning five seasons. It was produced by Calvada Productions (Note: "Calvada" is derived from the letters from producers CArl Reiner, Sheldon Leonard, VAn Dyke and DAnny Thomas. Source: The Dick Van Dyke Show: Anatomy of a Classic) in association with the CBS Television Network, and was shot at Desilu Studios. The music for the show's theme song was written by Earle Hagen.

The show starred Dick Van Dyke, Mary Tyler Moore, Rose Marie, Morey Amsterdam, and Larry Mathews. The Dick Van Dyke Show centered on the work and home life of television comedy writer Rob Petrie (Dick Van Dyke), the head writer for the fictitious variety show The Alan Brady Show in New York, who lived in suburban New Rochelle, New York with USO dancer turned housewife Laura Petrie (Mary Tyler Moore) and young son Ritchie (Larry Mathews). The series portrayed comic scenarios that Rob Petrie found himself in the middle of with his family, his colleagues – Buddy Sorrell (Morey Amsterdam), Sally Rogers (Rose Marie), Mel Cooley (Richard Deacon) – and his neighbors Millie (Ann Morgan Guilbert) and Jerry Helper (Jerry Paris) and friends.

The series won 15 Emmy Awards. In 1997, the episodes "Coast to Coast Big Mouth" and "It May Look Like a Walnut" were ranked at 8 and 15 respectively on TV Guide's 100 Greatest Episodes of All Time. In 2002, the series was ranked at 13 on TV Guide's 50 Greatest TV Shows of All Time and in 2013 it was ranked at 20 on their list of the 60 Best Series. Also in 2013, the Writers Guild of America ranked it #14 on their list of the 101 Best Written TV Series.

== Premise ==
The two main settings are the work and home life of Rob Petrie (Dick Van Dyke), the head writer of a comedy/variety show produced in Manhattan. Viewers are given an "inside look" at how a television show (the fictitious variety program The Alan Brady Show) was written and produced. Many scenes deal with Rob and his co-writers, Buddy Sorrell (Morey Amsterdam) and Sally Rogers (Rose Marie). Mel Cooley (Richard Deacon), a balding straight man and recipient of numerous insulting one-liners from Buddy, was the show's producer and the brother-in-law of the show's star, Alan Brady (Carl Reiner). As Rob, Buddy, and Sally write for a comedy show, the premise provides a built-in forum for them to constantly make jokes. Other scenes focus on the home life of Rob, his wife Laura (Mary Tyler Moore), and son Ritchie (Larry Mathews), who live in suburban New Rochelle, New York. Also often seen are their next-door neighbors and best friends, Jerry Helper (Jerry Paris), a dentist, and his wife Millie (Ann Morgan Guilbert).

Many of the characters in The Dick Van Dyke Show were based on real people, as Carl Reiner created the show based on his time spent as head writer for the Sid Caesar vehicle Your Show of Shows. Carl Reiner portrayed Alan Brady who is a combination of the abrasive Milton Berle and Jackie Gleason, according to Reiner, refuting rumors that Alan Brady was based on Caesar. Van Dyke's character was based on Reiner himself. Moore's character's "look" was influenced to some extent by that of Jackie Kennedy, who was at the time First Lady of the United States.

== Head of the Family pilot ==
The Dick Van Dyke Show was preceded by a 1960 pilot for a series to be called Head of the Family, filmed at Gold Medal Studios, with a different cast, although the characters were essentially the same, except for the absence of Mel Cooley. In the pilot, Carl Reiner, who created the show based on his own experiences as a TV writer, played Robbie Petrie. Laura Petrie was played by Barbara Britton, Buddy Sorrell by Morty Gunty, Sally Rogers by Sylvia Miles, Ritchie by Gary Morgan, and Alan Sturdy, the Alan Brady character, was played by Jack Wakefield, although his face was never fully seen, which was also the case with Carl Reiner's Alan Brady for the first three seasons of The Dick Van Dyke Show.

Broadcast on CBS as an episode of the summer anthology series The Comedy Spot on July 19, 1960, the pilot was unsuccessful. Producer Sheldon Leonard later saw Reiner's pilot and concluded that the show could be successful if the character Reiner played, Rob Petrie, was recast with a different actor. Leonard later recalled, "The only honest thing I could say was, 'Carl, you're not right for what you wrote for yourself.'" Reiner reworked the show with Dick Van Dyke playing the central character (who went by Rob, not "Robbie", and pronounced his last name PET-tree rather than the pilot's PEE-tree.) The season one episode "Father of the Week" was partly based on this pilot.

There's no way I could ever have brought to this part what Dick Van Dyke did. He was masterful. I think he's the best light situation comedy performer who ever lived. — Carl Reiner in The Dick Van Dyke Show: Anatomy of a Classic

== Episodes ==
Season	Episodes	Originally released		Rank	Rating
Season	Episodes	First released	Last released	Rank	Rating
Pilot		July 19, 1960		—N/a	—N/a
1	30	October 3, 1961	April 18, 1962	80	16.1
2	32	September 26, 1962	May 8, 1963	9	27.1
3	32	September 25, 1963	May 13, 1964	3	33.3
4	32	September 23, 1964	May 26, 1965	7	27.1
5	32	September 15, 1965	June 1, 1966	16	23.6

At least four episodes were filmed without a live studio audience: "The Bad Old Days", which featured an extended flashback sequence that relied on optical effects that would have been impractical to shoot with a live audience in the studio; "The Alan Brady Show Presents", which required elaborate set and costume changes; "Happy Birthday and Too Many More", which was filmed on November 26, 1963, only four days after President Kennedy's assassination; and "The Gunslinger", which was filmed on location. "The Last Chapter" was the last episode that aired; "The Gunslinger" was the last episode filmed.

=== In color ===
Reiner considered moving the production of the series to full color as early as season three, only to drop the idea when he was informed that it would add about US$7,000 (equivalent to $74,000 in 2025) to the cost of each episode. In 2016, several episodes were colorized by West Wing Studios and aired on CBS.

- "That’s My Boy" (ep. 1, s. 3) – first broadcast December 11, 2016
- "Coast to Coast Big Mouth" (ep. 1, s. 5) – December 11, 2016 and July 3, 2020
- "My Blonde-Haired Brunette" (ep. 2, s. 1) – December 22, 2017
- "October Eve" (ep. 28, s. 3) – December 22, 2017 and July 3, 2020
- "Where Did I Come From?" (ep. 15, s. 1) – December 14, 2018 and May 28, 2021
- "Never Bathe on Saturday" (ep. 27, s. 4) – December 14, 2018 and May 28, 2021
- "Baby Fat" (ep. 29, s. 4) – May 21, 2021
- "The Bottom of Mel Cooley's Heart" (ep. 19, s. 5) – May 21, 2021

== Characters ==
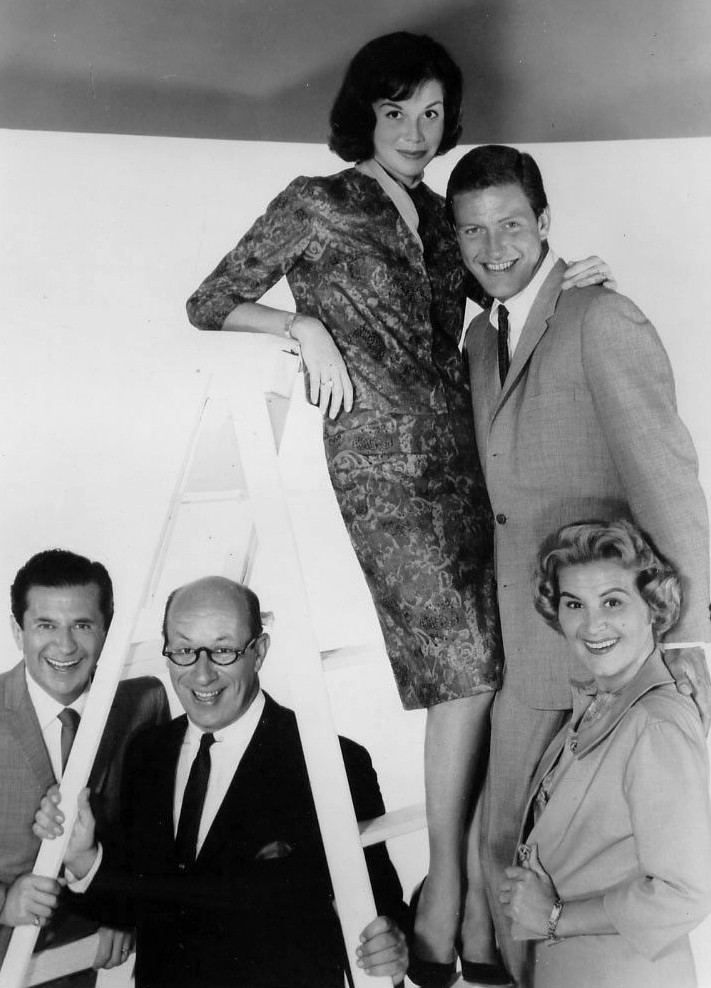
Morey Amsterdam, Richard Deacon, Mary Tyler Moore, Dick Van Dyke, and Rose Marie

Main:

- Robert "Rob" Simpson Petrie (Dick Van Dyke) – Rob is the head writer of the comedy writing team for the fictional TV variety show, The Alan Brady Show, working with Sally Rogers and Buddy Sorrell. When not working, Rob enjoys life with his wife Laura Petrie, played by Mary Tyler Moore, and his son, Ritchie Petrie, portrayed by Larry Mathews. Rob, Laura, and Ritchie live in New Rochelle, New York. Their neighbors are longtime friends, Millie Helper and her dentist husband Jerry Helper. Rob is a big fan of old-time radio, cowboy movies, and Laurel and Hardy, as well as an excellent mime and fan of pantomime. He incorporates many favorite routines into his comedy writing. He has living parents, Sam and Clara Petrie. Rob was born in Danville, Illinois (Dick Van Dyke's boyhood home), along with younger brother Stacey Petrie, and served in the military at Camp Crowder, Missouri as a Special Services Sergeant. There he met his future wife, Laura Meehan, a USO dancer. After a number of jobs, he was hired by Alan Brady.
- Laura Petrie (Mary Tyler Moore) – Laura (née Meeker/Meehan) is Rob's wife. As a 17-year-old dancer in the United Service Organizations, she met and married Rob. Then, she became a stay-at-home mom. In early Season One episodes, Rob and others call her "Laurie" numerous times, as opposed to "Laura", which became his usual name for her. About 60 actresses auditioned for the part before Moore was signed. Moore later wrote that she almost skipped the audition.
- Maurice "Buddy" Sorrell (Morey Amsterdam) – Buddy is an energetic and at times sarcastic "human joke machine", and one of the comedy writers. Amsterdam was recommended for the role by Rose Marie as soon as she had signed on to the series. Buddy is constantly making fun of Mel Cooley, the show's producer, for being bald and dull. His character is loosely based on Mel Brooks who also wrote for Your Show of Shows. He makes frequent jokes about his marriage to his wife, former showgirl Fiona "Pickles" Conway Sorrell, who is a terrible cook. In several episodes, it is mentioned that Buddy is Jewish. He was identified by his birth name, Moishe Selig, when he had his belated bar mitzvah in "Buddy Sorrell – Man and Boy." Buddy plays the cello, which he sometimes incorporates into his comedy routines, and owns a large German Shepherd named Larry. Buddy made a guest appearance on the Danny Thomas Show episode, "The Woman Behind the Jokes" that aired October 21, 1963.
- Sally Rogers (Rose Marie) – Sally is another of the comedy writers, and the designated typist, who is always on the lookout for a husband. The character was loosely based on Selma Diamond and Lucille Kallen, both writers for Your Show of Shows. She never drinks and quotes frequently from her "Aunt Agnes in Cleveland". She has an on-again/off-again relationship with her boyfriend Herman Glimscher, who seems to be too much of a mama's boy to get married. She frequently scares men off with her sense of humor and strong personality.
- Richard "Ritchie" Rosebud Petrie (Larry Mathews) – Rob and Laura's son. His middle name is an acronym for "Robert Oscar Sam Edward Benjamin Ulysses David," all the names suggested by members of Rob and Laura's families in the episode "What's in a Middle Name?".

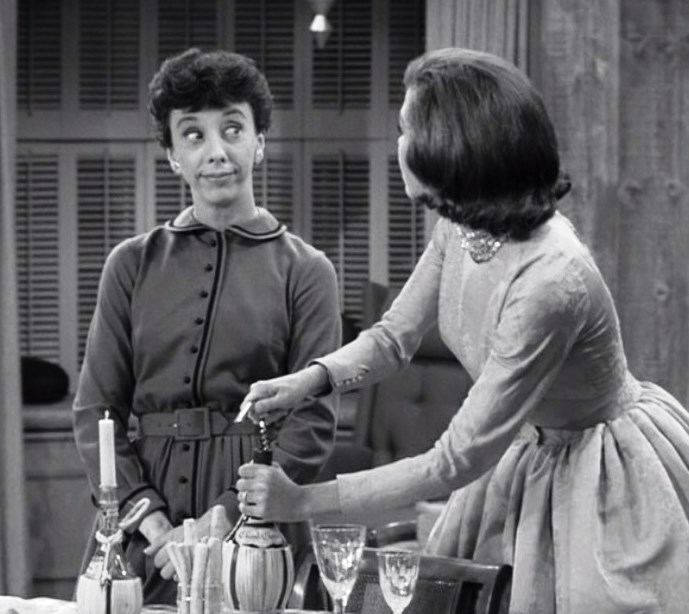
Ann Morgan Guilbert alongside Mary Tyler Moore

Supporting:

- Melvin "Mel" Cooley (Richard Deacon) – Mel is the balding producer of The Alan Brady Show and Alan Brady's brother-in-law. Though Mel can often be an obsequiously sycophantic yes-man to the demanding Brady, he is also shown to be a dedicated, competent producer who takes his responsibilities very seriously. Mel is constantly at odds with Buddy, who often makes insulting comments about Mel's baldness, to which Mel often responds with a simple "Yechh!"
- Millie Helper (Ann Morgan Guilbert) – Millie is the Petries' neighbor and Laura's best friend from their days in the USO.
- Jerry Helper (Jerry Paris) – Jerry is the Petries' neighbor, Millie's husband, Rob's best friend and dentist. He is an avid sailor, audiophile, and electronics and recording enthusiast.
- Alan Brady (Carl Reiner) – Alan is the egocentric, demanding, high maintenance, toupee-wearing star of The Alan Brady Show. Originally an unseen character, then shown only with his back to the camera or only in voice, Brady began to make full-face appearances in season four.

Recurring:

- Stacey Petrie (Jerry Van Dyke) – Rob's brother, played by Dick Van Dyke's real-life brother. Stacey – a quiet, shy, man – is prone to episodes of sleepwalking, during which he becomes, literally, the banjo-playing life of the party, and calls his brother Rob "Burford". He wrote love letters on behalf of his friend, a drummer named James Garner (not the famous actor) to a girl named Julie. Once Garner lost interest, Stacey continued to write to Julie as Garner because he had fallen in love with her. He confesses the truth, and eventually Julie becomes interested in getting to know him.
- Fiona "Pickles" Conway Sorrell (Barbara Perry/Joan Shawlee) – Buddy's slightly nutty wife and former showgirl. Pickles's first marriage was to a convicted con man who threatens to tell Buddy she was married to a jailbird unless she bribes him regularly. She becomes an off-screen character after season two.
- Herman Glimscher (Bill Idelson) – Sally's occasional and nerdy boyfriend. In the 2004 reunion special, Sally and Herman had been married for years (In an early episode, Sally mentioned having dated a Woodrow Glimscher, presumably a relative, until Woodrow's overbearing mother arranged for her to date Herman instead.)
- Sam (or Edward) Petrie – (Will Wright/J. Pat O'Malley/Tom Tully) – Rob and Stacey's father, Laura's father-in-law, and Clara's husband.
- Clara Petrie – (Carol Veazie/Isabel Randolph) – Rob's and Stacey's mother, Laura's mother-in-law, and Sam's wife. Clara doesn't like Laura, partly because Laura and Rob married quickly without either set of parents attending the wedding.
- Mr. and Mrs. Alan Meehan – (Carl Benton Reid and Geraldine Wall) are Laura's parents.
- Freddie Helper (Peter Oliphant) – Millie and Jerry Helper's son and Ritchie's best friend.
- Sol/Sam Pomeroy/Pomerantz – Rob's army buddy in flashback episodes, was originally played by Marty Ingels. The character's names changed over the course of the series. Ingels left the role in 1962 to star in I'm Dickens, He's Fenster. In 1963 the character was played by two actors, Allan Melvin and Henry Calvin.
- Delivery boy – there were actually two wisecracking lunch delivery boys, who would deliver lunch and snacks to the writers room at The Alan Brady Show. The first, played by Jamie Farr, appeared in four season one episodes, and was dubbed "Ptomaine Charlie" by Sally. Subsequently, a second delivery boy was given the name Willie, and Herbie Faye played the role (Faye also played other characters in later episodes).
- Mrs. Billings (Eleanor Audley) – the head of the local Parent-Teacher Association, who shoehorns Rob into writing and directing their annual fundraising shows.

A group of character actors played several different roles during the five seasons. Actors who appeared more than once, sometimes in different roles, included Elvia Allman (as Herman Glimscher's mother), Tiny Brauer, Bella Bruck, Jane Dulo, Herbie Faye, Bernard Fox, Dabbs Greer, Jerry Hausner, Peter Hobbs, Jackie Joseph, Sandy Kenyon (who also appeared in the 2004 reunion special), Alvy Moore, Isabel Randolph, Burt Remsen, Johnny Silver, Doris Singleton, Amzie Strickland, George Tyne, Herb Vigran and Len Weinrib. Frank Adamo, who served as Van Dyke's personal assistant and stand-in, also played small roles throughout the show's five seasons.

== Production ==
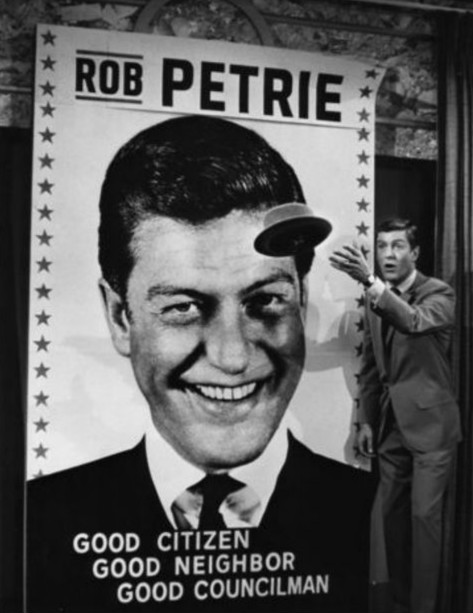
Rob throws his hat into the ring in the election for city councilman, 1965

The Dick Van Dyke Show was filmed before a live audience (one of the few sitcoms at the time to do so) at Desilu-Cahuenga Studios in Hollywood, California, with audience "sweetening" performed in post-production.

Many of the show's plots were inspired by Reiner's experiences as a writer for Your Show of Shows and Caesar's Hour, both of which starred Sid Caesar. Reiner based the character of Rob Petrie on himself, but Rob's egocentric boss Alan Brady is not based on Caesar, but is a combination of the abrasive Milton Berle and Jackie Gleason, according to Reiner.

Johnny Carson was a finalist for the role of Rob Petrie, but Sheldon Leonard selected Van Dyke based on his Broadway performance in Bye Bye Birdie.

CBS had intended to cancel Van Dyke after its first season, but Procter & Gamble threatened to pull its advertising from "the network's extremely lucrative daytime lineup" and the show was renewed, keeping its Wednesday night time slot. Helped by having The Beverly Hillbillies, the number one show, as its lead-in, Van Dyke jumped into the top 10 by the third episode of its second season.

The week of the final broadcast in June 1966, Life magazine reported: "The series is not being killed by the network. CBS is drooling to continue this consistent entry in the Nielsen top 20. But the five-year-old show decided to retire. 'We wanted to quit while we were still proud of it,' said Van Dyke."

In 2019 the show's archives were donated to the National Comedy Center in Jamestown, New York.

=== Crossovers ===
- On October 21, 1963, Morey Amsterdam guest-starred as Buddy Sorrell during the final season of The Danny Thomas Show on the episode "The Woman Behind the Jokes".
- Rose Marie and Morey Amsterdam reprised their roles on October 7, 1993, in the "When Hairy Met Hermy" episode of Herman's Head.
- Carl Reiner reprised the role of Alan Brady on the February 16, 1995, episode of Mad About You, a guest appearance that won him the Primetime Emmy Award for Outstanding Guest Actor in a Comedy Series.

== Opening ==
During the first season, the show opened with headshots of Van Dyke, followed by stills from episodes. For the second season, Reiner and director John Rich devised a new opening sequence, in which Rob would be seen entering the home and greeting Laura. There were several versions of the opening, used at random; in some episodes Rob would trip over an ottoman, and in other episodes he would step around it.

The show's theme was by Earle Hagen, who also wrote many other TV series themes, including those for The Andy Griffith Show, Gomer Pyle, U.S.M.C., I Spy, and The Mod Squad.

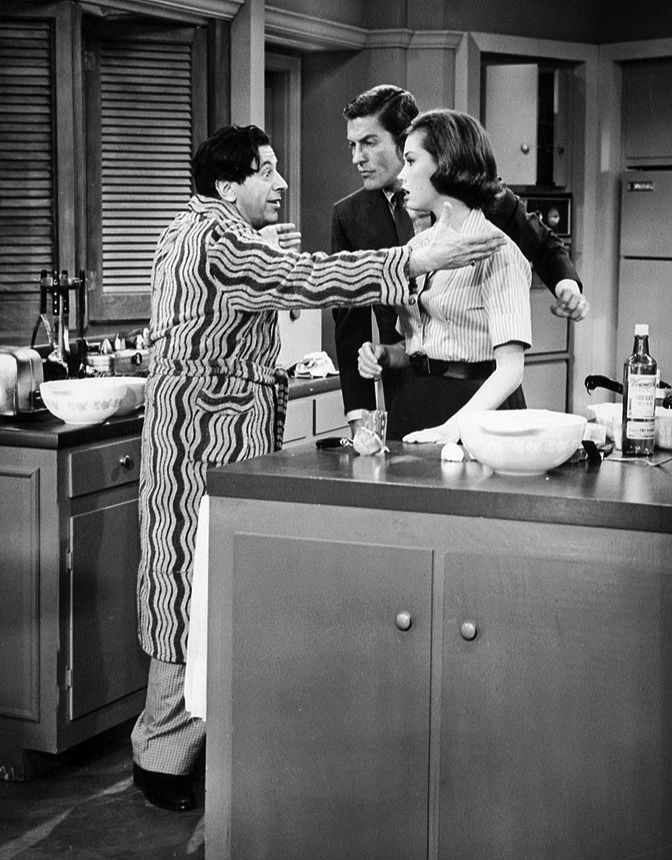
While his wife is away, Buddy becomes the Petries' houseguest.

In a 2004 TVLand Awards appearance, Van Dyke revealed Morey Amsterdam's lyrics for the show's theme song:

So you think that you've got trouble?
Well, trouble's a bubble
So tell old Mr. Trouble to get lost!

Why not hold your head up high and
Stop cryin', start tryin'
And don't forget to keep your fingers crossed.

When you find the joy of livin'
Is lovin' and givin'
You'll be there when the winning dice are tossed.

A smile is just a frown that's turned upside down
So smile, and that frown will defrost.

And don't forget to keep your fingers crossed.

== Broadcast history and Nielsen ratings ==
Season	TV season	Time slot (ET)	Nielsen ratings	
Season	TV season	Time slot (ET)	Rank	Rating
1	1961–62	Tuesday at 8:00 pm (October 3 - December 26, 1961); Wednesday at 9:30 pm (January 3 - April 18, 1962)	80	16.1
2	1962–63	Wednesday at 9:30 pm	9	27.1
3	1963–64	Wednesday at 9:30 pm	3	33.3
4	1964–65	Wednesday at 9:00 pm	7	27.1
5	1965–66	Wednesday at 9:30 pm	16	23.6

== Primetime Emmy Awards ==
The Dick Van Dyke Show was nominated for 25 Primetime Emmy Awards and won 15.

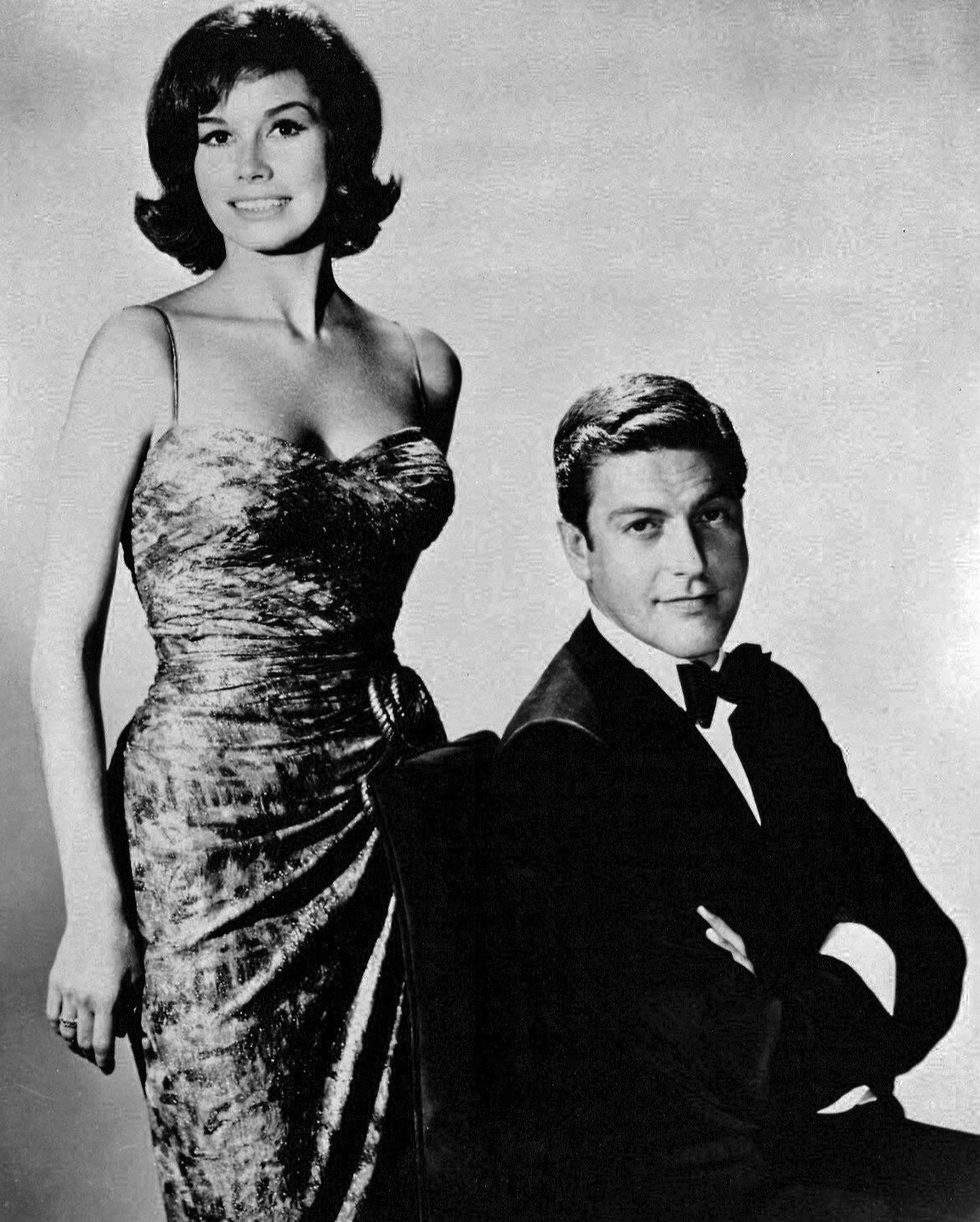
Laura and Rob, 1964

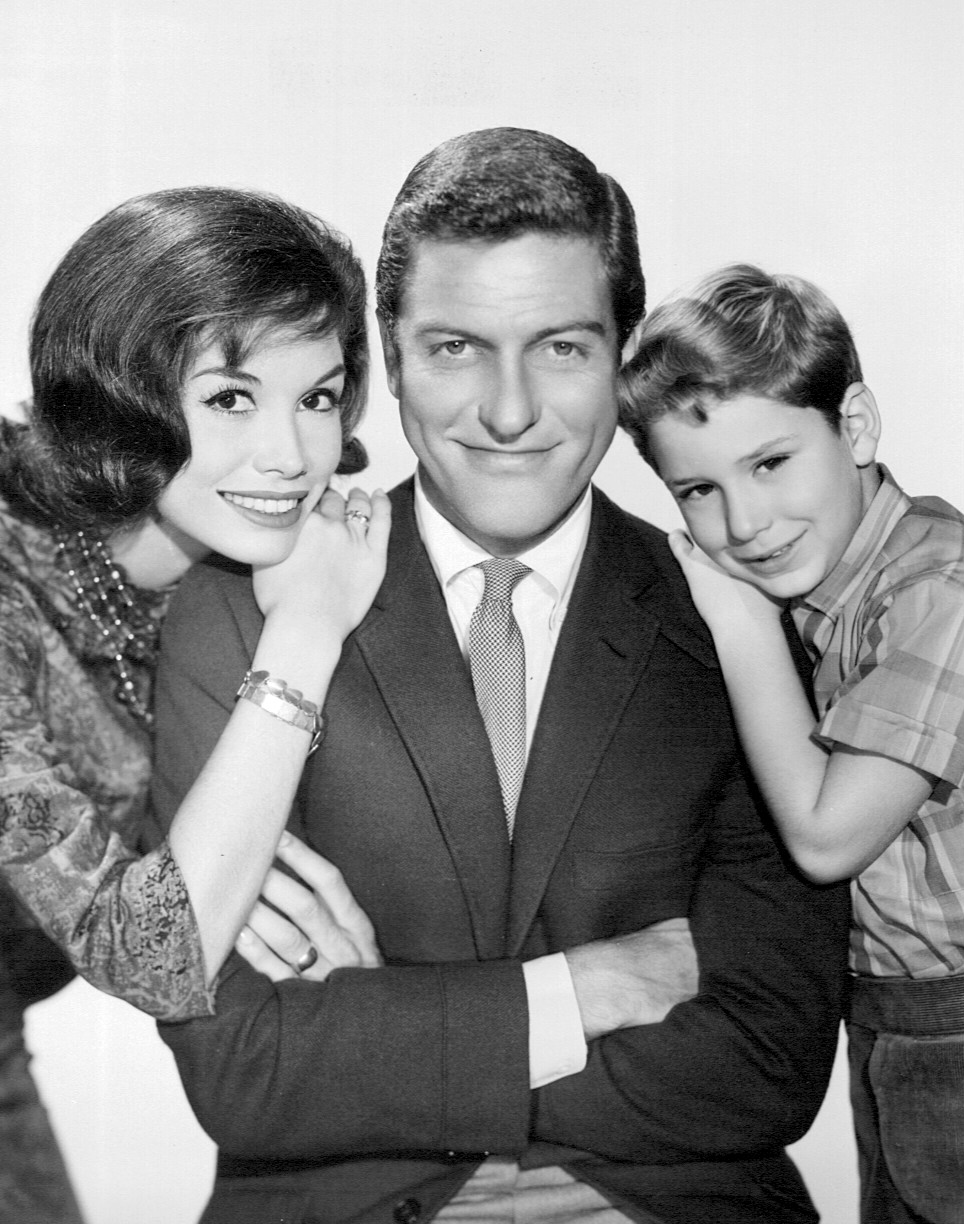
Laura, Rob and Ritchie Petrie, 1963

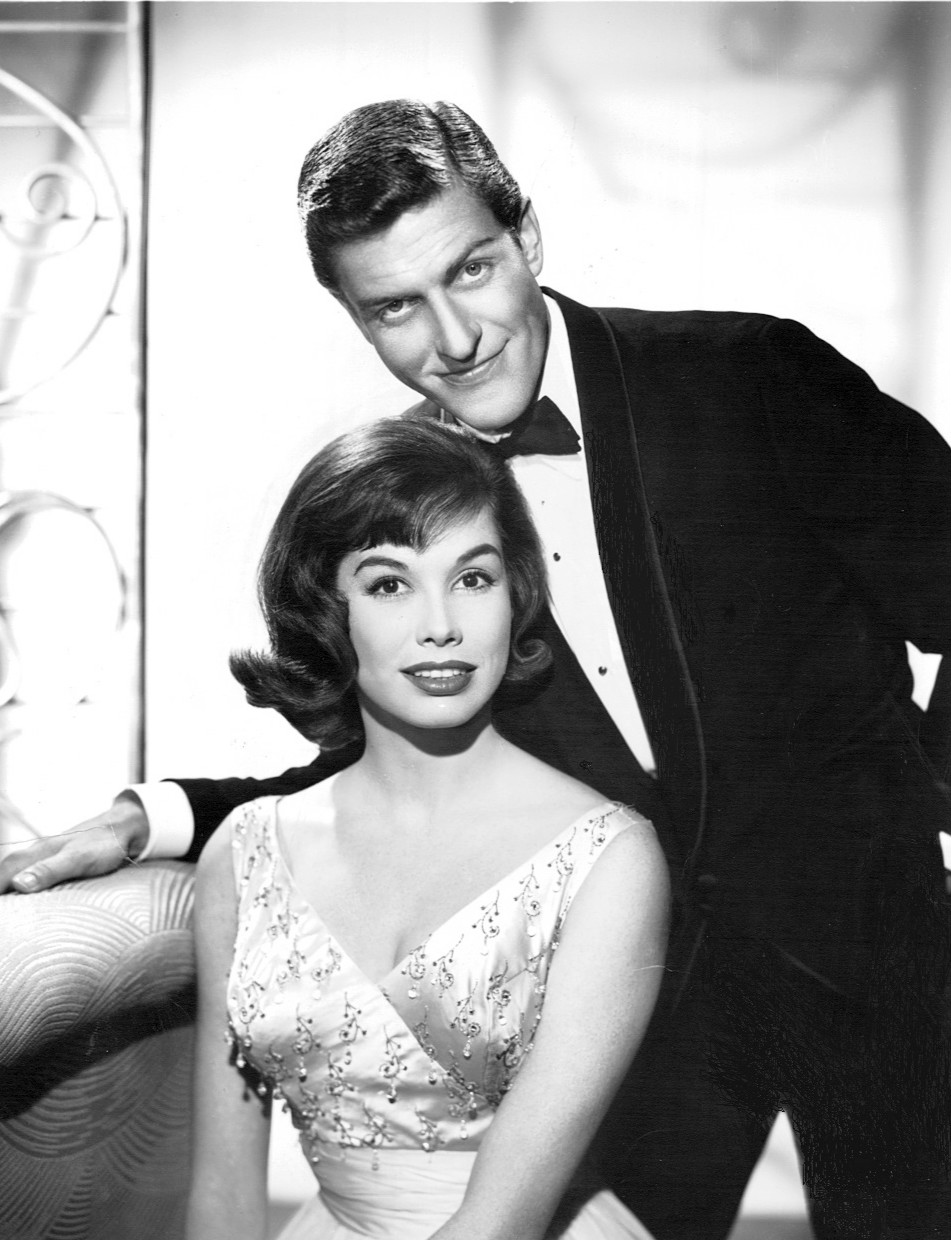
Rob and Laura, 1961

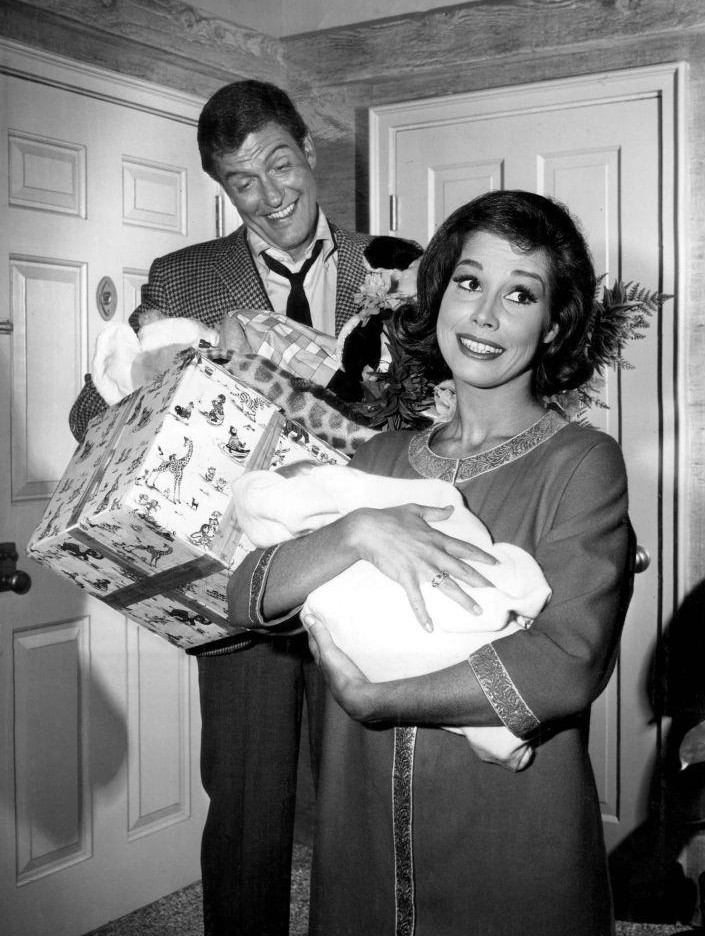
Baby flashback, 1963

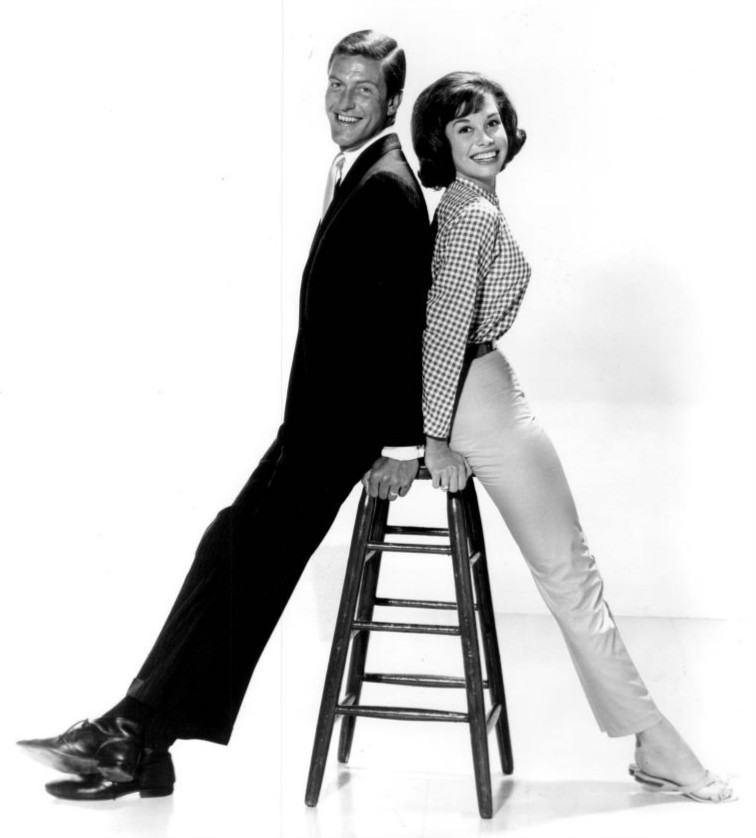
Rob (Dick Van Dyke) and Laura (Mary Tyler Moore), 1961

Award	Nominee	Result
1961–1962 (presented May 22, 1962)
Outstanding Directorial Achievement in Comedy	John Rich	Nominated
Outstanding Writing Achievement in Comedy	Carl Reiner	Won
1962–1963 (presented May 26, 1963)
Outstanding Program Achievement in the Field of Humor	—	Won
Outstanding Continued Performance by an Actor in a Series (Lead)	Dick Van Dyke	Nominated
Outstanding Continued Performance by an Actress in a Series (Lead)	Mary Tyler Moore	Nominated
Outstanding Performance in a Supporting Role by an Actress	Rose Marie	Nominated
Outstanding Directorial Achievement in Comedy	John Rich	Won
Outstanding Writing Achievement in Comedy	Carl Reiner	Won
1963–1964 (presented May 25, 1964)
Outstanding Program Achievement in the Field of Comedy	—	Won
Outstanding Continued Performance by an Actor in a Series (Lead)	Dick Van Dyke	Won
Outstanding Continued Performance by an Actress in a Series (Lead)	Mary Tyler Moore	Won
Outstanding Performance in a Supporting Role by an Actress	Rose Marie	Nominated
Outstanding Directorial Achievement in Comedy	Jerry Paris	Won
Outstanding Writing Achievement in Comedy or Variety	Carl Reiner, Sam Denoff and Bill Persky	Won
1964–1965 (presented September 12, 1965)
Outstanding Program Achievements in Entertainment	Carl Reiner, producer	Won (Note: Shared with George Schaefer for Hallmark Hall of Fame: "The Magnificent Yankee", Richard Lewine for My Name Is Barbra and Roger Englander for New York Philharmonic Young People's Concerts with Leonard Bernstein)
Outstanding Individual Achievements in Entertainment - Actors and Performers	Dick Van Dyke	Won (Note: Shared with Leonard Bernstein for New York Philharmonic Young People's Concerts with Leonard Bernstein, Lynn Fontanne and Alfred Lunt for Hallmark Hall of Fame: "The Magnificent Yankee" and Barbra Streisand for My Name Is Barbra)
Outstanding Individual Achievements in Entertainment - Writers	Carl Reiner for "Never Bathe on Saturday"	Nominated
1965–1966 (presented May 22, 1966)
Outstanding Comedy Series	Carl Reiner, producer	Won
Outstanding Continued Performance by an Actor in a Leading Role in a Comedy Series	Dick Van Dyke	Won
Outstanding Continued Performance by an Actress in a Leading Role in a Comedy Series	Mary Tyler Moore	Won
Outstanding Performance by an Actor in a Supporting Role in a Comedy	Morey Amsterdam	Nominated
Outstanding Performance by an Actress in a Supporting Role in a Comedy	Rose Marie	Nominated
Outstanding Directorial Achievement in Comedy	Jerry Paris	Nominated
Outstanding Writing Achievement in Comedy	Bill Persky and Sam Denoff for "Coast to Coast Big Mouth"	Won
Outstanding Writing Achievement in Comedy	Bill Persky and Sam Denoff for "The Ugliest Dog in the World"	Nominated

== Cast reunions ==
- In a special that was first broadcast on April 13, 1969, Van Dyke and Moore reunited for a one-hour variety special called Dick Van Dyke and the Other Woman. The program included a never-before-seen alternative take from one of the show's episodes in which Rob Petrie breaks down and cries after being dismissed from a film role.
- A 1979 episode of The Mary Tyler Moore Hour featured Van Dyke and Moore reprising their roles as the Petries in a short sketch presented as the brainstorming of Van Dyke (guest-starring as himself) and the writers of Mary McKinnon's (Moore) variety series, who noted McKinnon's resemblance to "the gal who played Laura Petrie".
- In a 1995 episode of the sitcom Mad About You, Carl Reiner reprised the role of Alan Brady, appearing in a documentary by Paul Buchman (Paul Reiser) about the early days of television. The episode included several other references to The Dick Van Dyke Show, including the epilogue in which Reiner and Reiser discuss whether it would be funnier to trip over an ottoman or to step over it and sit at the last moment. Brady then notes that "sitting has never been funny".
- In 2003 TV Land produced The Alan Brady Show, an animated special that was a spin-off of Dick Van Dyke. The story showed that the show-within-a-show was still on the air with a new team of writers. Reiner reprised his role as Alan Brady; Van Dyke and Rose Marie also contributed voice performances to the show, but as Mel Cooley and receptionist Marge, rather than their original characters.
- A 2004 reunion special, The Dick Van Dyke Show Revisited, brought together the surviving members of the cast. In this continuation, hosted by Ray Romano, Rob and Laura have long since moved to Manhattan, where Laura runs a dance studio. Ritchie has recently bought their old New Rochelle home, widowed neighbor Millie Helper finds a companion in Rob's brother Stacey, and Alan Brady re-enters their lives to ask Rob to write his eulogy, with the help of a happily married Sally Rogers Glimscher.

== Home media ==
Image Entertainment has released all five seasons of The Dick Van Dyke Show on DVD in Region 1. Season sets were released between October 2003 and June 2004. Also, on May 24, 2005, Image Entertainment repackaged the discs from the individual season sets into a complete series box set. On Blu-ray, the complete series, remastered in high definition, was released on November 13, 2012.

In Region 2, Revelation Films has released the first two seasons on DVD in the UK.

In Region 4, Umbrella Entertainment has released the first three seasons on DVD in Australia.

Following the well-received colorizations of I Love Lucy in the US, two episodes, "That’s My Boy" and "Coast to Coast Big Mouth", were computer colorized by West Wing Studios in 2016 and broadcast by CBS. They were later released on DVD and Blu-ray by CBS Home Entertainment as The Dick Van Dyke Show: Now in Living Color!

DVD name	Ep#	Release date
Season 1	31	October 21, 2003
Season 2	33	October 21, 2003
Season 3	31	February 24, 2004
Season 4	32	April 27, 2004
Season 5	31	June 29, 2004
The Complete Series	158	May 24, 2005 (DVD); November 13, 2012 (Blu-ray); November 10, 2015 (remastered DVD)
Now in Living Color!	2	March 3, 2017 (DVD and Blu-ray)

Six episodes of the series, all from the second season, are believed to have lapsed into the public domain and have been released by numerous discount distributors. There also seems to be no original record of copyright for episodes 33–62, which were released in 1962 and 1963. This does not preclude their creators from claiming royalties for them. CBS policy has generally been to claim indirect copyright on such episodes by claiming them as derivative works of earlier episodes that were copyrighted.

- "Never Name a Duck"
- "Bank Book 6565696"
- "Hustling the Hustler"
- "The Night the Roof Fell In"
- "A Man's Teeth Are Not His Own"
- "Give Me Your Walls"

== In popular culture ==
- In 1999, a Season 6 episode of The X-Files, titled Arcadia, has FBI Agents Mulder and Scully go undercover as a married couple with the names Rob and Laura Petrie.
- In 2003, TV Land produced a pilot for an animated TV series, The Alan Brady Show, based on the fictional show-within-a-show on The Dick Van Dyke Show. Written and executive-produced by Carl Reiner, it was scheduled to air on August 17, 2003, and featured the voices of Rose Marie as "The Secretary" and Dick Van Dyke as "Webb", with Reiner reprising his role as Alan Brady.
- "Holy Crap", the second episode of the second season of the animated TV series Family Guy, first broadcast on September 30, 1999, features a parody of the opening of The Dick Van Dyke Show where Rob Petrie (Dick Van Dyke) falls over an ottoman. In the parody, Petrie has a series of progressively more serious and dangerous accidents, until someone finally turns the TV off. In "PTV", the 14th episode of season four, first broadcast on November 6, 2005, the Federal Communications Commission censors the opening credits of The Dick Van Dyke Show, blacking out both "Dick" and "Dyke", because of their alternate meanings of "penis" and "lesbian".
- Dick Van Dyke Show opener parody (animated): Tiny Toon Adventures, Season 1, Episode 62 "Here's Hamton"
- Carl Reiner appears as Alan Brady in the episode "The Alan Brady Show" of the sitcom Mad About You, in which Paul hopes to hire Alan Brady to narrate his documentary about the history of American television.
- The first episode of the Disney+ series WandaVision acknowledges the ottoman gag in its opening sequence, with Vision avoiding tripping over a chair in the living room. It was later confirmed in episode 8 that the pilot episode was based on The Dick Van Dyke Show and the Maximoffs are seen watching the episode "It May Look Like a Walnut." When the producers of WandaVision (Matt Shakman and Kevin Feige) were making the first episode, they consulted Van Dyke for advice about keeping the episode as authentic as possible.

== See also ==
- The New Dick Van Dyke Show
- The Mary Tyler Moore Show
