= Previously On =

- WandaVision episode
- Wanda Maximoff (L) creates Vision (R) in a sequence created by visual effects vendor Industrial Light & Magic; inspiration was taken from a scene in Avengers: Age of Ultron (2015) where Maximoff's magic comes directly from her chest and heart.
- Episode no.: Episode 8
- Directed by: Matt Shakman
- Written by: Laura Donney
- Cinematography by: Jess Hall
- Editing by: Nona Khodai
- Original release date: February 26, 2021
- Running time: 46 minutes

Cast
- Julian Hilliard as Billy; Jett Klyne as Tommy; Josh Stamberg as Tyler Hayward; David Payton as John Collins; David Lengel as Harold Proctor; Amos Glick as a pizza delivery man; Selena Anduze as Agent Rodriguez; Kate Forbes as Evanora Harkness; Ilana Kohanchi as Iryna Maximoff; Daniyar as Olek Maximoff; Michaela Russell as young Wanda; Gabriel Gurevich as young Pietro

Episode chronology
| ← Previous "Breaking the Fourth Wall" | Next → "The Series Finale" |

"Previously On" is the eighth episode of the American television miniseries WandaVision, based on Marvel Comics featuring the characters Wanda Maximoff / Scarlet Witch and Vision. It follows Maximoff and Agatha Harkness as they explore Maximoff's past to see what led her to create an idyllic suburban life in the town of Westview, New Jersey. The episode is set in the Marvel Cinematic Universe (MCU), sharing continuity with the films of the franchise. It was written by Laura Donney and directed by Matt Shakman.

Paul Bettany and Elizabeth Olsen reprise their respective roles as Vision and Wanda Maximoff from the film series, with Debra Jo Rupp and Kathryn Hahn (Harkness) also starring. Development began by October 2018, and Shakman joined in August 2019. The episode explores Maximoff's history of grief to explain the events of earlier episodes, and also retcons the source of her abilities from the films. The episode is the first time in the MCU that Maximoff is referred to by her comic book alias "Scarlet Witch". Filming took place in the Atlanta metropolitan area in Atlanta, Georgia, including at Pinewood Atlanta Studios, and in Los Angeles. Visual effects were required for sequences such as the backstory of Harkness, the disassembled body of Vision, and Maximoff's creation of the series' sitcom reality and new version of Vision.

"Previously On" was released on the streaming service Disney+ on February 26, 2021. Critics highlighted the performances of Hahn, Olsen, and Bettany, particularly a scene between Olsen and Bettany discussing grief, as well as the backstory and the reveal of the "Scarlet Witch" title. It received several accolades, including two Primetime Emmy Award nominations.

== Plot ==
In Salem, 1693, Agatha Harkness is put on trial by a coven of witches led by her mother Evanora for practicing dark magic. As they attempt to kill Agatha, she absorbs their magic and drains the life from them.

In the present day, Harkness interrogates Wanda Maximoff, demanding to know how she is controlling Westview. Harkness forces Wanda to relive key moments in her life, including when she and her brother Pietro were trapped in the rubble next to an unexploded bomb the day their parents died. In this memory, Harkness deduces that Maximoff was born a witch who engaged in basic hex magic as a child as seen when Wanda inadvertently uses a simple probability hex to prevent the bomb from going off.

In the next memory, Maximoff watches as she is experimented on by Hydra using the Mind Stone. When she approached the stone it reacted to her presence, showing her a vision of an apparition inside the Mind Stone. Harkness suggests that the stone augmented Maximoff's latent magical abilities, which otherwise would have gone undiscovered. Maximoff then relives a fond memory of Vision when they lived at the Avengers Compound, discussing grief and bonding over sitcoms.

After Vision's death, Maximoff visited S.W.O.R.D. to recover his body. Director Tyler Hayward showed her the disassembled remains but refused to hand Vision over. Maximoff drove to a dilapidated lot in Westview that Vision had bought for them, intending to live there together. Overwhelmed with grief, she used her powers to create a house on the lot, manifest a new version of Vision, and extended her spell across the entire town, turning it into the style of a black-and-white, 1950s sitcom. (Note: This style is how the series' first episode, "Filmed Before a Live Studio Audience", is presented.)

After reliving these memories, Wanda hears her children Billy and Tommy crying for help. She finds them being held captive by Harkness, who mocks Maximoff for not knowing the full extent of her own abilities and using them to create a sitcom-style fantasy world in Westview. Harkness explains that Maximoff has been using powerful chaos magic, which makes her the mythical "Scarlet Witch". In a mid-credits scene, Hayward uses Maximoff's energy to activate the reassembled, all-white body of the original Vision.

== Production ==
=== Development ===
By October 2018, Marvel Studios was developing a limited series starring Elizabeth Olsen's Wanda Maximoff and Paul Bettany's Vision from the Marvel Cinematic Universe (MCU) films. In August 2019, Matt Shakman was hired to direct the miniseries. He and head writer Jac Schaeffer executive produced alongside Marvel Studios' Kevin Feige, Louis D'Esposito, and Victoria Alonso. Feige described the series as part "Marvel epic", part sitcom, that paid tribute to many eras of American sitcoms. The eighth episode was written by Laura Donney, and is titled "Previously On". This title reflects the episode's structure and its exploration of Maximoff's past life.

=== Writing ===
Part of healing from trauma is sometimes having to go places in your soul and heart and mind that are hard and painful and that you'd rather not look at. We had Wanda literally visit these places [with magic in the episode].

— Writer Laura Donney on the episode's approach to exploring Wanda Maximoff's grief and trauma

Schaeffer described "Previously On" as a "therapy episode" that explores Maximoff's grief. Her overall goal for the series was to allow Maximoff to at least start processing all of her trauma from the MCU films, since they had never given her the space or time to do so, and this episode is dedicated to that process. They do this by having Maximoff literally re-live her traumatic memories with Agatha Harkness. Instead of just revisiting different moments from Maximoff's past, the writers wanted to spend time with Maximoff in each memory to give "space [and a] voice" to her grief. Donney acknowledged that Harkness does not have ideal motivations in the episode since she is acting selfishly, but she still serves the role of a therapist who says, "How did we get here? Show me. I'm listening. I'll go there with you." The writers felt it was important that Maximoff explore her past with someone else, even if it is an antagonist, because the episode is also about Maximoff "sharing her experience. It's testifying, in a way: being heard, being seen, being understood."

The episode begins with a flashback showing the backstory of Harkness, which went through a lot of iterations to balance the needs of Marvel in establishing Harkness in the MCU with the needs of the writers in exploring her character and explaining why she is who she is in the present day. It was Schaeffer's initial idea that the flashback depict a witch trial, but the specifics of the scene such as who was on trial and who was carrying out the trial changed throughout the iterations of the script. At one point, a younger version of Harkness would have appeared in the scene to create symmetry with the younger version of Maximoff seen later in the episode, but this idea was abandoned to keep the scene simple for the audience and to allow Hahn to portray the past version of the character. Despite this, Donney felt writing a child version of the character helped her develop the emotions of the scene since the experience of Harkness's mother trying to kill her would have a similar effect regardless of Harkness's age at the time. Donney noted that the scene contrasts Harkness's trauma and her mother's death with Maximoff's own parents' deaths later in the episode as a way to show how different trauma can affect people differently. The writers compared the sequence to the opening of the earlier episode "We Interrupt This Program" since it throws the audience into a new location and tone for the series.

One of the most intimidating scenes of the episode for Donney was the early scene in Harkness's basement where she introduces herself and her abilities to Maximoff and the audience, before beginning the episode's journey through Maximoff's memories. The specifics of this scene's exposition changed a lot during development, and Donney struggled with finding a clear way to explain the new magical concepts that it introduces. Schaeffer suggested that Harkness demonstrate magical spells on a cicada, which Donney found to be an effective device. The first memory that they visit reveals that Wanda's father sold bootleg DVDs of American sitcoms when she was a child. This helped form Maximoff's love of them, as was seen throughout earlier episodes of WandaVision. Sitcoms shown or referenced in the episode include The Dick Van Dyke Show and its episode "It May Look Like a Walnut", I Love Lucy, The Addams Family, Bewitched, I Dream of Jeannie, Who's the Boss?, The Brady Bunch and its episode "Kitty Karry-all Is Missing", and Malcolm in the Middle and its episode "Health Insurance". A later scene shows a memory of Maximoff and Vision discussing grief, which Shakman felt was the "center point" of WandaVision.

Ahead of the series' premiere, Feige said Maximoff's powers were never fully defined during the Infinity Saga, and the series would explore the true origins of her powers and how the Mind Stone unlocked them; "Previously On" confirms that Maximoff was born with her powers and they were just amplified by the Mind Stone, which was considered a retcon of Maximoff's backstory in the MCU. Phil Owens of TheWrap called this "huge" since all previous human superheroes in the MCU were believed to have been born without abilities, only acquiring them later on. Harkness calls Maximoff the "Scarlet Witch" in the episode, which Maximoff had not been known by in the MCU until this point. Commentators believed the "Scarlet Witch" name was more of an inherited title or lineage of witches, rather than a superhero moniker; recent versions of the character in the comics have also made this change. The appearance of S.W.O.R.D.'s white Vision was inspired by the character appearing as such in the comic book storyline "Vision Quest" by John Byrne.

=== Casting ===
The episode stars Paul Bettany as Vision, Elizabeth Olsen as Wanda Maximoff, Debra Jo Rupp as Sharon Davis, and Kathryn Hahn as Agatha Harkness. Also starring in the episode are Julian Hilliard as Billy and Jett Klyne as Tommy, Maximoff and Vision's sons; Josh Stamberg as S.W.O.R.D. Director Tyler Hayward; David Payton as John Collins; David Lengel as Harold Proctor; Amos Glick as a pizza delivery man; Selena Anduze as S.W.O.R.D. Agent Rodriguez; Kate Forbes as Evanora Harkness; Ilana Kohanchi as Iryna Maximoff; Daniyar as Olek Maximoff; and Michaela Russell and Gabriel Gurevich as young Wanda and Pietro Maximoff.

=== Filming and editing ===
Soundstage filming occurred at Pinewood Atlanta Studios in Atlanta, Georgia, with Shakman directing, and Jess Hall serving as cinematographer. Filming also took place in the Atlanta metropolitan area, with backlot and outdoor filming occurring in Los Angeles when the series resumed production after being on hiatus due to the COVID-19 pandemic. While filming the scene where Maximoff and Vision discuss grief, Bettany felt that Vision needed a line similar to one he says in Avengers: Age of Ultron (2015) about humanity. Schaeffer gave a suggestion that was adjusted by her assistant, Laura Monti, to get the final line: "What is grief, if not love persevering?" This line received widespread praise from audiences and critics when the episode was released. Editor Nona Khodai collected all of the available footage of Maximoff and Vision from the MCU films to reference when editing the series, which was especially useful for making sure that she was matching those films with scenes in this episode that weaved between them.

=== Visual effects ===
Tara DeMarco served as the visual effects supervisor for WandaVision, with the episode's visual effects created by SSVFX, Framestore, Mr. X, Industrial Light & Magic, The Yard VFX, Digital Domain, Cantina Creative, RISE, Rodeo FX, and capital T. Rodeo FX developed the visual effects for the Hex boundary, based on the magnetization of old CRT television screens when brought into contact with magnets. The boundary is depicted as red to reflect Maximoff's anger and to reinforce that it is a hard barrier, with reflections of the environment that can be seen during daytime for which Rodeo was inspired by reflective television screens. The look of Agatha's magic was developed by Framestore during work on the scene in this episode where she controls a cicada in her lair. The look of this effect was then used by other vendors who created Agatha's magic in other episodes of the series. DeMarco explained that they originally planned for Agatha's magic to just be a purple version of Maximoff's magic, but the texture was adjusted until they were comfortable with its appearance in the scene. The final look has more of a black, ink-like texture than Maximoff's magic to make it appear more evil, with Framestore trying to give it a "retroness and period authenticity" while aligning with the appearance of magic in the MCU films. The effect of the Scarlet Witch appearing in the Mind Stone and being reflected in Maximoff's eyes used footage of Olsen in costume and on wires that was filmed for the battle in the final episode.

Top: Concept art for the opening Salem sequence by Gaetan Borneuf featuring the colorful magic that was originally intended to be used. Bottom: Final shot with blue magic visual effects added by Mr. X.

Perception, who created the end credits sequence for the series, also created a new Marvel Studios logo for this episode that transitions from the normal Marvel Studios logo into the purple smoke that Perception had used for the Agatha All Along sequence in the previous episode, since this episode begins with Agatha's backstory in Salem. Perception also created an onscreen locator card for the Salem setting that included a "witchy spin" as well as more of the purple smoke. The Salem scene itself was handled by Mr. X, who spent eight months developing the design and approach for the sequence and then another two months completing it as well as the coven scene in the final episode that revisits this scene's characters and location. The witches' magic was developed with Marvel and DeMarco, while the effect of the "mummification" or "desiccation" of the witches was designed by Mr. X concept artist Gaetan Borneuf based on a similar effect that happens to the character Walter Donovan in Indiana Jones and the Last Crusade (1989). DeMarco had shown that scene to Mr. X at the start of the project in April 2020 as reference material. Mr. X was asked to make the sequence "dark and scary but not too dark for [the] family friendly audience". The focus for the vendor was balancing the resolution needed for the sequence with the large amount of particle effects that were required for the magic, with different elements of the shots needing to be rendered separately. The scene was filmed with interactive lighting that was meant to represent different colored magic for each of the witches, but the effects team found that this distracted too much from the storytelling and changed it to blue magic for the whole coven. This helped differentiate from Agatha's purple magic.

DeMarco used Vision's introduction in Avengers: Age of Ultron as the definitive version of the character when approaching the visual effects for him in WandaVision. Bettany wore a bald cap and face makeup on set to match Vision's color, as well as tracking markers for the visual effects teams to reference. Complex 3D and digital makeup techniques were then used to create the character, with sections of Bettany's face replaced with CGI on a shot-by-shot basis; the actor's eyes, nose, and mouth were usually the only elements retained. SSVFX was the primary vendor for Vision in this episode, including the sequence where Maximoff sees his disassembled body. The scene was filmed with several mannequin body parts as well as Bettany lying on a table. SSVFX were tasked with designing the character's look for the sequence, needing to make the different pieces look like they belonged to Vision while also creating a design for his insides. They took the mixture of technology and lights that were briefly shown in Avengers: Infinity War (2018) when Thanos rips the Mind Stone from Vision's head and used that as the basis of the approach, designing and building the character from the ground up with skeletal, circulatory, respiratory, nervous, and muscular systems. SSVFX effects supervisor Ed Bruce described the digital model that they created as "quite an asset with lots and lots of feet of fibre-optic cables". The reveal of White Vision at the end of the episode was handled by Digital Domain, who developed the model and approach for that character for the final episode.

DeMarco listed Maximoff's creation of Vision in the episode as one of the most challenging visual effects of the series. She explained that the sequence took inspiration from Avengers: Age of Ultron where a heartbroken Maximoff destroys a group of Ultron robots; in both scenes, the majority of her magic comes out of her chest to show that "the power is coming from her heart". Olsen was filmed on a green screen for the sequence and is the only real element for much of it. ILM created a digital version of the house based on a scan and reference photographs taken from the series' 1950s house set, and then built the internal structure of the house based on actual 1950s building elements. Each part of the house was a separate object to allow for it to be taken apart and then formed together on screen. The pieces initially form into sections inspired by the "tetris/jigsaw 3D block" artwork from the "House of M" comic book storyline by Brian Michael Bendis and Olivier Coipel, before these move into their final placements to form the house. ILM then added the effects for Maximoff's chaos magic, the look for which was designed by Digital Domain for the series' final episode. The magic was given guide curves that the animators could use to direct the flow, with particles then generated around those curves. The energy that Vision is created from is yellow to match the power of the Mind Stone which powers the character, and it first forms his "monofilament fine circuitry" in an effect that reflects the look of Vision's death in Avengers: Infinity War. Shakman wanted the creation of the character to be "delicate" since it is a "beautiful creation of her love". To create the environment of Westview that can be seen around the house, which was based on location shooting at Blondie Street at the Warner Bros. Ranch in Burbank, California, ILM used a mixture of 3D and 2.5D projections of reference photography from the location.

=== Music ===
A soundtrack album for the episode was released digitally by Marvel Music and Hollywood Records on March 5, 2021, featuring composer Christophe Beck's score. An additional track, "Family TV Night", was released as a digital single on April 9 after Beck had regretted his decision to leave it off the album and worked with Marvel to get it released.

WandaVision: Episode 8 (Original Soundtrack)
| No. | Title | Length |
|---|---|---|
| 1. | "Salem" | 1:40 |
| 2. | "Witchnapped" | 4:49 |
| 3. | "Sokovia" | 2:10 |
| 4. | "War Zone" | 4:30 |
| 5. | "The Mind Stone" | 2:29 |
| 6. | "What Is Grief" | 3:53 |
| 7. | "Some Assembly Required" | 2:41 |
| 8. | "Genesis" | 6:07 |
| 9. | "Ready for Launch" | 1:24 |
| 10. | "Wanda and Vision (Love Theme from WandaVision)" | 2:32 |
| Total length: | | 32:15 |

== Marketing ==
After the episode's release, Marvel announced merchandise inspired by the episode as part of its weekly "Marvel Must Haves" promotion for each episode of the series, including apparel, Funko Pops based on Agatha and the white Vision (labeled simply as "The Vision"), and a Hasbro Marvel Legends figure of The Vision. In March 2021, Marvel partnered with chef Justin Warner to release a recipe for Salem Honeycomb Frappe, which was chosen as a representation of the episode because honeycomb has a "small-town sweetness" that is relevant to Salem while its hexagonal shape could represent the Hex, and frappes are a type of milkshake served in Massachusetts.

== Release ==
"Previously On" was released on the streaming service Disney+ on February 26, 2021. The episode, along with the rest of WandaVision, was released on Ultra HD Blu-ray and Blu-ray on November 28, 2023.

== Reception ==
=== Audience viewership ===
Nielsen Media Research, which measures the number of minutes watched by United States audiences on television sets, listed WandaVision as the second most-watched original streaming series for the week of February 22 to 28, 2021. 732 million minutes were viewed across the available eight episodes, the highest for the series at that point.

=== Critical response ===
The review aggregator website Rotten Tomatoes reported a 95% approval rating with an average score of 8.10/10 based on 22 reviews. The site's critical consensus reads, "Kathryn Hahn looms large and seriously in charge of her craft in 'Previously On'—thankfully Elizabeth Olsen proves more than up to the challenge with her own magnetic performance."

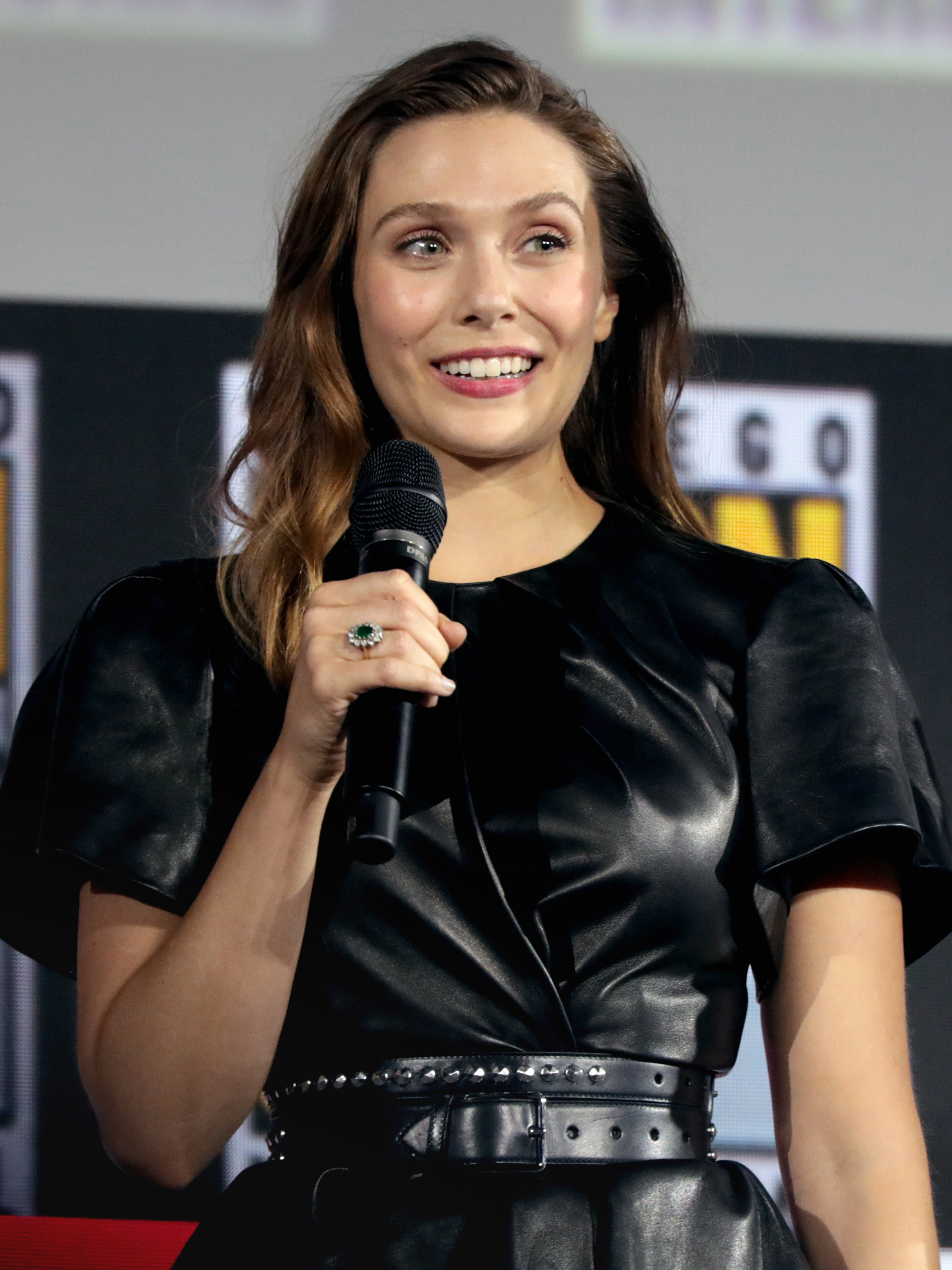
Elizabeth Olsen received praise for her performance in the episode

After being more critical of earlier episodes, Abraham Riesman at Vulture was enthralled with "Previously On" and gave it five out of five stars. He said it was everything he wanted from an MCU project, with a fresh and creative story filled with emotion, and it made him reconsider his thoughts on the series as a whole. Riesman praised the "what is grief" line from Vision, as did Ben Travers of IndieWire who said it was "such a powerful statement [and] such a succinct encapsulation of a profound feeling". Travers had similarly been more negative of earlier episodes but gave this one an "A−", praising the episode's "honest engagement" with Maximoff's grief and calling it an example of television being a healing experience. Jack Shepherd, writing for GamesRadar+, gave the episode 4 stars out if 5 and called it "the most traumatic clip show of all time". Despite finding the emotional scenes difficult to watch, Shepherd praised the intimate scene between Maximoff and Vision in Avengers Compound as his favorite of the series, and said Schaeffer had managed to avoid the trope of an "unstable powered woman" by exploring Maximoff's grief.

Reviewing the episode for The A.V. Club, Stephen Robinson gave it a "B" and said a character-driven episode before the finale could have been a "momentum killer" but was glad the series could explore Maximoff's motivations and answer some questions raised since her introduction in Age of Ultron. He positively compared the series' small details and symbolism to The Prisoner. Matt Purslow of IGN, however, criticized the episode for looking backwards rather than ramping up to the finale. Though he found some scenes to have emotional merit, for the most part he saw the episode as a recap of events that fans already knew. Purslow gave the episode a 6 out of 10. Paul Bradshaw at NME and Christian Holub at Entertainment Weekly both felt "Previously On" left too many questions unanswered despite being focused on answering the series' questions. Holub's colleague Chancellor Agard wished the creatives found a more interesting way to present the flashbacks than a "memory palace with many doors", which he felt was conventional, but this did not detract from the emotions for him. In contrast, Den of Geek's Rosie Knight praised the skill of the creative team in how they moved between the different "worlds, moments, and atmosphere seamlessly" for the flashback sequences. Alan Sepinwall at Rolling Stone felt this sequence took advantage of the series' place within a shared universe by bringing together ideas from different films that were not necessarily originally meant to match each other.

Olsen received praise for her performance, with Knight explaining that Olsen sold "every tear, lip tremble, and horrified gasp" throughout the episode and helped to depict Maximoff as a more nuanced character than in the previous MCU films. Sepinwall likened Olsen's performance to her role in the Facebook Watch series Sorry for Your Loss, calling it "incredibly moving" and agreeing that the episode allowed her to explore the character in ways that the MCU films never did. He said the episode was effective because it took the pain of its characters seriously, and he believed that if Maximoff was to become a villain in the future of the MCU then she would be a "much more well-rounded villain, and one who feels far more complex than she's been allowed to be through her" previous appearances. Shepherd and Bradshaw both also noted how the series was developing Maximoff further than the previous films had time for, and Shepherd felt this episode "seal[ed] the deal" on Olsen's Emmy nomination after her already praised work recreating performances from different sitcom eras in earlier episodes. Hahn and Bettany also received praise for their performances in the episode.

Knight and Bradshaw both said the reveal of the "Scarlet Witch" title at the end of the episode was a big way for it to end, as did Riesman who loved the moment but felt it may be "slightly baffling" to viewers who were not aware of the character's comic book history. Purslow agreed, calling it an interesting ending but one that relied on prior knowledge of the comics that not all viewers would have. Holub was more critical, calling the ending "pretty weak" since "we all know [Maximoff's] superhero name!"

=== Accolades ===
Olsen was named TVLine's "Performer of the Week" for the week of February 22, 2021, for her performance in this episode, along with Lydia West for It's a Sin. The site admitted that Olsen had been worthy of their "Performer of the Week" for the entire series, and for "Previously On" they said her performance was "no less compelling, if tonally different, than her many weeks spent as a TV housewife". Olsen was able to portray her sadness in the episodes without saying many words, and her visit to Vision's corpse left an "indelible impression" on the site by proving that Olsen could "shatter us with her voice barely above a whisper" with her line "I can't feel you".

| Award | Date of ceremony | Category | Recipient(s) | Result | Ref(s) |
|---|---|---|---|---|---|
| Primetime Creative Arts Emmy Awards | September 11 – September 12, 2021 | Outstanding Music Composition for a Limited or Anthology Series, Movie or Special (Original Dramatic Score) | Christophe Beck | Nominated | |
| Primetime Emmy Awards | September 19, 2021 | Outstanding Writing for a Limited or Anthology Series or Movie | Laura Donney | Nominated | |
| Hollywood Professional Association Awards | November 18, 2021 | Outstanding Color Grading – Episodic or Non-theatrical Feature | Matt Watson | Won | |
| Cinema Audio Society Awards | March 19, 2022 | Outstanding Achievement in Sound Mixing for Television Movie or Limited Series | Christopher Giles, Danielle Dupre, Casey Stone, Doc Kane and Frank Rinella | Nominated | |
