= The Series Finale =

- WandaVision episode
- Promotional poster for WandaVision with an early look at sections of Wanda Maximoff's new Scarlet Witch costume, which is introduced in full in this episode
- Episode no.: Episode 9
- Directed by: Matt Shakman
- Written by: Jac Schaeffer
- Cinematography by: Jess Hall
- Editing by: Zene Baker; Michael A. Webber
- Original release date: March 5, 2021
- Running time: 50 minutes

Cast
- Julian Hilliard as Billy; Jett Klyne as Tommy; Josh Stamberg as Tyler Hayward; Asif Ali as Abilash Tandon; Emma Caulfield Ford as Sarah Proctor; Jolene Purdy as Isabel Matsueda; David Payton as John Collins; David Lengel as Harold Proctor; Amos Glick as the delivery man; Selena Anduze as Agent Rodriguez; Kate Forbes as Evanora Harkness; Lori Livingston as the Skrull agent

Episode chronology
← Previous "Previously On"	Next → —

"The Series Finale" is the ninth episode and series finale of the American television miniseries WandaVision, based on Marvel Comics featuring the characters Wanda Maximoff / Scarlet Witch and Vision. It follows Wanda as she tries to protect the idyllic suburban life and family that she created in the town of Westview, New Jersey. The episode is set in the Marvel Cinematic Universe (MCU), sharing continuity with the films of the franchise. It was written by head writer Jac Schaeffer and directed by Matt Shakman.

Elizabeth Olsen and Paul Bettany reprise their respective roles as Wanda Maximoff / Scarlet Witch and Vision from the film series, with Debra Jo Rupp, Teyonah Parris, Evan Peters, Randall Park, Kat Dennings, and Kathryn Hahn also starring. Development began by October 2018, and Schaeffer was hired to serve as head writer for the series in January 2019. Shakman joined that August. The series finale was designed as an MCU film-style conclusion with a large amount of fighting and visual effects, and it introduces a new Scarlet Witch costume. Filming took place in the Atlanta metropolitan area in Atlanta, Georgia, including at Pinewood Atlanta Studios, and in Los Angeles. The episode ends with mid- and post-credits scenes that respectively set up the MCU films The Marvels (2023) and Doctor Strange in the Multiverse of Madness (2022).

"The Series Finale" was released on the streaming service Disney+ on March 5, 2021. Critics praised the performances, visual effects, and payoff for the series' emotional arc, but had mixed reactions to the action-oriented climax and Peters' character reveal. It received several accolades, including three Primetime Emmy Award nominations.

== Plot ==
Agatha Harkness attempts to take Wanda Maximoff's chaos magic but is interrupted by the white, re-assembled, and re-animated Vision who attacks Maximoff, revealing S.W.O.R.D. director Tyler Hayward's orders to eliminate her. He is foiled by the version of Vision created by Wanda who fights with White Vision across Westview while Harkness continues to attack Maximoff. Harkness frees the residents of Westview from Maximoff's spell that trapped them in sitcom personas, and they implore Wanda to set them free.

Wanda opens the barrier, allowing the residents to escape, but her Vision and their sons Billy and Tommy begin to disintegrate. She closes the barrier again, but not before Hayward enters with multiple S.W.O.R.D. personnel. Monica Rambeau removes a magical necklace from "Pietro Maximoff", releasing him from Harkness's control and revealing his true identity as Ralph Bohner. Maximoff attempts to overpower Harkness with illusions of her past, but Harkness gains control and overpowers Maximoff. Using newly developed powers, Rambeau saves Billy and Tommy from Hayward, who is detained by Darcy Lewis.

Maximoff's Vision helps unlock the White Vision's memories, and the latter departs Westview. Harkness takes Maximoff's magic but does not realize that Maximoff has created magical runes around the barrier to prevent Harkness from using her own magic. Maximoff then reclaims all of her magic and becomes the Scarlet Witch. She traps Harkness as the sitcom persona "Agnes", and then takes her family home as she collapses the barrier. Maximoff and Vision put their sons to bed and then say goodbye, before Vision, the boys, and their house all disappear. Faced with the Westview residents that she has harmed, Maximoff makes peace with a sympathetic Rambeau and goes into hiding, vowing to better understand her powers.

In a mid-credits scene, Hayward is arrested while Rambeau is informed by a Skrull disguised as an FBI agent that a friend of her mother Maria wants to meet with her in space. In a post-credits scene, while studying the Darkhold in her astral form at a remote cabin, Maximoff hears her sons calling for her help.

== Production ==
=== Development ===
By October 2018, Marvel Studios was developing a limited series starring Elizabeth Olsen's Wanda Maximoff and Paul Bettany's Vision from the Marvel Cinematic Universe (MCU) films. In January 2019, Jac Schaeffer was hired as head writer of WandaVision. In August, Matt Shakman was hired to direct the miniseries, with Schaeffer and Shakman executive producing alongside Marvel Studios' Kevin Feige, Louis D'Esposito, and Victoria Alonso. Feige described the series as part "Marvel epic", part "classic sitcom", that paid tribute to many eras of American sitcoms. Bettany described the ending as an epic collision. Schaeffer wrote the ninth episode, which is titled "The Series Finale".

=== Writing ===
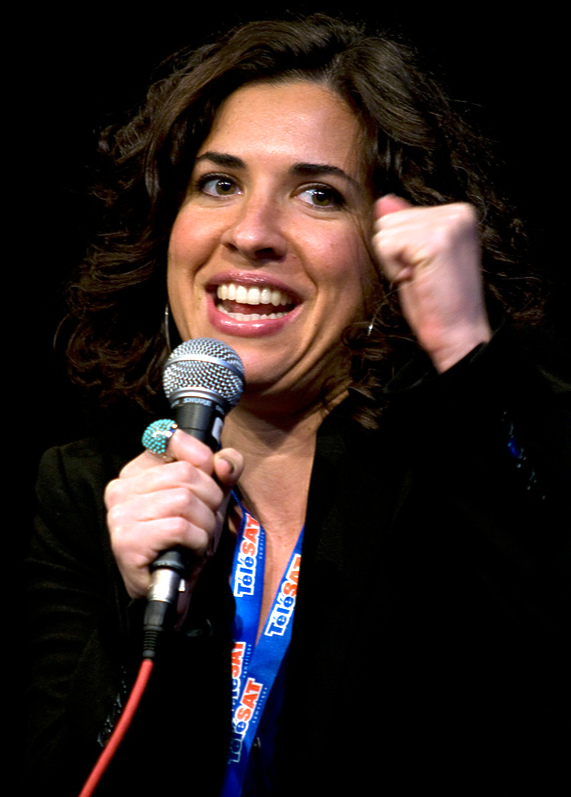
Series creator and head writer Jac Schaeffer wrote "The Series Finale".

Schaeffer's outline for the series combined sitcom elements with an MCU story, building up to a big finale that had the spectacle of an MCU film. Much of the final episode's elements were known from the beginning of writing the series, with some coming from Schaeffer's initial pitch. These included the involvement of the series' supporting characters, the fights between the two Visions and between Maximoff and Agatha Harkness, and the final goodbye between Maximoff and Vision after putting Billy and Tommy to bed and before Vision disappears. The rest of the episode was then fleshed out during development, with the COVID-19 pandemic forcing some further changes during filming. Schaeffer was glad that the goodbye scene between Maximoff and Vision remained in the final version of the episode, calling it the "heart of the show". The scene originally required Maximoff to release Vision by casting a binding spell that she learned from Harkness earlier, before Harkness was changed from a mentor to an antagonist. COVID-19 delays allowed Schaeffer to fine-tune the episode's logic, including adjustments to the action sequences.

Co-executive producer Mary Livanos pitched the idea of using the Darkhold to increase the level of danger Harkness poses to Maximoff. Harkness reads about the Scarlet Witch from the Darkhold and says Maximoff is destined to destroy the world. This prophecy originally had a larger role, with Maximoff having to overcome that destiny, but Schaeffer found this to be too restrictive for future MCU stories and decided to end the series with Maximoff not yet learning everything about her destiny and abilities. The sequence where Maximoff is confronted by the residents of Westview was originally envisioned as a "zombie attack" before being changed to a verbal attack from the residents. Shakman believed Harkness's line in this moment where she says "heroes don't torture people" was a "huge moment" for the episode that gave Maximoff something to contemplate.

Bettany portrays both Vision, created by Maximoff, and The Vision, the white body of the original character. These were differentiated in the script as "Soul Vision" and "White Vision", respectively. Bettany was apprehensive of playing The Vision due to the character's short arc and "big turn" within the episode; he differentiated the two versions by making The Vision familiar and intimidating. Schaeffer knew the fight between the two Visions would end in a logic battle, with series writer Megan McDonnell conceiving a conversation about the Ship of Theseus. The writers did not learn that there is a similar conversation about the Ship of Theseus between two versions of the Vision in the Avengers comics until after the episode was released. Shakman said the idea of identity was central to the episode's fights, with the two Visions discussing who the real Vision is while Harkness tries to tell Maximoff who she is. The latter fight ends with Maximoff deciding for herself to embrace the Scarlet Witch identity. Shakman said Monica Rambeau's role in the episode was constantly changing, with some versions giving her a larger role in the final fight than is seen in the episode.

Discussing Harkness being forced back to her "Agnes" persona at the end of the episode, actress Kathryn Hahn initially felt that this was not a punishment, believing that Harkness had been restless and lonely for a long time and this would allow her to relax and continue forming the companionships she made with some of the Westview residents. However, Hahn later stated that this was not how she felt and she was partially joking with the earlier comment, instead believing that Maximoff had essentially lobotomized Harkness. She added that, for Harkness, "to clip her wings and put her somewhere like that with boring people and not have anything to do. It's the worst, it's a nightmare." Maximoff's "walk of shame" through the town at the end of the episode was conceived to be "like an assault of death glares from people", with Feige requesting more from that moment so the audience could "understand that what she did was terrible". Schaeffer said Maximoff would most likely face consequences for her actions in the future, and did not want to end the series in a way where Maximoff's actions could be easily forgiven. Livanos enjoyed the "texture" the ending provided of the world possibly still labeling Maximoff as a terrorist. Schaeffer believed the series ended in a way for Maximoff to "say goodbye on her own terms" in order for her to "process everything she's been through and reach acceptance". Regarding the notion that Maximoff may have gotten off "too easy" by simply flying away from Westview, Olsen felt Maximoff had a "tremendous amount of guilt" and needed to leave before those who would hold her accountable arrived. Additional material filmed for this moment that did not appear in the episode would have helped clarify these points.

Schaeffer said the episode's end credits scenes were the biggest connective tissue between the series and future Marvel projects, and were being re-written until late in the process to make sure they covered what was needed for the hand-offs. This was done in discussion with the creative teams of the films Doctor Strange in the Multiverse of Madness (2022) and The Marvels (2023). The post-credit scene shows Maximoff studying the Darkhold as the Scarlet Witch in her astral form, indicating a passage of time and showing that she has reached self-acceptance. Schaeffer enjoyed the duality of the scene, with Maximoff "ruminating and reflecting" while her astral form functions at an unknown level. Whether Maximoff should hear her children in the scene or not was a topic of discussion. Andi Ortiz of TheWrap said this scene made it unlikely that Maximoff would become a villain in Multiverse of Madness since she was trying to control her powers, but Chancellor Agard of Entertainment Weekly felt the opposite, believing Maximoff was turning to the "bad side" to search for her children in the multiverse which would put her at odds with Strange. Dr. Stephen Strange was originally set to appear in the scene, with Benedict Cumberbatch reprising his role, to directly tie into his film Multiverse of Madness. This ultimately did not happen because the creatives believed Strange would have taken focus away from Maximoff and did not want the episode to be "commoditized to go to the next movie" or to have a white male showing Maximoff how to harness her powers. Schaeffer added that the scenes featuring the character never felt right to the writers and seemed "a little tacked on", while also presenting the question of where he had been for the rest of the series. Despite this, Olsen said the episode was a "complete tee-up" for Maximoff's appearance in Multiverse of Madness.

=== Casting ===
The episode stars Elizabeth Olsen as Wanda Maximoff / Scarlet Witch, Paul Bettany as Vision and The Vision, Debra Jo Rupp as Sharon Davis, Teyonah Parris as Monica Rambeau, Evan Peters as Ralph Bohner / "Pietro Maximoff", Randall Park as Jimmy Woo, Kat Dennings as Darcy Lewis, and Kathryn Hahn as Agatha Harkness / "Agnes". Also starring in the episode are Julian Hilliard as Billy and Jett Klyne as Tommy, Maximoff and Vision's sons; Josh Stamberg as S.W.O.R.D. Director Tyler Hayward; Asif Ali as Abilash Tandon; Emma Caulfield Ford as Sarah Proctor; Jolene Purdy as Isabel Matsueda; David Payton as John Collins; David Lengel as Harold Proctor; Amos Glick as the delivery man; Selena Anduze as S.W.O.R.D. Agent Rodriguez; Kate Forbes as Evanora Harkness; and Lori Livingston as the Skrull agent.

=== Design ===
The writers did not discuss the Darkhold's appearance in Marvel Television series such as Agents of S.H.I.E.L.D., where it had a different design, with WandaVision's creative team looking more towards how the book had appeared in Marvel Comics. Despite the new design, Shakman believed it was the same book that was seen in the Marvel Television series. Thomas Bacon from Screen Rant felt its appearance was a step towards dismissing the creative choices from the Marvel Television series. The Darkhold was designed by the Multiverse of Madness props team, since it reappears and has more screen time in that film, for the series to use ahead of reusing it for the film.

Maximoff spends most of the episode in her "sad sweats" costume from the previous two episodes. Shakman considered having her change into her Avengers superhero costume for the fight with Harkness, as she did for a scene in the episode "On a Very Special Episode...", but found it more satisfying in the finale to have the character be a "suburban mom fighting this witch". The end of the fight introduces a new costume for Maximoff when she takes on the mantle of the Scarlet Witch. This was designed by Andy Park of Marvel Studio's visual development team, and Rubeo worked with Ironhead Studios to create it. Shoemaking company Jitterbug Boy created the boots for the costume. The producers wanted the new costume to be more mature and less revealing than Maximoff's Avengers outfit, as Olsen had previously expressed concern over that "cleavage corset" costume. Olsen consulted on the new design, and adjustments were made to allow her to move and act how she needed to. Rubeo worked with the stunt coordinator to understand the technical requirements for the harnesses that Olsen needed to wear while doing wire work in the costume. There were two to four "hero" versions of the costume and then another two to three for Olsen to wear with harnesses, with two versions for Olsen's stunt double. The stunt versions had parts removed to allow for the harnesses.

Rubeo wanted Harkness's witch costume to be a dress made from 10 layers of fabric that were each a different color and texture, which she was able to show due to the wire work that Hahn does in the episode. Rubeo said this created a "Medusa"-like movement in the dress. Hahn had to wear a cooling suit underneath the costume to avoid overheating while wearing it outside during the 2020 California wildfires. Hahn also wears a brooch that she had in earlier episodes to hint at her character's true identity as Harkness.

=== Filming and editing ===
Soundstage filming occurred at Pinewood Atlanta Studios in Atlanta, Georgia, with Shakman directing, and Jess Hall serving as cinematographer. Filming also took place in the Atlanta metropolitan area, with backlot and outdoor filming occurring in Los Angeles when the series resumed production after being on hiatus due to the COVID-19 pandemic. Dennings' role in the episode was reduced as she was unable to return for filming in Los Angeles. The mid-credit scene was filmed on the final day.

Shakman originally filmed a sequence in which Rambeau, Bohner, and Lewis meet up with Billy and Tommy in Harkness's house and try to steal the Darkhold from the basement. Harkness's pet rabbit Señor Scratchy would have transformed into a demon, inspired by the transformations in An American Werewolf in London (1981), leading to a chase inspired by The Goonies (1985). Shakman felt this was a fun sequence, but he cut it from the episode because it was a big detour from the plot. Some visual effects work was completed before the scene was cut. Editor Zene Baker described editing the episode as an "all hands on deck" situation, with the series' other editors, Tim Roche and Nona Khodai, helping Baker work through all of the footage. Editing for the episode was completed two weeks before it was released; Baker had hoped to complete the episode earlier than this.

=== Visual effects ===
Tara DeMarco served as the visual effects supervisor for WandaVision, with the episode's visual effects created by Digital Domain, RISE, Industrial Light & Magic, Luma, Mr. X, capital T, Lola VFX, Weta Digital, Cantina Creative, and The Yard VFX. Digital Domain created the Hex boundary, using the magnetized CRT television screen design that was established in earlier episodes, including when Maximoff opens it which uses erratic-looking tears in the wall with a glitch effect. This causes Vision, Billy, and Tommy to start coming apart, which was inspired by imagery from the "House of M" comic book storyline by Brian Michael Bendis and Olivier Coipel.

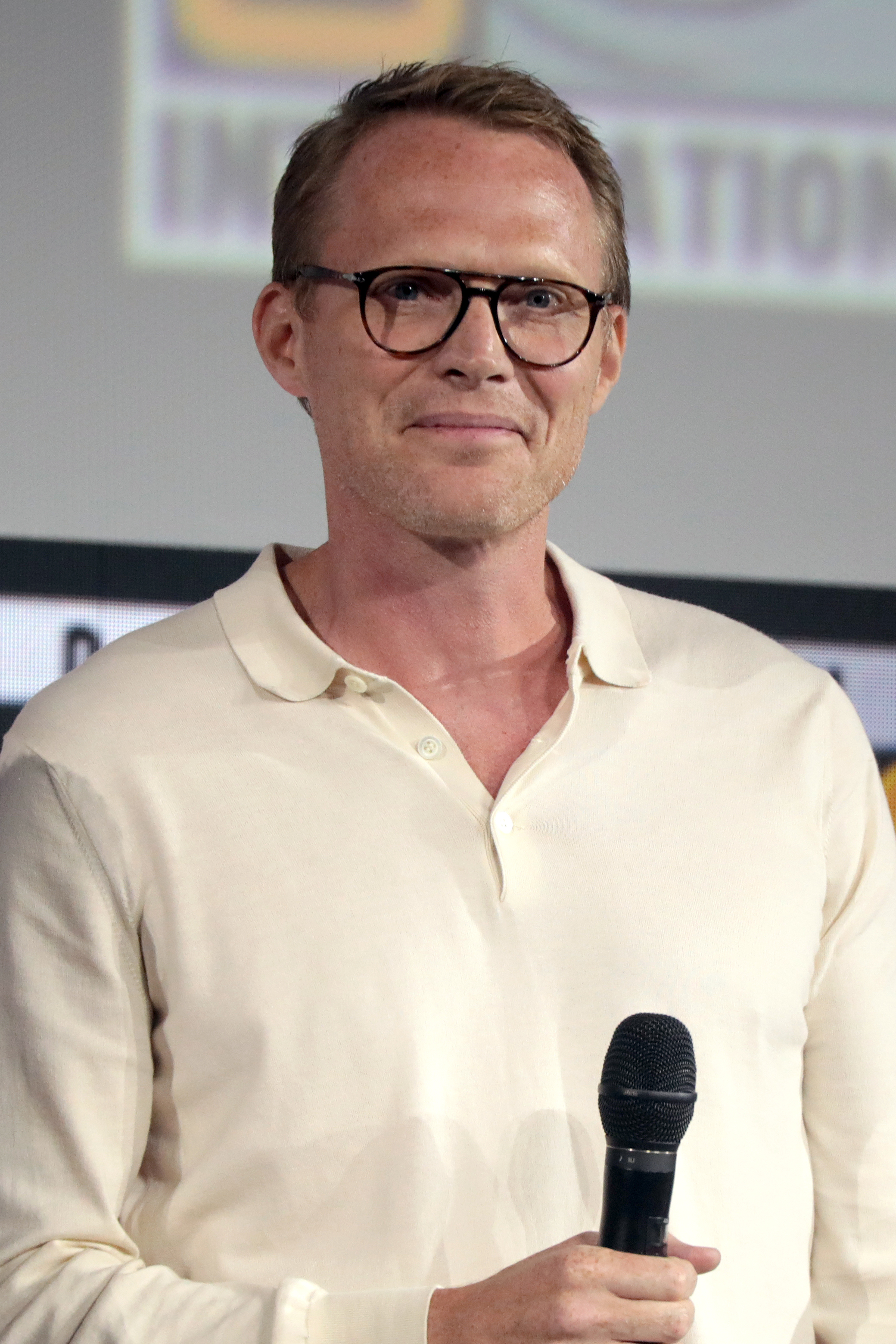
Paul Bettany portrayed both versions of Vision seen in the episode, with extensive visual effects required to create the two characters.

DeMarco used Vision's introduction in Avengers: Age of Ultron (2015) as the definitive version of the character when approaching the visual effects for him in WandaVision. Bettany wore a bald cap and face makeup on set to match Vision's color, as well as tracking markers for the visual effects teams to reference. Complex 3D and digital makeup techniques were then used to create the character, with sections of Bettany's face replaced with CGI on a shot-by-shot basis; the actor's eyes, nose, and mouth were usually the only elements retained. Digital Domain handled the Vision and White Vision fight sequences, including their fight over Westview and their confrontation in the library. They created fully digital versions of both the Vision and White Vision, with the model for Vision being based on the one used in Avengers: Infinity War (2018); the company did have existing models of Vision, but they were from Age of Ultron and were not up to the resolution required for the series. The model for White Vision had to be completely different due to the different design for the face panels and costume on White Vision from Marvel's design team; the character has more angular lines than Vision does. The digital model for Vision was then shared with other visual effects vendors for use in earlier episodes, while Digital Domain handled the reveal of White Vision at the end of the previous episode. Digital Domain artists were on set for the filming of the final episode to supervise scenes featuring the two characters, which were each filmed twice so Bettany could portray both versions. Bettany's stunt double Adam Lytle performed the scenes with him, having to learn all the lines for both characters. The visual effects team attempted to retain Bettany's performance as much as possible, in some cases completely replicating his performances on the faces of the digital models. Depicting White Vision in bright sunlight was a challenge, with the effects team having to be strategic with how white they made the character in certain shots. In some instances, they added a "thin film interference layer" that created a slight rainbow effect in front of the character and helped create some variation in the color of his costume. To complete the sequences, Digital Domain replaced the heads of stunt doubles in some instances, and added effects for phasing and Mind Stone beams as well as digital capes using cloth simulations. For the phasing effects, the vendor used a new "muscle transfer tool" that allowed them to automatically move muscle models between the two characters.

Digital Domain also handled the fight between Harkness and Maximoff. The cape and hood on Olsen's costume got in the way of her wire work harness, and there were also some leather straps on the costume that she found uncomfortable to maneuver in, so these were removed on set and Digital Domain added them back in post-production using cloth simulation effects. They also used cloth simulations to replace parts of Hahn's dress where it got caught on wires. The vendor developed the look of Maximoff's chaos magic, and went through over 100 iterations of what it might look like before settling on a darker, richer red than Maximoff's previous magic. They added more depth to her magic by creating a "planet element" with additional geometry inside the magic. Digital Domain originally were creating Harkness's magic to just be a purple version of Maximoff's, but ended up adjusting it to have a black, ink-like texture to match the design that was developed by Framestore for the previous episode. For the initial confrontation with Harkness at the start of the episode, Digital Domain replaced bluescreen background elements with a 2.5D matte painting that extended the cul de sac. For the main aerial fights in the episode, they created a digital environment based on plates that we shot at the Disney Ranch and Blondie Street as well as the town of Eatonton, Georgia, outside of Atlanta which inspired some of Westview's "small-town feel". Maximoff and Harkness's fight was originally intended to take place entirely in the clouds, but this was changed during production to include fighting around the town as Shakman wanted to connect the fight to the events in Westview. There were limited plates available of the town square from the Disney Ranch, so Digital Domain spent almost six weeks building a digital environment of the town square and some of the surrounding areas so the witches could fly around in it. When Harkness and Maximoff were both in the air, the Digital Domain team treated the camera as if it was being held by a third flying witch and made sure it moved within the 3D environment in the same way that the two characters did to create natural movements for the sequence. Full digital doubles of Maximoff and Harkness were used for some shots in the episode.

The coven scene where Maximoff is attacked by mummified witches was handled by Mr. X, who spent eight months developing the design and approach for the sequence and then another two months completing it as well as the opening Salem scene from the previous episode. Mr. X was asked to make the sequence "dark and scary but not too dark for [the] family friendly audience". The vendor hired more than 100 visual effects artists to complete the sequence in this episode within the short timeframe that they had to do it. Luma created the Darkhold for the episode, which supervisor Andrew Zink described as the introduction of the book to the MCU and something that the vendor wanted to do justice to. They created the book to appear as if it is made of metal and magical spark effects, and focused on the illustration of the Scarlet Witch that appears on one of its pages. They were then given the freedom to create designs for other pages seen in the episode, using the same design language as the Scarlet Witch image.

For the scenes where Maximoff says goodbye to her family, MARZ provided some of the effects for Vision. They completed that work after the 2020 Christmas break. The effect of Vision disappearing was created by ILM, and DeMarco listed it as one of the most challenging visual effects of the series. She explained that it needed to be "beautiful and lyrical and emotional, and also really cool-looking and technical", and the visual effects team took a lot of care to make sure the scene would still have an emotional impact. Three different shots were filmed for the moment, with a tracking shot moving toward the house as the boundary of the Hex closes in, as well as two different shots of the camera rotating around Maximoff and Vision inside the house. ILM merged the three shots to create a seamless transition, and then replaced Bettany with a digital version of Vision with the actor's performance replicated onto the 3D face. The digital model is broken up to reveal glowing wires and particles that swirl and dissipate, with some of these created in 2.5D so that they existed within the 3D environment but moved in relation to the plane of the camera. For the house environment, ILM used 2D techniques to wipe between different models of the house that represented the different sitcom decades seen in the series. At the end of the sequence, they broke up the house environment into particles and added "wispy creation magic". DeMarco said one of the most difficult parts of creating this effect was making it feel like it had been filmed on set and keeping the overall effect simple.

The post-credits scene's visual effects were updated by the end of June 2021 to include more trees around the cabin's location. Ethan Anderton of /Film said the change was subtle and strange, expressing concern that Marvel had the ability to go back to content they had released to make adjustments. He said this was "probably good for fixing little mistakes... but it also means they can make changes to their shows at any time without letting anyone know". Anderton speculated that if the cabin location was appearing in Doctor Strange in the Multiverse of Madness, the change could have been made to make the location match how it would appear in the film.

=== Music ===
Composer Christophe Beck referenced Michael Giacchino's main theme from Doctor Strange (2016) for the post-credits scene where Maximoff studies the Darkhold in her astral form. This had been requested by Shakman and Marvel Studios, but Beck also independently wanted to include the reference. It is heard on the track "Reborn", which was digitally released, along with the rest of Beck's score, as part of the episode's soundtrack album by Marvel Music and Hollywood Records on March 12, 2021.

WandaVision: Episode 9 (Original Soundtrack)
No.	Title	Length
1.	"Not a Witch"	1:58
2.	"Surrender Your Magic"	3:26
3.	"We Feel Your Pain"	2:38
4.	"I Am Vision"	3:07
5.	"Unintended Consequences"	1:53
6.	"Born For It"	2:12
7.	"I Want More"	3:22
8.	"Home Again"	3:43
9.	"Stand Down"	1:49
10.	"Ascendant"	2:41
11.	"What Am I"	5:12
12.	"Now Leaving Westview"	2:44
13.	"Reborn"	1:21
Total length:		36:06

== Marketing ==
In December 2020, a poster for the series was released featuring Maximoff and Vision standing behind several different televisions, with each screen displaying a different image from the series or showing the section of the actors' bodies behind the screen in a different costume from the series. Cooper Hood of Screen Rant noted that one of the screens in front of Maximoff's upper body depicted part of a costume that had not been seen in the MCU before, and wondered if the series was introducing a new Scarlet Witch costume. Several individual character posters were released for the series a month later, with the same format of televisions being in front of each character. On the poster for Maximoff, a screen in front of her torso revealed a different part of the new costume. Other commentators, including Nerdist and Molly Edwards of GamesRadar+, were surprised to discover the early costume reveal in these posters after seeing the new Scarlet Witch costume in full when watching the episode. Discussing the posters, Edwards stated that "the writing for Wanda's big transformation really was on the wall from the start." Also after the episode's release, Marvel partnered with chef Justin Warner to release a recipe for Westview Finale Snack Mix that was meant to represent many elements of the series mixing together for the final episode. Additionally, Marvel announced merchandise inspired by the episode as part of its weekly "Marvel Must Haves" promotion for each episode of the series, including apparel, toys, accessories, make-up, and jewelry.

== Release ==
"The Series Finale" was released on the streaming service Disney+ on March 5, 2021. Upon the episode's release at midnight PST, Disney+ experienced technical difficulties, mostly on the west coast of the United States, due to the influx of viewers attempting to watch the episode. The issues only affected approximately 2,300 users. The episode, along with the rest of WandaVision, was released on Ultra HD Blu-ray and Blu-ray on November 28, 2023. The release includes deleted scenes from this episode: one revealing that Ralph Bohner is Jimmy Woo's witness, and one with "Agnes" talking to the police while an in-universe laugh track plays.

== Reception ==
=== Audience viewership ===
Nielsen Media Research, which measures the number of minutes watched by United States audiences on television sets, listed WandaVision as the second most-watched original streaming series for the week of March 1 to 7, 2021. 924 million minutes were viewed across all episodes, the highest recorded for the series while it was being released.

=== Critical response ===
The review aggregator website Rotten Tomatoes reported an 88% approval rating with an average score of 7.70/10 based on 33 reviews. The site's critical consensus reads, "'The Series Finale' implodes WandaVision's intimacy in favor of bigger MCU bangs, and while it might not be the finale some fans were hoping for, it offers enough breadcrumbs to keep everyone guessing about the future of the multiverse."

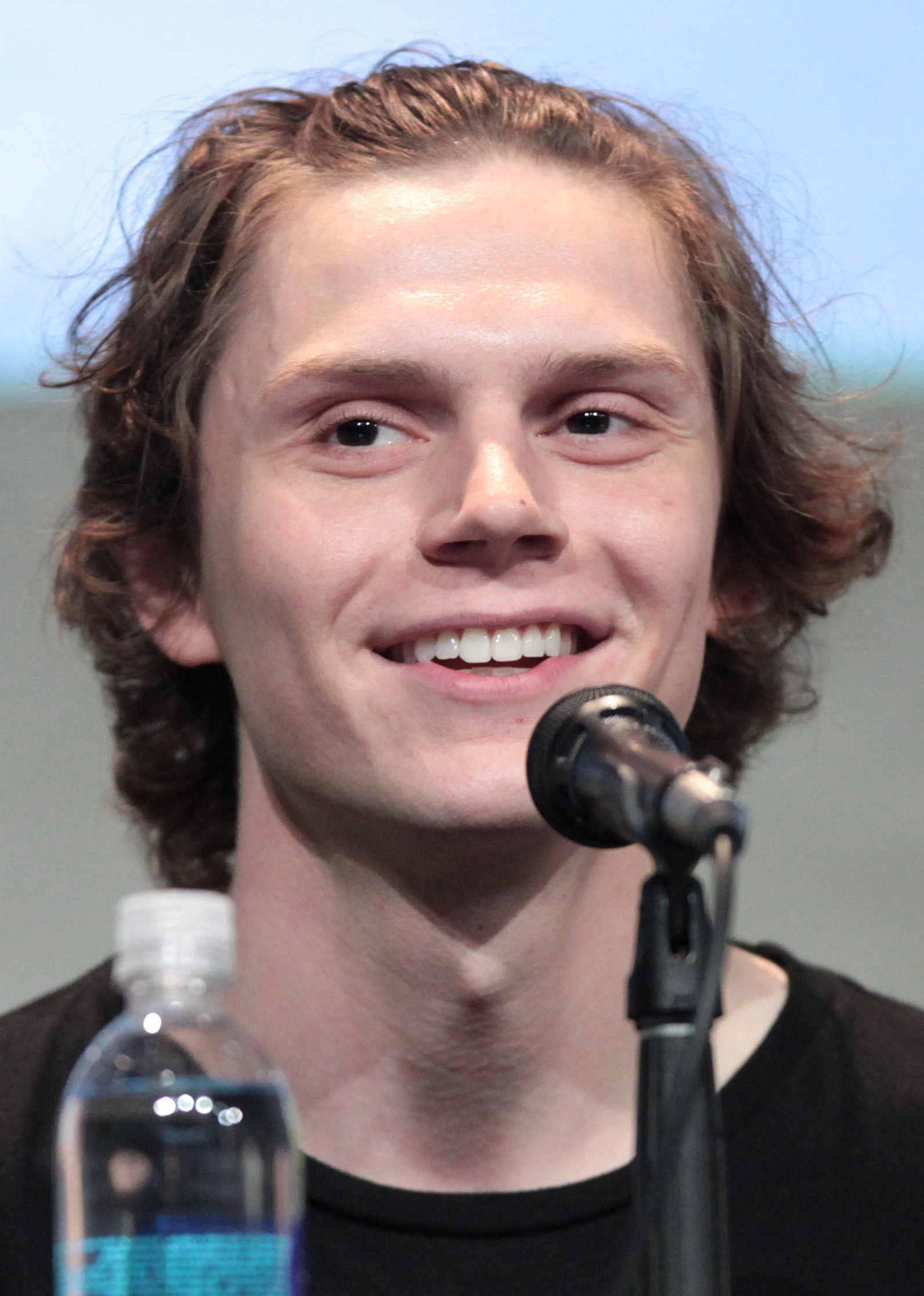
The reveal that Evan Peters' character in the series is an actor named Ralph Bohner received mixed responses from critics.

Vulture's Abraham Riesman felt the general outline of the episode could be mostly predicted from the start of the series, but "even though they stayed within standard thematic lines and introduced a bunch of dumb punching and blasting, and although the first seven episodes were varying degrees of 'meh'... they mostly stuck the landing". Riesman felt the WandaVision was about "what it's like to be in love at the end of the world", and gave the episode 4 out of 5 stars. Writing for Den of Geek, Rosie Knight stated, "for the most part, Matt Shakman and Jac Schaeffer do a solid job of tying up the many loose ends. While the pacing might be a little frantic at times, by the time the credits roll–and the delightful post-credits scenes surprises–you'll likely feel very satisfied by this experimental and emotional conclusion for a show that has been both of those things during its best moments." Knight added the scene between Vision and White Vision having a philosophical debate was one of the best of the MCU.

Giving the finale a 7 out of 10, Matt Purslow at IGN described it as "simultaneously unexpected and exactly what many foresaw... Despite a little unevenness, WandaVision's spell holds until the final moments, making for an enjoyable last outing with a wonderfully unusual couple." Purslow felt the reveal that "Pietro" was just a person named Ralph Bohner, after the stunt casting of Peters and prolonged mystery, was "something of an unfair trick from Marvel... as if fan investment in the multiple worlds of Marvel has been leveraged to create excitement for no payoff at all"; he likened it to the Mandarin twist in Iron Man 3 (2013) "but without the actual fun". He also felt Rambeau, Lewis, and Woo were all underutilized in the episode, with Lewis and Woo's storylines not given proper conclusions, but enjoyed the full display of Maximoff becoming the Scarlet Witch. Writing for The A.V. Club, Stephen Robinson gave "The Series Finale" a "B" and called it "a moving final episode that lands with only a few missteps". He enjoyed the final battle between Maximoff and Harkness, particularly the "badass scene" when Maximoff gains the upper hand, but had hoped for more complex motivations from Harkness than "simply craving power for power's sake". He also felt Hahn's less grounded portrayal made the character take a "sharp turn into grandiose Disney villain", but was excited by the prospect of seeing Hahn return as "an unpredictable Loki-style foil" for Maximoff. Unlike Purslow, Robinson did not mind the reveal that Peters' role was less substantial than some predicted, and found it refreshing that no "eleventh hour, last-minute Big Bad" appeared in the series. Conversely, he felt the weakest part of the episode was its action, which he described as "superfluous", and also felt cheated that "Dottie" is revealed to just be a woman named Sarah after her identity had been intentionally withheld earlier in the series when other Westview residents had been identified.

Alan Sepinwall, reviewing the finale for Rolling Stone, said "WandaVision concludes very much in MCU territory, a bit for good and more for ill". He continued by saying the episode "looks good, and it has some nice emotional moments. But where so much of the series leading to this point felt like a passion project for all involved, too much of the conclusion felt obligatory, as if the mandate was to return to formula and ensure that Wanda and Monica Rambeau are ready for their upcoming appearances in, respectively, the next Doctor Strange and Captain Marvel movies." He felt the supporting characters such as Rambeau, Woo, and Lewis were largely unnecessary, only a part of the series to "make the story feel linked to the MCU", but also felt that his issues with the episode might not be as strong if he had watched all the episodes at once rather than weekly. Chancellor Agard had mixed feelings on the episode in his review for Entertainment Weekly. Agard said Shakman and Schaeffer ensured there were moments to remind the audience that the series is about grief, such as when Harkness releases the Westview residents from Maximoff's control and when Maximoff and Vision say goodbye, and he also enjoyed the fact that Peters' casting turned out to be "a really fun piece of stunt casting". However, he felt the episode, which he gave a "B−", lost its emotional stakes in the fighting and spectacle, suffering from the superhero film cliché of having problems in their final act. For example, Agard noted that Maximoff and Vision fight evil reflections of themselves and also much of Hahn's dialogue is just exposition between energy blasts. Agard's colleague Christian Holub enjoyed the fight between Vision and White Vision more than Agard due to the "self vs. shadow self" trope, but agreed in regard to Harkness. Holub did enjoy Harkness being trapped as "Agnes", likening this to the finale of the animated series Avatar: The Last Airbender.

=== Accolades ===
Hahn was named TVLine's "Performer of the Week" for the week of March 1, 2021, for her performance in this episode. The site noted that Hahn had been receiving praise for her performance throughout the series and this was "well overdue" acclaim after being the "secret weapon" in past comedy series. In this episode, TVLine felt Hahn "relished every moment" of being a villain, with a performance that "oozed with wicked delight" and a "top-notch" witch cackle. They felt Hahn's best work of the series was when Harkness is trapped as Agnes, which "didn't have Agnes's previous cheerfulness, nor did they carry the gravitas of Agatha at the height of her powers".

Award	Date of ceremony	Category	Recipient(s)	Result	Ref(s)
Primetime Creative Arts Emmy Awards	September 11 – September 12, 2021	Outstanding Single-Camera Picture Editing for a Limited or Anthology Series or Movie	Zene Baker, Michael A. Webber, Tim Roche, and Nona Khodai	Nominated	
Primetime Creative Arts Emmy Awards	September 11 – September 12, 2021	Outstanding Sound Editing for a Limited or Anthology Series, Movie or Special	Gwendolyn Yates Whittle, Kim Foscato, James Spencer, Chris Gridley, Steve Orlando, Scott Guitteau, Jon Borland, Samson Neslund, Richard Gould, Jordan Myers, Luke Dunn Gielmuda, Greg Peterson, Fernand Bos, Anele Onyekwere, Ronni Brown, and Shelley Roden	Nominated	
Primetime Creative Arts Emmy Awards	September 11 – September 12, 2021	Outstanding Sound Mixing for a Limited or Anthology Series or Movie	Danielle Dupre, Chris Giles, Doc Kane, and Casey Stone	Nominated	
Hollywood Professional Association Awards	November 18, 2021	Outstanding Visual Effects – Episodic (Under 13 Episodes) or Non-theatrical Feature	Marion Spates, Suzanne Foster, R. Matt Smith, Simon Twine, Frankie Stellato	Nominated	
MPSE Golden Reel Awards	March 13, 2022	Outstanding Achievement in Sound Editing – Limited Series or Anthology	Gwen Whittle, Kimberly Foscato, Steve Orlando, Scott Guitteau, Jon Borland, Samson Neslund, Richard Gould, Anele Onyekwere, James Spencer, Chris Gridley, Luke Dunn Gielmuda, Fernand Bos, Tom Kramer, Ronni Brown, Shelley Roden, John Roesch	Nominated	
Cinema Audio Society Awards	March 19, 2022	Outstanding Achievement in Sound Mixing for Television Movie or Limited Series	Christopher Giles, Michael Piotrowski, Danielle Dupre, Casey Stone, Doc Kane and Malcolm Fife	Nominated	
