= Larry Mathews =

American actor (born 1955)

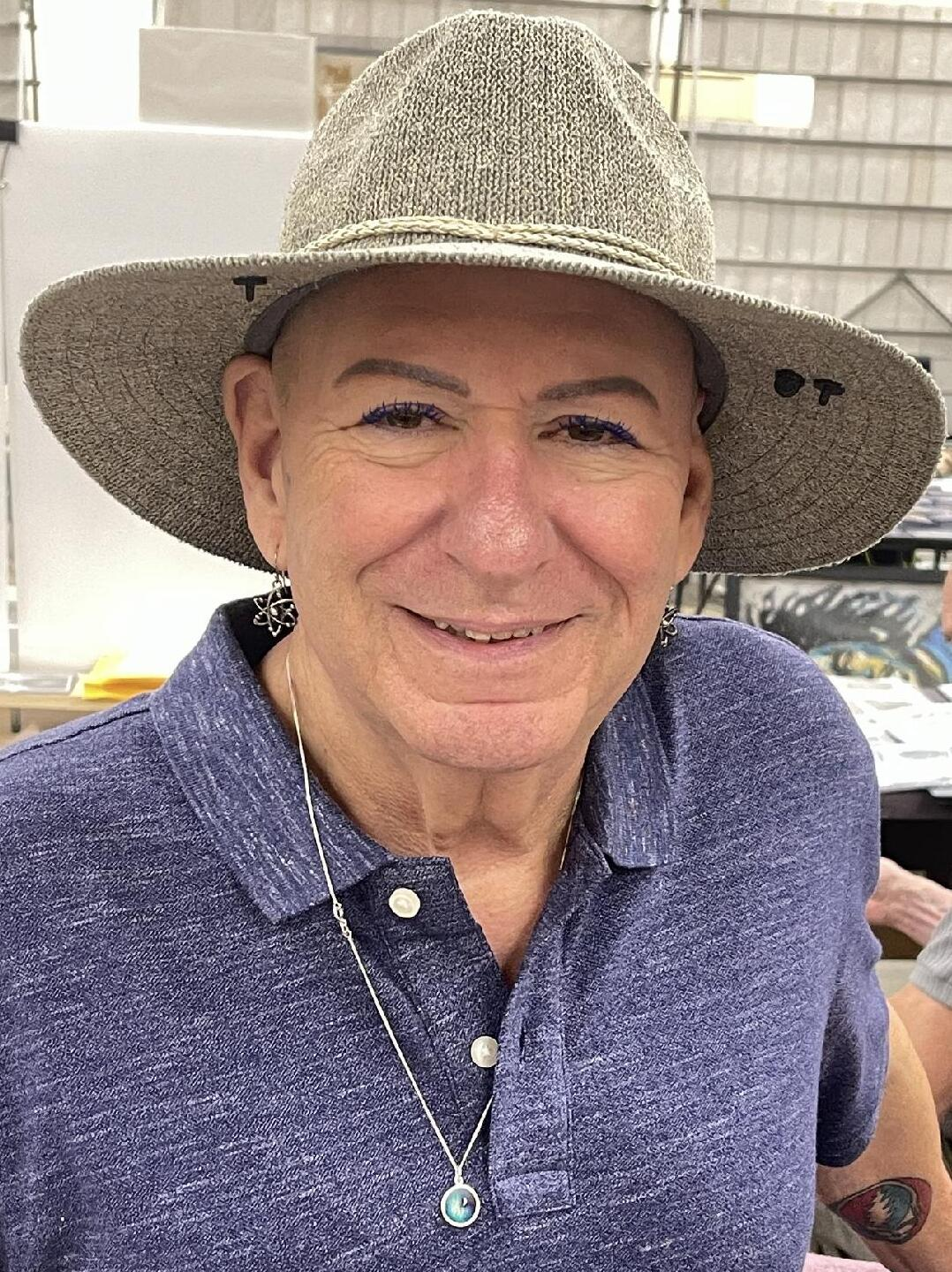
- Matthews in 2025
- Born: Larry Mazzeo; August 15, 1955 (age 71); Burbank, California, U.S.
- Education: University of California, Los Angeles
- Occupation: Actor

Larry Mathews (born Larry Mazzeo August 15, 1955) is an American actor known for his role as Ritchie Petrie on The Dick Van Dyke Show.

After the series ended in 1966, Larry Mathews left acting to pursue a more conventional childhood and graduated from the University of California, Los Angeles in 1976. He has worked as an account executive and appeared on numerous television programs to discuss his role on The Dick Van Dyke Show.

Mathews reprised the role of Ritchie on The Dick Van Dyke Show Revisited (2004).
