= All-New Halloween Spooktacular! =

- WandaVision episode
- Promotional poster for WandaVision highlighting elements of the late 1990s / early 2000s Halloween setting seen in this episode
- Episode no.: Episode 6
- Directed by: Matt Shakman
- Written by: Chuck Hayward; Peter Cameron
- Cinematography by: Jess Hall
- Editing by: Zene Baker
- Original release date: February 12, 2021
- Running time: 38 minutes

Cast
- Julian Hilliard as Billy; Jett Klyne as Tommy; Josh Stamberg as Tyler Hayward; David Payton as Herb; Alan Heckner as Agent Monti; Selena Anduze as Agent Rodriguez; Sophia Gaidarova as young Wanda; Joshua Begelman as young Pietro; Stephanie Astalos-Jones as toothless old woman; Adam Gold voices commercial shark; Tristen Chen voices commercial kid

Episode chronology
| ← Previous "On a Very Special Episode..." | Next → "Breaking the Fourth Wall" |

"All-New Halloween Spooktacular!" is the sixth episode of the American television miniseries WandaVision, based on Marvel Comics featuring the characters Wanda Maximoff / Scarlet Witch and Vision. It follows the couple as they try to conceal their powers while living an idyllic suburban life in the town of Westview, New Jersey. The episode is set in the Marvel Cinematic Universe (MCU), sharing continuity with the films of the franchise. It was written by Chuck Hayward and Peter Cameron and directed by Matt Shakman.

Paul Bettany and Elizabeth Olsen reprise their respective roles as Vision and Wanda Maximoff from the film series, with Teyonah Parris, Evan Peters, Randall Park, Kat Dennings, and Kathryn Hahn also starring. Development began by October 2018, and Shakman joined in August 2019. The episode pays homage to sitcoms of the late 1990s to early 2000s, specifically Malcolm in the Middle, and also to general Halloween-themed television episodes; the main characters dress in Halloween costumes based on the costumes from their appearances in Marvel Comics. Filming took place in the Atlanta metropolitan area in Atlanta, Georgia, including at Pinewood Atlanta Studios, and in Los Angeles.

"All-New Halloween Spooktacular!" was released on the streaming service Disney+ on February 12, 2021. Critics enjoyed the episode's comic book-accurate Halloween costumes and Peters' performance and highlighted a scene between Vision and Hahn's character Agnes. It received a Primetime Emmy Award nomination.

== Plot ==
In the fictional WandaVision program, now set during the late 1990s to early 2000s, Wanda Maximoff wants to spend Billy and Tommy's first Halloween together as a family. However, Vision says he is going to patrol the streets with the neighborhood watch. "Pietro Maximoff" offers to take the boys trick-or-treating, causing mischief with his super-speed, which Tommy is revealed to have inherited. Wanda questions why "Pietro" looks different, but he assures her that he is her brother. He later reveals that he knows Wanda is controlling the town, and he is okay with it. He continually asks Wanda how she did it, but she says she does not know. Meanwhile, Vision explores further away from their house and finds residents of Westview standing frozen in their positions, including Agnes. Vision speaks to Agnes's real self, and she tells him that he is dead and Wanda is controlling them. Vision restores her entranced state.

Outside Westview, S.W.O.R.D. director Tyler Hayward is preparing to attack Wanda, but Monica Rambeau, Darcy Lewis, and Jimmy Woo warn him against antagonizing Maximoff as it would only start a war they cannot win. The director orders them thrown out of the S.W.O.R.D. base for questioning his authority, but they sneak back inside to figure out what he is hiding. Hacking into Hayward's computer system, they discover that he has been tracking Vision's vibranium signature. They also find that he has Rambeau's bloodwork, which reveals that her cells are changing on a molecular level due to her going through the boundary twice. Lewis stays behind while Rambeau and Woo go to meet a friend to help Rambeau get back inside the Hex to help Maximoff.

Vision tries to push through the static wall but begins disintegrating. Lewis begs Hayward to help Vision, but she is handcuffed to a car. Billy senses that Vision is dying and tells Wanda, who expands the static wall. The new boundary restores Vision but also envelops Lewis and several S.W.O.R.D. agents and turns them into circus performers. Hayward, Rambeau, and Woo manage to flee.

A claymation commercial during the WandaVision program advertises Yo-Magic yogurt.

== Production ==
=== Development ===
By October 2018, Marvel Studios was developing a limited series starring Elizabeth Olsen's Wanda Maximoff and Paul Bettany's Vision from the Marvel Cinematic Universe (MCU) films. In August 2019, Matt Shakman was hired to direct the miniseries. He and head writer Jac Schaeffer executive produced alongside Marvel Studios' Kevin Feige, Louis D'Esposito, and Victoria Alonso. Feige described the series as part sitcom, part "Marvel epic", paying tribute to many eras of American sitcoms. The sixth episode, "All-New Halloween Spooktacular!", was written by Chuck Hayward and Peter Cameron, with the sitcom reality scenes paying homage to the late 1990s to early 2000s.

=== Writing ===
The episode specifically pays homage to the sitcom Malcolm in the Middle, as well as the fact that many sitcoms feature holiday-themed episodes such as ones for Halloween. Hayward and Cameron watched a lot of Malcolm in the Middle to "internalize the anarchic-but-comforting tone" of that series and also determine the types of jokes that best worked for it. The episode escalates from having "glitches" within the series' sitcom reality (the Hex) to a "Twilight Zone-level of horror", with Maximoff finally losing control of the situation. The episode is also a turning point for Vision, who decides to investigate the reality himself, and for Monica Rambeau, who decides to take matters into her own hands outside of the Hex. The writers found the scenes where Vision talks to Agnes and then leaves the Hex to be the two most difficult of the episode to write. For the Agnes scene, they wanted to hide the fact that she is pretending to be someone else, but they also wanted the audience to see a new side of her performance when re-watching the episode with that knowledge. When Vision leaves the Hex, they had to "walk the line between high stakes and gruesome" which Hayward felt was successful due to Cameron's "beautiful prose".

The series features fake commercials that Feige said would show "part of the truths of the show beginning to leak out", with "All-New Halloween Spooktacular!" including a commercial that advertises Yo-Magic yogurt, which was done in claymation and featured the tagline "the snack for survivors". Dais Johnson of Inverse said the commercial had a "Rocket Power-tinged aesthetic of Millennial youth", while Men's Health's Josh St. Clair compared it to ads for Go-Gurt and Kool-Aid that aired on children's television networks in the early 2000s. Abraham Riesman of Vulture said this was the weirdest commercial of the series so far, while Thomas Bacon at Screen Rant said it was "particularly striking" and felt it summed up the general theme of all the other commercials: "the idea that, for all her power, Wanda has been unable to drive back death itself". Schaeffer said the commercial was an outlier because it was more connected to an early idea that Dr. Stephen Strange would be using the commercials to contact Maximoff. Feige asked to keep it after the Strange concept was abandoned due to the imagery of a kid withering on the beach, and the concept was altered to represent Agatha "snacking" on Maximoff's magic.

=== Casting ===
The episode stars Paul Bettany as Vision, Elizabeth Olsen as Wanda Maximoff, Teyonah Parris as Monica Rambeau, Evan Peters as "Pietro Maximoff", Randall Park as Jimmy Woo, Kat Dennings as Darcy Lewis, and Kathryn Hahn as Agnes. Also appearing in the episode are Julian Hillard and Jett Klyne as Billy and Tommy, respectively, Maximoff and Vision's sons, Josh Stamberg as S.W.O.R.D. Director Tyler Hayward, David Payton as Herb, Alan Heckner as S.W.O.R.D. Agent Monti, and Selena Anduze as S.W.O.R.D. Agent Rodriguez. In the Maximoff's childhood flashback, young Wanda and Pietro are respectively portrayed by Sophia Gaidarova and Joshua Begelman, with Stephanie Astalos-Jones as the toothless old woman. Adam Gold and Tristen Chen provided the voices for the shark and kid, respectively, in the commercial.

=== Design ===
Shakman and cinematographer Jess Hall put together a collection of images from existing series that influenced the framing, composition, and color of the episode's sitcom setting, and Hall created a specific color palette of 20 to 30 colors for the episode based on those reference images so he could control the "visual integrity in color" of the episode. Hall worked with production designer Mark Worthington and costume designer Mayes C. Rubeo to ensure that the sets and costumes matched with his color palette.

Maximoff, Vision, "Pietro", and Billy all wear Halloween costumes inspired by their comic book counterparts' superhero costumes in the episode, while Tommy wears one similar to the costume that "Pietro" is wearing. It was Feige's idea to have the characters wear versions of their comic book outfits in the episode, and Olsen felt it was the perfect way to wear a comic-book accurate costume for her character since she felt you usually "can't take that costume seriously". Rubeo wanted the costumes to look like they could be made at home, and embraced elements from the comics such as bright colors and tights that she felt would be a nightmare if used for actual superhero costumes but were fun for the Halloween versions. Taking inspiration from the comics, makeup head Tricia Sawyer gave Olsen red lipstick to match with her Halloween costume, which she noted was bolder and more stylized than the character's usual makeup and played into the "ultra-revealing Wanda costume (with a suburban mom twist)" look that was a "sexy (for network) costume moment". "Pietro"'s hair style in the episode was created to be an intentional callback to the X-Men film series, in which Peters previously portrayed Peter Maximoff. Agnes wears a classic witch costume in the episode as a way to hint at the character's true identity, which is revealed later in the series.

Typeface used for the WandaVision program's opening sequence, inspired by Malcolm in the Middle

Perception, who created the end credits sequence for the series, also created the opening title sequence for this episode based on the opening of Malcolm in the Middle. It is meant to be a single shot filmed from Tommy's perspective with the family video camera, with Perception adding a filter to mimic the DV cameras of the early 2000s. They also designed the "fritzing type treatment" for the titles. Additionally, Perception provided graphics for the episode's fake commercial based on similar commercials from the 2000s.

=== Filming ===
Soundstage filming occurred at Pinewood Atlanta Studios in Atlanta, Georgia, with Shakman directing, and Hall serving as cinematographer. Filming also took place in the Atlanta metropolitan area, with backlot and outdoor filming occurring in Los Angeles when the series resumed production after being on hiatus due to the COVID-19 pandemic. The sitcom elements of the episode were shot as a single-camera comedy, and were the first of the series to feature characters breaking the fourth wall.

=== Animation and visual effects ===
Tara DeMarco served as the visual effects supervisor for WandaVision, with the episode's visual effects created by The Yard VFX, Monsters Aliens Robots Zombies (MARZ), Rodeo FX, RISE, capital T, Industrial Light & Magic, Cantina Creative, and SSVFX. DeMarco used Vision's introduction in Avengers: Age of Ultron (2015), which was primarily created by Lola VFX, as the definitive version of the character when approaching the visual effects for him in WandaVision. Bettany wore a bald cap and face makeup on set to match Vision's color, as well as tracking markers for the visual effects teams to reference. Complex 3D and digital makeup techniques were then used to create the character, with sections of Bettany's face replaced with CGI on a shot-by-shot basis; the actor's eyes, nose, and mouth were usually the only elements retained. MARZ created the sequence where Vision transforms into his full modern appearance from the films and flies over Westview, then approaches Agnes and the Hex boundary. The vendor built an entire digital town for the sequence based on specifications provided by Shakman, with the sequence being completely computer generated other than Bettany's eyes, nose, and mouth. This was the vendor's biggest and longest shot of the series after doing most of their work on the first three episodes, and they completed it on December 24, 2020.

Rodeo FX developed the visual effects for the Hex boundary, based on the magnetization of old CRT television screens when brought into contact with magnets. The boundary is depicted as red to reflect Maximoff's anger and to reinforce that it is a hard barrier. Rodeo was also responsible for the sequence where Vision attempts to leave the Hex and begins to disintegrate, for which they used a full digital double of the character that was created by Digital Domain for the series' final episode. DeMarco gave Rodeo FX freedom to explore different styles for the disintegration effect, but told them that it should not look like the Snap from Avengers: Infinity War (2018), the Quantum Realm from Ant-Man (2015), other dimensions from Doctor Strange (2016), or any of the force fields, holograms, or weapons seen in other MCU films. They settled on a pixel sorting design that takes a line of pixels from an image and sorts them based on criteria such as luminosity, hue, or saturation, creating a streaking effect. Because this is a 2D effect, they had to find a way to translate it into 3D space to give the streaks perspective and depth. Rodeo also added a moire pattern to the Hex boundary for the point where Vision exits it, and created strips of Vision's body that get broken off him by the Hex which they based on pixels and ash. A layer of cables and wires was generated under Vision's skin that becomes visible as pieces of him get broken off. Rodeo also built the car dealership that is consumed and transformed by the Hex at the end of the episode, which they named after their own company. DeMarco listed the disintegration of Vision and the transformation of the S.W.O.R.D. base into a circus as two of the most challenging visual effects of the series.

The gazebo in the town square was created digitally for this episode, since the episode's night filming was scheduled for after production on the final episode during which the actual gazebo set was destroyed. Some of the silly string in the Halloween scenes was also created digitally since there was not enough time during filming to clean it off the actors and set between takes. Animation was provided by Titmouse, Inc., while Acho Studios provided the stop-motion animation for the commercial.

=== Music ===
External audio
- Let's Keep It Going (From "WandaVision: Episode 6"/Audio Only) presents the full theme song from the episode by Robert Lopez and Kristen Anderson-Lopez, YouTube audio-only video from MarvelMusicVevo's channel

Theme song composers Kristen Anderson-Lopez and Robert Lopez found the 1990s to be the most challenging era to write a theme song for due to them both being at college during that decade when they did not have a television. Their song for this episode, "Let's Keep it Going", is an alternative punk rock track similar to "Boss of Me" by They Might Be Giants, the theme song for Malcolm in the Middle. It went through three different sets of lyrics, and was performed by Anderson-Lopez and riot grrrl artist Kathleen Hanna. Anderson-Lopez felt having Hanna perform on the track added an "incredible authenticity" to it. Since the episode shows things beginning to unravel for Maximoff, Lopez and Anderson-Lopez wanted the theme song to have a chaotic element to it and a feeling of alienation. A soundtrack album for the episode was released digitally by Marvel Music and Hollywood Records on February 19, 2021, featuring composer Christophe Beck's score. The first track is the episode's theme song written by Anderson-Lopez and Lopez.

WandaVision: Episode 6 (Original Soundtrack)
| No. | Title | Length |
|---|---|---|
| 1. | "Let's Keep It Going" | 0:56 |
| 2. | "Traffic Light" | 0:30 |
| 3. | "Fish to Share" | 0:15 |
| 4. | "Water Balloon" | 0:31 |
| 5. | "Chile Con Carne" | 0:33 |
| 6. | "Hayward's Secrets" | 2:08 |
| 7. | "Yo Magic" | 0:43 |
| 8. | "Frankenherb" | 1:01 |
| 9. | "Charming As Hell" | 0:46 |
| 10. | "Dead or Alive" | 4:51 |
| 11. | "Super Speed" | 0:42 |
| 12. | "Freeze Framed" | 0:56 |
| 13. | "Hexpansion" | 5:36 |
| Total length: | | 19:28 |

== Marketing ==
In early December 2020, six posters for the series were released daily, each depicting a decade from the 1950s through the 2000s. Charles Pulliam-Moore from io9 noted the comic-accurate costumes worn by Maximoff and Vision in the poster, and felt the lack of the previous posters' yellow light could indicate that Vision is "somewhat removed" from Maximoff's story. After the episode's release, Marvel announced merchandise inspired by the episode as part of its weekly "Marvel Must Haves" promotion for each episode of the series, including t-shirts, accessories, houseware, and Funko Pops of the characters in their Halloween costumes. In March 2021, Marvel partnered with chef Justin Warner to release a recipe for Full-er Size Halloween Candy Bars based on Billy and Tommy trick-or-treating in the episode and their quest to get giant candy bars.

== Release ==
"All-New Halloween Spooktacular!" was released on the streaming service Disney+ on February 12, 2021. The episode, along with the rest of WandaVision, was released on Ultra HD Blu-ray and Blu-ray on November 28, 2023.

== Reception ==
=== Audience viewership ===
Nielsen Media Research, which measures the number of minutes watched by United States audiences on television sets, listed WandaVision as the third most-watched original streaming series for the week of February 8 to 14, 2021. 596 million minutes were viewed across the available six episodes, slightly higher than the previous week.

=== Critical response ===
The review aggregator website Rotten Tomatoes reported a 95% approval rating with an average score of 7.60/10 based on 22 reviews. The site's critical consensus reads, "'All-New Halloween Spooktacular!' doesn't reveal too many cards, but offers much in the way of new treats to chew on—including some delicious work from Kathryn Hahn."

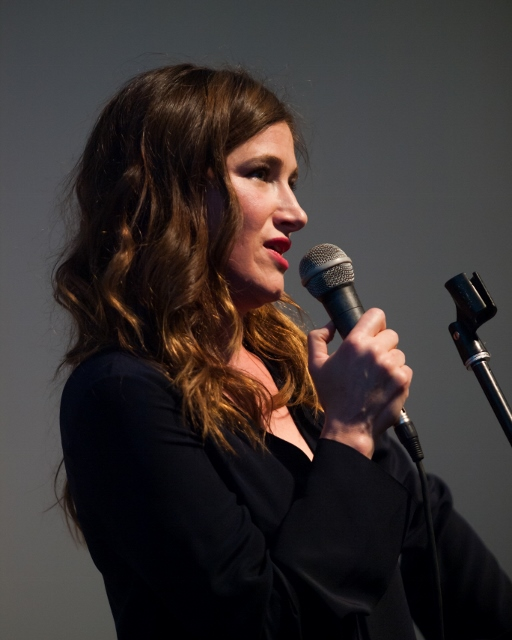
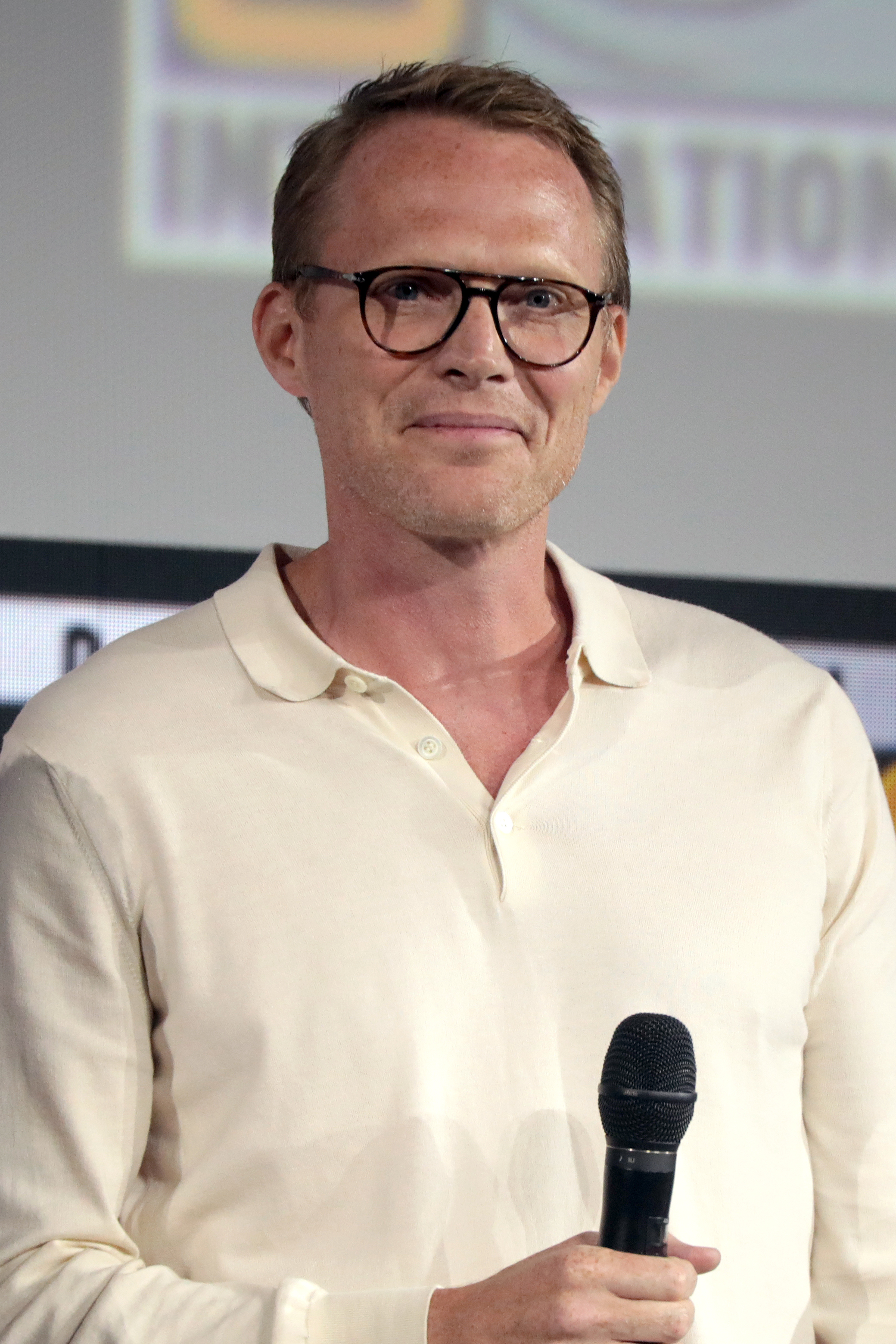
A scene between Kathryn Hahn's Agnes and Paul Bettany's Vision in the episode was highlighted by multiple critics.

The A.V. Club reviewer Stephen Robinson gave the episode an "A−". Discussing Director Hayward's speech to Rambeau, Robinson called it "a villain monologue and not exactly a subtle one" and was glad Hayward "isn't a method-acting villain who convincingly plays the part of Nice Guy until the dramatic plot twist". Robinson also praised Hahn in her scene with Vision. IGN's Matt Purslow said "WandaVision has gone from strength to strength with each new episode, and that trend certainly doesn't stop with Episode 6. While it may not have a surprise up its sleeve as outlandish as last week's unexpected visitor, Episode 6 returns to the uneasy mystery vibes of earlier chapters for quieter, but no less spectacular effect." Purslow felt Peters worked as "the perfect weird uncle" and pairing him with Billy and Tommy helped make those two more interesting characters. Vision exploring the town to investigate produced some of the series' "most unsettling imagery" while Maximoff extending the hex was "a huge set piece for the episode". He gave the episode a 9 out of 10.

Christian Holub, writing for Entertainment Weekly, felt Maximoff and Vision had "two of the worst superhero costumes in" comics and stated his enjoyment that they were turned into jokes for the episode as Halloween costumes. He gave "All-New Halloween Spooktacular!" a "B". His colleague Chancellor Agard was left "a little cold" by the episode and felt this was because he did not have an emotional connection to Malcolm in the Middle, though it could have also been something "lost" switching between the sitcom reality and the S.W.O.R.D. material. However, the scene between Vision and Agnes made him "sit up" and he called it a "very brief yet disquieting conversation". Agard praised Hahn's performance in that moment. Giving the episode 4 out of 5 stars, Abraham Riesman at Vulture did not think everything in the episode "worked, but the good stuff, the Westview stuff, was literally and figuratively magical". He said the Halloween costumes were fan service, but "refreshing and fun" since cinematic adaptations rarely incorporate direct adaptations of comic book costumes. He also enjoyed Peters' performance in the episode, and said the scene between Vision and Agnes was "unsettling", with Hahn "just completely nail[ing] the creepiness of the subverted sitcom in a way that previous episodes have only aspired to". Also giving the episode 4 out of 5 stars, Rosie Knight wrote for Den of Geek that some viewers may have been letdown by "All-New Halloween Spooktacular!" after the previous two featured "huge reveals", but said this episode "showcases the real power of WandaVision: the emotional story at its heart". Knight enjoyed Peters' performance, calling him "pitch perfect as the annoying troublesome uncle", and said Vision trying to escape the Hex was a "solid tragic hero moment" for Bettany.

Alan Sepinwall of Rolling Stone said "All-New Halloween Spooktacular!" was the first episode of the series where the sitcom material did not feel "presented in air quotes", with the early scenes coming across as "a more convincing recreation rather than an ironic one". However, he was disappointed the episode did not lean harder into the sitcom material beyond the early scenes, thinking Bettany could play "a very amusing freaked-out dad" and the series was better equipped to imitate a show like Malcolm in the Middle than The Dick Van Dyke Show or Bewitched as done in the early episodes where "less seemed to be more". IndieWire's Ben Travers was more critical of the episode, giving it a "C+" and stating that there was "zero payoff on last [episode's] closing twist, very little progress made toward Maximoff addressing her trauma, and too many empty, less-than-spooktacular shows of force. Aside from its weekly small-screen aesthetics, WandaVision still feels far too much like an inflated feature film that just keeps dragging out its story" each week.

=== Accolades ===
Hayward and Cameron were nominated for Outstanding Writing for a Limited or Anthology Series or Movie for the episode at the 73rd Primetime Emmy Awards.
