= Breaking the Fourth Wall (WandaVision) =

- WandaVision episode
- Promotional poster for WandaVision highlighting elements of the late 2000s setting seen in this episode
- Episode no.: Episode 7
- Directed by: Matt Shakman
- Written by: Cameron Squires
- Cinematography by: Jess Hall
- Editing by: Tim Roche
- Original release date: February 19, 2021
- Running time: 38 minutes

Cast
- Julian Hilliard as Billy; Jett Klyne as Tommy; Josh Stamberg as Tyler Hayward; Emma Caulfield Ford as Dottie Jones; Jolene Purdy as Beverly; David Payton as Herb; David Lengel as Phil Jones; Asif Ali as Norm; Alan Heckner as Agent Monti / the Strongman; Rachael Thompson as Major Goodner; Selena Anduze as Agent Rodriguez; Amos Glick as Dennis the delivery man; Victoria Blade as commercial woman; Ithamar Enriquez as commercial man; Wesley Kimmel as commercial boy; Sydney Thomas as commercial girl

Episode chronology
← Previous "All-New Halloween Spooktacular!"	Next → "Previously On"

"Breaking the Fourth Wall" is the seventh episode of the American television miniseries WandaVision, based on Marvel Comics featuring the characters Wanda Maximoff / Scarlet Witch and Vision. It follows the couple inside the town of Westview, New Jersey, as their idyllic suburban life begins to unravel. The episode is set in the Marvel Cinematic Universe (MCU), sharing continuity with the films of the franchise. It was written by Cameron Squires and directed by Matt Shakman.

Elizabeth Olsen and Paul Bettany reprise their respective roles as Wanda Maximoff and Vision from the film series, with Teyonah Parris, Evan Peters, Randall Park, Debra Jo Rupp, Kat Dennings, and Kathryn Hahn also starring. Development began by October 2018, and Shakman joined in August 2019. The episode pays homage to sitcoms of the mid-to-late 2000s and 2010s such as Modern Family, and reveals that Hahn's character is Agatha Harkness with the end theme song "Agatha All Along" by Kristen Anderson-Lopez and Robert Lopez. Filming took place in the Atlanta metropolitan area in Atlanta, Georgia, including at Pinewood Atlanta Studios, and in Los Angeles.

"Breaking the Fourth Wall" was released on the streaming service Disney+ on February 19, 2021. Highlights for critics included Olsen's performance, the character development of Monica Rambeau, Hahn's character reveal, and the "Agatha All Along" song, which won a Primetime Emmy Award and was nominated for a Grammy Award.

== Plot ==
In a late 2000s setting, Wanda Maximoff decides to have a day to herself. Agnes agrees to babysit Billy and Tommy and takes them to her house. Vision wakes up in a circus run by S.W.O.R.D. agents who are under Maximoff's spell. He finds Darcy Lewis, frees her from the spell, and learns about his death and the events that led to the current situation from her. Maximoff sees various parts of her house constantly reverting to prior iterations from older 'episodes' and is unable to control them. Vision and Lewis's journey back to his house is continuously interrupted at a junction point, leading Vision to assume that Maximoff is preventing him from returning home. However, he also realizes that his wife needs him and flies the rest of the way, leaving Lewis behind.

Outside Westview, Monica Rambeau and Jimmy Woo meet with S.W.O.R.D. personnel who are loyal to Rambeau's late mother rather than Director Tyler Hayward and obtain a vehicle that should be able to cross the barrier. The mission is unsuccessful, as half of the vehicle transforms into a truck. Rambeau decides to enter herself, since she has already passed through the boundary twice. She passes through the static wall and emerges with glowing eyes and having gained powers. She goes to warn Maximoff about Hayward. Maximoff does not believe her and attacks, but Rambeau can withstand her assault due to her new powers. Their confrontation is interrupted by Agnes, who asks Rambeau to leave and takes Maximoff to her house.

Agnes tells Maximoff that the twins are in the basement, but when Maximoff goes to look for them, she finds a mysterious lair. Trapping Maximoff, Agnes reveals herself as Agatha Harkness, a powerful witch. She shows Maximoff a vision of her manipulating events, revealing that she killed Sparky and sent "Pietro Maximoff" to Wanda, which is presented as a new fictional program called Agatha All Along. In a mid-credits scene, Rambeau discovers Harkness's lair but is caught by "Pietro".

A commercial during the WandaVision program advertises Nexus anti-depression drugs.

== Production ==
=== Development ===
By October 2018, Marvel Studios was developing a limited series starring Elizabeth Olsen's Wanda Maximoff and Paul Bettany's Vision from the Marvel Cinematic Universe (MCU) films. In August 2019, Matt Shakman was hired to direct the miniseries. He and head writer Jac Schaeffer executive produced alongside Marvel Studios' Kevin Feige, Louis D'Esposito, and Victoria Alonso. Feige described the series as part "classic sitcom", part "Marvel epic", paying tribute to many eras of American sitcoms. The seventh episode, "Breaking the Fourth Wall", was written by Cameron Squires, with the sitcom reality scenes paying homage to the mid-to-late 2000s and 2010s.

=== Writing ===
Because Schaeffer and the writers structured the series and Maximoff's arc based on the stages of grief, they knew that this episode was going to be the "depression episode", which happened to line-up with the confessional, mockumentary style of the sitcoms that this episode emulates, including Modern Family. Squires found some elements of writing the episode to be easy because the "talking head" segments of the mockumentary style allowed for the characters to directly tell the audience how they were feeling, but also found it a challenge to balance the different tones required for the episode. To help him with this, Schaeffer showed Squires a talking head scene from The Office where Pam Beesly tries to be happy but then breaks down crying, which showed ways that tone could change within the talking head segments.

Early drafts of the episode "On a Very Special Episode..." had elements of Maximoff and Vision's house, such as the plumbing, starting to go "haywire" as a sign that Maximoff was losing control of the sitcom reality, but this idea was eventually moved to "Breaking the Fourth Wall". Actress Teyonah Parris called Monica Rambeau's journey into the Hex in the episode her "moment to grieve and to just scream and let it out" and the "physical manifestation of Monica moving through her grief", with Parris trying to image the "heaviness of [her] guilt" and ultimately wanting to let her mother, Maria Rambeau, know she would move forward. The episode also features a mid-credits scene, the first for the series. Shakman said the mid-credits scene was included starting with this episode because "we've busted out of the television construct... so we can now introduce the Marvel language of the teaser scene... and that it happened to be when that device was invented made sense for how we were evolving the storytelling as well."

The series features fake commercials that Feige said would show "part of the truths of the show beginning to leak out", with "Breaking the Fourth Wall" including a commercial that advertises Nexus anti-depression drugs with the slogan "Because the world doesn't revolve around you. Or does it?". Matt Purslow of IGN felt this commercial was meant to represent Maximoff moving into depression from her angry grief stage, while Entertainment Weekly's Christian Holub likened the drug name "Nexus" to Marvel Comics' Nexus of All Realities, which is a portal that allows travel between dimensions. Phil Owen at TheWrap acknowledged the potential Nexus of All Realities connection but felt it was more likely that the drug was a reference to Maximoff's comic book status as a "Nexus Being", a living version of the Nexus of All Realities who can rewrite reality and is the focal point of the universe. He noted that the series depicts Maximoff as much more powerful than in the films, bringing her closer to the comic book version. An early version of the commercial saw Benedict Cumberbatch reprising his role as Dr. Stephen Strange in a "blink-and-you-miss-it cameo" as the pharmacist, before Cumberbatch was removed to avoid detracting from Maximoff's story. The series premiere of Loki in June 2021 revealed that a "Nexus event" in the MCU is an event that creates a new branched timeline in the multiverse.

=== Casting ===
The episode stars Elizabeth Olsen as Wanda Maximoff, Paul Bettany as Vision, Teyonah Parris as Monica Rambeau, Evan Peters as "Pietro Maximoff", Randall Park as Jimmy Woo, Debra Jo Rupp as Mrs. Hart, Kat Dennings as Darcy Lewis / the Escape Artist, and Kathryn Hahn as "Agnes" / Agatha Harkness. Also appearing in the episode are Julian Hilliard and Jett Klyne as Billy and Tommy, respectively, Maximoff and Vision's sons, Josh Stamberg as S.W.O.R.D. Director Tyler Hayward, Emma Caulfield Ford as Dottie Jones, Jolene Purdy as Beverly, David Payton as Herb, David Lengel as Phil Jones, Asif Ali as Norm, Alan Heckner as S.W.O.R.D. Agent Monti / the Strongman, Rachael Thompson as Major Goodner, Selena Anduze as S.W.O.R.D. Agent Rodriguez, and Amos Glick as the delivery man Dennis. Victoria Blade, Ithamar Enriquez, Wesley Kimmel, and Sydney Thomas portray the actors in the Nexus anti-depression commercial. Archival audio of a young Monica Rambeau, her mother Maria Rambeau, Carol Danvers, and Nick Fury from the film Captain Marvel (2019) is heard in the episode when Rambeau attempts to enter the Hex.

=== Design ===
Shakman and cinematographer Jess Hall put together a collection of images from existing series that influenced the framing, composition, and color of the episode's sitcom setting, and Hall created a specific color palette of 20 to 30 colors for the episode based on those reference images so he could control the "visual integrity in color" of the episode. Hall worked with production designer Mark Worthington and costume designer Mayes C. Rubeo to ensure that the sets and costumes matched with his color palette. Because the Agatha All Along sequence begins in color and then transitions to black-and-white, makeup head Tricia Sawyer coordinated with Hall to make sure the colors of Hahn's makeup looked natural in both formats. Sawyer gave her more vibrant, pink lips that Hall had to make additional adjustments to with the digital intermediate so the transition would work.

Title card for the WandaVision program's opening sequence, inspired by Modern Family

Perception, who created the end credits sequence for the series, also created two title sequences for this episode. The opening sequence is in the style of the sitcom Happy Endings, with a title card in the style of Modern Family. For the Agatha All Along title sequence, Perception created purple smoke transitions between the different shots of the montage, as well as title graphics inspired by The Munsters. Additionally, Perception provided graphics for the episode's fake commercial based on similar commercials from the late 2000s.

=== Filming ===
Soundstage filming occurred at Pinewood Atlanta Studios in Atlanta, Georgia, with Shakman directing, and Hall serving as cinematographer. Filming also took place in the Atlanta metropolitan area, with backlot and outdoor filming occurring in Los Angeles when the series resumed production after being on hiatus due to the COVID-19 pandemic. Hall began using LED lighting with the episode since the episode's sitcom era was when that equipment began to be used. The episode was filmed to emulate the "talk-to-the-camera, shaky-camera, documentary style" of modern mockumentary-style sitcoms.

The moments featured in the Agatha All Along montage, which take place at the same time as scenes from past episodes, were filmed at the same time as those episodes so the crew could utilize the sets for their time periods. Hall said there was a "shift" required to film these moments at those times, since they were often single shots using a different type of camera setup or move, such as a crane, from the rest of those episodes. He added that the sequence is more cinematic than the rest of this episode's style.

=== Visual effects ===
Tara DeMarco served as the visual effects supervisor for WandaVision, with the episode's visual effects created by SSVFX, Lola VFX, Rodeo FX, Industrial Light & Magic, Zoic Studios, Framestore, Cantina Creative, The Yard VFX, RISE, capital T, and Monsters Aliens Robots Zombies (MARZ). Rodeo FX developed the visual effects for the Hex boundary, based on the magnetization of old CRT television screens when brought into contact with magnets. The boundary is depicted as red to reflect Maximoff's anger and to reinforce that it is a hard barrier, with reflections of the environment that can be seen during daytime for which Rodeo was inspired by reflective television screens.

Rodeo was also responsible for the sequence where Rambeau enters the Hex and gains superpowers, which had very different requirements from the sequence in the previous episode that they handled where Vision attempts to leave the Hex. Rodeo created the first concept for the Rambeau sequence in February or March 2020, and did not know where the sequence would end up creatively so supervisor Julien Héry chose to use a primarily compositing-based approach that could be quickly changed by swapping out elements. After trying out various concepts with different levels of motion in them, Marvel eventually returned to the original concept. The final sequence uses various takes of Parris in different costumes that were filmed in front of a green screen, which Rodeo "smeared" together using Nuke. The final Hex environment was then built and combined with the Parris footage using Flame. The environment starts with more basic elements of the Hex, but these become more overt digital glitches the further in that Rambeau gets, with "magnetic eruptions" inspired by solar flares. This range of elements was based on a glossary that Rodeo put together to discuss possibilities for the Hex with DeMarco. One thing Héry wanted to avoid was mixing up the sequence with the powers of a different Marvel hero, so for example he intentionally avoided images that looked too similar to the Bifröst rainbow bridge from the Thor films. The rover that Rambeau attempts to drive into the Hex was built practically and used on set, but it had to be pulled by a car which Rodeo then digitally erased from the scene. It also did not move as fast as the producers wanted it to, so it is replaced with a digital version in some shots to depict it driving faster. All shots where the rover interacts with the boundary use a digital version of the vehicle, though the real rover was lifted by a crane on set to provide reference for the digital version.

DeMarco used Vision's introduction in Avengers: Age of Ultron (2015) as the definitive version of the character when approaching the visual effects for him in WandaVision. Bettany wore a bald cap and face makeup on set to match Vision's color, as well as tracking markers for the visual effects teams to reference. Complex 3D and digital makeup techniques were then used to create the character, with sections of Bettany's face replaced with CGI on a shot-by-shot basis; the actor's eyes, nose, and mouth were usually the only elements retained. SSVFX was the primary vendor for Vision in this episode. In addition to the techniques used by other vendors for creating Vision, SSVFX also adapted their bespoke methodologies for face replacements and digital de-aging to help with what would otherwise be manual clean-up. This also allowed them to match movements at a pixel level, and to add effects to shots that went "underneath" the lighting that was filmed on set. They created their own naming structure for each of the components of Vision's face to aid with the repetitive nature of the effect. Lola VFX digitally replaced Pietro's hair for a shot in the Agatha All Along sequence after Marvel decided that it should be more like the version seen in the films than the white wig that Peters wore on set for filming of the fifth episode, which is when this shot was filmed. The wig was adjusted for the filming of this episode.

=== Music ===
External audio
- W-V 2000 (From "WandaVision: Episode 7"/Audio Only) presents the full opening theme song from the episode by Robert Lopez and Kristen Anderson-Lopez, YouTube audio-only video from MarvelMusicVevo's channel

The episode's opening theme song, "W-V 2000", was written by Kristen Anderson-Lopez and Robert Lopez and performed by The Math Club. It is an instrumental track similar in style to the theme from The Office, which followed the trend of sitcoms starting in the 2000s that did not feature lyrics with their opening themes. Anderson-Lopez said if they had written lyrics for the song, they would have followed its feeling of things "speeding up and out of control". The episode also includes the theme song "Agatha All Along", (Note: The song is called "Agatha All Along" on the episode's soundtrack, but it is named "It Was ______ All Along" in the episode's credits.) which was also written by Anderson-Lopez and Lopez. It is similar to the theme song for The Munsters and the theme song for The Addams Family. The couple were drawn to the past monster-centric series' music in order to give Agatha's theme a "witchy, ghoulish feeling" with "a little bit of an Oompa-Loompa tenor feel to it too". Hahn is the lead singer on the song, with Lopez singing backup along with the other male backup singers from the series' previous theme songs. The song went viral after the release of the episode.

It was important to Shakman that the sequence where Rambeau passes through the Hex felt scary while she was in there and then triumphant once she emerges with superpowers. Composer Christophe Beck's music for the sequence went through a lot of iterations and rewrites until he and Shakman were happy with the balance of emotions in it. The music uses the theme that Beck introduced for Rambeau in the series' fourth episode and used throughout the episodes since then, but this is the first time it is used in such a bold and triumphant way which Beck felt was a satisfying musical moment for the series.

A soundtrack album for the episode was released digitally by Marvel Music and Hollywood Records on February 23, 2021, featuring Beck's score. The first two tracks are the episode's theme songs by Anderson-Lopez and Lopez. The soundtrack was originally scheduled to be released on February 26, with The Verge speculating the release was moved up due to the popularity of "Agatha All Along". Upon release, "Agatha All Along" peaked at number one on iTunes' Soundtrack chart, and, by February 24, reached fifth on iTunes' Top 100 singles chart. It also debuted on Billboard's Digital Songs Sales chart at 36.

WandaVision: Episode 7 (Original Soundtrack)
No.	Title	Length
1.	"W-V 2000" (Instrumental)	0:34
2.	"Agatha All Along" (featuring Kathryn Hahn, Robert Lopez, Eric Bradley, Greg Whipple, Jasper Randall & Gerald White)	1:02
3.	"Mondays"	0:54
4.	"The New Clown"	1:00
5.	"She's Perfect"	1:49
6.	"Getting Weird"	0:27
7.	"Your House My House"	0:44
8.	"Nexus"	1:13
9.	"Godspeed, Captain"	2:47
10.	"Rebirth"	2:01
11.	"Storytelling"	0:54
12.	"Trespasser"	2:38
13.	"Lovely to Meet You"	2:30
Total length:		18:43

== Marketing ==
In early December 2020, six posters for the series were released daily, each depicting a decade from the 1950s through the 2000s. Charles Pulliam-Moore from io9 called this poster "fitting" to be the final one released since it resembles the modern day. He felt what was "especially eyebrow-raising here is the tiny bit of green light reflecting in Maximoff's eyes". After the episode's release, Marvel announced merchandise inspired by the episode as part of its weekly "Marvel Must Haves" promotion for each episode of the series, focused on Monica Rambeau and S.W.O.R.D., including apparel, accessories, and a Funko Pop of Rambeau. Additional merchandise was later announced for the "Marvel Must Haves" promotion focused on Agatha All Along, including apparel, houseware, and accessories. In March 2021, Marvel partnered with chef Justin Warner to release a recipe for Funnel of Love's Funnel Hexes based on the funnel cakes served in the Funnel of Love truck Lewis and Vision use to escape the circus in the episode.

== Release ==
"Breaking the Fourth Wall" was released on the streaming service Disney+ on February 19, 2021. Upon the episode's release at midnight PST, Disney+ experienced technical difficulties in the United States, Canada, and United Kingdom for approximately 10 minutes, given the influx of viewers attempting to watch the episode right when it was released. The episode, along with the rest of WandaVision, was released on Ultra HD Blu-ray and Blu-ray on November 28, 2023.

== Reception ==
=== Audience viewership ===
Nielsen Media Research, which measures the number of minutes watched by United States audiences on television sets, listed WandaVision as the third most-watched original streaming series for the week of February 15 to 21, 2021. 720 million minutes were viewed across the available seven episodes, continuing the series' increase in views.

=== Critical response ===
The review aggregator website Rotten Tomatoes reported an 87% approval rating with an average score of 7.60/10 based on 23 reviews. The site's critical consensus reads, "'Breaking the Fourth Wall' puts Wanda, Vision, and the gang through the emotional wringer, delivering massive amounts of exposition in a mad dash to the season finish line."

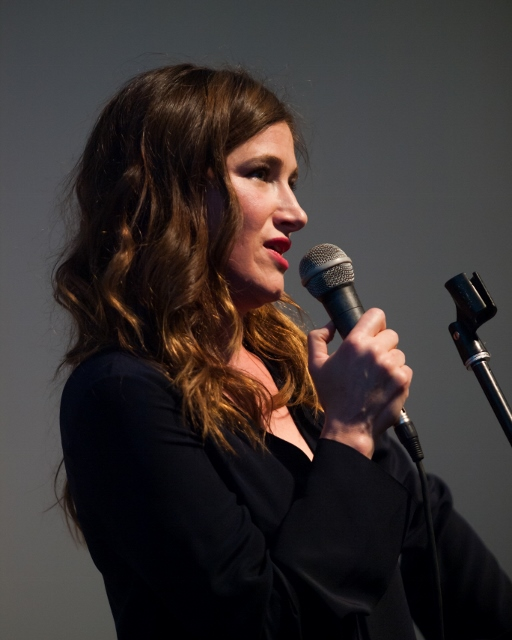
Kathryn Hahn received praise for her performance as "Agnes" / Agatha Harkness in the episode

Giving the episode a 7 out of 10, Matt Purslow at IGN initially felt it was just a filler episode that was setting up the end of the series, but this was "the calm before the storm" leading to the episode's reveal of Agnes as Agatha Harkness. Purslow praised Hahn's performance in the sequence and wished the reveal had come earlier in the series so she could have been given more screen time. The A.V. Club's Stephen Robinson also praised Hahn, finding nuance in the way she revealed Agnes's true identity without feeling like a new character. Robinson also praised the subtlety of the set design for Agnes's house, and gave the episode a "B". Other commentators also praised Hahn's performance as well as the music for the Agatha All Along sequence. Purslow felt the reveal of Agnes as Harkness had "come out of nowhere" and would have less of an impact for viewers who were not familiar with the comic book character, but Abraham Riesman of Vulture felt the opposite, explaining that the twist felt "flat" for him because comic fans had been speculating about Agnes's real identity as Harkness since before the series's premiere, but he believed it would be a thrilling reveal for other viewers who did not know about the speculation. Writing for Rolling Stone, Alan Sepinwall acknowledged that the reveal would not be surprising for comic fans but felt it worked anyway because of the execution of the Agatha All Along sequence.

Robinson and Entertainment Weekly's Chancellor Agard praised the scenes between Vision and Lewis, with Agard saying the exposition was made palatable by dark comedy. Paul Bradshaw at NME was more negative, calling the scenes a "weird diversion" from the episode's main plot and a convenient excuse to keep Vision away from Maximoff. Purslow gave the scenes as an example of the episode being mostly filler along with the fact that Rambeau's storyline apparently sets her up to become a superhero in the future. Like Purslow, Rosie Knight from Den of Geek and Ben Travers from IndieWire also speculated that Rambeau would eventually become the superhero "Spectrum" based on her new abilities. Bradshaw was excited about this element and what it meant for the future of the MCU, and Robinson said the sequence where Rambeau enters the Hex was a "triumphant moment". Agard likewise said he was "left in awe" by the sequence. Knight, who gave the episode 5 out of 5 stars, said both Rambeau and Parris had turned out to be heroes for the series, and the episode's highlighting of three super-powered, female characters (Maximoff, Rambeau, and Harkness) was noted by Bradshaw and Agard.

Agard was happy that the speculation over Rambeau's secret contact being a big cameo appearance did not turn out as fans expected, but Purslow criticized this and called it "particularly unspecial" after other surprises that the series had pulled off. There were similarly mixed reviews for the episode's sitcom homage elements. Riesman believed these were done cleverly and balanced well with the series' "weirdness and creepiness factors", and gave the episode 3 out of 5 stars. Sepinwall, on the other hand, felt the episode did not take enough advantage of the sitcom stylings and mostly stopped using them after the early scenes. He in particular felt the episode had wasted Dennings and her sitcom acting potential. Travers was even more critical of the episode, giving it a "C+" and criticizing it for not taking advantage of the sitcom-style talking head segments to address Maximoff's grief. He said the episode treated this format like it was inconvenient when it could have been "the show's greatest opportunity".

Elizabeth Olsen's performance in the episode, which was likened to Julie Bowen's Claire Dunphy from Modern Family, received widespread praise, though Purslow felt at times it was too much of an homage to that series and became too uncharacteristic of Maximoff at times in the episode. Robinson disagreed, feeling that in all instances of the series where Olsen was emulating past comedy actresses she was still portraying Maximoff as the same character deep down. Bowen herself praised the episode and said she was left "speechless" by the fact that WandaVision referenced Modern Family as a classic sitcom alongside the previous sitcoms it had homaged.

=== Accolades ===
For the 73rd Primetime Creative Arts Emmy Awards, Anderson-Lopez and Lopez won Outstanding Original Music and Lyrics for "Agatha All Along". At the 64th Annual Grammy Awards, Anderson-Lopez and Lopez were nominated for the Grammy Award for Best Song Written for Visual Media, also for "Agatha All Along".
