= Agatha All Along (song) =

2021 song from the miniseries WandaVision

- Title card from the Agatha All Along musical sequence in the WandaVision episode "Breaking the Fourth Wall"

Song by Kathryn Hahn, Robert Lopez, Eric Bradley, Greg Whipple, Jasper Randall and Gerald White

from the album WandaVision: Episode 7 (Original Soundtrack)
- Released: February 23, 2021
- Genre: Surf rock
- Length: 1:02
- Label: Marvel Music; Hollywood
- Songwriters: Kristen Anderson-Lopez; Robert Lopez
- Producers: Robert Lopez; Kristen Anderson-Lopez

Video
- "Agatha All Along" theme song and title sequence on YouTube

"Agatha All Along", also known as "It Was ______ All Along", is an original song from the Marvel Studios Disney+ miniseries WandaVision. Written by the series' theme song composers Kristen Anderson-Lopez and Robert Lopez for the seventh episode, "Breaking the Fourth Wall", the song was performed by star Kathryn Hahn, with Lopez, Eric Bradley, Greg Whipple, Jasper Randall, and Gerald White serving as backup singers. The song drew inspiration from the theme songs from The Munsters and The Addams Family.

"Agatha All Along" went viral after appearing in "Breaking the Fourth Wall", and was officially released on February 23, 2021, as part of the WandaVision: Episode 7 (Original Soundtrack). It debuted on Billboard's Digital Song Sales chart at number 36, and earned Anderson-Lopez and Lopez a Primetime Emmy Award for Outstanding Original Music and Lyrics, among other accolades.

== Background and production ==
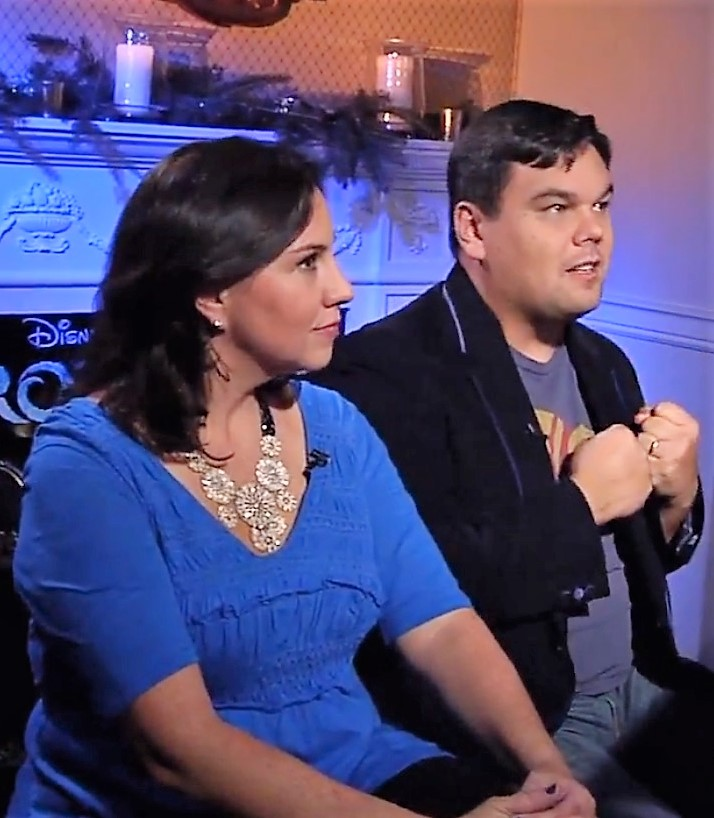
Kristen Anderson-Lopez (L) and Robert Lopez (R)

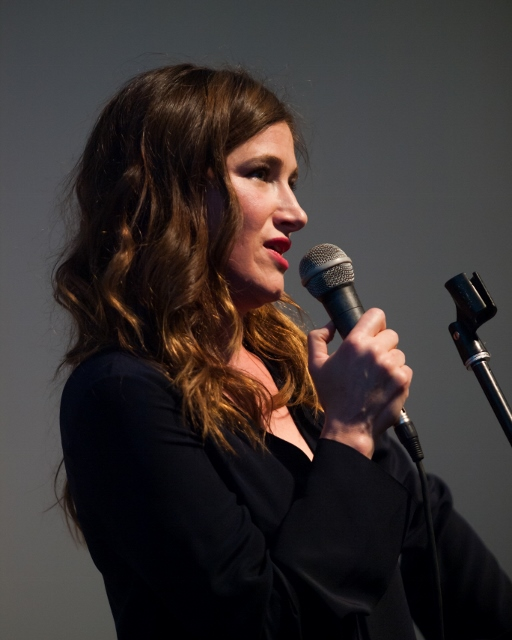
Kathryn Hahn

Lopez provided background vocals for "Agatha All Along" and co-wrote it with his wife, Anderson-Lopez, while Hahn sang lead vocals.

In December 2020, songwriting couple Robert Lopez and Kristen Anderson-Lopez were announced to have written theme songs for some of the episodes of the Marvel Studios Disney+ miniseries WandaVision. The seventh episode of the series, "Breaking the Fourth Wall", which was released on Disney+ on February 19, 2021, ended by revealing that Kathryn Hahn's character Agnes was actually Agatha Harkness and the manipulator of Wanda Maximoff's idyllic suburban lifestyle inspired by American sitcoms. The reveal was accompanied by a title sequence for the series Agatha All Along, which featured Anderson Lopez and Lopez's theme and sequences showing moments Agatha had been behind. The credits for "Breaking the Fourth Wall" list the song's name as "It Was ______ All Along". When developing the episode, the WandaVision writers wrote placeholder theme songs into the episodes before Anderson-Lopez and Lopez were brought on board, with Cameron Squires, the writer of "Breaking the Fourth Wall", originally naming the Agatha theme "That's So Agatha", as a reference to the television series That's So Raven.

"Agatha All Along" was written to be similar to the theme song for The Munsters and "The Addams Family Theme" from The Addams Family. The couple were drawn to the past monster-centric series' music to give Agatha's theme song a "witchy, ghoulish feeling" with "a little bit of an Oompa-Loompa tenor feel to it too" and the feeling of something in a haunted house. Initially, Anderson-Lopez and Lopez tried creating a song in a similar vein to "That Girl" by Stevie Wonder, but they felt it was not the right fit. They then began thinking of the song as being about witches, leading them to shows about witches and Goth figures as well as "Halloween-y" songs with a "grinding, growling" baritone saxophone.

"Agatha All Along"'s chord progression begins in E minor before moving a tritone to B-flat in the bass, with a bridge centered in G major and a "Shave and a Haircut" ending. The tritone is the same interval used by Anderson-Lopez and Lopez in the final two notes of their four-note WandaVision motif used in their other theme songs. The song includes "a big-band horn riff", "kitschy" electric harpsichord for the repeated chorus, "cheery baritones", a "'clap-clap, clap' snare", and is sung in "kooky-spooky voices", with lyrics that reveal how Agatha had been behind all of the show's tragedies.

Lopez and Anderson-Lopez produced the song, with Anderson-Lopez conceiving the lyrics and Lopez composing the music. "Agatha All Along" was arranged and orchestrated by Dave Metzger. Hahn is the lead singer on the theme, with Lopez singing backup alongside Eric Bradley, Greg Whipple, Jasper Randall, and Gerald White, the other male backup singers from previous theme songs. Because of the COVID-19 pandemic, Hahn recorded her vocals over Zoom. The WandaVision spin-off series centered on Agatha, with Hahn reprising her role, is also titled Agatha All Along (2024).

== Release ==
"Agatha All Along" was released digitally by Marvel Music and Hollywood Records on February 23, 2021, as the second track on the soundtrack WandaVision: Episode 7 (Original Soundtrack). The soundtrack was originally scheduled to be released on February 26, with The Verge speculating the release was moved up due to the popularity of the song. On September 6, 2024, Hollywood Records released a Dave Audé remix of the song.

== Reception ==
=== Critical response ===
Upon the release of "Breaking the Fourth Wall", "Agatha All Along" went viral, with viewers particularly drawn to the theme, creating various remixes, memes, and TikTok videos in the following days. A trap remix created by Leland Philpot received the attention of Anderson-Lopez, who called it "the most glorious thing", while Lopez enjoyed a rock remix from Timmy Sean, saying it was "incredible" that Sean was able to release it shortly after the episode without any sheet music available. By February 23, the hashtag for the song had become a trending topic on Twitter, with Disney linking the hashtag to their Agatha emoji. Disney's president of marketing Asad Ayaz called the moment "a zeitgeisty thing" and his team quickly released the official clip after unofficial ones were going viral. Ayaz noted that the marketing team had a plan around the reveal of Agnes really being Agatha and allowed the fans to help "drive the conversation". Lopez admitted that they did not anticipate "Agatha All Along" would have garnered so much popularity, since by that point they had assumed none of their themes would have become hits since the previous one had not reached any level of popularity. Matt Shakman, the episode's director, and Hahn were also taken aback by the song's popularity.

Commentators called the song "catchy", with "delicious" lyrics, and likened it to "Toss a Coin to Your Witcher" from The Witcher Netflix series, which also went viral. The song was also called "the official song of summer 2021", the song of the year, and a song that would be requested at celebrations and nightclubs following the COVID-19 pandemic. Alex Zalben at Decider expanded on why this theme appeared to be more popular than the past WandaVision themes, saying that emulating The Munsters theme allowed it to have "a catchy riff that works, a tried and true earworm" and adding that songs for villains, as seen in many of Walt Disney Animation Studios' films, are more fun and let the villain "ham it up". The Los Angeles Times' August Brown agreed with Zalben that "Agatha All Along" was WandaVision's villain song, describing it as "a meme-able, deliciously vampy single that gleefully twisted the plot of the show" and one that would "likely live on outside it as entrance music for anyone looking to stir chaos". Brown called Hahn's singing perfect with "brassy conviction". Antonio Ferme of Variety called "Agatha All Along" "the greatest character introduction song of all time" and "arguably the most aggressive earworm" of the WandaVision theme songs. Writing for Polygon, Joshua Rivera felt "Agatha All Along" was Anderson-Lopez and Lopez's "finest moment" of WandaVision, calling the song the series' "first real earworm: short, sticky, and extremely meme-able". Collider's Gregory Lawrence felt the theme was an "objectively great surf-rock banger" with "pitch-perfect aping of '60s surf rock [and horror sitcom theme] tropes". Lawrence's colleague Emma Fraser ranked "Agatha All Along" as the best of the WandaVision theme songs, believing it would lead to Anderson-Lopez and Lopez winning an Emmy.

=== Commercial performance ===
Following its release, "Agatha All Along" peaked at number one on iTunes' Soundtrack chart, and by February 24, 2021, reached fifth on iTunes' Top 100 singles chart. For the week ending February 25, 2021, "Agatha All Along" placed 36th on Billboard's Digital Song Sales chart, with 3,000 downloads, while also garnering 1.6 million U.S. streams. The song charted for three weeks on OCC's UK Singles chart, from March 3 to March 18, 2021, peaking at 53rd in its second week.

=== Accolades ===
"Agatha All Along" was nominated at the 2021 MTV Movie & TV Awards for Best Musical Moment; the song and Hahn were nominated at the 2021 Dorian Awards for Best TV Musical Performance; for the 73rd Primetime Creative Arts Emmy Awards, Anderson-Lopez and Lopez won Outstanding Original Music and Lyrics for the song; and the song was nominated at the 64th Annual Grammy Awards for the Grammy Award for Best Song Written for Visual Media.

== See also ==
- "The Ballad of the Witches' Road", an original song from the WandaVision spin-off series Agatha All Along
