= WandaVision =

2021 Marvel Studios television miniseries

- Genre: Drama; Mystery; Romance; Sitcom; Superhero
- Created by: Jac Schaeffer
- Based on: Marvel Comics
- Directed by: Matt Shakman
- Starring: Elizabeth Olsen; Paul Bettany; Debra Jo Rupp; Fred Melamed; Kathryn Hahn; Teyonah Parris; Randall Park; Kat Dennings; Evan Peters
- Theme music composer: Kristen Anderson-Lopez; Robert Lopez
- Composer: Christophe Beck
- Country of origin: United States
- Original language: English
- No. of seasons: 1
- No. of episodes: 9

Production
- Executive producers: Kevin Feige; Louis D'Esposito; Victoria Alonso; Matt Shakman; Jac Schaeffer
- Production locations: Atlanta, Georgia; Los Angeles
- Cinematography: Jess Hall
- Editors: Tim Roche; Zene Baker; Nona Khodai; Michael A. Webber
- Camera setup: Single-camera; Multi-camera
- Running time: 30–50 minutes
- Production company: Marvel Studios

Original release
- Network: Disney+
- Release: January 15 – March 5, 2021

Related
- Agatha All Along; VisionQuest; Marvel Cinematic Universe television series

WandaVision is an American television miniseries created by Jac Schaeffer for the streaming service Disney+, based on Marvel Comics featuring the characters Wanda Maximoff / Scarlet Witch and Vision. It is the first television series in the Marvel Cinematic Universe (MCU) produced by Marvel Studios, sharing continuity with the films of the franchise, and is set after the events of the film Avengers: Endgame (2019). It follows Wanda Maximoff and Vision as they live an idyllic suburban life in the town of Westview, New Jersey, until their reality starts moving through different decades of sitcom homages and television tropes. Schaeffer served as head writer for the series, which was directed by Matt Shakman.

Elizabeth Olsen and Paul Bettany reprise their respective roles as Wanda and Vision from the film series, with Debra Jo Rupp, Fred Melamed, Kathryn Hahn, Teyonah Parris, Randall Park, Kat Dennings, and Evan Peters also starring. By September 2018, Marvel Studios was developing several limited series for Disney+ centered on supporting characters from the MCU films such as Wanda and Vision, with Olsen and Bettany returning. Schaeffer was hired in January 2019, with the series officially announced in April, and Shakman joining in August. The production used era-appropriate sets, costumes, and effects to recreate the different sitcom styles that the series pays homage to. Filming began in Atlanta, Georgia, in November 2019, before production halted in March 2020 due to the COVID-19 pandemic. Production resumed in Los Angeles in September 2020 and wrapped that November.

WandaVision premiered with its first two episodes on January 15, 2021, and ran for nine episodes, concluding on March 5. It is the first series, and the beginning, of Phase Four of the MCU. The series received praise from critics for its homages to past sitcoms and for the performances of its cast, especially those of Olsen, Bettany, and Hahn, though there was criticism for the finale. It was widely discussed and analyzed by fans based on various popular theories, as well as by commentators for its exploration of grief and nostalgia. The series received numerous accolades, including 23 Primetime Emmy Award nominations, winning three. Olsen reprised her role in the film Doctor Strange in the Multiverse of Madness (2022), which continues Wanda's story from WandaVision. Two spin-off series, Agatha All Along which focuses on Hahn's Agatha Harkness and premiered in September 2024, and VisionQuest which focuses on Bettany's Vision and premiered in October 2026, form a trilogy with WandaVision.

== Premise ==
Three weeks after the events of Avengers: Endgame (2019), Wanda Maximoff and Vision are living an idyllic suburban life in the town of Westview, New Jersey, trying to conceal their true natures. As their surroundings begin to move through different decades and they encounter various television tropes, the couple suspects that things are not as they seem.

== Cast and characters ==
- Elizabeth Olsen as Wanda Maximoff / Scarlet Witch:
  An Avenger who can harness chaos magic, engage in telepathy and telekinesis, and alter reality. Olsen said the series brings the character more in line with the comic book version, including depicting her mental illness, while introducing the "Scarlet Witch" moniker to the Marvel Cinematic Universe (MCU). Executive producer Kevin Feige said the series explores the extent and origin of Wanda's powers. Olsen felt her "ownership" of Wanda was strengthened during development of the series, which allowed her to explore new parts of the character's personality such as her humor and sassiness. She was thrilled that WandaVision focuses on Wanda rather than making her a supporting character as in the films, and was sold on joining the series when Feige mentioned specific Scarlet Witch comic storylines that inspired WandaVision. Olsen was influenced by Mary Tyler Moore, Elizabeth Montgomery, and Lucille Ball for her performance. Michaela Russell portrays a young Wanda.
- Paul Bettany as Vision:
  An android and former Avenger created using the artificial intelligences J.A.R.V.I.S. and Ultron as well as the Mind Stone, who was killed in the film Avengers: Infinity War (2018). Bettany portrays a new version of the character created by Wanda within her reality from the part of the Mind Stone that lives in her, who is the embodiment of her sadness, hope, and love. The writers referred to him as "Soul Vision", and Bettany described him as "decent and honorable". He was influenced by the performances of Dick Van Dyke and Hugh Laurie for this version. Bettany also plays the original character, referred to as "White Vision" or "The Vision", who is reassembled and reactivated by S.W.O.R.D. (Sentient Weapon Observation and Response Division). That version has an all-white appearance, similar to when the comic book character was resurrected with an all-white body and no memories or emotions. Bettany differentiated the two versions by portraying the latter as both familiar and intimidating.
- Debra Jo Rupp as Sharon Davis: A Westview resident and wife of Todd who plays "Mrs. Hart" in the fictional WandaVision sitcom.
- Fred Melamed as Todd Davis: A Westview resident and husband of Sharon who plays "Arthur Hart", Vision's boss, in the fictional WandaVision sitcom.
- Kathryn Hahn as Agatha Harkness:
  A witch who masquerades as "Agnes", Wanda and Vision's "nosy neighbor" within the fictional WandaVision sitcom. Hahn described Agnes as the neighbor that "won't get off their couch at the end of the night" and is "always in [their] business", and likened Agatha's relationship with Wanda to Antonio Salieri's with Wolfgang Amadeus Mozart. She explained that Agatha has been studying magic for centuries and is maddened to see it come so naturally to Wanda. Agatha was conceived as a mentor figure to Wanda, but was shifted by the writers to be more antagonistic to better serve the series' structure. Despite this, Agatha retains qualities of teaching for Wanda.
- Teyonah Parris as Monica Rambeau:
  The daughter of Air Force pilot Maria Rambeau and a captain in S.W.O.R.D., who introduces herself in the fictional WandaVision sitcom as "Geraldine". She has a "toughness and an ability to be a woman" in a male-dominated world. Head writer Jac Schaeffer's pitch for the series had a different character in Rambeau's role, but she was excited to use Rambeau instead when she became available for the series. Co-executive producer Mary Livanos added that Rambeau's inclusion was a discovery during development that became "really enriched in the show", as it allowed an empathetic character like Rambeau to become a "hero in her own right". The series shows what Rambeau has done since her introduction as a child looking up to her mother's friend and colleague Carol Danvers / Captain Marvel in the film Captain Marvel (2019), where she was portrayed by Akira Akbar. Parris used Akbar's performance as the starting point for her own, taking Rambeau's relationships with her mother and Danvers into account.
- Randall Park as Jimmy Woo:
  An FBI agent working with S.W.O.R.D. who previously was the parole officer of Scott Lang / Ant-Man. Park felt introducing Woo using close-up magic, something he was trying to perfect in the film Ant-Man and the Wasp (2018), quickly showed the character's development since that film, indicating that he is getting better at multiple things and is being assigned to larger cases. Park was taught the magic trick by a magician and spent several days perfecting it for the series.
- Kat Dennings as Darcy Lewis:
  An astrophysicist working with S.W.O.R.D. who previously interned for Jane Foster and befriended Thor. Returning to the role for the first time since the film Thor: The Dark World (2013), Dennings felt Lewis would not have changed much as a person, but would be older and wiser after going to school to receive her doctorate in astrophysics. Additionally, Dennings felt the character has more confidence in herself now that she is viewed as "the boss" which she never was in the films.
- Evan Peters as Ralph Bohner:
  A Westview resident under Agatha's control, posing as Wanda's deceased twin brother Pietro Maximoff, who was portrayed by Aaron Taylor-Johnson in prior MCU films. Schaeffer and Livanos were eager to bring Pietro back in the series, and decided to take advantage of its notions of "what's real and what's not, and performance, and casting, and audience, and fandom" by having the character be "recast" within the fictional WandaVision program. The casting of Peters was a reference to his role as Peter Maximoff in 20th Century Fox's X-Men film series. Schaeffer noted that this recasting worked for the series on a meta level by playing on the sitcom tropes of recasting characters without much fuss and also of having a relative arrive in town who "stirs things up" with the sitcom's family. Shakman said Peters' role in the series was a way to play with the audience's expectations in a similar way to Ben Kingsley playing Trevor Slattery in the film Iron Man 3 (2013), in which that character poses as the Mandarin. Schaeffer likened Peters' performance to a mixture of the characters Jesse Katsopolis from Full House (1987–1995), Nick Moore from Family Ties (1982–1989), and Joey Tribbiani from Friends (1994–2004).

Recurring residents of Westview include Asif Ali as Abilash Tandon who plays Vision's co-worker "Norm"; David Lengel as Harold Proctor who plays "Phil Jones"; Amos Glick as a pizza delivery man cast as "Dennis", the mailman/delivery man; Ithamar Enriquez and Victoria Blade as residents cast as the commercial man and woman actors; Emma Caulfield Ford as Sarah Proctor, Harold's wife who plays "Dottie Jones", a "skeptical mom who rules the neighborhood with an iron fist and poison smile"; and David Payton as John Collins who plays "Herb". Josh Stamberg also recurs as S.W.O.R.D. acting director Tyler Hayward, along with Alan Heckner and Selena Anduze as S.W.O.R.D. agents Monti and Rodriguez. Julian Hilliard and Jett Klyne portray Wanda and Vision's sons Billy and Tommy, respectively.

Additional guest stars include Jolene Purdy as Isabel Matsueda who plays Wanda and Vision's neighbor "Beverly"; frequent MCU stuntman Zac Henry as Franklin, a S.W.O.R.D. agent who becomes a beekeeper when he enters Wanda's reality; Randy Oglesby as a Westview resident who plays "Stan Nielson", the town's doctor; Wesley Kimmel and Sydney Thomas as the boy and girl in the commercials; and Kate Forbes as Agatha's mother, Evanora Harkness. Ilana Kohanchi and Daniyar portray the Maximoffs' parents Iryna and Olek Maximoff, respectively, while Gabriel Gurevich plays a young version of her brother Pietro.

== Episodes ==
No.	Title	Directed by	Written by	Original release date
1	"Filmed Before a Live Studio Audience"	Matt Shakman	Jac Schaeffer	January 15, 2021
Newlywed couple Wanda Maximoff and Vision move into the town of Westview in a black-and-white setting that recalls classic 1950s and 1960s sitcoms. They attempt to blend in despite Vision being an android and Wanda having telekinesis and reality-warping abilities. One day they notice a heart drawn on their calendar, but cannot remember what the occasion is. While Vision goes to his job at Computational Services Inc., Wanda decides that the heart represents their anniversary. Their neighbor Agnes introduces herself to Wanda and helps her prepare to celebrate that night. Vision amazes his co-workers with his speed but is unsure what his company actually does. He is reminded that the heart represents plans for him and Wanda to host his boss, Mr. Hart, and his wife for dinner. Wanda and Vision struggle to hide their abilities while making a last-minute dinner. While interrogating Wanda and Vision, Mr. Hart chokes on his food and Vision uses his abilities to save him. All of this takes place in the fictional sitcom WandaVision which someone is watching on a television. A commercial during the WandaVision program advertises a Stark Industries ToastMate 2000 toaster.
2	"Don't Touch That Dial"	Matt Shakman	Gretchen Enders	January 15, 2021
In a 1960s setting, Wanda and Vision hear strange noises outside their house. They prepare their magic act for a neighborhood talent show. Wanda and Agnes spend the day with the show's planning committee, led by Dottie, and Vision attends a neighborhood watch meeting, where he accidentally swallows some chewing gum. Wanda befriends another neighbor, Geraldine, and notices more strange things: a yellow and red toy helicopter in their black-and-white world; a voice on the radio that seems to be speaking to her; and a red bloodstain. Thanks to the gum caught in his internal mechanisms, Vision appears to be intoxicated at the talent show and publicly reveals his abilities. Wanda uses her own abilities to make this look like simple magic tricks and fixes Vision by removing the gum. They return home, and Wanda becomes visibly pregnant. When they see a strange beekeeper emerging from a manhole on their street, Wanda resets their reality to before the figure appears. The setting changes to full color as it moves to the 1970s. A commercial during the WandaVision program advertises Strücker watches.
3	"Now in Color"	Matt Shakman	Megan McDonnell	January 22, 2021
In the 1970s setting, Dr. Nielson says Wanda is four months pregnant and everything is fine before leaving for an intended holiday with his wife. While Vision sees Nielson out, he sees his neighbor Herb unknowingly cut through their wall. Wanda and Vision paint a nursery while debating what to name their child before Wanda's pregnancy elevates to six months. When she begins contractions, her abilities begin to move things in the house and eventually shut down the entire town's power. Geraldine arrives and helps Wanda deliver twins Billy and Tommy. Vision catches Agnes and Herb gossiping outside. They talk about Geraldine, who has just arrived in town and does not have a home or family. Inside, Wanda interrogates Geraldine after the latter reveals that she knows Ultron killed Wanda's twin brother Pietro. (Note: As depicted in Avengers: Age of Ultron (2015).) Wanda notices that Geraldine is wearing a pendant with a sword emblem on it. When Vision returns, Geraldine is gone. Outside of Westview, Geraldine emerges through a wall of static and is surrounded by S.W.O.R.D. agents. A commercial during the WandaVision program advertises Hydra Soak bath powder.
4	"We Interrupt This Program"	Matt Shakman	Bobak Esfarjani and Megan McDonnell	January 29, 2021
Captain Monica Rambeau, an agent of S.W.O.R.D., returns to life following the Blip (Note: As a result of the actions of the Avengers during the events of Avengers: Endgame (2019).) to find her mother Maria has died of cancer. Three weeks later, Rambeau returns to work and is sent by Acting Director Tyler Hayward to help FBI agent Jimmy Woo with a missing persons case in Westview, New Jersey. They discover a hexagonal static CMBR field surrounding the town, which Rambeau is pulled into. Within 24 hours, S.W.O.R.D. establishes a base around the town and sends drones and an agent in to investigate. Dr. Darcy Lewis studies the phenomena and discovers broadcast signals for the sitcom WandaVision. They use these to observe events inside the town, learning that real residents have been "cast" in the sitcom and seeing Rambeau appear as "Geraldine". Lewis and Woo unsuccessfully attempt to use the radio to contact Wanda. When Rambeau mentions Ultron, Wanda casts her out of the town. Wanda then temporarily sees Vision appear as he did when he died, (Note: As depicted in Avengers: Infinity War (2018).) before settling back into her sitcom life with him.
5	"On a Very Special Episode..."	Matt Shakman	Peter Cameron and Mackenzie Dohr	February 5, 2021
In a 1980s/early 1990s setting, Wanda and Vision struggle to stop Billy and Tommy from crying. Agnes offers to help look after the boys, but Vision questions her behavior. He and Wanda are interrupted when Billy and Tommy suddenly age up to 5 years old. When a dog appears at their house, the boys ask to keep it and Agnes suggests the name Sparky. Wanda almost reveals her abilities to Agnes, concerning Vision, while the boys age up again to 10 years old. At work, Vision reads an email from S.W.O.R.D. that reveals the situation in Westview. He breaks through to a real Westview resident and learns that Wanda is controlling the town. S.W.O.R.D. sends a drone from the 1980s into Westview which causes Sparky to run off. Hayward orders the drone be used to kill Wanda, but she emerges from the barrier with it and warns Hayward to leave her alone. Agnes finds Sparky dead. Vision confronts Wanda about her actions, but they are interrupted when "Pietro" arrives. Watching the broadcast, Lewis notes that Pietro has been "recast". A commercial during the WandaVision program advertises Lagos paper towels.
6	"All-New Halloween Spooktacular!"	Matt Shakman	Chuck Hayward and Peter Cameron	February 12, 2021
In a late 1990s/early 2000s setting, Wanda wants to spend Tommy and Billy's first Halloween together as a family, but Vision tells her that he is going to patrol the streets with the neighborhood watch. "Pietro" offers to step in as a father figure and takes the boys trick-or-treating, causing mischief with his super speed, which Tommy is revealed to have inherited. Meanwhile, Vision explores further away from their house and finds residents of Westview standing frozen in their positions, including Agnes. Vision speaks to Agnes' real self and she tells him that he is dead. Outside Westview, Hayward orders Rambeau, Lewis, and Woo to leave the base for disagreeing with his decision to attack Wanda, but they sneak inside and hack into his computer to discover that he has been tracking Vision's vibranium signature. Vision tries to push through the static wall, but he begins to disintegrate. Billy senses this with his own telepathic powers and tells Wanda, who expands the hexagonal static wall. Vision, Lewis, and several S.W.O.R.D. agents are enveloped by the new boundary. A claymation commercial during the WandaVision program advertises Yo-Magic yogurt.
7	"Breaking the Fourth Wall"	Matt Shakman	Cameron Squires	February 19, 2021
In a mid-to-late 2000s setting, Wanda decides to have a day to herself and Agnes agrees to babysit Tommy and Billy. Wanda sees various parts of her house constantly changing and is unable to control them. Vision wakes up to find the S.W.O.R.D. agents inside the boundary are now members of a circus. He releases Lewis from the spell and she tells Vision about his death and the events that led to the current situation. Outside of Westview, Rambeau and Woo meet with loyal S.W.O.R.D. personnel and obtain a vehicle designed to cross the barrier. When the tactic proves unsuccessful, Rambeau decides to enter herself. She passes through the static wall and emerges with seemingly heightened vision. Rambeau confronts Wanda, but Agnes tells Rambeau to leave and takes Wanda to her house. Wanda looks for the boys in the basement and discovers a strange lair. Agnes introduces herself as a witch named Agatha Harkness and reveals that she has been disrupting Wanda's life, including sending an imposter as "Pietro" and killing Sparky. A commercial during the WandaVision program advertises Nexus antidepressants.
8	"Previously On"	Matt Shakman	Laura Donney	February 26, 2021
In Salem in 1693, a coven of witches led by Agatha's mother Evanora attempt to execute Agatha for practicing dark magic, but she drains their life forces. In the present, Agatha demands to know how Wanda is controlling Westview and forces Wanda to relive key memories. Agatha learns that Wanda has had magical abilities since she was a child which were amplified by the Mind Stone, and she has always enjoyed sitcoms. After the Blip, Wanda visited S.W.O.R.D. to recover Vision's body, but Hayward refused to let her bury him. Unable to feel any life in Vision, she drove to a lot in Westview that he had bought for her before his death so they could live there together. In a fit of grief, she manifested a house on the lot and a new version of Vision, and extended the Hex across the entire town. Agatha concludes that Wanda possesses a legendary form of magic called chaos magic, and dubs her the "Scarlet Witch". In a mid-credits scene, Hayward reactivates "The Vision", the now all-white, reassembled original body.
9	"The Series Finale"	Matt Shakman	Jac Schaeffer	March 5, 2021
Agatha attempts to take Wanda's chaos magic, but is interrupted by The Vision who tries to kill Wanda. Wanda's Vision intervenes and fights The Vision throughout Westview. Agatha frees the town's residents from Wanda's control, and they convince her to open the barrier. She stops when Vision and the twins begin to disintegrate, but not before Hayward and S.W.O.R.D. enter. Rambeau learns that "Pietro" is an actor named Ralph Bohner and frees him from Agatha's control, before helping the twins stop S.W.O.R.D. The Vision flees after Vision restores his memories. Wanda places magical runes around the barrier that prevent Agatha from using magic, and traps her in the "Agnes" persona. Wanda says goodbye to Vision and the twins before collapsing the Hex and going into hiding. In a mid-credits scene, Hayward is arrested while Rambeau is informed by a Skrull that a friend of her mother's wants to meet. In a post-credits scene, Wanda hears the twins cry for help while studying the Darkhold in her astral form.

== Production ==
=== Development ===
By September 2018, Marvel Studios was developing several limited series for its parent company Disney's streaming service, Disney+, to be centered on supporting characters from the Marvel Cinematic Universe (MCU) films who had not starred in their own films, such as Wanda Maximoff. Actors who portrayed the characters in the films were expected to reprise their roles for the limited series, including Elizabeth Olsen as Wanda. The series for Disney+ were expected to be six to eight episodes each, have a "hefty [budget] rivaling those of a major studio production", and be produced by Marvel Studios rather than Marvel Television, which produced previous MCU television series. Marvel Studios President Kevin Feige was believed to be taking a "hands-on role" in each limited series' development, focusing on "continuity of story" with the films and "handling" the actors who would be reprising their roles from the films. Brian Chapek, a director of production & development and creative executive at Marvel Studios, began initial work on a Wanda series before co-executive producer Mary Livanos joined the project in mid-2018 and took over the series' development. By the end of October, Paul Bettany's Vision was expected to play a significant role in the series, which would focus on the relationship between Wanda and Vision. In the following months, the titles Vision and the Scarlet Witch and The Vision and Scarlet Witch were both reported.

Feige came up with the idea of having Wanda and Vision living in a fantasy world of "suburban bliss", based on his love of sitcoms and how they can be used to escape from reality. When he was meeting with potential head writers for the series, some did not feel his proposed sitcom element would work. Jac Schaeffer, who was working on the MCU film Black Widow (2021) at the time, heard the premise of the series and was excited by it. She had a meeting to pitch her ideas, and was hired as head writer in January 2019. Schaeffer was set to write the first episode and executive produce the series. That April, Disney and Marvel officially announced the series as WandaVision, and Matt Shakman was hired to direct and serve as an executive producer in August. Feige also executive produces alongside Marvel Studios' Louis D'Esposito and Victoria Alonso. Rather than call the series Wanda and Vision or The Scarlet Witch and Vision, Feige was inspired to use a compound title like WandaVision after seeing the title for the film BlacKkKlansman (2018), but he was hesitant about using it. Schaeffer insisted on using the title after hearing it, feeling it was perfect for the series. There was some backlash when the title was announced as it was perceived to be "the silliest title possible", but Schaeffer felt viewers would change their minds once they watched the series. Feige said the series would tell the story of Wanda and Vision, show Wanda's full abilities, explore who Vision is, and introduce Wanda's comic book name "Scarlet Witch" to the MCU "in ways that are entirely fun, entirely funny, [and] somewhat scary". He added that the series would have repercussions for the rest of the MCU's Phase Four, but said viewers would not need to be familiar with the MCU to understand the series. He did think there would be a "wealth of rewards" for those who had already seen all the MCU films and knew the plans for Phase Four.

The series was described as part sitcom, part "Marvel epic" by Feige, "super avant-garde and weird" by Bettany, an action movie mixed with sitcoms by actor Teyonah Parris, and a combination of superhero action and "small-town sitcom silliness" by Livanos. Shakman was "uniquely equipped" to direct such a series because of his experience directing series like the psychological drama Mad Men (2007–2015), the large-scale action series Game of Thrones (2011–2019), and sitcoms like It's Always Sunny in Philadelphia (2005–present). Shakman also felt more qualified to make WandaVision since he was a child actor on 1980s sitcoms such as Just the Ten of Us (1988–1990). The series totals approximately six hours of content across nine episodes, which vary from a half-hour comedy format to 50 minutes long. During development, the budget was reported to be as much as $25 million per episode.

=== Writing ===
==== Inception and structure ====
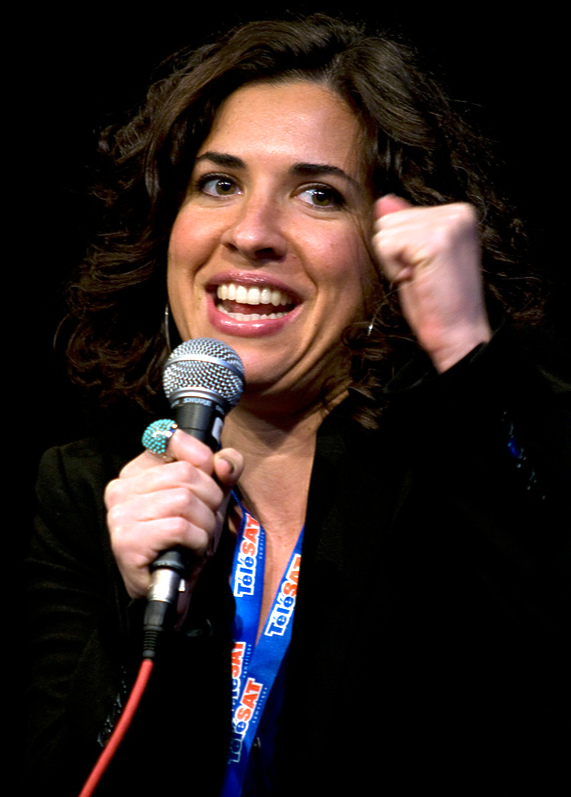
Jac Schaeffer created WandaVision and served as head writer for the series.

Much of the series takes place within a fictional sitcom called WandaVision. Schaeffer received comics material and an outline of what Marvel Studios hoped to accomplish so she could help shape their ideas. Feige was visually inspired by Mike del Mundo's "Norman Rockwell meets Leave it to Beaver" covers for the comic book series Vision (2015–2016) by Tom King and Gabriel Hernandez Walta, and pitched the series to Olsen and Bettany as a combination of that comic book and the "House of M" storyline by Brian Michael Bendis and Olivier Coipel. Other inspiration was taken from the Scarlet Witch: Witches' Road trade paperback, the "Avengers Disassembled" storyline by Bendis and David Finch that preceded "House of M", the "Vision Quest" storyline from West Coast Avengers by John Byrne, and the comic book runs of The Vision and the Scarlet Witch by Bill Mantlo and Rick Leonardi, and by Steve Englehart and Richard Howell.

Feige, Schaeffer, Shakman, and Livanos dedicated themselves to "nail[ing] down" the series' irreverent tone. Schaeffer was inspired by the MCU film Thor: Ragnarok (2017) and the Marvel Television X-Men series Legion (2017–19), believing those projects broke the mold of what Marvel stories could be and were daring, original, and "bananas". She felt they allowed WandaVision to also be unique and different, and noted that it would be the polar opposite to her work on Black Widow which focused on aggressive, visceral action. Schaeffer hired Gretchen Enders, Megan McDonnell, Bobak Esfarjani, Peter Cameron, Mackenzie Dohr, Chuck Hayward, Cameron Squires, and Laura Donney for the series' writers room, a grouping of half men, half women, and several people of color, because Schaeffer believed the varying perspectives would create better stories. Each writer had different areas of expertise that they brought to the series and were aided by Schaeffer's assistant Laura Monti and the general writers' assistant Clay Lapari. Staff writer McDonnell was eventually promoted to story editor. Many of the writers had previous television experience, unlike Schaeffer, which helped her with the initial challenge of crafting the limited series' long-form structure as well as each episode within that larger narrative. Schaeffer believed the story could never have been told with a film format because it needed to establish its sitcom reality with a true television aesthetic before that could be broken.

Schaeffer found the central idea of Wanda being responsible for the sitcom reality to be a simple concept, and felt it would be more compelling if it was revealed through a mystery. This is done by showing Wanda and Vision living in the sitcom reality for the first three episodes before the fourth episode retells those events from a real world perspective to provide answers for viewers. Schaeffer described this as starting in a "grounded" sitcom with Twilight Zone "fraying edges", followed by a bottle episode to explain the early events. How long the series remained in the sitcom reality before giving answers to viewers was a big concern for Schaeffer. Following the "enormous info dump" in the fourth episode, Schaeffer hoped the audience could experience the rest of the series as an "emotional and a psychological journey, rather than a sneaky mystery the whole way". She pitched the rest of the series as mixing sitcom and real world elements until the penultimate episode explores Wanda's history and creation of the sitcom reality, concluding in a big finale with the spectacle of an MCU film. She compared the series to a multi-issue comic book and said it remained very close to her original pitch, which was structured to follow the five stages of grief by starting with denial and ending with acceptance. Ten episodes were originally planned, but this was reworked to nine episodes to improve the "rhythm". The episode titles come from phrases featured in promotions or the opening credits of television series.

==== Characters and universe ====
After receiving Marvel Studios' initial ideas for the series, Schaeffer helped figure out what they meant for the characters. Shakman and Schaeffer watched all the existing MCU footage of Wanda and Vision, including footage that did not make it into the previous MCU films such as unused dailies. While exploring this footage, Schaeffer was drawn to mundane character moments such as Wanda and Vision cooking paprikash in the MCU film Captain America: Civil War (2016) and the two enjoying their time together in Scotland in the film Avengers: Infinity War (2018). Schaeffer said there was a wonder and sincerity to the pair, and felt their family dynamic within a sitcom setting would result in a calm, warm feeling despite the ridiculous premise of the series. She found the pair appealing because they are both outsiders who "find each other. They're both different with capital Ds."

WandaVision begins three weeks after the events of the MCU film Avengers: Endgame (2019), and is set in the fictional town of Westview, New Jersey, which was named as a reference to Feige's hometown of Westfield, New Jersey, but with the initials "W" and "V". The series shows how Wanda grew up in an Eastern European country and formed a love for the black-market DVDs of American sitcoms that her father sold. Schaeffer was excited to use the series to give social commentary while telling a story about character and grief, as she found Wanda's grief to be relatable. A grief counselor was consulted, and Shakman said the entire series was about Wanda learning to process and overcome her grief. Schaeffer was committed to depicting Wanda as a fully realized character, including showing aspects of her that had not been seen much previously in the MCU such as her joy and humor. A great concern for Schaeffer, Livanos, and the writers was avoiding a portrayal of Wanda that made her seem crazy or out of control, as some of her comic book appearances have done, and Schaeffer hoped they gave a "nuanced portrayal of a very complicated woman". Olsen believed Schaeffer was one of the first writers to work with Wanda who understood the "360 of [her] inner and exterior world".

By introducing the "Scarlet Witch" name as a title linked to chaos magic and a preordained destiny, the series was able to further define magic in the MCU beyond what was introduced in the film Doctor Strange (2016) without limiting Wanda's character too much. Witchcraft, the Salem witch trials, and what Schaeffer described as "our sort of Americanized version and feminized version of witches and magic" were all new additions to the MCU after Doctor Strange introduced what Schaeffer felt was "more of a masculine magic". The series also introduces the organization S.W.O.R.D. to the MCU, changing its name from the comic books' Sentient World Observation and Response Department to Sentient Weapon Observation and Response Division. This is due to the organization in the MCU dealing with sentient weapons, such as reconstructing the original Vision with the goal of turning him into a weapon. One of the S.W.O.R.D. agents seen in the series is a grown-up Monica Rambeau, who was introduced to the MCU as an eleven-year-old in the film Captain Marvel (2019). Olsen said Rambeau's material was rewritten during filming as Marvel Studios formed a better understanding of what they wanted to do with the character in the future. Other existing MCU characters Darcy Lewis and Jimmy Woo were added to the series out of the desire to have characters outside of the Hex with a science and law enforcement background, respectively. Initial drafts of the early episodes had more backstory for Lewis that was removed in favor of focusing on the S.W.O.R.D. base when outside of the Hex, though elements of these scenes were added into later episodes. Wanda and Vision's sons Billy and Tommy appear as 10-year-olds in the series. Shakman said there were never plans to make the characters as old as they are in the Young Avengers comic book team since that would deprive Wanda of more time with them.

WandaVision directly sets up Doctor Strange in the Multiverse of Madness (2022), in which Olsen reprises her role as Wanda. Schaeffer said Feige handled the connections between MCU projects, but she and Shakman did have conversations with the creative teams of Multiverse of Madness, Spider-Man: No Way Home (2021), and Marvel Studios' other Disney+ series to discuss the connections between stories and ensure an effortless handoff from WandaVision to the films. Livanos met with Loki executive producers Stephen Broussard and Kevin Wright and What If...? executive producer Brad Winderbaum to establish a "rule book" for the multiverse, its branch timelines, and nexus events. Benedict Cumberbatch was originally planned to reprise his role as Dr. Stephen Strange in the WandaVision finale, but he was written out of the series to avoid him taking focus away from Wanda. The Multiverse of Madness script was rewritten to accommodate this change; the film's writer, Michael Waldron, worked with Schaeffer to do this.

==== Sitcom influences ====
Shakman and Schaeffer said the series was a "love letter to the golden age of television", though it pays tribute to sitcoms from many eras of American television. They chose to focus on family sitcoms over other types, such as workplace sitcoms, because the family aspect kept the series centered, and because Wanda is searching for a family after losing her loved ones in the films. Schaeffer and Shakman studied past sitcoms to learn their "trappings and styles", while avoiding tropes from older sitcoms that would not be acceptable in a modern series. Schaeffer, Shakman, and Feige spoke with Dick Van Dyke, the star of the eponymous 1960s sitcom, to learn about the making of that series. Other sitcoms that inspired the series include I Love Lucy, My Three Sons, Father Knows Best, The Adventures of Ozzie and Harriet, Bewitched, The Brady Bunch, Family Ties, Out of This World, Malcolm in the Middle, Modern Family, and The Office. Meta references are made to Full House, which starred Olsen's older sisters Mary-Kate and Ashley. Before they decided to focus on family sitcoms, an episode of the series was developed based on The Mary Tyler Moore Show that would have explored Wanda's work-life balance. Olsen said the sitcom decade being explored in each episode, and the tropes from that decade that were highlighted, were chosen to connect to where the characters were in the larger story. Each episode was meant to capture key elements of the chosen time period while showing the evolution of sitcoms over time. For example, the first episode pays homage to The Dick Van Dyke Show and I Love Lucy from the 1950s and early 1960s, and was meant to have a general 1950s time period. The changes between decades are explained in the series by changes within the fictional WandaVision program, which Wanda is initially doing subconsciously when something goes wrong in that reality. She later makes these changes consciously. Part of Schaeffer's initial pitch for the series was to link the decade changes to xenophobia from the couple's neighbors, as was seen in some of the characters' comic book appearances, with the neighbors becoming more aggressive each decade until they chase Wanda and Vision out of town. The relationship with the neighbors was ultimately portrayed in a more subtle way that Schaeffer felt was creepier, with elements of psychological horror.

The fictional sitcom features fake commercials that are "slightly nefarious", which Feige said were "part of the truths of the show beginning to leak out". He felt that new viewers would see these as strange versions of commercials from the different sitcom eras, while those well versed in the MCU would be able to see connections to past events. Several commentators believed the commercials were analogies for traumatic events in Wanda's life, which Schaeffer later acknowledged. Shakman said the commercials were a thematic addition that presented Wanda's history while being open to interpretation, and Schaeffer said they were tied to both Wanda's subconscious and the wider MCU in an open-ended way. She added that they gave the series a structure and rhythm that was "part of the fabric of the sitcom aesthetic". An early version of the commercials had "more of an agenda and a function in the plot", with multiple commercials per episode also considered. When Doctor Strange was planned to appear in the series, the commercials would have been his attempts to reach Wanda through the sitcom reality. He would have appeared in the Nexus pharmaceutical commercial in a "blink-and-you-miss-it cameo" as the pharmacist, before his full appearance in the finale.

=== Casting ===
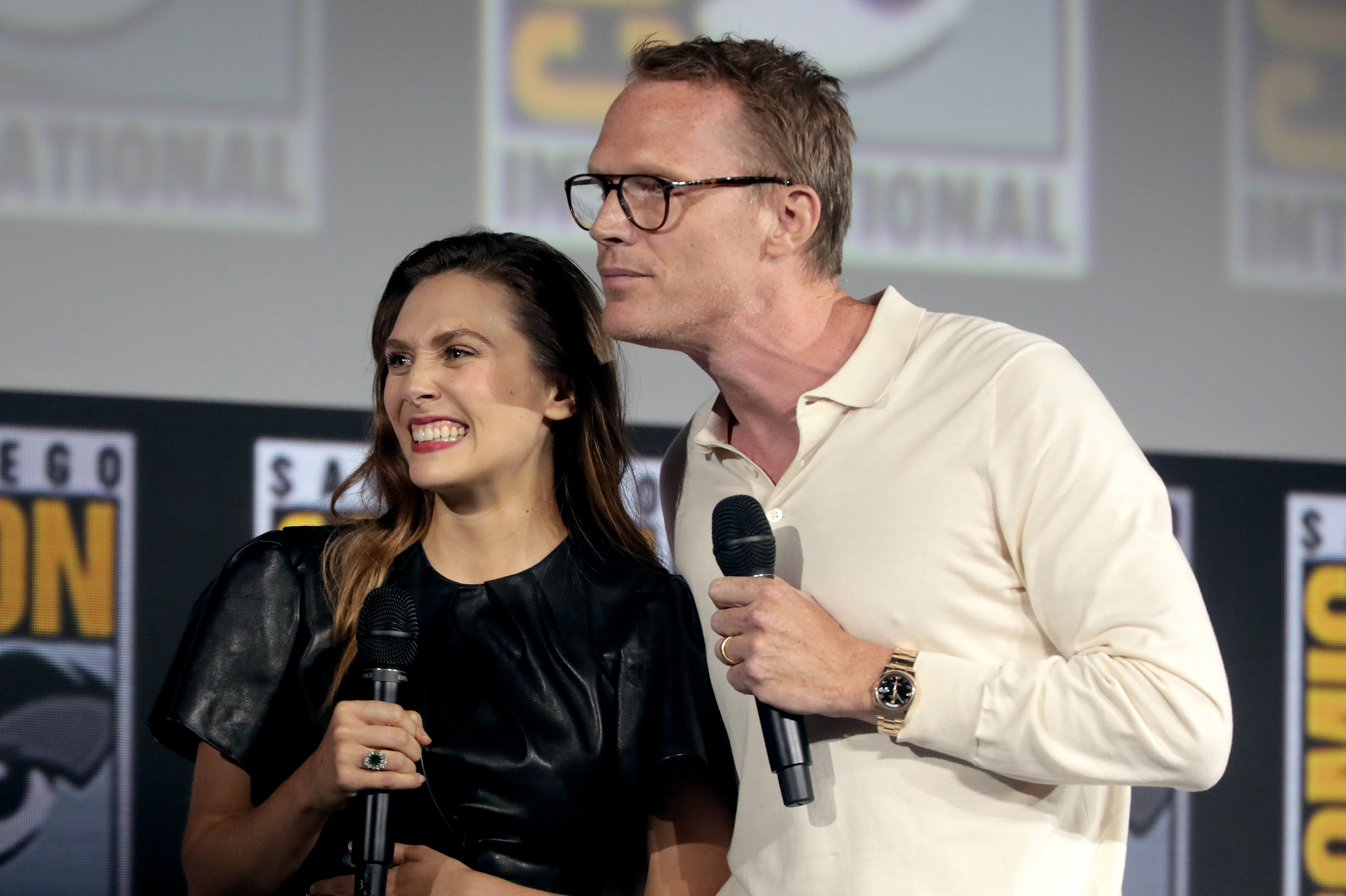
Stars Elizabeth Olsen and Paul Bettany, who reprise their roles from the MCU films, promoting WandaVision at the 2019 San Diego Comic-Con

With the official announcement of the series in April 2019 came confirmation that Olsen and Bettany would reprise their respective roles of Wanda and Vision. Bettany agreed to join the project after meeting with Feige and D'Esposito, who pitched an "exciting and bonkers" idea for his character's return. Feige pitched the series to Olsen during negotiations for her to return in Endgame after Wanda's temporary death in Infinity War. She was initially hesitant about the move to television, wondering if it was a "demotion" from the films, but was excited when she learned of Schaeffer's involvement as well as the comic book storylines that inspired the series. Olsen came to see it as her "wildest screen opportunity yet".

Teyonah Parris was announced in the role of a grown-up Monica Rambeau in July 2019. Rambeau was previously portrayed as an eleven-year-old by Akira Akbar in Captain Marvel, which is set in 1995. The character first appears in WandaVision as "Geraldine" inside the sitcom reality, and Schaeffer had been under the impression that Parris would be announced as playing "Geraldine" to keep the character reveal a surprise. A month later, at Disney's biennial convention D23, Kat Dennings and Randall Park were set to reprise their respective MCU film roles as Darcy Lewis and Jimmy Woo. Dennings had appeared in the films Thor (2011) and Thor: The Dark World (2013), and was surprised and thrilled to be brought back to the MCU for WandaVision after so many years. Park joined the series following a general meeting with Marvel to discuss Woo's MCU future following his introduction in Ant-Man and the Wasp (2018). Schaeffer felt it was fun to feature Dennings and Park since both were veteran sitcom actors, respectively starring in 2 Broke Girls and Fresh Off the Boat.

Also at D23, Kathryn Hahn was announced in the role of Agnes, Wanda and Vision's neighbor. Hahn had been fascinated by the "gasp of human magic" in the MCU, and had a general meeting with Marvel Studios since the studio was also interested in working with her. Shortly after, Marvel suggested Hahn for the role of Agnes to Schaeffer and Shakman, and they agreed that they should cast her. Several days after the general meeting, they contacted Hahn about the series and she said that she "couldn't have dreamt a cooler part", partially due to the sitcom elements. The seventh episode reveals that "Agnes" is actually Agatha Harkness, a character in Marvel Comics.

The official trailer revealed that Fred Melamed and Debra Jo Rupp would appear in the series, portraying Todd and Sharon Davis. They appear as Wanda and Vision's neighbors, "Mr. and Mrs. Hart", within the fictional WandaVision program. Rupp previously had a long-running role in the sitcom That '70s Show and was comfortable with WandaVision's sitcom style. She was asked to join the series by Shakman, who she had worked with at the Geffen Playhouse where Shakman is the artistic director. Similarly, Shakman and Schaeffer offered Melamed the role without him auditioning, and he accepted the role because he was interested by the idea of the series. WandaVision's fifth episode introduces Evan Peters as a "recast" Pietro Maximoff, Wanda's brother. Pietro was previously portrayed in the MCU by Aaron Taylor-Johnson, while Peters played a different version of the character named Peter Maximoff in 20th Century Fox's X-Men film series. Schaeffer stated that it took a while to learn if Peters would be able to be a part of the series, and noted that the creatives did not have a secondary plan if they were not able to use him. The character's "real name" is revealed to be Ralph Bohner in the finale.

Emma Caulfield Ford was cast in October 2019 as Sarah Proctor, who plays "Dottie Jones" in the WandaVision program, after being approached by Schaeffer to audition for the role; they previously worked together on the film Timer (2009). Ford said she was cast in part to help attract genre fans who would recognize her from Buffy the Vampire Slayer, and her involvement was also intended to be a red herring for the series' mysteries. Asif Ali was revealed to be cast in October 2020, as Abilash Tandon who plays Vision's co-worker "Norm", as was Jolene Purdy, cast as Isabel Matsueda who plays Wanda and Vision's neighbor "Beverly".

=== Design ===
==== Colors and sets ====
WandaVision was the first production to have its digital intermediate (DI) work completed at Marvel Studios' new color department, run by Evan Jacobs. Shakman and cinematographer Jess Hall began working with that group before filming to determine the look of each sitcom period that the series was trying to replicate. Shakman and Hall put together a collection of images from existing shows that influenced the framing, composition, and color of each sitcom setting, and Hall created a specific color palette of 20 to 30 colors for each episode based on those reference images so he could control the "visual integrity in color of each episode", a process that he had previously used for the film Ghost in the Shell (2017). Hall worked with Josh Pines of Technicolor SA to create 23 different lookup tables for translating colors into the final look during the DI process, and worked with production designer Mark Worthington and costume designer Mayes C. Rubeo to ensure that the sets and costumes for each episode matched with his color palettes. Shakman said there was a progression of color between each episode of the series, and certain colors were carefully used such as red, which is important to both Wanda and Vision.

Worthington made sets for Wanda and Vision's house in each era, and intended for this to look like one house with the same basic layout that was built in the 1950s and then renovated each decade. Changes were made to this as needed, such as adding the nursery for the third episode, with objects inside the house also updated each decade along with the style of Wanda's red Buick. For the S.W.O.R.D. sets outside of the sitcom reality, Worthington used NASA as an inspiration since S.W.O.R.D. is a space agency, but wanted to create the MCU version of that. He said there were some similarities to previous MCU sets for S.H.I.E.L.D., but the two agencies serve different functions so he wanted to differentiate them. Worthington added that the S.W.O.R.D. base outside Westview was built on a field that was cold and exposed to the weather, while the soundstages for the sitcom sets were warm and dry, which helped with differentiating the ideal sitcom world from the reality outside. Worthington and set decorator Kathy Orlando sourced period-appropriate household items and furniture from secondhand stores in Atlanta, Georgia. Prop designer Russell Bobbit, who was the prop master for many MCU films, also previously worked on the film Pleasantville (1998) which Shakman said the series had a "spiritual connection" to along with The Truman Show (1998).

==== Costumes ====
Rubeo said it was rare for a singular piece of media to progress through so many different decades without its characters aging, and noted that the costumes of the various sitcoms being emulated by the series were not necessarily what was being worn at the time so she was replicating the looks of those series rather than the decades themselves. Around 80 percent of the period costumes were made for the series to fit the actors, with the rest bought or rented from "special [costume] houses" and collections that knew of the fabrics used in the 1950s and 1960s and how garments were constructed then. Olsen enjoyed exploring how women were viewed in society in each decade through Wanda's costumes. Hair stylist Karen Bartek created 22 wigs for the series to represent the different eras from the 1950s to the 1980s, which allowed these different eras to be filmed in one day without needing to re-style the actors' hair. Rubeo added an element of teal to each of Dennings' costumes to match the color of the actress's eyes.

Wanda gets a new superhero costume at the end of the series when she takes on the mantle of the Scarlet Witch. This costume was designed by Andy Park of Marvel Studios' visual development team, and Rubeo worked with Ironhead Studios to create it. She explained that the creatives wanted the costume to be more mature and "weathered" than Wanda's previous costumes, acknowledging what the character has gone through in the MCU so far. They also wanted it to be less revealing and not include a corset or tights, as Olsen had previously expressed concern over her "cleavage corset" costume from the films and the fact that she was the only female superhero in the MCU with such a revealing outfit; Olsen consulted on the design for the new costume. Shakman said the biggest element for discussion was the crown, which they initially thought should be smaller than it is in the comics. They ultimately decided to "go big or go home" with the crown, which is depicted as forming from magical energy before Wanda uses her creation magic to turn it into a solid object. Rubeo worked with shoemaking company Jitterbug Boy to create the boots for Wanda's costume.

To hint that Agnes is really Agatha Harkness, Rubeo designed a medallion with three witches on it that the character wears as a brooch in each episode, except for when she is in aerobics gear in "On a Very Special Episode..." since Rubeo could not find a natural way to integrate the brooch with that outfit. For Agatha's real witch costume, Rubeo wanted to add to the mystery of the character by giving her a dress made from 10 layers of fabric that are each a different color and texture. Hahn worked with Rubeo on the costume design, and said it was intended to honor the character's appearance in the comic books but with a "modern look on top of it".

==== Titles ====
Joe Quesada's variant cover for House of M #1 (L), depicting Wanda Maximoff's "block-like" reality changing abilities from that comic, and a screenshot from WandaVision's end credits (R) which uses a similar style to form the house from the series out of RGB pixels

The series' main title sequence was created by Perception, and starts with a "please stand by" visual in the style of the episode's sitcom era. This is followed by close-ups of footage from the episode on a television screen, which the camera then pushes through to show the RGB pixels that form television images. The pixels are rendered as hexagons, as a reference to Wanda's hex abilities and the informal name "The Hex" that is given to the sitcom reality. The pixels form various elements from the series including Wanda and Vision's house, the baby mobile from the third episode, and the Westview water tower, which is reminiscent of the art style in "House of M". The pixels are then disrupted by a single red pixel that represents Wanda's "world falling apart around her", before forming two wedding rings at the end of the sequence since the series is "at its core a love story". Charles Pulliam-Moore at io9 felt the credits were "undeniably Marvel in the big screen sense", despite WandaVision otherwise attempting to embrace its streaming series format.

Perception also created many of the sitcom-style opening credits for the series, with Shakman saying a lot of work went into creating these openings to be as authentic to each era as possible since the creatives "knew that they were a key part of the storytelling". Additional work from Perception included graphics for the fake commercials, based on real commercials from the different sitcom eras; titles and smoke effects for the Agatha All Along sequence; onscreen locator cards; and two new transitions for the Marvel Studios logo (into black-and-white and a 4:3 aspect ratio for the first episode, and into purple smoke for Agatha's Salem backstory in "Previously On").

=== Filming ===
Filming began in early November 2019, at Pinewood Atlanta Studios in Fayette County, Georgia, with Shakman directing, and Hall serving as cinematographer. The series was filmed under the working title Big Red. The actors went through sitcom "boot camp" before filming, watching episodes of past sitcoms to help learn the tone and style of each era, as well as the different approaches to comedy. Dialect coach Courtney Young helped the actors speak like people from each era, even noting the manners of each decade. Bettany felt the approach to the series was clever since it had to make six hours of content on a budget similar to a two-and-a-half-hour MCU film. This included filming content from different episodes at the same time, though Shakman did try to shoot chronologically to aid the actors with the progression through the sitcom eras.

The first episode filmed for two days in black-and-white and in front of a live studio audience, to mimic sitcom filming in the 1950s. A 4:3 aspect ratio is also used for the black-and-white scenes, and Shakman enjoyed experimenting with the aspect ratio based on the narrative. Scenes set outside the Hex used the 2.40:1 cinematic ratio of many MCU films. Shakman wanted to ensure that the sitcom elements never felt like a parody and were as authentic as possible, since they were a reality that Wanda created to escape from her grief and were real to her. Hall used Arri Alexa 4K HDR cameras for the whole series, to create a coherent look for the story, and to make it easier to switch between different sitcom decades without needing to change the camera setup; era-specific touches such as period-appropriate camera lenses, lighting, and live special effects were used to differentiate the period settings. Hall used 47 different camera lenses for the seven time periods covered in WandaVision, many of which were modern lenses custom modified to keep characteristics of the period lenses. The custom period-appropriate lenses were used on the first three episodes and the fifth, while Hall used the Ultra Panatar lenses that had been used on Infinity War and Endgame for all of the scenes set outside the Hex reality. Tungsten lights were mainly used for the 1950s to the 1970s episodes since those were the lights of the era, with LED lighting used starting in the 2000s episodes which is when those began to be used for real sitcoms. Shakman used lenses, lighting, and sound design inspired by The Twilight Zone to change the mood for moments when something goes wrong with Wanda's illusion.

Location shooting took place in the Atlanta metropolitan area throughout December 2019 and February 2020. A filming wrap party for the series occurred on March 1, ahead of a planned four-week hiatus, but all production halted on March 14 due to the COVID-19 pandemic. Filming resumed in Los Angeles in September 2020 with rigorous COVID-19 safety protocols in place, to complete required backlot and outdoor filming. Olsen found it hard resuming production after being isolated during the shutdown, while Bettany disliked that the safety protocols meant the actors had to return to their trailers when not filming, which he felt removed much of the camaraderie between the cast and crew. External filming for Westview took place on Blondie Street at the Warner Bros. Ranch in Burbank, California, where past sitcoms had also been filmed. Shakman felt the Blondie Street backlot had "that weird sense of fakeness" that no real-life street could replicate. Filming for the Westview town square was originally planned for the Universal Studios Lot near Blondie Street, but this could not happen due to scheduling and the pandemic so filming for those scenes instead took place at the Golden Oak Ranch. Production on the series wrapped by mid-November, with Olsen shooting back-to-back with Doctor Strange in the Multiverse of Madness.

=== Editing ===
When the production shut down due to the pandemic, Marvel took around a month to figure out the logistics of remote work. Post-production then continued on existing footage, which informed Shakman of how to approach a few things differently once filming began again, though the series was not creatively altered by this. Post-production continued after filming resumed, and Shakman said working on every step of the process at once felt "schizophrenic". Tim Roche, Zene Baker, and Nona Khodai served as editors for the series, and each brought different experience to the project: Baker previously edited Thor: Ragnarok; Khodai previously worked on the superhero series The Boys; and Roche came from a background editing comedy series with no visual effects. The editors agreed to treat the series like an MCU film since they knew Marvel Studios would not "resort to [standard television series] money-saving tactics for a show like this", and Baker said editing the series was no different from editing Ragnarok.

The editors did not have formal meetings to discuss the series' tone, but did work together on issues. Roche felt the series' tone was most interesting when the sitcom and MCU elements were mixed together, such as when Vision discovers anomalies in Westview during "All-New Halloween Spooktacular!" Aspect ratio shifts were created during post-production to give Shakman control over the lengths of the transitions, with some of the earlier aspect ratio changes going through many variations to find the best length and style and have a bigger impression on the audience. Transitions in later episodes are sometimes just a straight cut from one ratio to another, relying more on music and sound to show the change. Some scenes were rearranged to avoid changing between aspect ratios too many times and distracting from the story. One of the most discussed elements of editing was the laugh track, and the creatives worked with sound engineer and laugh track historian Paul Iverson to explain how laugh tracks changed throughout time which informed the sound design. Iverson provided the editing team with a selection of laughter track recordings used in sitcoms of the 1950s and through the eras.

Previsualization company The Third Floor, Inc. added temporary effects to edited sequences as a guide for visual effects vendors. These were also sent to the DI team to finalize the coloring of shots before the visual effects were completed, which Baker said was unusual and done to save time but did not have much of an effect on the production's timeline. The editors all worked on the sitcom opening titles and fake commercials in their episodes, as well as the "previously on WandaVision" segments that begin each episode. The latter have some differences from the episodes they are recapping, such as slightly different dialogue, which plays into Wanda's manipulation of reality. Later episodes were not completed when the early ones began airing, so the editors were able to see fan theories about the series while they were still working on it. This made them question some of their decisions, but there was no time for this to have any creative effect on their work. Editing for the final episode was completed two weeks before it aired.

=== Visual effects ===
Tara DeMarco served as the visual effects supervisor for WandaVision, with visual effects vendors for the series including Digital Domain, Framestore, Industrial Light & Magic (ILM), Lola VFX, Monsters Aliens Robots Zombies (MARZ), RISE, Rodeo FX, SSVFX, The Yard VFX, and Zoic Studios. The series has 3,010 visual effects shots, more than the 2,496 in Avengers: Endgame, though DeMarco noted that the series is longer than Endgame and that film had a lot of effects that were much more complex than many of those seen in WandaVision. The creatives tried to keep the number of visual effects in each episode to a minimum until the 2000s-set episodes where it made sense to allow more prevalent visual effects due to the technology available at the time; each episode has more visual effects shots than the previous one, building up to the "big Marvel finale" in the last episode. For the first three episodes, contemporary visual effects were used to augment on-set practical effects and replicate other period-specific effects.

DeMarco took inspiration from the Scarlet Witch: Witches' Road comic book for the look of Wanda and Agatha's magic in the series. Wanda's magic was created based on Olsen's on-set hand movements, with the visual effects team letting her create the movements that she wanted and then adding "something tasteful with her hands that isn't distracting from her performance". The look of her magic initially matches the same red energy that was seen in the films, but becomes a darker, richer red when she starts using chaos magic to signify that it is more powerful. This look was developed with Digital Domain, who primarily worked on the final episode and contributed 350 visual effect shots over 14 months. Framestore, who worked on 99 visual effects shots for the series, developed the look of Agatha's magic, which is a purple version of Wanda's magic with a black, ink-like texture added to make it appear more evil. Mr. X contributed 152 visual effects shots for the scenes in the final two episodes featuring a coven of witches.

Visual effects progression showing the process to create Vision for the series (example from "Don't Touch That Dial"), depicting (L to R) Bettany on set wearing a bald cap, blue face makeup, and tracking markers; several iterations of the tracking markers being removed and sections of his face being replaced with CGI; and the final frame from the episode in black-and-white.

DeMarco used Vision's introduction in Avengers: Age of Ultron (2015), which was primarily created by Lola VFX, as the definitive version of the character when approaching his visual effects for WandaVision. Close-ups of the character in Infinity War were also referenced. Bettany wore prosthetics over his ears to portray the character in the films, but these were replaced with CGI in post-production and were not actually needed. For the series, Bettany asked not to wear the prosthetics so he could hear better on set and be more comfortable. He instead wore a bald cap and face makeup to match Vision's color, with the blue color used for Vision in the black-and-white episodes suggested by Lola VFX supervisor Trent Claus based on his knowledge of the makeup used for I Love Lucy. The series' second visual effects supervisor, Sarah Elm, focused on Vision's effects and came to know what parts of Bettany's face needed to be kept and replaced to match the character's look in the films while retaining Bettany's performance. Multiple vendors worked on Vision for the series, and they were allowed to use their own methodologies for the character as long as the result was consistent. They generally used complex 3D and digital makeup techniques to create the character, with sections of Bettany's face replaced with CGI on a shot-by-shot basis; the actor's eyes, nose, and mouth were usually the only elements retained. Vision's skin needed to move to match with Bettany's performance, and sometimes specular highlights from the makeup were kept for the digital version, but it was not intended to look like actual skin with makeup on it and does not have pores or wrinkles. Digital contact lenses were applied over Bettany's eyes to create the "complex digital radial graphics" that Vision's eyes have, though these were not added for the first three episodes to give Vision a more "wholesome" look during those sitcom periods. The visual effects artists also had to manually fix the backgrounds around Vision's head since he has a narrower head than Bettany and has no ears. MARZ, SSVFX, and Lola VFX were the primary vendors for Vision's face in the sitcom reality, while Digital Domain created a full digital version of the character for the final episode which they shared with other vendors for use in earlier episodes. They also created a full model for White Vision.

Rodeo FX spent nine months developing the visual effects for the Hex boundary and worked on 348 shots across most of the series' episodes. DeMarco said the Hex was meant to look like it was made of the "cathodic lines of old tube TVs and pixelization and a lot of cool RGB chromatic aberration effects", with photography that had "the language of television" also referenced for the design. Rodeo tried using point cloud technology to create the effect, but this only worked well for dark backgrounds. The boundary is initially clear and difficult to see, but turns red once Wanda emerges from the boundary in "On a Very Special Episode..." to reflect her anger and reinforce that it is a hard barrier. Rodeo was also responsible for the sequence where Vision attempts to leave the Hex in "All-New Halloween Spooktacular!" and begins to disintegrate, and the scene where Rambeau enters the Hex and gains superpowers in "Breaking the Fourth Wall". ILM handled the creation of the Hex and Vision in "Previously On", and also the effect of them disappearing in "The Series Finale". Cantina Creative designed and animated graphics for different monitors and devices such as S.W.O.R.D.'s holographic table. A number of final visual effects were reportedly added to the series after it had premiered.

=== Music ===
External videos
- Marvel Studios' WandaVision Final End Credits Main On End Title Sequence presents the end credit sequence created by Perception with composer Christophe Beck's theme, YouTube video from Perception's channel

In January 2020, Christophe Beck announced that he would compose the score for the series, after previously scoring Ant-Man (2015) and Ant-Man and the Wasp. He paid homage to the sitcoms in each time period through his instrumentation, compositional style, and period-specific recording and mixing techniques. Earlier episodes feature small orchestral ensembles, with later episodes having more of a rock-pop style, and the music becoming more pervasive as the series progresses. He had hoped to match the spotting of each sitcom era as well, but found that this would not always work due to modern audiences expecting more music than older sitcoms would have included. Beck's frequent collaborator Michael Paraskevas composed additional music, as did Alex Kovacs, with Kovacs hired due to his experience with older orchestration techniques and jazz music which Beck found helpful when writing for the series' early episodes. Beck was more comfortable once the episodes required music inspired by the 1980s and 1990s. To connect the music for the different sitcom eras, as well as the more traditional music for outside the sitcom reality, he composed several themes that are used in the different styles, which was possible since he knew where the series and characters were going from the beginning. He was most excited for the opportunity to write a definitive theme for Wanda that is heard during the series' end credits, which he hoped other composers would reprise for the character's future MCU appearances. Beck also wrote a love theme for Wanda and Vision that he said would convey feelings of love, tragedy, and sadness, which he compared to the romance music he composed for the series Buffy the Vampire Slayer.

In December 2020, Robert Lopez and Kristen Anderson-Lopez were announced to have written theme songs for some of the series' episodes. They were approached for the series in mid-2019 by Shakman, who was friends with Lopez at college, and they had previously worked with Beck on the music for Disney's Frozen franchise. To help sell the series to the couple, Shakman referenced the Adult Swim short Too Many Cooks, which the couple were aware of and called one of their favorite sketches. The couple were inspired by the theme songs from past sitcoms as well as the music from James Bond films, composer Burt Bacharach, and jazz pianist and composer Dave Brubeck. To tie their themes together, Lopez and Anderson-Lopez created a four-note motif that worked in each of the theme song styles. The motif begins with an octave, followed by a tritone, which is also known as "the devil's interval"; this was their way of saying musically that the series was a "big bright-colored swing while also being really unsettling". Lopez described the motif as "kind of like the WandaVision call-out, easily identifiable in some way in each song" that was incorporated in different ways each time. The pair used their knowledge of sitcoms from watching them as they grew up, and found the 1990s to be the most challenging era to write a theme song for due to them both being at college during that decade when they did not have a television, while the 1980s was their favorite. Anderson-Lopez added that it was challenging to ensure the themes were not "parodying any one show" but "would evoke all of the iconic songs from an entire decade and be their own thing". She also felt it was their job with the theme songs to establish the tone, place, and time of the episodes in lieu of title cards providing such information. The couple sang on many of the theme songs, something they normally do not do for the final versions of their songs, which Anderson-Lopez attributed in part to the pandemic. They were joined by a group of backup singers for some of the songs.

Beck chose to align the style and instrumentation of some of the episodes' music to the theme songs of those episodes, and tried to include motifs from the songs in the background score wherever possible. His music was recorded with a 75-player orchestra at Synchron Stage in Vienna, and he completed work on the series in February 2021. Soundtrack albums for each episode, including Beck's score and the theme songs by Lopez and Anderson-Lopez, were released digitally by Marvel Music and Hollywood Records from January 22 to March 12, 2021, one week after each episode premiered. One of the theme songs, "Agatha All Along", went viral after appearing in "Breaking the Fourth Wall", peaking at number one on iTunes' Soundtrack chart, reaching fifth on iTunes' Top 100 singles chart, and debuted on Billboard's Digital Song Sales chart at number 36. It also earned the Primetime Emmy Award for Outstanding Original Music and Lyrics and was nominated for the Grammy Award for Best Song Written for Visual Media.

== Marketing ==
Disney's marketing team conceived its campaign for the series roughly a year-and-a-half before its release. At the 2019 D23, Olsen confirmed that the series would mix elements of classic sitcoms with the MCU, which was shown in a teaser that combined footage of Wanda and Vision from previous MCU films with images from old sitcoms The Dick Van Dyke Show and Father Knows Best. The series was promoted as part of Expanding the Universe, a Marvel Studios special that debuted on Disney+ on November 12, 2019. In December, Feige debuted the first image from the series at Comic Con Experience. Vinnie Mancuso of Collider said it was "very interesting", highlighting the "old-school black and white" coloring. A commercial for the series and fellow Marvel Studios Disney+ series The Falcon and the Winter Soldier and Loki was shown during Super Bowl LIV. Inverse's Dais Johnston found visual references to past sitcoms in the commercial, including The Dick Van Dyke Show, Leave It to Beaver, Bewitched, The Brady Bunch, Roseanne, and Full House. They thought the series would be a "must-see" for Marvel fans as well as "anyone looking for a hit of nostalgia: the era-spanning framework means anyone can relive the shows of their childhood". Julia Alexander of The Verge said the footage "wasn't much" but offered "enough glimpses to tease fans". Haleigh Foutch at Collider felt of all the Super Bowl commercials, Marvel's "stole the whole show". She was most excited by the "utterly strange and unpredictable looking" WandaVision footage.

The series' official trailer was released on September 20, 2020, during the 72nd Primetime Emmy Awards. The trailer received 55.7 million online views within 24 hours, including 36.1 million on YouTube, 4.9 million on Facebook, and 10.1 million on Instagram, which was believed to be the highest number ever for a streaming television series trailer. WandaVision also had over 302,600 social mentions, trending on Twitter immediately after a teaser aired during the Emmy Awards ahead of the full trailer's release, and ultimately trending fourth on Twitter. The trailer was the number two trending video on YouTube. Ethan Anderton from /Film said the footage in the trailer looked like "one of the most trippy Marvel projects to date". He also noted more lighthearted aspects of the trailer such as Vision wearing a Halloween costume of the character's comic book design. Matt Patches at Polygon called the trailer "a hoot, full of bright colors and odd behavior", adding that it still left much of the series a mystery. Comic Book Resources' Noah Dominguez said the trailer "offers quite a bit in terms of content" with "a vivid look at some of the visual tricks on display". Charles Pulliam-Moore of io9 called the trailer's use of "Twilight Time" by The Platters "the most haunting" of all of its strange features, and felt the trailer's editing created "the effect of rapidly flipping through television channels in search of something good to watch". The Hollywood Reporter's Richard Newby described the trailer as "jam-packed with information" and felt that it "gives fans quite a lot to look forward to, as well as some mysteries to ponder over leading up to the premiere". After actors from past Spider-Man films were revealed to be appearing in Spider-Man: No Way Home, Graeme McMillan of The Hollywood Reporter saw the series' official trailer "in a new light", suggesting the different versions of Wanda and Vision that appear in the series were because of Wanda "breaking down walls between different realities", which could set up Doctor Strange in the Multiverse of Madness and Spider-Man: No Way Home.

In early December, six posters for the series were released daily, each depicting a decade from the 1950s through the 2000s. Pulliam-Moore noted that with each new poster, "different elements shift and morph, both reflecting the passage of time and WandaVision's plot developments". The release of the posters was followed by a new trailer that debuted at Disney's Investors Day presentation. Anderton noted for /Film that the trailer featured more non-sitcom-inspired footage than previously seen, with "a lot to soak in". Chaim Gartenberg at The Verge called the new trailer "mind-bending", while Tom Reimann of Collider described it as "delightfully weird" and drew comparisons to the "House of M" comic book storyline. Tony Sokol at Den of Geek highlighted the trailer's use of The Monkees' song "Daydream Believer", believing the title and lyrics reflected Wanda's mental state well even though the music becomes "barely recognizable under increasing layers of psychedelic weirdness". The trailer received 9 million views on YouTube. The first two episodes of the series Marvel Studios: Legends, released on January 8, 2021, explore Wanda and Vision using footage from their MCU film appearances.

Including the aforementioned trailers, the series' marketing campaign across outdoor, digital, television, and magazine advertisements yielded 2.14 billion impressions. Analytics firm RelishMix determined the social reach for the series within its "social media universe" was 263,000, which was "lightyears ahead of most streaming shows". The various trailers, ads, and interviews posted to YouTube garnered the most awareness and engagement for WandaVision, with RelishMix noting that content posted to Marvel, Disney, and Disney+'s official channels was then reposted on fan channels. Leading up to the premiere, advertisements, "special-look stunt interstitials, co-branded takeovers, on-air graphic integrations, in-show integrations, and custom talent content" appeared on the various channels and assets of Walt Disney Television, ESPN, and Hulu, while billboards were seen in major cities such as New York and Los Angeles. Talent and influencers were sent a "TV-dinner box that had a custom TV tray, utensil set, coasters, drinking glasses, and a [custom] journal designed to look like a vintage TV Guide". A "never-before-done 'reality bending' grid that updates on its own" was created for the series' Instagram account, with Disney's marketing team uploading each post in a specific order while the account was private and then archiving them. Once the account became public, the different posts were un-archived and re-archived to show a different grid of images for each episode. Custom emojis on Twitter updated each week as WandaVision progressed through the decades.

In January 2021, Marvel announced their "Marvel Must Haves" program, which revealed new toys, games, books, apparel, home decor, and other merchandise related to each episode of WandaVision each Monday from January 18 to March 8, 2021. Additional "Must Haves" merchandise was revealed on May 10, 2021. From late February 2021 until the series concluded in early March, Marvel partnered with chef Justin Warner to release recipes for food featured in, or inspired by, each episode. In June 2021, Hyundai Motor Company released a commercial featuring Olsen as Wanda promoting WandaVision and the Hyundai Tucson. The commercial was produced by Marvel alongside similar commercials for The Falcon and the Winter Soldier, Loki, and What If...?, and was meant to tell an "in-world" story set within the narrative of the series.

In July 2023, Manta Lab announced limited edition SteelBooks for the series with various accessories such as postcards, character cards, and stickers. DVD or Blu-ray discs were not included with the SteelBooks, as it was not an official home media release from Walt Disney Studios Home Entertainment.

== Release ==
=== Streaming ===
WandaVision premiered on Disney+ on January 15, 2021, with its first two episodes. The other seven episodes were released weekly until March 5. Marvel Studios originally planned to release the first three episodes at once, but decided against this because the final episode would not have been completed in time for that release schedule. They also considered releasing the entire series at once, but chose weekly releases after seeing the success that the Disney+ Star Wars series The Mandalorian had with that approach. The episodes were subsequently structured with the weekly release in mind, with Feige explaining that they wanted viewers to try to "guess what happens next, to have a week speculating or rewatching and building that anticipation". He felt binge-watching the series after all the episodes were released would be an "equally fun experience".

According to Shakman, the series was able to premiere so soon after filming ended because post-production work had already begun during the series' COVID-19 production shutdown. Schaeffer felt the series was "suited to [being released during] this moment in time", amidst the pandemic, because it is a "reflection of a lot of the anxiety that we're feeling, and a lot of the pathos and chaos of [2020], so it feels very right to me". Esquire's Matt Miller felt WandaVision had incredible timing with its release since much of the audience was "collectively escaping to nostalgia to cope with a pandemic and the general chaos of the real world". He also felt WandaVision was "commenting on the very nature and purpose of consuming comic book entertainment". The series was originally set for release in early 2021, before being moved forward to a December 2020 release in February 2020. It was then moved back to the early 2021 slot in November 2020. It is the first series in, and the start of, Phase Four of the MCU.

=== Home media ===
WandaVision was released on Ultra HD Blu-ray and Blu-ray by Walt Disney Studios Home Entertainment on November 28, 2023, with SteelBook packaging and concept art cards. Bonus features include "Through the Eras" with the cast and crew, along with a look at the spin-off series Agatha All Along; deleted scenes; a gag reel; and the Marvel Studios: Assembled documentary special "The Making of WandaVision".

== Reception ==
=== Viewership ===
WandaVision was Disney+'s most-watched series premiere on its opening weekend, ahead of the second season of The Mandalorian, until Disney+ announced that it had been surpassed by the series premiere of The Falcon and the Winter Soldier in March 2021. When compared to other streaming series in each week of its release, WandaVision did not have the highest number of minutes viewed using Nielsen Media Research's measurements. Scott Mendelson of Forbes felt that this could be attributed to WandaVision's weekly release schedule, and opined that Disney accepted this in exchange for the continued discussions and coverage that the weekly release had given to event series such as Game of Thrones and The Mandalorian. According to analytics provider TVision, who count U.S. viewers on connected televisions who have watched at least two minutes within a session of watching content for at least five minutes, WandaVision was the most viewed title of January 2021 across all major U.S. streaming and advertising video on demand services. The series had an 8,127 indexed audience size, which was 81 times more views than the average series measured by the service. Nielsen reported that WandaVision was the fourteenth most-streamed original series of 2021, accumulating 7.2 billion minutes of watch time. According to the file-sharing news website TorrentFreak, WandaVision was the most-pirated television series of 2021.

=== Critical response ===
WandaVision: Critical reception by episode
Percentage of positive critics' reviews tracked by the website Rotten Tomatoes

The review aggregator website Rotten Tomatoes reported a 92% approval rating with an average rating of 7.80/10, based on 433 reviews. The site's critical consensus reads, "Part loving homage to TV history, part off-kilter mystery, WandaVision is a wonderfully weird and strikingly bold step into the small screen for the MCU—and a perfect showcase for Elizabeth Olsen and Paul Bettany." Metacritic, which uses a weighted average, assigned a score of 77 out of 100 based on 43 critics, indicating "generally favorable reviews".

The first three episodes were given to critics to review the series ahead of its premiere, and TVLine's Rebecca Iannucci gave them an "A", praising WandaVision for deviating from the expectations of an MCU story. Daniel Fienberg of The Hollywood Reporter said it was "creatively courageous" for an action-focused franchise to make a "postmodern exploration of sitcom conventions" that its core fans may not enjoy. Shirley Li at The Atlantic praised the series' small stakes and focus on Wanda's grief and trauma, giving the character a chance to process loss in a way that superhero films generally do not allow. Caroline Framke, writing for Variety, was more critical of the series, believing it would be too confusing for casual fans and stating that it was not as good at being a sitcom as the series it was copying. She preferred when it focused on its underlying mysteries. Dominic Patten of Deadline Hollywood was also critical, describing it as a "baby boomer punchline in search of a joke" and believing that Marvel Television's Netflix series and ABC's Agents of S.H.I.E.L.D. were better.

Many critics praised the recreation of sitcom styles and tropes. Iannucci felt WandaVision was able to perfectly encapsulate the sitcoms it was replicating, and this helped make its mystery elements compelling during the first three episodes. Richard Roeper of the Chicago Sun-Times described the series as a "painstakingly crafted, impressively spot-on tribute to the evolution of the American sitcom", and gave it 3.5 stars out of 4, while Melanie McFarland at Salon said the creative team had recreated the sitcoms with "admirable precision", and especially praised Shakman's work. She did question whether the unique style of the first three episodes would be maintained until the end of the series, but felt it was going to be worth watching it all either way. Li and Slant Magazine's Niv M. Sultan both felt it was likely that the series would move towards a more traditional MCU format, but still praised the sitcom elements in the early episodes. Roxana Hadadi at RogerEbert.com was less positive about the sitcom elements and the way they had "sidelined" Wanda and Vision. Hadadi questioned what role the sitcom recreations played in the story and character development, which was not clear in the first three episodes. Michael Phillips, writing for the Chicago Tribune, was critical of the sitcom tropes themselves, such as "canned and deadly" laugh tracks, as well as the episodes' pacing, though he went on to enjoy episodes four through seven more because he felt those sitcom elements were a better fit for the cast.

Reviewing the full series for Polygon, Joshua Rivera criticized its ending for setting up future MCU projects rather than resolving its own story. He said the series' biggest success was not being interested in heroism or justifying Wanda's actions, but felt it had undermined its exploration of Wanda's grief by not exploring Rambeau's grief as well. Rolling Stone's Alan Sepinwall and Entertainment Weekly's Chancellor Agard also expressed concern with the series' focus on setting up other MCU stories in its finale, but both felt that this did not take away from the series' success. Agard enjoyed the series' lower-stakes goals of exploring grief and developing Wanda into a fully fleshed-out character in a way that previous MCU films had never done. He gave the full series a "B+". Sepinwall praised the series for its use of "narrative form to serve emotional function" and expressed hope that Marvel Studios would continue to experiment with its MCU projects in a similar way. Zaki Hasan at the San Francisco Chronicle felt WandaVision worked as both an installment in the MCU franchise and also as an "introspective tale", with an ending that was "honest with its audience [and] true to itself". He also felt that it was a story suited to serialized television, with the central mysteries giving way to "meditations on love and loss" across its episodes. Matt Purslow from IGN gave the series an 8 out of 10 and praised it as a bold change for the MCU that was unlike any other mainstream television series. He felt the series' biggest flaw was the fact that its emotional stakes were kept a mystery for so long, but with hindsight he praised the structure of the series' episodes which had no formula and made "each installment feel like a genuinely new adventure".

The performances of Olsen, Bettany, Hahn, and Parris were all praised by critics, and the roles of Dennings and Park as comic relief were also appreciated. Sam Barsanti of The A.V. Club said the series' greatest strength was the way it took established MCU characters and put them into a new kind of story for the franchise. Olsen received particular praise, with Iannucci describing the series as an opportunity for the actress to showcase her acting skills, and Feinberg calling it a better "acting vehicle" than Olsen's roles in the MCU films. Framke praised the way Olsen balanced her existing portrayal of Wanda with the series' sitcom influences, and felt the series would not work without a "nuanced actor like Olsen tethering it to some kind of reality". Purslow highlighted Olsen's "chameleon-like ability" to replicate the performances of actresses from the different sitcom eras while also providing the required "heft" for the character's more dramatic scenes. Discussing the series for The Ringer, Alison Herman praised it for focusing on Olsen as Wanda and exploring themes of grief, motherhood, and the history of gender in media without being marketed as a female-focused superhero series. She described WandaVision as a "piece of mass entertainment that's centered on women and adds depth as a result, but doesn't demand up front to be read as such".

=== Analysis ===
==== Theories and speculation ====
After the first three episodes, Iannucci questioned if the series would have been better suited releasing its episodes all at once as opposed to weekly. William Hughes of The A.V. Club agreed, believing that the slowly-revealed "mystery-box" format was "in direct opposition to the MCU ethos, which can tolerate a mystery for exactly as long as it takes its antsiest audience member to start to squirm. To withhold information—to withhold anything—is counter to what turned these films into a pop culture institution, and that necessity to provide gives WandaVision the sense of a show being pulled in even more directions than its already bifurcated premise might suggest." Hughes also felt that the less subtle mystery clues, such as changes in cinematography style, were distracting from the "legitimately wonderful work [that the series'] leads are doing in their homage to classic comedy styles". Miles Surrey, writing for The Ringer, disagreed with Hughes, thinking the series understood the expectations of the audience by explaining the mysteries that the audience was likely already deducing in the fourth episode. Surrey added that WandaVision "isn't really trying to hide what it's about, but that works to the show's advantage. The series is getting better—and way creepier—the more it draws the curtain... [paving] the way for Marvel to make a concerted effort to dabble with horror; at least by the MCU's standards."

The series' mystery elements and use of red herrings led to many theories that were widely discussed. These red herrings included the character "Dottie", and elements of the sets and visual effects. Recurring imagery such as hexagons was also identified and analyzed. The casting of Peters as "Pietro Maximoff" was particularly discussed, with many fans believing that his role was related to the multiverse and indicated a crossover with the X-Men film series; speculation also arose that additional members of the X-Men would appear in the series. The fact that this was not the case led Carlos Morales of IGN to describe the casting as unnecessary and a "hollow move, because it simultaneously dilutes what should be an important character beat into an 'I know him!' cameo, while also opening up a well of speculation that doesn't really go anywhere." Schaeffer defended the casting, explaining that it was not meant to feel like a prank and instead was done as part of the series' larger exploration of Wanda's grief. She added that using another actor was "not going to have the same thrill, and craziness, and questions, and be as disorienting". Screen Rant's Daniel Gillespie agreed, and called the casting a smart move that helped spark discussion of the series which might not have happened with another actor. Adam B. Vary from Variety felt the casting was a good joke, but pointed out that it only worked if the viewer knew Peters had previously portrayed Peter Maximoff in the X-Men films. This is where Vary felt the series "got itself into some trouble" since "all kinds of multiverse shenanigans seemed to be at play, and the serious (and seriously online) fandom took that and sprinted with it".

Other theories that fans and commentators speculated about include an aerospace engineer mentioned by Rambeau turning out to be an existing Marvel Comics character such as Reed Richards of the Fantastic Four; Benedict Cumberbatch reprising his role as Stephen Strange; and the Marvel Comics character Mephisto being the series' secret villain. These theories did not pan out, though it was later revealed that there were early plans for Cumberbatch to appear in the series. Schaeffer felt the series never presented the expectations that any of this speculation would be part of the series, and believed that it delivered on the expectations and promises it did make. Collider's Carly Lane agreed with this sentiment, believing the series never strayed from the story it set out to tell, adding that WandaVision's weekly release allowed viewers to create "expectation over what they hoped the show would satisfy, rather than focusing on what it actually gave us". Lane concluded that there was nothing inherently wrong with fan theories, but equating a rewarding experience to how many theories come true "overlooks all of the places where the story has already succeeded".

==== Grief and nostalgia ====
Trauma therapist Erin Qualey felt WandaVision was a positive representation of complex mental health issues in media, stating the exploration of Wanda's grief in the series made her "quickly become one of the most relatable characters on television" in the COVID-19 era, in which many were living with similar traumas. Qualey added, "By exploring how the process of admitting weakness can become an inherent strength, Wanda's story marks a refreshing, if temporary, departure from the usual comic book formula", and enjoyed that the series was exploring a person's internal struggles that people could relate to, rather than relying on a catastrophic event or fighting villains for spectacle. Speaking to a moment in the eighth episode when Vision likens grief to love persevering, Qualey said it was fantastic that Marvel "took an earnest pause to convey this sentiment".

Candace Davison of PureWow initially dismissed the series and its replication of sitcom tropes as a "cheesy superhero show", but ultimately found it to be a "powerful allegory for living through loss and extreme trauma, and in some ways, it mirrors how we're all coping with [COVID-19] pandemic life". Davison had seen the series as a "gimmicky play on shows from different decades", but by its end she was discussing how Wanda's sitcom reality was a way of coping with her trauma. She compared this to the comedy series The Office being the most-streamed series of 2020 when audiences were looking for comfort and escapism. Gayle Sequeira at Film Companion also discussed how the sitcom nostalgia was not just a gimmick, noting that the series shows Wanda's parents using sitcoms as a coping mechanism for their family in war-torn Sokovia, and Wanda then uses the same strategy herself during traumatic moments of her adult life. Sequeira also discussed how the series examines this coping mechanism, stating, "The show does champion entertainment as a safe and welcoming space for those looking for an escape, but it also acts as a cautionary tale for those who employ it as an unhealthy coping mechanism... The show's release during a global pandemic, a time when people are turning to entertainment as a means of coping more than ever, drives home the point."

At io9, Charles Pulliam-Moore called the series a "quirky character study" for Vision since the series has allowed him to "inhabit his identities as a hero, a goofball, and a loving husband" wrapped in the construct of an American sitcom. Pulliam-Moore was particularly fascinated by Vision becoming a father, given he "toils at a job he doesn't understand, checks when things go bump in the night, and does his best to take care of chores around the house before [Wanda] can get to them with her magic", all to ensure Wanda stays happy in their charade. He also felt the series was being purposeful with its exploration of romance and intimacy, which he felt was "largely missing" from superhero films.

=== Accolades ===
WandaVision was nominated for eight Primetime Emmy Awards and fifteen Primetime Creative Arts Emmy Awards (winning three Creative Arts Emmys), as well as one American Film Institute Award (won), one Annie Award, one Art Directors Guild Award (won), four Critics' Choice Television Awards, one Directors Guild of America Award, two Golden Globe Awards, one Grammy Award, one Hugo Award, one Nebula Award (won), four People's Choice Awards, one Producers Guild of America Award, four TCA Awards, three Visual Effects Society Awards, and one Writers Guild of America Award, among others.

Bettany and Hahn were widely considered to be the front-runners to win Outstanding Lead Actor and Outstanding Supporting Actress in a Limited or Anthology Series or Movie, respectively, at the Emmys, with their losses deemed a surprise, along with the series only receiving wins at the Creative Arts Emmys. The series is one of 117 television series that received the ReFrame Stamp for the years 2020 to 2021. The stamp is awarded by the gender equity coalition ReFrame as a "mark of distinction for projects that ... hire female-identifying people in four out of eight critical areas of production" to show progress in gender-balanced television production.

== Documentary special ==
In February 2021, the documentary series Marvel Studios: Assembled was announced. The series' first special, "The Making of WandaVision", explores the making of the series, with Schaeffer, Shakman, Olsen, Bettany, Rupp, Hahn, Parris, Park, Dennings, Peters, and others discussing the classic sitcoms that inspired the series, how the crew emulated the production processes of early sitcoms, and the experience of filming in front of a live studio audience. The special was released on Disney+ on March 12, 2021, and was included as part of the series' home media release on November 28, 2023.

== Future ==
=== Continuation ===
In January 2021, Schaeffer said she was unable to talk about any potential plans for a second season, but said the series would feel complete. Shakman said there were no plans for a second season and one would only be made if a specific story came about that would warrant it. In June 2021, Olsen said WandaVision was a limited series.

Feige did not rule out a second season, but said one was not planned and WandaVision's story would instead be continued in the film Doctor Strange in the Multiverse of Madness, among other places: Parris reprised her role as Rambeau in the film The Marvels (2023), the sequel to Captain Marvel, which was co-written by WandaVision writer Megan McDonnell.

=== Spin-offs ===
WandaVision serves as the start of a trilogy of series that includes Agatha All Along and VisionQuest. Winderbaum said the trilogy was about parenthood, with Agatha All Along dealing with themes of motherhood and VisionQuest dealing with themes of fatherhood.

==== Agatha All Along ====
By October 2021, a "dark comedy" spin-off series was in development with Hahn returning to reprise her role as Agatha Harkness and Schaeffer returning as writer and executive producer. Schaeffer, who serves as showrunner, also directed episodes of the series, along with Gandja Monteiro and Rachel Goldberg. Hahn's involvement was part of a larger deal with Marvel Studios to reprise her role in series and films. Marvel Studios officially announced the series in November 2021. Other actors reprising their WandaVision roles include Ford, Rupp, Payton, Lengel, Ali, Glick, Forbes, and Peters, starring alongside Joe Locke, Sasheer Zamata, Ali Ahn, Maria Dizzia, Paul Adelstein, Miles Gutierrez-Riley, Okwui Okpokwasili, Patti LuPone, and Aubrey Plaza. Locke plays Billy Maximoff. Rupp described the series as the second season of WandaVision. Agatha All Along premiered in September 2024.

==== VisionQuest ====
By October 2022, a second spin-off series centered on Bettany's Vision was in development, titled Vision Quest, with Bettany starring and Schaeffer set as head writer. Schaeffer was no longer developing Vision Quest by May 2024, due to her focus on Agatha All Along, and Marvel Studios hired Terry Matalas to redevelop the series and serve as its showrunner; Bettany was confirmed to still be reprising his role. Describing the relationship to the other two series, Matalas said VisionQuest was more of a sequel to WandaVision, while touching on some elements from Agatha All Along. Bettany stars alongside James Spader, Ruaridh Mollica, Todd Stashwick, T'Nia Miller, Lauren Morais, Orla Brady, Diane Morgan, Polly Frame, Henry Lewis, Jonathan Sayer, Emily Hampshire, and James D'Arcy, many of whom portray the human forms of various AIs and robots in the MCU. Mollica plays Tommy Maximoff. Locke also reprises his role from Agatha All Along. VisionQuest premiered in October 2026.
