= Jett Klyne =

Canadian actor

- Born: June 15, 2009 (age 17); Penticton, British Columbia, Canada
- Occupation: Actor
- Years active: 2015–present
- Known for: WandaVision; Doctor Strange in the Multiverse of Madness

Jett Klyne is a Canadian actor, best known for his supporting role as Tommy Maximoff in WandaVision and Doctor Strange in the Multiverse of Madness.

== Biography ==
A native of Penticton, British Columbia, he began his career in infancy as the Gerber Baby in a television commercial.

In 2016, he appeared in the horror film The Boy.

In 2018, he appeared in the science fiction film The Humanity Bureau as the childhood version of Nicolas Cage's character; his mother, actress Destee Klyne, also had a supporting role in the film, and his father, Paul Klyne, was involved in the production as Hugh Dillon's stunt double.

In 2023, he starred in the drama film The Boy in the Woods.
