= Apollo 18 (film) =

2011 film by Gonzalo López-Gallego

- Theatrical release poster
- Directed by: Gonzalo López-Gallego
- Written by: Brian Miller
- Produced by: Timur Bekmambetov; Michele Wolkoff
- Starring: Warren Christie; Lloyd Owen; Ryan Robbins
- Cinematography: José David Montero
- Edited by: Patrick Lussier
- Production company: Bazelevs
- Distributed by: Dimension Films (United States); Alliance Films (Canada)
- Release date: September 2, 2011
- Running time: 86 minutes
- Countries: United States; Canada
- Language: English
- Budget: $5 million
- Box office: $26.2 million

Apollo 18 is a 2011 found footage science fiction horror film written by Brian Miller, directed by Gonzalo López-Gallego, and co-produced by Timur Bekmambetov and Michele Wolkoff. An American-Canadian co-production, its premise is that the cancelled Apollo 18 mission actually landed on the Moon in December 1974, but never returned.

Apollo 18 is López-Gallego's first English-language film. After various release date changes, it was released in the United States, United Kingdom, and Canada on September 2, 2011. The film received mostly negative reviews, with most critics comparing it negatively to Paranormal Activity, The Blair Witch Project and Alien.

== Plot ==
Two years after the Apollo 17 mission, the crew of the cancelled Apollo 18 mission—Commander Nathan Walker, Lieutenant Colonel John Grey, and Captain Ben Anderson—learn that it will proceed as a top-secret Department of Defense (DoD) mission to place an early warning detector on the Moon for ICBM attacks from the USSR.

Grey remains aboard Apollo command module Freedom, while Walker and Anderson land in Apollo Lunar Module Liberty to install the detector. Anderson collects rock samples before they return to Liberty. The samples cause minor disturbances, which Houston attributes to interference from the detector. The following day, Anderson discovers footprints leading to an abandoned but functioning Soviet LK lander. Nearby, they find a crater containing a dead cosmonaut, but Houston dismisses Walker's questions. That night, Walker is awakened by strange noises and an object striking the lander.

After completing their mission, Walker and Anderson prepare to leave, but Liberty's launch is aborted when the spacecraft begins shaking violently. They discover damaged foil nearby, along with non-human tracks and damaged equipment. Walker is horrified when a spider-like creature enters his spacesuit, but it disappears before Anderson finds him unconscious near Liberty; Walker later denies the incident. Anderson subsequently removes a Moon rock embedded in Walker. Walker smashes the rock, contaminating the spacecraft. An unknown source interferes with their communications, preventing contact with Houston or Grey.

Anderson theorises that the detector was intended to monitor the aliens and is responsible for the interference. They attempt to deactivate it, only to find that it has been destroyed. Walker becomes increasingly contentious and paranoid, while they discover that the aliens are camouflaged as Moon rocks. Attempting to destroy cameras inside Liberty, Walker damages other controls and causes the spacecraft to depressurise. While travelling to the Soviet LK lander for oxygen, Walker deliberately crashes the rover, believing that returning to Earth would spread the infection.

Anderson awakens to find Walker being dragged into a crater by the aliens. Unable to rescue him, Anderson escapes to the Soviet LK and uses its radio to contact USSR Mission Control, who connect him to the DoD. The Deputy Secretary reveals that the DoD is aware of the situation but will not allow Anderson to return to Earth, believing incorrectly that he is infected. Grey contacts Anderson, and they arrange for him to return to Freedom. As Anderson prepares to launch, Walker suddenly appears and demands entry, but the aliens swarm and kill him. Anderson launches, only for the DoD to order Grey to abort the rescue, threatening to prevent his own return if he refuses.

The LK reaches orbit, where the aliens attack and infect Anderson during free fall. Unable to control the spacecraft, Anderson collides with Freedom. The U.S. government subsequently claims that the astronauts were killed in separate jet accidents and that their bodies could not be recovered. It also notes that many Moon rocks given to dignitaries from previous Apollo missions are now missing.

== Cast ==
- Warren Christie as Lunar Module Pilot Captain Benjamin "Ben" Anderson
- Lloyd Owen as Commander Nathan "Nate" Walker
- Ryan Robbins as Command Module Pilot Lieutenant Colonel John "Johnny" Grey
- Andrew Airlie as CAPCOM (Thomas Young)
- Michael Kopsa as Deputy Secretary of Defense

== Production ==
Apollo 18 was shot in Vancouver, Canada.

The work has been promoted as a "found footage" film that does not use actors. In an interview with Entertainment Weekly, Dimension Films head Bob Weinstein "balk[ed] at the idea" that the film was a work of fiction:

"We didn't shoot anything; we found it. Found, baby!"

The Science & Entertainment Exchange provided a science consultation to the film's production team. NASA was also "minimally involved with this picture", but declined to go further with the project.

The film concludes with a statement that the Nixon Administration gave away hundreds of Moon rocks to foreign dignitaries around the world, and that many of these Moon rocks have been lost or stolen. This is true; both the Nixon and Ford Administrations gave away 135 Apollo 11 Moon rocks and 135 Apollo 17 goodwill Moon rocks. The Moon Rock Project, a joint effort of over 1,000 graduate students started at the University of Phoenix in 2002, has helped track down, recover, or locate many Moon rocks and found that 160 are unaccounted for, lost, or destroyed.

In 1998, a sting operation called Operation Lunar Eclipse recovered the Honduras Apollo 17 goodwill Moon rock.

The film has been distributed by Dimension Films.

=== Alternate endings and deleted scenes ===
Sixteen deleted scenes and four alternate endings are included in the DVD releases.

Other deleted scenes have also surfaced that were included in some of the trailers.

==== Deleted scenes ====
A single deleted scene details the fate of the Russian cosmonaut. He is killed when an alien breaks his helmet visor.

Other deleted scenes show two alternate versions of the dead cosmonaut. In the first version, Walker and Anderson find the cosmonaut's helmet but no Soviet lander. They then find the cosmonaut's body dragged many meters away. In the second version, the cosmonaut's body is partially buried.

Another alternate scene shows Anderson leaving a picture of his family on the surface as he swears that he will get home. As he does, the rock aliens begin to stalk him. Anderson spots the Soviet lander in the distance and narrowly makes it inside as the aliens chase after him.

In another deleted scene, Grey survives the ordeal and argues with a DoD official back on Earth, who reveals that the astronauts were sent to the Moon to get infected and return to Earth so the United States could use the alien venom as a Bioweapon against the Soviet Union, which is conducting human experiments with the venom.

==== Alternate endings ====
In the first ending, Anderson is in the LK after being attacked by Walker. Anderson is surrounded by the aliens as the LK loses oxygen, and he dies from lack of oxygen. An alien then leaves the shot.

In the second ending, Anderson is talking with DoD in the LK and sees the veins in his arms turning black, showing he is infected. The infection overtakes him, and he begins to smash the control panel in rage before breaking the camera, leaving his fate unknown.

In the third ending, Anderson is in the LK, with the aliens trying to break in. Suddenly, a large alien breaks the window of the LK and kills Anderson with a pincer.

In the fourth and final ending, an infected Anderson is in the LK. An alarm begins to sound as the lander plummets back to the Moon. The LK impacts with the surface of the Moon.

== Release ==
Apollo 18 was released on September 2, 2011, in multiple countries. Originally scheduled for February 5, 2010, the film's release date was moved ten times between 2010 and 2011.

=== Home media ===
The film was released December 27, 2011, on DVD, Blu-ray, and online. Special features include an audio commentary with director López-Gallego and editor Patrick Lussier, deleted and alternate scenes and endings, including footage of how the Russian cosmonaut died and 4 alternate deaths of Ben Anderson.

== Reception ==
Apollo 18 received generally negative reviews from critics upon its release. On Rotten Tomatoes, the film holds an approval rating of 24% based on 75 reviews, with an average rating of 4.2 out of 10. The website's consensus reads: "A boring, suspense-free Paranormal Activity rip-off that feels long even at just 90 minutes." On Metacritic, it has a weighted average score of 24 out of 100, indicating "generally unfavorable reviews". Audience reception was similarly poor, with the film receiving a D grade on CinemaScore, suggesting weak word of mouth.

Critics largely criticized the film's lack of originality, comparing it unfavorably to The Blair Witch Project and Paranormal Activity, but failing to capture the same level of suspense. Entertainment Weekly critic Keith Staskiewicz wrote that "Apollo 18 fails to stay with you because, like the cratered satellite on which it's set, it has no atmosphere." Los Angeles Times film critic Mark Olsen wrote "The film takes a startlingly long time to rev up, and even at less than 90 minutes feels thin and at moments like it is playing for time." Other critics noted the slow pacing and predictable scares, with many reviewers noting that the "found-footage" format, while appropriate for the premise, was not effectively executed. Seth Shostak and Keith Cowing both praised the film for its atmospheric tension and its commitment to a realistic 1970s NASA aesthetic.

=== Box office ===
At the end of its run in 2011, Apollo 18 had earned $17,687,709 domestically, plus $8,548,444 overseas for a worldwide gross of $26,236,153 against a $5 million budget, becoming a financial success. In its opening weekend, Apollo 18 screened in 3,328 theaters and opened in number 3, earning $8,704,271, with an average of $2,615 per theater. In its second weekend, the film earned $2,851,349, dropping 62.7%, with an average of $856 per theater, dropping to number 8, but still had a higher total gross at that point over Shark Night 3D, another horror film opening the same weekend as Apollo 18.

== See also ==
- Moonfall, 2022 movie with a similar plot
- Europa Report, 2013 movie also featuring an extraterrestrial encounter on a space mission
- The Case of the Missing Moon Rocks, 2012 nonfiction book about the missing Apollo moon rocks
- Lost Cosmonauts, conspiracy theory involving supposed secret deaths of cosmonauts
- Moon landing conspiracy theories in popular culture
- Moon in fiction
