= Electric Ink =

BBC radio sitcom

- Genre: Comedy
- Running time: 30 minutes
- Country of origin: United Kingdom
- Language: English
- Home station: BBC Radio 4
- Starring: Robert Lindsay (series 1); John Sessions (series 2); Alex Jennings; Elizabeth Berrington (series 1); Polly Frame (series 2); Ben Willbond (series 1); Stephen Wight (series 2)
- Written by: Alistair Beaton; Tom Mitchelson
- Produced by: Sally Avens
- Original release: 2009 – 2010
- No. of series: 2
- No. of episodes: 12
- Audio format: Stereophonic sound
- Opening theme: A-Punk by Vampire Weekend

Electric Ink is a BBC Radio sitcom written by Alistair Beaton and journalist Tom Mitchelson. It stars Robert Lindsay in series one and John Sessions in series two as Maddox Bradley, a 56 year old political journalist at an unnamed broadsheet newspaper that is heading down-market as the circulation numbers drop and budgets are cut. It also maintains an online presence which chases viewers with commercially lucrative "fluff" pieces, blogs, online comments and vodcasts. Alongside the new media aspect, other focuses of the storyline include journalistic ethics and integrity, and the viability of print media.

The first series aired in 2009, with major cast changes for the second series which was broadcast in December 2010. Both series were originally broadcast on BBC Radio 4 with repeats being aired on BBC Radio 4 Extra.

== Cast ==
- Maddox Bradley (Robert Lindsay in series 1, John Sessions in series 2), an old-school print reporter.
- Oliver (Alex Jennings) the Editor-in-Chief desperately trying to keep the newspaper afloat.
- Freddy (Ben Willbond in series 1, Stephen Wight in series 2) the "Head of Online Content" who pretends to be an urban "gangsta" even though he is from the upper classes and attended Oxford University.
- Amelia (Elizabeth Berrington in series 1) The News Editor, Maddox's rival as a journalist, and Oliver's mistress.
- Carol Pilkington (Polly Frame in series 2). Amelia's replacement as News Editor, she formerly worked at the mass-market tabloid newspaper The Sun.
- Tasneem (Zita Sattar in series 1) the Head of Marketing who wants to replace headlines with giveaway offers.
- Masha (Debbie Chazen) the Russian-born website manager who pesters Maddox to respond to online comments. Maddox regards the commenters as "loonies". In series 2 the newspaper website has installed a paywall allowing downloads for 5 pence each. Masha announces that Maddox's "Politics Minute" podcast had 7 downloads for a total of 35 pence.

== Episodes ==
=== Series 1 ===
==== Episode 1 ====
Maddox fights for his interview with radical Muslim cleric Abu Hadad to be published while news editor Amelia argues the article isn't interesting. Freddy tries to get an article published on social stress based on a survey. Oliver orders Maddox to start the Politics Minute vodcast (with 48 seconds of content and an advert), while also rejecting the Abu Hadad article. Masha demands that Maddox respond to user comments on the website blog, much to his chagrin deeming them all "conspiracy theorists". Spotting an opportunity, Maddox uses the users to get his Abu Hadad article published. As Freddy has finished his social stress article, Maddox reveals that the article is rubbish and the survey was funded by pharmaceutical companies who planted the story. Amelia fires Freddy for the medical story, but Maddox comes to the rescue by referring to Oliver and Amelia's ongoing affair, with Amelia deciding that Freddy deserves a second chance. The Abu Hadad article is finally published in a shortened version combined with a guide for ethnic restaurants.

==== Episode 2 ====
Starting the day with a new haircut, Maddox is the butt of jokes as his hairstyle is likened to Donald Trump. The new style is revealed to be Maddox's attempt at self-improvement in preparation for his Politics Minute appearance. A tip is revealed on the wires that Sir Elton John has reportedly assaulted a security guard in Argos branch in Wolverhampton. Tasneem worries as she tells Oliver that the edible mushroom wall chart provided with a previous edition contains a very poisonous mushroom. An investigation is also started into a reported nuclear leak at a power station which is being hushed-up. Oliver calls on Maddox to pay-off a woman who has been poisoned by the mushroom by handing over an envelope with £25,000. At lunch, Amelia tries to persuade Oliver to cover up the nuclear leak story as her mother has shares in the parent company. Maddox returns from paying off the poisoned woman who settles for £5,000 and is upset that the nuclear story has been spiked. He reveals he donated the remaining £20,000 to Greenpeace. The assault story is almost published, except Maddox finds that the Elton John was a tribute act. Maddox's Politics Minute receives a large number of hits due to his Donald Trump-like appearance.

==== Episode 3 ====
Freddy believes he has an exclusive but his source is a website; politicaltart.com which frequently posts ridiculous stories much to Maddox's ire. Freddy believes that the wife of the first finance secretary is shipping gold bullion out of the country in anticipation of a banking crisis. Oliver is again not interested in a story that Maddox has written on healthy food, and instead wants to write an article on the fattest kid in the country (Terry from Tottenham). With a photograph wife of the finance secretary heading into the London Bullion Company, Freddy leaves the office to "chase the story". Amelia and Oliver have a fight, which results in Amelia changing his out of office reply during lunch resulting in some high-ranking officials at the treasury receiving an embarrassing response. Meeting his "source" in an underground parking garage, Freddy is punched during a misunderstanding. The newspaper is beaten by The Sun, who under exclusive contract with Gary from Glasgow, they beat the newspaper and Terry in the fattest kid ranking, while Oliver suggests fattening up Terry to regain the title. The finance secretary announces his resignation after it is revealed that his wife was stashing gold bullion and was prompted by Oliver's "coded-messages" in his out of office replies.

==== Episode 4 ====
The Politics Minute has been further cut to 38 seconds while Oliver has hired model and television star Debbie de Winter as guest columnist. Tasneem and Freddy are excited, while Maddox hates that a reality-television star is given space to write for the newspaper. Debbie hands in her copy and demands that no one rewrite her article, with Oliver eventually talking her around to having Maddox work with Debbie. Amelia discovers a story that several bankers are on the roof of Canary Wharf, drunk and throwing empty champagne bottles off. Excited for a free two-night stay in a 5-star hotel in Inverness, Maddox is disappointed that he is being required to co-write the articles with Debbie. He's even more annoyed when Oliver suggests scrapping the Scotland trip and pulling the review he was due to write from other travel sites. A public school photograph of the bankers at Canary Wharf emerges, showing Freddy in the background who is worried that his reputation as a "street-kid" will be ruined. In revenge for his cancelled trip, Maddox publishes his hotel article based on negative online reviews before discovering that the hotel is owned by a newspaper advertiser.

==== Episode 5 ====
The newspaper misreports that the Prime Minister was opening a new primary school, but in fact he never got into the building due to a "security alert". Amelia attempts to get Maddox to write an article on "turnip crinkle disease" affecting East Anglia, much to his annoyance while Maddox instead is more interested about the security threat and why there would be one in Chichester. Amelia and Oliver have another argument when Oliver tries to get her to view an apartment before signing the contract, however Amelia is happy with the current affair arrangements. Maddox returns from Chichester after finding that the PM is suffering depression, and is receiving help from a television psychiatrist. Oliver and Maddox are invited by the Prime Minister's wife to Downing Street who attempts to get them not to publish the story as she is concerned for his welfare. After they leave, the PM's wife calls her husband to tell him "it didn't work and it has to be plan B". The PM invites the pair to a face-to-face meeting as a delaying tactic the following morning, and instead goes on a talk show to admit his problem.

==== Episode 6 ====
In morning conference, Oliver announces that when each employee returns to their desk, they will find a letter announcing they are fired with employees being able to reapply for their positions. Continuing his piece on a hacker awaiting extradition to the United States, Maddox believes he can "go out with a bang" however Freddy is dubious. Amelia learns that Oliver intervened with the board on her behalf to keep her job safe, much to her dismay as she wishes to be treated the same as everybody else. Amelia decides to end the relationship. Freddy returns from Swindon after doing his own research on the hacker, finding background information about his family and childhood as he pushes Maddox to introduce a personal and entertainment angle. Tasneem and Oliver discuss her marketing ideas including space travel vouchers, recipe cards, and a Westlife CD, which Oliver does not take very well. Freddy is happy that Maddox took his advice seriously while writing the hacker article. During discussion with Oliver, Maddox finds out that the hackers extradition was won but he has a criminal history for cruelty to animals which Freddy failed to uncover. Looking at the prospect of bad press, Oliver is fired by phone call.

=== Series 2 ===
==== Episode 1 ====
Maddox returns after two-weeks off which was originally supposed to be for a dental appointment. Upon being called into Oliver's office, he finds that the newspaper has settled prior to a libel lawsuit for comments made during the Politics Minute, which Oliver announces he is also suspending. Maddox returns to his desk to find replacement news editor Carol waiting at his desk who is annoyed at his extended time away. Masha and Carol discuss the new paywall which has seen Maddox earn 35 pence for his published content. Freddy and Maddox discuss the lawsuit, which Freddy questions due to the low viewing figures on his vodcast. Maddox heads out to meet Keith, the initiator of the lawsuit who takes some prompting to remember who Maddox is. He reveals that someone from a law firm contacted him and offered money to begin the lawsuit. Freddy receives a phone call and finds Maddox has been lying about his dental problems and instead visited a health retreat. Maddox leans on the law firm to return the money before he reports them to the solicitors regulator. Carol is given the job of presenting the Politics Minute, but has it quickly taken away again and given back to Maddox.

==== Episode 2 ====
While throwing out a number of letters and deleting a bunch of emails which don't interest him, Maddox almost deletes an email from a whistle blower on a Midlands hospital. The source reports that the hospital is in poor hygiene and that health and safety is ignored, and encloses a number of photographs. Freddy prompts him that his whistle blower may be uncovered, however Maddox is adamant he won't give up the source. Carol chastises both Maddox and Freddy for their expenses related to recent stories they worked on. Maddox is handed a judgement on revealing his source for the hospital story, after missing a summons hearing after not reading the letter, with failure to give the source meaning that Maddox could go to prison. Looking to Oliver for help with a lawyer, Oliver refuses and tells him to give up the source. After leaving a lunch with Carol and Oliver, Maddox is arrested and taken to prison to share a cell with Dangerous Brian. Maddox gives up the name of the source, and then settles into a depression after release from prison. Freddy analyses footage of the source being arrested, spotting that although she is a "cleaning lady", she is not what she appears. He finds that she is contracted to a private cleaning contractor and placed in the hospital as a plant in an attempt to get the company she works for a cleaning contract. Maddox prepares for early retirement due to his shame, but is cheered by the discovery.

==== Episode 3 ====
Maddox has to listen to details of Freddy's upcoming date with Brazilian Maria, who he discovers on Bebo. Meanwhile, writing an article on palm oil, Maddox targets chocolate manufacturers Cramtons for their use of the product. Meanwhile, Carol wishes to rid the video comments of anyone not deemed stylish or beautiful enough, much to the annoyance of Masha. Oliver rejects Maddox's copy on the palm oil article, preferring to allow the British National Party to advertise in the space instead. Maddox organises a protest, however only five protesters against the advert arrive in the newspaper lobby. Downcast, Maddox enlists Freddy's help to gain more protesters using social media. Meanwhile, Masha brings in a number of awful actors to present the video comments, however Carol complains they aren't good enough; resulting in the original commenter’s being restored. A group is started on Facebook calling for a protest against the newspaper if the advert is run, with Oliver finally deciding to pull the advert to avoid more bad press. Freddy is also delighted as the adverts removal puts him in good favour with politically active Maria. In place of the BNP advert, Oliver publishes a Cramtons advert, which immensely annoys Maddox as he reveals to Freddy that the company is hated around the world; especially in Brazil.

==== Episode 4 ====
Carol and Maddox get into an argument after she asks him to cover a story on an overweight Orangutan eating a Big Mac, which she tries to sell as an animal rights issue. Freddy receives a phone call from a bank worker with a tip-off that a Liberal Democrat MP Julie Compton has withdrawn £50,000, which Maddox suspects is a sign of upcoming corruption. Maddox heads over to a select committee meeting she is due to attend along with Freddy. Princess Arabella, 22nd in line to the thrown, is looking to change her public image and is due to visit the newspaper which excites Masha immensely. On the stakeout, Maddox and Freddy wait in a car park as the MP and observe the MP handing over the bag containing the money to a man who they follow to the Packham Pensioners Club. Talking with Masha, Freddy reveals he knows Princess Arabella from school and is willing to introduce her and Masha. Carol is more interested however in the rumours that the princess has been sleeping with Wayne Rooney and wants to broach the question on camera. Maddox meets with the MP and confronts her with what he knows, who eventually reveals that she is paying out of her own pocket for the pensioners lunch club due to funding cuts. Maddox still plans to run the story as her actions are going against government austerity policy which causes Julie to resign. The princess cancels her visit, leaving Carol irate and Freddy with the Orangutan story which needs to be rewritten as it has died of too many burgers.

==== Episode 5 ====
Maddox is reading a book from author Miles Deanbrook who he plans to do an interview with. Freddy constantly harangues him for reading what he calls pretentious drivel, but Maddox manages to talk him round to reading it in exchange for copy corrections for the next week. In private, Oliver reveals that he has to make cuts, and wants Carol to get everyone to take a 25% pay cut. Masha is unhappy at the pay-cut news, and even more annoyed that Carol is not taking a cut due to her being a manager. After reading the book, Freddy notices the book appears to be written to a formula and enlists Masha in finding the oddity of the book. At a meal with Deanbrook, Maddox is interrupted by Freddy who begins to question Miles that his adjectives are all in alphabetical order, and that characters appear at regular intervals. Freddy confronts Miles that he knows he has been using a piece of software to write the book for him. Maddox writes up the piece which Oliver praises, however spikes the piece after Deanbrook is admitted to a psychiatric hospital after a breakdown, with the piece being replaced by 2,000 words on sex addiction. Masha has been hacking into the payroll computers and finds Oliver's bonus has gone up by £50,000 from the previous year before using Maddox to blackmail Oliver to run the piece on Deanbrook and review the pay cuts.

==== Episode 6 ====
Oliver has to take a few days away from the office, and Maddox is suspicious of his excuse. Masha reveals that he is also learning Russian. Snooping on the future events calendar, Freddy and Maddox find that unscrupulous Russian oligarch Andrei Zinoviev is docked on the Isle of Wight and visiting for the same period Oliver is away. Carol puts Freddy onto a story on actress Isabella Hudson who is donating a kidney, but Carol wants dirt. Arriving at Oliver's office, Maddox confronts him on his meeting at which Oliver admits the newspaper is likely to be sold to the billionaire. Maddox suggests running a piece he had previously spiked on the Russian, and that a co-operative business model would be better than being taken over by the billionaire, but Oliver quickly rejects the likeliness of the idea. Looking at a long lens photograph of Isabella taken on a private beach, Maddox spots that there is no scar from the operation. Planning on extinction of species to fuel a vast mark-up, Oliver is uncomfortable talking to Andrei as he announces that the contracts are due to be signed tomorrow. Maddox sneaks on to the yacht and is caught by Zinoviev's guards, but managed to retrieve a document from the office which reveals that Oliver is due to be fired by the new owner despite promises to the contrary. Further digging by Freddy finds that Isabella lied about the donation for publicity, with her agents buying a kidney for the recipient to prevent the bad press. Zinoviev pulls his bid after Oliver threatens to run the previous piece, leaving the newspaper in financial trouble. Oliver announces that the newspaper is going online-only in a cash-saving effort.
