= Lauren Morais =

Welsh actress

- Morais at Marvel's VisionQuest Premiere in London in 2026
- Born: Lauren Albertina Morais; 2001 or 2002 (age 24–25); Cardiff
- Education: Royal Welsh College of Music & Drama
- Occupation: Actor
- Years active: 2021–present

Lauren Albertina Morais (born 2001/2002) is a Welsh actress. She is best known for portraying Becca Lewis Jones in Mudtown and Lisa Molinari in VisionQuest.

== Early life ==
Morais is from Llanrumney in Cardiff, Wales. Morais attended Ysgol Gyfun Gymraeg Bro Edern. She graduated from the Royal Welsh College of Music and Drama in 2023.

== Career ==
Her first acting role was in Y Gyfrinach (The Secret) for S4C and in 2021 worked on Sian of Arc by Mari Izzard, with the National Youth Theatre of Wales. She had an early role in Welsh television drama Tree on a Hill.

In 2024, she played Lucy Popkin in Wales-set mystery drama The Red King. The following year, she could be seen in crime drama adaptation The Crow Girl on Paramount+.

She had a leading role alongside Erin Richards, playing her magistrate mother, in both the Welsh and English language versions of Mudtown (Ar y Ffin).

In November 2025, she was cast as Lisa Molinari in the Marvel Cinematic Universe television series VisionQuest.

== Filmography ==
=== Television ===
Year	Title	Role	Notes
2023	Tree on a Hill	Bronny	2 episodes
2024	The Red King	Lucy Popkin	5 episodes
2025	The Crow Girl	Charlie	3 episodes
2025	Mudtown	Becca Lewis Jones	6 episodes
2026	VisionQuest	Lisa Molinari	8 episodes
