= Erin Richards =

Welsh actress and director (born 1983)

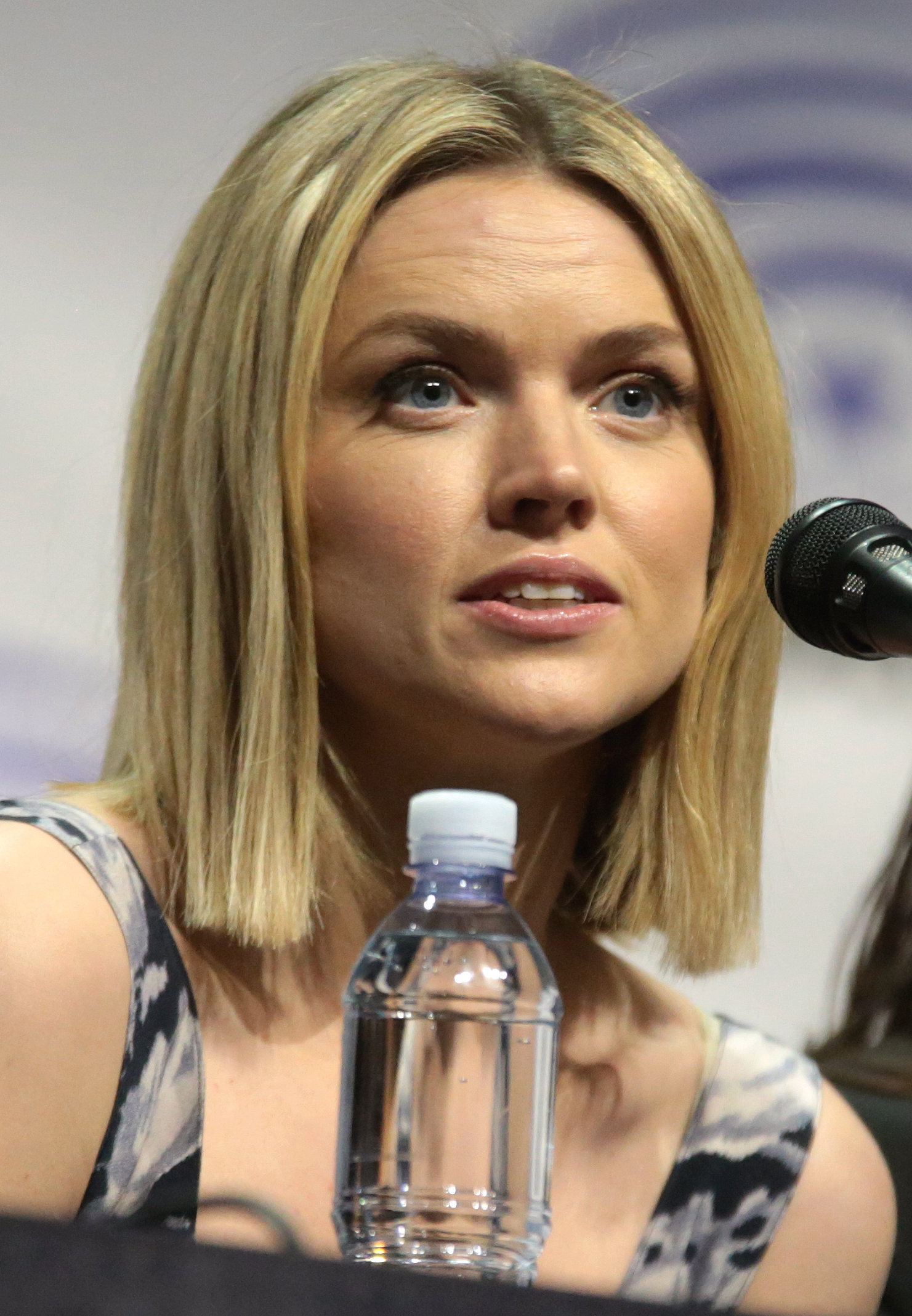
- Richards at the 2017 WonderCon to promote Gotham
- Born: 12 December 1983 (age 42); Penarth, Vale of Glamorgan, Wales
- Education: Royal Welsh College of Music & Drama
- Occupations: Actress, director, screenwriter
- Years active: 2005–present
- Children: 1

Erin Richards (born 12 December 1983) is a Welsh actress, director and writer, best known for playing Molly Hughes in the television series Breaking In and Barbara Kean in the television series Gotham.

== Life and career ==
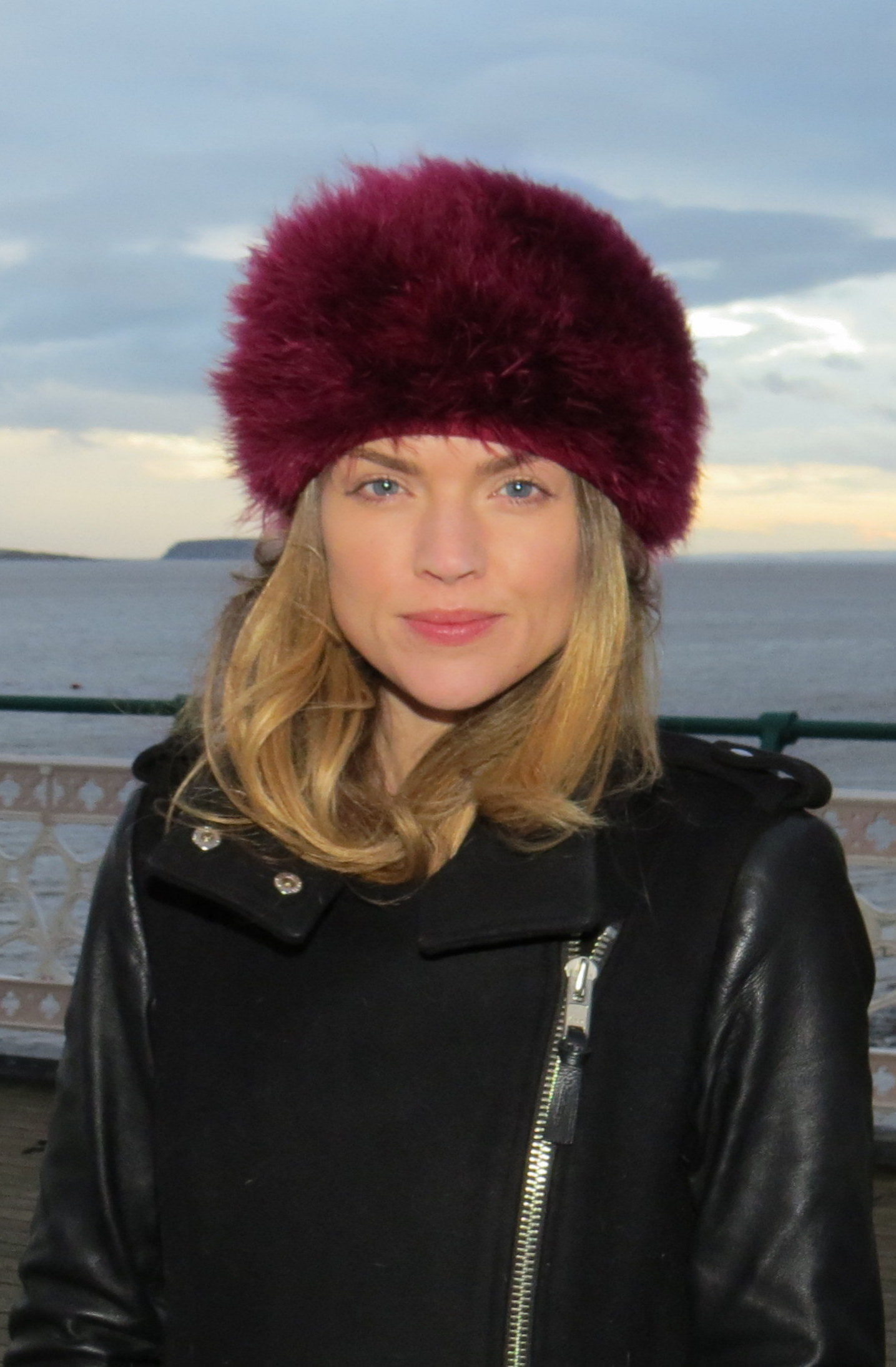
Richards in 2016

Richards was born on 12 December 1983, in Penarth, Wales. She trained at the Royal Welsh College of Music and Drama. She presented the Welsh language teen magazine show Mosgito for S4C and appeared in short films before landing significant roles in BBC TV programmes Crash and Being Human.

In 2012, she was cast in the FOX comedy Breaking In as an executive assistant with an exaggerated English accent. She became a Breaking In regular in January 2012.

She co-starred in the role of Sharon in Gonzalo López-Gallego's horror film Open Grave, alongside Sharlto Copley.

From 2014 to 2019, she played Barbara Kean in the FOX Television series Gotham. She directed the fifth season episode "The Trial of Jim Gordon", which premiered on 7 March 2019.

A 2025 interview about the series Mudtown revealed Richards had a two year old son and was expecting her second child.

== Filmography ==
=== Film ===
Year	Title	Role	Notes
2005	Expiry Date	Luce	
2008	Abraham's Point	Milly	
2009	17	Gemma	Short film
2010	Balance	Becki	Short film
2012	Will Sampson (...and the Self-Perpetuating Cycle of Unintended Abstinence)	Sofia	Short film
2013	Open Grave	Sharon	
2014	The Quiet Ones	Kristina 'Krissi' Dalton	
2017	That Good Night	Cassie	
2018	Hot Girl	Kara Quinn	Short film, her directorial debut
2019	The Christmas Kid	Patricia	
2022	Save the Cinema	Susan	
2022	Grey Elephant	Alexa	
2023	Starve Acre	Harrie	

=== Television ===
Year	Title	Role	Notes
2010	Crash	Cheryl	"2.3"
2011	Being Human	Nancy Reid	"Daddy Ghoul", "Though the Heavens Fall", "The Wolf-Shaped Bullet"
2012	Breaking In	Molly Hughes	Season 2 (Main cast)
2012	Merlin	Eira	"The Diamond of the Day: Parts 1 & 2"
2013	Crossing Lines	Nicole	"The Terminator"
2013	Misfits	Sarah	"5.7"
2014–2019	Gotham	Barbara Kean	Main cast: 75 episodes
2020	The Brides	Renée Pélagie	Main cast
2022–2023	The Crown	Kelly Fisher	Season 5, episode 10 "Decommissioned"; Season 6, episode 1 "Persona Non Grata"
2024	The Way	Willis	1 episode
2024	Ar y Ffin/Mudtown	Claire Lewis Jones	Main cast
2026	I Will Find You	Cheryl Dreason	Main role

=== Director ===
Year	Title	Note(s)
2018	Hot Girl	Short
2019	Gotham	Episode: "The Trial of Jim Gordon"
2020	God Friended Me	Episode: "The Atheist Papers"
