= Open Grave =

2013 film by Gonzalo López-Gallego

- Theatrical release poster
- Directed by: Gonzalo López-Gallego
- Written by: Chris Borey; Eddie Borey
- Produced by: Michael Wunderman
- Starring: Sharlto Copley; Thomas Kretschmann; Josie Ho; Joseph Morgan; Erin Richards; Max Wrottesley
- Cinematography: José David Montero
- Edited by: Gonzalo López-Gallego
- Music by: Juan Navazo
- Production companies: Atlas Independent; 852 Films; Speranza13 Media
- Distributed by: Tribeca Films
- Release dates: August 14, 2013 (Italy); January 3, 2014 (United States)
- Running time: 102 minutes
- Country: United States
- Language: English
- Box office: $489,812

Open Grave is a 2013 American post-apocalyptic horror film directed by Gonzalo López-Gallego, starring Sharlto Copley and Thomas Kretschmann, Joseph Morgan, Erin Richards, Josie Ho, and Max Wrottesley in supporting roles. Josie Ho plays the character of a mute. All the characters, excluding the mute, suffer from amnesia and cannot remember anything from their lives. The story follows them trying to figure out their identities and their past while evading zombie-like humans affected by a rage virus and also their struggle to escape the forest they are stuck in. The film received generally negative reviews from critics.

== Plot ==
A man wakes up in a large pit full of dead bodies and does not remember how he got there. A mute woman helps him escape, and he follows her to a house with four other occupants—a German man and three Americans. Like him, the others do not remember who they are; only the mute woman, who does not understand English, seems to know about them, although they slowly begin to remember certain attributes, such as an ability with guns or certain languages.

They find ID cards for four of them: the German is Lukas, and the three Americans are Sharon, Nathan and Michael. No ID is found for the man, who is given the name John Doe, or the mute woman. A nearby calendar hints that something is going to happen on the 18th — two days hence — but there are no notes to indicate what. Exploring the immediate surroundings of the house, they discover corpses chained to trees.

John, Sharon, Nathan and Lukas continue to explore the next morning. They find two cars and a picture of the five of them without John. Lukas takes this as a sign that John is not a real member of their group, though John suggests he took the picture himself. Later, John and Sharon stumble across a child hiding in a locked shelter. The child tells John his real name — Jonah — but is clearly terrified of him.

Meanwhile, Michael hears screams in the distance and follows them until he finds a badly injured man trapped in barbed wire. When Michael tries to help, the man kills him. Jonah kills the murderer as the mute woman tearfully says goodbye to Michael, with whom she had a relationship.

Jonah suffers numerous violent flashbacks. He and Sharon are chased by people with axes but are saved when their car drives past two corpses hanging from the trees — a point past which their pursuers won't go. Nathan finds a woman and her child chained in a cabin and narrowly escapes when they and a group of people in a zombie-like state attack him.

An increasingly ill Lukas stumbles across a video camera that contains clips of Jonah conducting medical experiments on him and others. In the clips, Jonah explains that the vaccine prevents the spread of an infection but causes symptoms such as temporary amnesia and a death-like state. Lukas knocks Jonah out and throws him back in the body pit, then attacks the mute woman and Sharon, who drives him off with a shotgun. The mute woman helps Jonah escape again, and while trying to drive as far away as he can, Jonah encounters the child from earlier and three others who are trying to escape. They abandon their car for another. They are adamant that his name is Jonah and he is a dangerous man, before driving away. Jonah explores the abandoned car, discovering a medical kit, documents addressed to him, and a photo of him and Sharon confirming they knew each other previously.

Jonah remembers that he is Dr Jonah Cooke and that he was trying to cure a plague that turns people into despondent, violent ghouls. Sharon, Lukas and the others were his medical team. The medical kit from the abandoned car contains vaccines that Cooke had tried to send to a military base but never arrived. A few days earlier, Jonah had been attacked by an infected person while throwing a corpse into the pit. Now infected himself, Jonah administered the vaccine, fell into the deathlike state before awaking. The others also took the vaccine as a precaution.

Lukas, still infected, attacks Jonah but dies before Jonah can administer a dose of the vaccine from the medical kit. At dawn, as Jonah races on foot back to the house, Nathan and Sharon fully regain their memories. A large group of infected people attack, and in desperation Sharon writes a letter to Jonah that explains what has happened and what the solution is. She reveals that the mute woman is the key to survival, as she is immune to the virus that has wiped out most of the world's population.

When helicopters arrive and kill the infected surrounding the house, Nathan remembers that a military rescue team was due to come on the 18th. Nathan goes outside to greet the rescuers, but is killed as Sharon, the mute woman and Jonah watch helplessly. The rescue team is now a search-and-destroy mission. Sharon and Jonah flee, but she is mortally wounded by an infected woman. Before dying, she gives Jonah the letter but he doesn't read it.

Realizing his best chance for survival is for the soldiers to think he is dead, Jonah takes the vaccine and goes back into the pit. When he revives, the mute woman again helps him from the pit. Not remembering the letter is from Sharon or important, Jonah leaves it behind as he and the mute woman leave together.

== Cast ==
- Sharlto Copley as John Doe/Jonah Cooke, M.D.
- Josie Ho as the mute
- Thomas Kretschmann as Lukas
- Joseph Morgan as Nathan
- Erin Richards as Sharon, M.D.
- Max Wrottesley as Michael

== Development ==
The film is directed by Gonzalo López-Gallego.

Filming occurred in May 2012 in Hungary. Copley was confirmed to star in the film on May 2, 2012.

Josie Ho, Thomas Kretschmann, Joseph Morgan, Erin Richards, and Max Wrottesley were confirmed to join the cast on May 3, 2012. Filming also began on that day.

== Reception ==
On Rotten Tomatoes the film has an approval rating of 19% based on reviews from 16 critics. On Metacritic it has a score of 33% based on reviews from 5 critics, indicating "generally unfavorable reviews".

Frank Scheck of The Hollywood Reporter wrote: "The screenplay by Eddie and Chris Borey fails to live up to the juiciness of the original premise, lacking meaningful character development and teasing out its unveiling of its mysterious plot elements in dull, plodding fashion."
