= A Planet for the President =

Book by Alistair Beaton

- Author: Alistair Beaton
- Language: English
- Genre: Political, Satire, Dystopian novel
- Publisher: Weidenfeld & Nicolson
- Publication date: 30 September 2004
- Publication place: United States
- Media type: Print (Hardback & Paperback)
- Pages: 256
- ISBN: 0-297-84776-7 (hardback edition)
- OCLC: 56658858

A Planet for the President (2004) is a novel by Alistair Beaton. Set in the not-too-distant future, it satirically explores what action the President of the United States might take if he finally realized that global climate change is rendering Earth increasingly uninhabitable. Eventually persuaded by his aides to "think the unthinkable", the President—Fletcher J. Fletcher— green-lights drastic measures to halt environmental destruction and secure his legacy as the savior of the Earth. A political satire, A Planet for the President is a thinly disguised commentary on the administration of George W. Bush.

The book was published by Orion Books.

== Plot summary ==
=== The environmental situation ===
Facing unprecedented natural disasters, an increasing percentage of the US population demands leadership. Fletcher, however, ignores ecological concerns, dismissing warnings from scientists and environmental groups as the rantings of "eco-nuts". For example, when wildfires in California kill 38 Hollywood celebrities at a private party in Malibu and fell the 2,200-year-old General Sherman Tree in Sequoia National Park, destroying a symbol of American strength, Fletcher rationalises his lack of environmental policy by baselessly blaming arson. He ignores the human-exacerbated drought that enabled the fire to spread.

The terrifying consequences of environmental destruction have become a day-to-day reality to people all over the world. The United Kingdom, for example, America's closest ally, suffers "the loss of much of East Anglia" due to flooding, and Prime Minister James Halstead, as a gesture of friendship, sends Fletcher "the last cod from the North Sea for at least ten years", a specimen which, he adds, could just as well be "the last North Sea cod ever". In Nepal, inexperienced engineers trying to drain a glacial lake cause the surrounding moraine to burst, which results in a valley being flooded and in 62,000 Nepalese losing their lives. And in the United States, New Orleans is flooded and destroyed and 23,142 people are killed when Hurricane Wendy, a Category 5 hurricane, hits the city. The bald eagle, a symbol of America, is on the verge of extinction.

In these troubled times, many state leaders turn to the American President for support, a fact which on occasion makes Fletcher J. Fletcher reflect on the state of the union and the globe.

=== Domestic politics ===
In theory, the United States is still a democracy. In practice, Fletcher is heading a War Cabinet. The FBI, the CIA and the Pentagon have assumed most of the tasks of the former government. To divert attention from presidential lapses, Fletcher's inner circle becomes increasingly ruthless. For instance, the President has a televised meeting with a couple named Chuck and Geraldine. A few days later, Chuck runs amok, killing his family. To remove the President's association with a murderer from the headlines, his media chief and the Defense Secretary launch an airstrike against Haiti. The bombing kills a guerrilla, eleven fishermen, and twenty-two villagers, which Fletcher publicly praises as a victory against terrorism.

Later, the President's inner circle launches a chemical attack on the Supreme Court, killing all nine Justices.

Citizens' First Amendment rights are increasingly ignored. For example, freedom of the press is practically non-existent; many political opponents are forced underground after the media is strictly controlled. Covert listening devices have been widely installed so that no one can be sure that their conversation is not being listened to, recorded, transcribed, and archived for future use.

The U.S. defense budget is the largest in history, while there is no discernible social safety net any longer. The Administration encourages citizens to live by traditional American values. Foreign food imports as well as vegetarianism are frowned upon; the number of females in leading positions has been reduced to a few token women; teen abstinence rallies are regularly organised; homosexuality is generally considered unnatural. A strong Christian element pervades the decision-making process in the White House.

The product of these developments is a thoroughly hypocritical society. For example, Special Assistant Vince Lennox frequently eats cheeseburgers with the President, hiding his vegetarianism. Meanwhile, celebrities publicly support moral campaigns while privately indulging in promiscuity. The President himself, whose son comes out during a live television broadcast, more and more often locks himself in his private study adjacent to the Oval Office to "be alone with his God", a phrase which is very soon recognized by everyone on the presidential staff as a euphemism for drinking bourbon.

=== The solution: MPR and Operation Deliverance ===
More and more members of the Fletcher Administration realize that something has to be done about the global environmental crisis. Influenced by a confidential study from a government-sponsored think tank, they adopt a radical solution. Instead of promoting a simple lifestyle and drastically reducing toxic emissions, they warm to the idea of MPR—Mass Population Reduction: Fewer people on the planet will also result in less pollution, and that, in the long run, will be the only way to save humanity. The plan is to trigger a pandemic which, within a few hours, will kill six billion people—96 percent of the world's population, i.e. everyone except the population of the United States. The means for doing so is a newly developed lethal virus which will immediately kill all humans unless they have been vaccinated against it. A new governmental campaign is to make U.S. citizens believe that America's enemies are plotting to attack the United States with biological weapons, and thus scare them so much that they have themselves inoculated. (The chemical attack on the Supreme Court is a tactic to shock the initially reluctant population into getting inoculated.) After "Operation Deliverance" has been carried out, Americans are to colonise the globe. This plan, America's rulers believe, has also been sanctioned by God.

Fletcher publicly announces a global environmental survey, gaining overflight rights for US military aircraft from all countries except North Korea. Secretly, these aircraft are equipped to spread the highly contagious virus worldwide.

At the same time mass production of the new vaccine sets in, and soon afterwards the new vaccination programme for all U.S. citizens is started. Just in time before being inoculated himself, Fletcher J. Fletcher realizes that he is allergic to eggs and thus, for medical reasons, cannot be given the vaccine. It turns out that German technology can solve the problem, as there is one company in Cologne which can produce the vaccine without the help of eggs. So, in due course, the President of the United States also gets his shot.

Immediately after Operation Deliverance has finally been launched, reports of U.S. citizens dying by the hundreds—although they have been inoculated against the virus—reach the White House. Scientists discover too late that the hastily mass-produced vaccine is ineffective because the administration eliminated vital production regulations to aid business. ("The free market made America and the free market destroyed America.")

In the end, Fletcher J. Fletcher is the only human survivor, as his vaccine was the only one produced outside the United States. He continues living in the White House for several years until his death.

== Reception ==
Tom Boncza-Tomaszewski reviewed the book in The Independent, describing it as a "depressingly plausible satire" with characters who were "all pretty vile — but pleasingly so". The book is analysed in a chapter of the 2015 book American Political Fictions: War on Errorism in Contemporary American Literature, Culture, and Politics.
