= Alistair Beaton =

British writer

- Born: 1947 (age 78–79); Glasgow, Scotland, United Kingdom
- Notable work: A Planet for the President

Alistair Beaton (born 1947) is a playwright and satirist, journalist, radio presenter, novelist, and television writer. At one point in his career he was also a speechwriter for Gordon Brown.

Born in Glasgow, Scotland, Beaton was educated at the universities of Edinburgh, Moscow, and Bochum and graduated from the University of Edinburgh with First-Class Honours in Russian and German. He lives in London.

== Works ==
=== Non-fiction ===
- The Thatcher Papers (1980)
- The Little Book of Complete Bollocks (1999)
- The Little Book of New Labour Bollocks (2000)
- The Little Book of Management Bollocks (2001)
- The Little Book of Brexit Bollocks (2019)

=== Fiction ===
- Don Juan on the Rocks (novel, 1994)
- Drop the Dead Donkey 2000 (novel, 1994) (co-authored with Andy Hamilton, after the British sitcom Drop the Dead Donkey)
- A Planet for the President (novel, 2004)

=== Stage plays ===
- The Ratepayers' Iolanthe (co-written with Ned Sherrin) South Bank and Phoenix Theatre West End (1984)
- The Metropolitan Mikado (co-written with Ned Sherrin) South Bank (1985)
- King the Musical (lyrics, co-written with Maya Angelou) Piccadilly Theatre West End (1985)
- Feelgood (a satire on New Labour spin doctors) Hampstead Theatre and Garrick Theatre West End (2001)
- Follow My Leader (a musical about the Iraq War, music by Richard Blackford) Birmingham Repertory Theatre and Hampstead Theatre (2004)
- King of Hearts (a satire on the monarchy) Hampstead Theatre (2007)
- Caledonia (a musical satire about the Royal Bank of Scotland and the 17th century Darien Scheme) King's Theatre Edinburgh International Festival (2010)
- Fracked: Or Please Don't Use The F Word (a climate change play) Chichester Festival Theatre and National Tour (2016/2017)
- The Accidental Leader Arts Theatre West End (2016)
- Alone in Berlin Royal & Derngate and York Theatre Royal (2020)
- Kardinalfehler / Cardinal Error, a satirical comedy about the Catholic Church, currently in rep (2023) at Theater Trier, Germany. Nation-wide tour of Germany scheduled for 2025

=== Translations and adaptations ===
- Nikolai Gogol's The Government Inspector (translated from the Russian) produced at the Chichester Festival Theatre, starring Alistair McGowan
- Gogol's The Nose (based on the Gogol short story of the same name)
- La Vie parisienne (operetta by Jacques Offenbach, translated from French)
- Die Fledermaus (from the German)
- The Arsonists (a 2007 version of the 1953 play Biedermann und die Brandstifter by Max Frisch)
- The Caucasian Chalk Circle (a 2010 translation of the play of the same name by Bertolt Brecht)
- The Resistible Rise of Arturo Ui (a 2013 version of the Bertolt Brecht play, Chichester Festival Theatre and Duchess Theatre, West End)

=== Television ===
- Not The Nine O'Clock News (1979–1982)
- It'll All Be Over in Half an Hour (1983)
- Spitting Image (1984–1996)
- Incident on the Line (from Tickets for the Titanic, 1987)
- The Way, the Truth, the Video (from Tickets for the Titanic, 1987)
- Dunrulin (1990)
- Downwardly Mobile (1994)
- At Fifty Men Kiss Differently (screenplay, 1998; based on a novel by Dorit Zinn)
- A Very Social Secretary (2005)
- The Trial of Tony Blair (2007)

=== Radio ===
- Fourth Column, a BBC Radio 4 show for writers and journalists
- Electric Ink, BBC Radio 4 starring Robert Lindsay (2009/2010)
- The Beaton Generation

=== Miscellaneous ===
- Consultant to Columbia TriStar Pictures 1991-1995
- Additional lyrics for the song "Small Titles And Orders" in the Chichester Festival Theatre's production of The Gondoliers in the summer of 2003.
- Consultant to stage musical Himmel und Kölle, Volksbühne, Cologne 2020/2021
