= Vision (2015 comic book) =

Comic book series by Marvel Comics

Publication information
- Publisher: Marvel Comics
- Schedule: Monthly
- Format: Limited series
- Genre: Science fiction; Superhero
- Publication date: November 2015 – October 2016
- No. of issues: 12
- Main character(s): Vision; Viv Vision

Creative team
- Written by: Tom King
- Artist(s): Gabriel Hernandez Walta; Michael Walsh (issue #7)

Vision (stylized as The Vision) is an American comic book published by Marvel Comics, based on the character of the same name. The 12-issue limited series–written by Tom King, and illustrated by Gabriel Hernandez Walta and Michael Walsh–began publication on November 4, 2015, and concluded on October 26, 2016.

== Publication history ==
Vision began publication on November 4, 2015, and concluded on October 26, 2016.

=== Issues ===
Issue	Title	Publication date	Ref.
#1	"Visions of the Future"	November 4, 2015	
#2	"Everything Slips Through Their Fingers"	December 2, 2015	
#3	"In and Out"	January 6, 2016	
#4	"Balls in the Air"	February 3, 2016	
#5	"The Villainy You Teach Me"	March 9, 2016	
#6	"P vs. NP"	April 6, 2016	
#7	"I Too Shall be Saved by Love"	May 11, 2016	
#8	"Victorious"	June 8, 2016	
#9	"They Will Die in the Flames"	July 13, 2016	
#10	"All Will Return to Normal"	August 10, 2016	
#11	"You and I Were Born For Better Things"	September 21, 2016	
#12	"Spring"	October 26, 2016	

== In other media ==
Vision served as an inspiration for the Disney+ miniseries WandaVision (2021), and VisionQuest (2026).
