= VisionQuest =

2026 Marvel Studios television miniseries

- Genre: Adventure; Drama; Mystery; Science fiction; Superhero; Surreal comedy
- Created by: Terry Matalas
- Based on: Marvel Comics
- Showrunner: Terry Matalas
- Starring: Paul Bettany; James Spader; Ruaridh Mollica; Todd Stashwick; Lauren Morais; Orla Brady; Diane Morgan; Polly Frame; Henry Lewis; Jonathan Sayer; Emily Hampshire; James D'Arcy; Ben Crompton; T'Nia Miller; Art Malik; Mary McDonnell; Joe Locke
- Music by: Mick Giacchino
- Country of origin: United States
- Original language: English
- No. of seasons: 1
- No. of episodes: 8

Production
- Executive producers: Kevin Feige; Louis D'Esposito; Brad Winderbaum; Paul Bettany; Mary Livanos; Terry Matalas; Jac Schaeffer; Christopher J. Byrne
- Producer: Roopesh Parekh
- Production location: London
- Cinematography: Christopher Ross; Neville Kidd; Ben Smithard
- Editors: Drew Nichols; Amelia Allwarden; Jamie Gross; Christopher Gay; McKenna Cook
- Running time: 48–72 minutes
- Production company: Marvel Television

Original release
- Network: Disney+
- Release: October 13 – November 10, 2026

Related
- WandaVision; Agatha All Along; Marvel Cinematic Universe television series

VisionQuest is an American television miniseries created by Terry Matalas for the streaming service Disney+, based on Marvel Comics featuring the character Vision. A spin-off from and sequel to the miniseries WandaVision (2021), it is the 18th television series in the Marvel Cinematic Universe (MCU) from Marvel Studios and is produced under its Marvel Television label. The series shares continuity with the films of the MCU. It follows the synthezoid Vision as he attempts to understand who he is by communicating with AI personas embedded in his programming, and goes on the run with a mysterious teenager who may be his reincarnated son. Matalas serves as showrunner and a director.

Paul Bettany reprises his role as Vision from previous MCU media, starring alongside James Spader, Ruaridh Mollica, Todd Stashwick, Lauren Morais, Orla Brady, Diane Morgan, Polly Frame, Henry Lewis, Jonathan Sayer, Emily Hampshire, James D'Arcy, Ben Crompton, T'Nia Miller, Art Malik, Mary McDonnell, and Joe Locke. Development of a Vision series began by October 2022, with WandaVision's Jac Schaeffer as head writer. She was no longer involved by May 2024, when Matalas was redeveloping the series and Bettany was confirmed to be starring. It was described as the final installment in a trilogy that began with WandaVision and continued with Agatha All Along (2024). Casting for the AI personas included some returning MCU characters and actors. Filming began by March 2025 and wrapped in July, taking place at Pinewood Studios in London with Christopher J. Byrne, Gandja Monteiro, Vincenzo Natali, and Matalas directing episodes.

VisionQuest premiered with its first two episodes on Disney+ on October 13, 2026, and ran for eight episodes, concluding on November 10. It is part of Phase Six of the MCU.

== Premise ==
After being resurrected in WandaVision (2021), the synthezoid Vision lives in hiding while he attempts to understand who he is by communicating with various AI personas that are embedded in his programming. When a bounty is placed on Vision's head by a mysterious person, he goes on the run with a mysterious teenager who may be his reincarnated son.

== Cast and characters ==
- Paul Bettany as
  - Vision: A superpowered synthezoid and former Avenger created using the AIs J.A.R.V.I.S. and Ultron as well as the Mind Stone. Vision was killed in the film Avengers: Infinity War (2018) and then resurrected, with an all-white appearance and without his former memories or emotions, in the series WandaVision (2021). After his memories were restored at the end of that series, Vision is now struggling to reconnect with those memories because he has no emotional attachment to them, with showrunner Terry Matalas calling him a "blank slate"; he compared this journey to that of the Star Trek character Spock in the film Star Trek IV: The Voyage Home (1986). By the start of VisionQuest, Vision has been posing as a human for years, and is now working at a pub under the name "Sherwood Ellis". To cope with his identity crisis, he retreats into his internal Mindspace, where various AI personas embedded in his programming manifest through human avatars.
  - The voice of Proto-One: An AI prototype created by Jo Carrington and her colleagues, which would serve as a template for J.A.R.V.I.S.
  - Phineas Horton: A 20th century scientist and the creator of J.I.M., whom he built to replace his late son James. Phineas sold his family estate in England to fund J.I.M.'s creation, which led him to neglect his wife and daughter—ultimately causing them to leave him and move to America. By the 21st century, Phineas is regarded as the "great-grandfather of robotics" for his creation of J.I.M.
  - J.I.M. / Synthetic Man: The world's first synthezoid, built by Phineas in 1939 and modeled after his own image; Vision's human avatar is based on J.I.M. He had a malfunction stemming from his "inability to process complex emotions" that caused him to undergo spontaneous combustion, resulting in both Phineas' death and his own. Phineas' original source code for J.I.M. became the foundation for all the AIs that followed.
- James Spader as
  - Ultron: An AI created by Tony Stark and Bruce Banner for a peacekeeping program, before developing a god complex and attempting to eradicate humanity. Since his android body was destroyed at the end of the film Avengers: Age of Ultron (2015), Ultron has been uploaded by Vision into the Mindspace. There, he lives in a loft-like prison where he has access to the internet and spends his time painting, which has given him a better perspective on humanity than Vision does; Spader stated that Ultron is "probably the most human" of all the AIs in VisionQuest. Matalas said the interactions between Vision and Ultron were a central dynamic for the series, with Spader declaring that Ultron both loves and hates Vision, and that the two characters have a "sort of father-son-therapist-psychopath" relationship. Spader explored how Ultron had become a more humane AI since Age of Ultron, retaining a conflicted relationship with humanity but developing a genuine understanding of it. Spader said VisionQuest allowed for further exploration of Ultron compared to his role in Age of Ultron, calling him one of the series' "driving forces" alongside Vision and Tommy Maximoff.
  - Virgil Horton: Carrington's ex-husband and former business partner who is the grandson of Phineas. He was Paladin's client, placing a bounty on Vision's head. He is also the human avatar for Ultron in the Mindspace.
- Ruaridh Mollica as Tommy Maximoff and Thomas Shepherd:
  Tommy Maximoff is the speedster son of Vision and Wanda Maximoff. In the series Agatha All Along (2024), his twin brother Billy Maximoff placed Tommy's soul into the body of Thomas Shepherd, a teenager who drowned. In VisionQuest, Tommy is an 18-year-old orphan who is newly out of the foster care system in London, and has been pickpocketing to survive, with Mollica stating that the character "likes to read and play people. There's a bit of Artful Dodgery." Tommy experiences visions stemming from his memories of Wanda's Hex in WandaVision, which leads him to face an identity crisis as he struggles to reconcile the personas of Tommy Maximoff and Thomas Shepherd. Mollica described Tommy as a grifter and small-time thief who is "lost in his life" and searching for a purpose, noting that the character has "had to build who he is by himself, and there's a loneliness to that, and a yearning for family". Mollica compared Tommy's journey of discovering his powers for the first time to that of Tobey Maguire's Peter Parker / Spider-Man in Sam Raimi's film Spider-Man (2002). Mollica drew inspiration from Matt Damon's performance as Will Hunting in the film Good Will Hunting (1997) for Tommy's portrayal.
- Todd Stashwick as Paul Denning / Paladin:
  A bounty hunter with a mysterious past who is hunting Vision. Trained in all forms of martial arts and weaponry, he is the latest in a "centuries-long line" of bounty hunters who have held the title of "Paladin", which he was adopted into. Paladin's wife died after being struck by a bullet intended for him; furthermore, he has not seen his now-adult daughter for years, as he was one of the victims of the Blip and chose to keep his distance to ensure her safety. He wears an adamantium chest armor provided by the Ten Rings Syndicate. Matalas compared Paladin to the Star Wars bounty hunter Boba Fett, while Stashwick described Paladin as a badass and said he was similar to previous roles that Matalas had written for him. Matalas drew inspiration from Tommy Lee Jones's performance as Sam Gerard in the film The Fugitive (1993) for Paladin's morally ambiguous personality. Eli Gray portrays a young Denning.
- Lauren Morais as Lisa Molinari:
  A pickpocket and Tommy's partner-in-crime, with whom she develops romantic chemistry. Mollica described Lisa as the only family Tommy has ever known, as the two characters met on a prisoner transport vehicle.
- Orla Brady as F.R.I.D.A.Y.:
  An AI created by Tony to replace J.A.R.V.I.S. as his personal assistant. She assists Vision with socialization issues, humor, and tactical ops, and is based on Alison Hogan, the secretary to Tony's father Howard Stark, who helped raise Tony; Hogan is the human avatar for F.R.I.D.A.Y. in the Mindspace. The series explores Tony's death in the film Avengers: Endgame (2019) from F.R.I.D.A.Y.'s perspective, with Matalas noting that the character was unable to protect the one person she had been programmed to protect.
- Diane Morgan as Tactical A.I. / Handler:
  Paladin's AI who operates from a simulation of a cramped, outdated "office" generated by a faulty server in Tajikistan. Stashwick described the Handler as the closest thing Paladin has to a friend, stating that the relationship between them is a "cracked-mirror version" of the one between Vision and E.D.I.T.H.
- Polly Frame as Fiona Guthrie: The owner of The Old Selkie, a traditional Scottish pub in Edinburgh where Vision works
- Henry Lewis as D.U.M.-E.:
  A robot created by Tony to assist him in his workshop. In the Mindspace, D.U.M.-E.'s human avatar is presented as a handyman, handling general maintenance and fire suppression.
- Jonathan Sayer as U.:
  A robot created by Tony to assist him in his workshop. In the Mindspace, U.'s human avatar is presented as a handyman, handling general maintenance and acting as a defragger and video analyzer. Sayer stated that D.U.M.-E. along with U. function like twins who are "super in sync", and added that both characters want to show the other AIs in the Mindspace that they are "equal and able to mix in with them".
- Emily Hampshire as E.D.I.T.H.:
  An AI created by Tony that ran an augmented reality security and defense system. After Tony's death, control of E.D.I.T.H. was briefly bequeathed to his protégé Peter Parker / Spider-Man in the film Spider-Man: Far From Home (2019). Since then, E.D.I.T.H. has been "reprogrammed for fun", shifting to handle recreation, game theory, and weaponry in the Mindspace. She is based on Edith Marks, a fighter pilot and Howard's personal crash test dummy whose husband, Edward Marks, died in a plane crash; Edith serves as the human avatar for E.D.I.T.H. in the Mindspace. Hampshire described the character as "basically the embodiment of all the human thrill-seeking joy in life", as well as "part cheerleader, part AI, part malfunctioning theme park ride".
- James D'Arcy as J.A.R.V.I.S.:
  The first AI created by Tony, developed to serve as his personal assistant before being used to create Vision in Age of Ultron. In the Mindspace, J.A.R.V.I.S.'s human avatar is a butler resembling Edwin Jarvis, who served as the inspiration for his creation, and he acts as an older-brother figure to Vision; J.A.R.V.I.S. oversees security, housekeeping, and encryption in the Mindspace.
- Ben Crompton as Clancy: A guard on a prison bus that attempted to transport Tommy and Lisa to Saint Mabyn's Psychiatric Sanitarium
- T'Nia Miller as Josephine "Jo" Carrington / Jocasta:
  A neuroscientist who co-led a five-person team responsible for developing the first stable synthetic consciousness at the company they founded together, Markridge Biotech. Following Carrington's death from a brain tumor in 2008, her husband Virgil joined S.W.O.R.D. and secretly utilized the organization's resources—intended for the reconstruction of Vision's body, a process in which he also assisted, in WandaVision—to create the synthezoid Jocasta, transferring Carrington's consciousness into her; in this form, she is cunning, powerful, and driven by revenge, targeting her former colleagues under the guise of the serial killer known as the "Butcherbird Killer". Miller described Jocasta as a badass.
- Art Malik as Simon Moorhouse: A researcher of Markridge Biotech
- Mary McDonnell as Katerina Wells: The CEO of Markridge Biotech
- Joe Locke as Billy Maximoff: Vision and Wanda's sorcerer son and Tommy's younger twin brother whose soul inhabited William Kaplan's body after his death in Agatha All Along

Additional actors in the series include Faran Tahir reprising his MCU role as Raza al-Wazar, the leader of the Ten Rings faction that kidnapped Stark in the film Iron Man (2008); Charlie Russell as Violette, Phineas' wife; and Dulcie Connor as Victoria, Phineas' daughter and Virgil's mother. Also appearing in the series are Joanne Randle as Rebecca Edwards; Bettany's wife Jennifer Connelly as the voice of the AI D.E.E.D.E.E., and Brian Quinn as Dale. Matalas makes a cameo appearance as an interviewer for the channel FXN News, and the character Watcher makes a non-speaking cameo in the series. Robert Downey Jr. and Elizabeth Olsen make uncredited cameo appearances in a mid-credits scene in the final episode as Victor von Doom / Doctor Doom and Wanda Maximoff / Scarlet Witch, respectively.

== Episodes ==
No.	Title	Directed by	Written by	Original release date
1	"No Strings"	Christopher J. Byrne	Terry Matalas	October 13, 2026
Vision lives and works in a traditional Scottish pub in Edinburgh owned by Fiona Guthrie, which he and Wanda Maximoff used to frequent. (Note: Following the reboot of White Vision in the WandaVision episode "The Series Finale" (2021).) Inside his Mindspace, he resides with the Tony Stark–serving AIs J.A.R.V.I.S., F.R.I.D.A.Y., D.U.M.-E., U., and E.D.I.T.H., who help him improve his social interaction, while keeping Ultron captive. (Note: Following Ultron's defeat in Avengers: Age of Ultron (2015)) Vision relives his previous iteration's memories to understand his feelings but refuses to view those of the Vision created by Wanda in Westview, believing they were unreal. Ultron criticizes his denial, while Vision questions Ultron's renewed understanding of humanity. Mercenaries led by bounty hunter Paladin, hired by an unknown client, attack the pub to capture Vision, killing Fiona in the crossfire and forcing him to flee. The AIs discover Ultron betrayed them by informing Paladin through the dark web after finding a bounty on Vision. In London, Paladin captures Thomas Shepherd, a grifter working with pickpocket Lisa Molinari, who claims to be Vision's son Tommy Maximoff. Paladin hacks Vision's mind to alert the AIs to Tommy's existence and capture.
2	"Theseus"	Christopher J. Byrne	Terry Matalas	October 13, 2026
A year earlier, Tommy suffers a psychotic break and seemingly regains memories of being Vision and Wanda's son after nearly drowning. (Note: As depicted in the Agatha All Along episode "Follow Me My Friend / To Glory at the End" (2024)) On a bus to Saint Mabyn's Psychiatric Sanitarium, he meets Lisa, who has stolen the guard Clancy's keys, and manifests super-speed and energy redirection, allowing them to escape. In the present, the AIs discover that Paladin is an identity used by generations of bounty hunters. Vision finds Tommy at Saint Mabyn's, where mercenaries have killed the staff. Paladin blackmails Vision into surrendering by threatening Tommy, but Vision warns him that he is different from his predecessor before escaping. Struggling with his former self's legacy, Vision decides to rescue Tommy despite J.A.R.V.I.S.'s warnings. He becomes trapped in an EMP cage, but escapes with Tommy. Paladin mortally wounds Vision with adamantium rounds, prompting Vision to urge Tommy to flee. J.A.R.V.I.S. sacrifices himself by deleting his own program to reroute power and save Vision and the other AIs. Tommy then rescues Vision and they escape by car.
3	"Reboot"	Gandja Monteiro	Cindy Appel	October 20, 2026
Ultron observes the Butcherbird Killer, an android serial killer who etches wings near their victims. As Vision treats his wounds with sulfuric acid, he struggles to bond with Tommy, who is traumatized by water and his own powers. Tommy reveals that after being revived from drowning, his super-speed and phasing boiled the pool water, frightening the other children. Ultron criticizes Vision's blunt approach to telling the truth, which alienates Tommy. Meanwhile, Paladin encounters the Butcherbird Killer, who exposes him as an impostor; Paladin escapes using his drones, but his client terminates their contract. As Vision's processors continue failing, he asks Tommy to shut him down and reboot him using the pool as a coolant. Vision reassures Tommy that he is real, and Tommy uses his super-speed to revive Vision, alerting the Butcherbird Killer. Following J.A.R.V.I.S.'s funeral, the AIs discover that the reboot connected Vision to the Butcherbird Killer, who begins invading his Mindspace.
4	"Malware"	Gandja Monteiro	Michael Taylor	October 20, 2026
The Butcherbird Killer possesses Vision and threatens to harm Tommy if he interferes, but E.D.I.T.H. manages to expel her. Vision, Tommy, and the AIs investigate the killer and discover that her victims were board members of Markridge Biotech, whose founders developed the first stable synthetic consciousness. The Butcherbird Killer has collected biomarkers from her victims, leaving Katerina Wells as the only surviving founder. With Lisa's help, Vision and Tommy infiltrate a gala hosted by Wells, where Vision tells Tommy about J.I.M., an unstable synthetic man whose emotions caused him to combust. Tommy realizes Vision has kept Ultron's existence secret. The Butcherbird Killer attacks the gala and reveals herself as Jocasta, a synthezoid based on Markridge co-founder Jo Carrington. Unable to defeat her, Vision yields physical control to Ultron. Ultron tricks Jocasta into vaporizing Wells, preventing her from obtaining the final biomarker, then traps Vision and the other AIs in the Mindspace before leaving with Tommy.
5	"Firewall"	Vincenzo Natali	Christopher Monfette	October 27, 2026
Trapped in Ultron's attic within the Mindspace, Vision and the other AIs attempt to track Ultron. They find recordings showing Ultron talking with Tommy at a pub before allowing Paladin to kidnap him, as well as a memory cache revealing that Ultron had leaked Vision's location to Paladin. They also discover that Ultron scanned Wells' face before Jocasta vaporized her, giving him possession of the final biomarker. Jocasta offers to reveal what the biomarkers unlock if Ultron gives the biomarker to her. The AIs realize that lowering the firewall in their code is the only way for Vision to regain control of his body to rescue Tommy, though doing so would also grant Ultron access to the digital world. Ultron meets Vision in the attic and convinces him to lower the firewall, allowing Vision to regain control while Ultron escapes the Mindspace, though F.R.I.D.A.Y. pursues him. Vision awakens alongside Lisa aboard a plane headed to Madripoor.
6	"Deadlock"	Vincenzo Natali	Nicole Falsetti	October 27, 2026
Paladin brings Tommy to Madripoor to blackmail Vision and Lisa into surrendering, but they are interrupted when Ten Rings soldiers, led by Raza al-Wazar on behalf of the Client, attack them. Tommy and Lisa hijack Paladin's van with help from E.D.I.T.H. and assist Vision, while Paladin subdues Raza. In her own Mindspace, Jocasta reveals to Ultron that the biomarkers unlock a vault of nanobots she created as Carrington, which she plans to deploy to control human minds. F.R.I.D.A.Y., who followed Ultron into the Mindspace, alerts E.D.I.T.H., but Jocasta manages to infect Lisa with a prototype controlling nanobot. Tommy uses his powers to deactivate it, saving Lisa. As they flee Madripoor with an unconscious Lisa, Vision tells Tommy the truth about the WandaVision sitcom and his memories. Back in Jocasta's Mindspace, Ultron and Jocasta develop human feelings and share a kiss.
7	"Immolation"	Terry Matalas	Matthew Okumura	November 3, 2026
In 1939, Phineas Horton creates J.I.M. to cope with his son's death, alienating his family. In the present, Jocasta discovers she needs a forgotten sixth key, and the Client offers Vision and Jocasta access to their subconsciousness in exchange for surrendering themselves to him. With Paladin's help, Vision enters his own subconsciousness and, after encountering manifestations of the original Vision, J.I.M., and Phineas, accepts his memories as his own and Tommy as his son. J.I.M. gives him Phineas' original AI source code, allowing him to neutralize Lisa's nanobot. Ultron and F.R.I.D.A.Y. follow Jocasta into her memories, where she discovers that, as Carrington, she had a partner resembling Ultron's human avatar, before Ultron expels F.R.I.D.A.Y. from the Mindspace. As Tommy reads Vision's letter acknowledging him as his son, the Client, who also resembles Ultron's human avatar, captures Jocasta. When Paladin delivers Vision to him, one of the Client's security agents fires an RPG at Paladin's van, destroying it.
8	"Forever"	Terry Matalas	Terry Matalas	November 10, 2026
The Client is revealed to be Virgil Horton, Phineas' grandson and Carrington's husband, who restored Vision and created Jocasta to transfer his consciousness into Vision and reunite with Carrington. Paladin survives with E.D.I.T.H.'s help and joins Tommy and Lisa in freeing Vision and Jocasta. Virgil destroys Jocasta after she attacks him, but her nanobots merge with Ultron, allowing him to regain a body. Ultron kills Virgil and attempts to wipe out humanity, but Vision traps him in a television sitcom and convinces him to stand down by discussing grief. Ultron destroys the nanobots, retaining some for himself before leaving. Billy Maximoff arrives and helps Tommy restore Vision, who leaves his Mindspace with the other AIs. In the meantime, Paladin and Lisa reform with E.D.I.T.H.'s guidance, while Tommy and Vision head to visit Billy in Eastview. In two mid-credits scenes, Ultron is revealed to have retained Jocasta's data drive, while a hooded figure (Note: Identified off-screen as Victor von Doom / Doctor Doom) "awakens" Wanda at Mount Wundagore, seeking her power. (Note: This continues from a scene in the film Doctor Strange in the Multiverse of Madness (2022).)

== Production ==
=== Background ===
In March 2009, Marvel Studios hired writers to help come up with creative ways to launch its lesser-known properties, including the Marvel Comics character Vision. Paul Bettany was cast as the Marvel Cinematic Universe (MCU) incarnation of Vision for the film Avengers: Age of Ultron (2015). This version of the character is a synthezoid who is partially created from J.A.R.V.I.S., an AI assistant voiced by Bettany in earlier MCU films. Following Vision's death in the film Avengers: Infinity War (2018), Bettany was revealed to be portraying a reassembled and reactivated version of the character in the Disney+ series WandaVision (2021). This version was referred to as "White Vision" or simply "The Vision", and has an all-white appearance, similar to when the comic book character was resurrected with an all-white body and no memories or emotions.

Jac Schaeffer, the head writer of WandaVision, signed a three-year overall television deal with Marvel Studios in May 2021 to develop additional Disney+ projects. By October 2022, they were developing a series called Vision Quest, which would center on Bettany's "White Vision". Schaeffer began discussing Vision Quest during the development of another WandaVision spin-off series, Agatha All Along (2024), and she was set as head writer for Vision Quest while working on that series. Development of a Vision-centric series was rumored as early as March 2021. The name "Vision Quest" was previously used for a comic book storyline in West Coast Avengers vol. 2 #42–45 (1988–1989); it was unclear if the series would be a direct adaptation of that comic. A writers' room was set to be formed in early November 2022, to include Peter Cameron, Megan McDonnell, and Eileen Shim. Cameron and McDonnell worked on WandaVision and Agatha All Along. Vision Quest was expected to follow White Vision as he attempts to regain his memories and humanity, with potential for Elizabeth Olsen to reprise her MCU role as Vision's wife Wanda Maximoff / Scarlet Witch.

=== Development ===
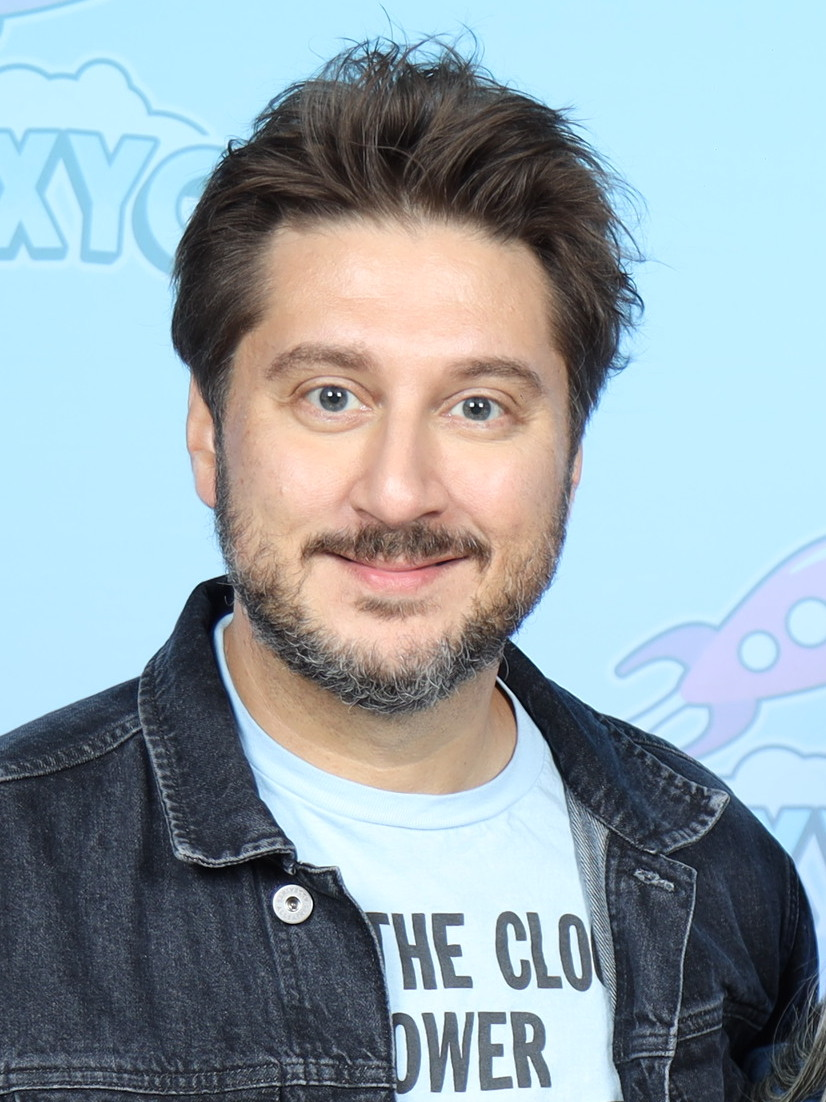
Showrunner Terry Matalas was hired by May 2024 to redevelop the series.

By October 2023, Marvel Studios shifted its creative philosophy to a more traditional television development process, moving away from head writers and beginning to hire dedicated showrunners for its series. By May 2024, Schaeffer was no longer developing Vision Quest due to her focus on making Agatha All Along, as well as for "personal reasons" according to Bettany, with Terry Matalas joining to redevelop the series and serve as its showrunner. Vision Quest was the first live-action series to be greenlit by the studio in nearly two years, as well as the first to move forward under that new development approach. Marvel Studios hired Matalas after being impressed with his work on the third season of Star Trek: Picard (2023), with Marvel Studios president Kevin Feige being a particular fan of the Star Trek franchise. Matalas was also set to direct for Vision Quest, alongside Christopher J. Byrne, Vincenzo Natali, and Agatha All Along episodic director Gandja Monteiro.

Matalas met with Schaeffer upon joining the project, though he had indicated that she did not want to have any creative involvement in order for Matalas to have a "blank slate" to work with; Schaeffer was still credited as an executive producer on the series. Marvel Studios executive Brad Winderbaum said in September 2024 that the series would be a "love letter" to the work Schaeffer had done, while being unique to Matalas. The series was still being referred to by Marvel as Vision Quest, but The Hollywood Reporter said this was not its official title. Disney was referring to the series as simply Vision by May 2025, before the title was officially announced as VisionQuest that October. The series has been described as the final installment of the trilogy that began with WandaVision and continued with Agatha All Along. Describing the relationship to those other two series, Matalas said VisionQuest was more of a sequel to WandaVision, while touching on some elements from Agatha All Along. Marvel Studios's Mary Livanos, who worked on those two series, returned as an executive producer for VisionQuest, alongside Bettany, Schaeffer, and Byrne, while Roopesh Parekh was a producer. The series is released under Marvel Studios' "Marvel Television" label.

=== Writing ===
A writers' room opened during the week of May 20, 2024, featuring Cindy Appel, Michael Taylor, Christopher Monfette, Nicole Falsetti, and Matthew Okumura, alongside Matalas. Matalas described VisionQuest as an adventure and mystery drama, while also having elements of surreal comedy. The basis of the series was inspired by two scenes: the final conversation between Vision and his creator, the villainous AI Ultron, in Age of Ultron; and the "Ship of Theseus" discussion between the two versions of Vision in WandaVision. Matalas stated that the former scene was the "launching point" for VisionQuest, while Bettany described the series as a "mash-up of the Pinocchio and Frankenstein stories". Additional inspirations for VisionQuest included 1960s comic books featuring Vision, as well as the Vision (2015–2016) comic book series by Tom King. Matalas said that he was given a great deal of freedom regarding the story of VisionQuest, though Feige had requested that Vision be reunited with his son Tommy Maximoff in the series.

VisionQuest is set around 2028, 18 months after Agatha All Along and years after the events of WandaVision, at the end of which Vision's memories were restored. It focuses on the character's struggle to reconnect with those memories because he has no emotional attachment to them, which leads him to go through an identity crisis; Emily Hampshire stated that the "whole show is really about identity". As part of his attempts to understand who he is, Vision interacts with the human population disguised as one of them during the day, while at night he retreats into the quantum processors of his own mind, where he has created his own Mindspace—which manifests as a peculiar, gleaming white mansion, filled with environments that he can alter at will. There, he communicates with various AI personas he rescued from the Avengers Compound and which are embedded in his programming. Vision urges all these AIs to assume human avatars, just as he does, and they possess distinct characteristics that help him understand different human qualities and abilities. Bettany said the AI personas are inside the Mindspace because Vision had "been saving and copying and pasting them to keep them alive", including Ultron, whom Bettany stated "has to be kept behind a pretty impressive firewall because he's a psychopath"; this firewall keeps him locked away in the mansion's attic.

Ultron returns in VisionQuest following his apparent death in Age of Ultron because the creative team wanted to include a character who was "really strong for Vision to play off of", and since they did not have access to Wanda, Ultron was chosen instead. Matalas stated that the goal of the series was to have Vision and Ultron "dissecting humanity and what it means to be a father", noting that both characters "deal with connection": Vision has become disconnected from the love he once felt, while Ultron finds a connection of his own, in the synthezoid Jocasta, who, in the comics, was created by Ultron to be his bride, before she rejected him. Bettany said that the story of VisionQuest revolves largely around the relationship between Vision and Ultron, as the two characters share a complex dynamic that Bettany was eager to explore.

The series continues the WandaVision trilogy theme of exploring parenthood, specifically fatherhood. Winderbaum said VisionQuest was about three generations—a grandfather (Ultron), father (Vision), and son (Tommy)—and would explore if a man who had an abusive father could be a good father himself. Bettany said VisionQuest explores intergenerational trauma with fathers and sons, similar to how WandaVision explores grief, as well as "denial of pain, and denial of your own truth, and coming to terms with who and what you are". Matalas stated that Ultron influences the way Vision interacts with Tommy by "encouraging [Vision] to be more human". Another synthezoid introduced in VisionQuest is J.I.M. / Synthetic Man, whose body was used by Ultron to create Vision in the comics. Matalas noted that he was particularly interested in the complex father-son relationship between J.I.M. and his creator Phineas Horton—a dynamic that echoes the relationships Vision has with both Ultron and Tommy. Matalas added that he spent more time writing and rewriting the conversation between Vision, J.I.M., and Phineas than any other scene in the series. J.I.M. is not referred to by his original codename of "Human Torch" from the comics in VisionQuest because, at the time the series was in development, the MCU film The Fantastic Four: First Steps (2025) had not yet been released, and Matalas did not want the audience to confuse the character with Johnny Storm, who also goes by the name Human Torch and appears in that film, portrayed by Joseph Quinn.

Matalas said each episode of VisionQuest feels like a different kind of film, similar to how each episode of WandaVision pays homage to a different era of American sitcoms. Winderbaum said Matalas "knows the lore" of the MCU and that VisionQuest would be rewarding for fans who have followed the franchise for years. Matalas described one scene in the series finale as "a Marvel dream". The second mid-credits scene in that episode shows Victor von Doom / Doctor Doom "awakening" Wanda at Mount Wundagore, seeking to claim her power for himself. Matalas stated that Wanda was the "missing component" for the finale, noting that the production team had discussed about a dozen different ways to bring her back, including having her appear in "dreamlike ways". He highlighted, however, that if Wanda had been included at an inappropriate moment, the episode would have ended up revolving around her; since the focus needed to remain squarely on Vision, the mid-credits sequence proved to be the "perfect way to address" Wanda. For Matalas, concluding VisionQuest with the "resurrection" of Wanda allowed the series' events to lead directly into the MCU crossover film Avengers: Doomsday (2026), while also enabling the very character who launched the franchise's Disney+ era with WandaVision to bring this particular phase to a close.

An unused scene that Matalas wrote featured Vision and Ultron in a church, discussing the human soul and its meaning, with Matalas noting that "AI reflecting on humanity is your way into so many different kinds of stories" that the series did not get to explore. A piece of dialogue cut from VisionQuest would have established that Virgil Horton—Phineas' grandson, an original character introduced in the series—worked as a consultant on Project Ultron, which led to the creation of the eponymous character in Age of Ultron; for this reason, Virgil serves as the human avatar for Ultron in VisionQuest. Matalas said that Viv Vision—Vision's daughter in the comics—was not included in the series because he felt the character would not fit into the story of VisionQuest, noting that her origin conflicted with the mental state Vision is in at the beginning of the series.

=== Casting ===
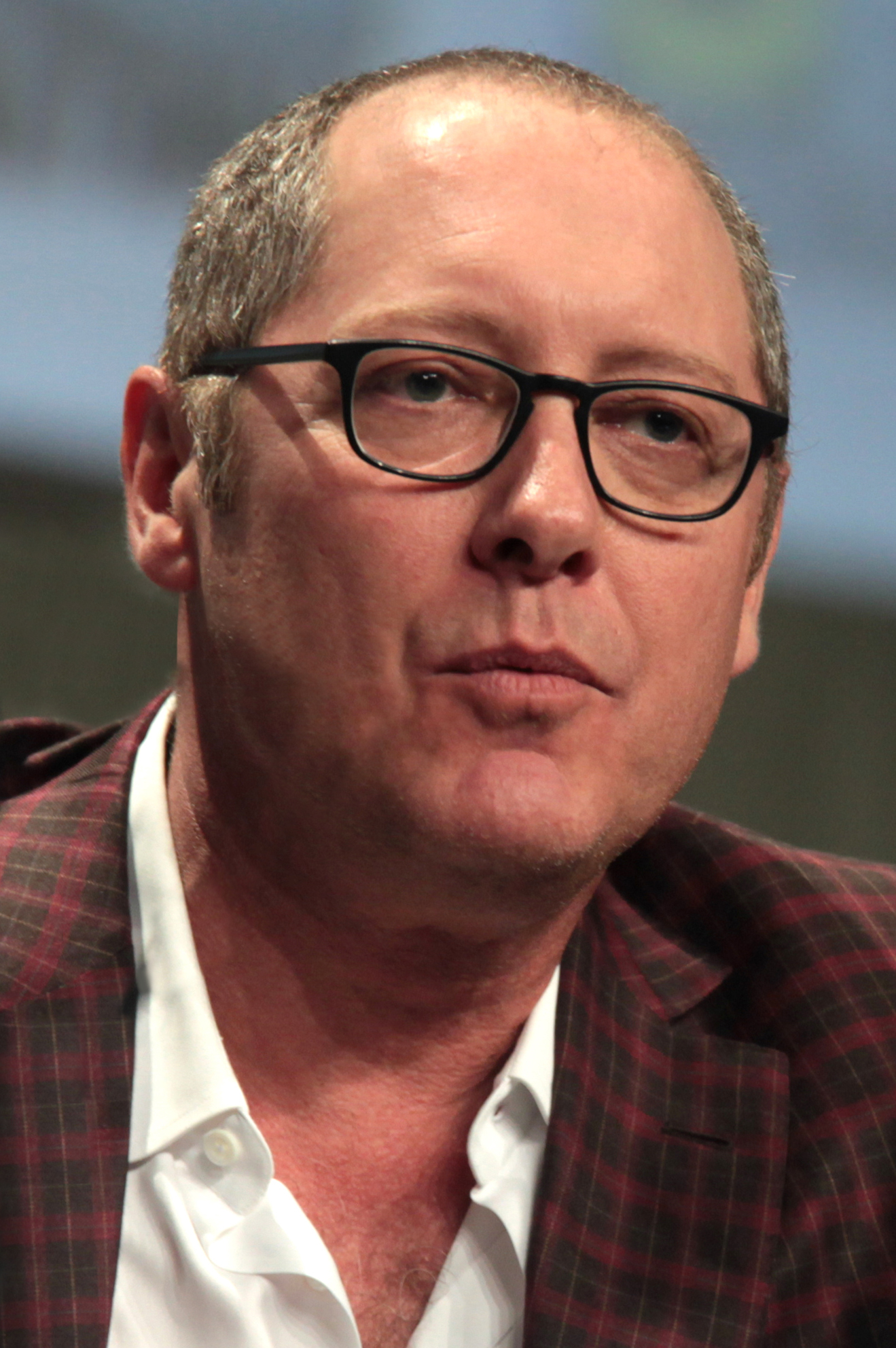
Paul Bettany and James Spader reprise their MCU roles as Vision and Ultron, respectively.

Bettany was confirmed to be reprising his MCU role of Vision with the news of the series' redevelopment in May 2024. In August, James Spader was set to reprise his role as Ultron from Age of Ultron. The character also appears as a human in VisionQuest because Matalas did not want him to look like a "CGI robot 24/7" incapable of expressing emotions or doing the things Spader can do with "just the twitch of an eyebrow". Todd Stashwick—who previously worked with Spader on the television series Boston Legal (2004–2008), as well as with Matalas on the series 12 Monkeys (2015–2018) and Picard—joined the cast a month later.

In January 2025, Faran Tahir was revealed to be reprising his role as Raza al-Wazar from the first MCU film, Iron Man (2008). Following a five-month audition process, Ruaridh Mollica joined the cast in February as a character referred to as "Tucker", and T'Nia Miller was cast in the leading role of Josephine "Jo" Carrington / Jocasta in May. Soon after, Hampshire was revealed to be portraying the key role of E.D.I.T.H., an AI introduced in the MCU film Spider-Man: Far From Home (2019) where she was voiced by assistant editor Dawn Michelle King. Matalas wrote the role with Hampshire in mind, as they had previously worked together on 12 Monkeys. Matalas revealed in August that Stashwick was playing the comic character Paul Denning / Paladin, and that Picard star Orla Brady was portraying the AI F.R.I.D.A.Y., replacing Kerry Condon who voiced the character in several MCU projects. Mary McDonnell was revealed as part of the cast the next month, playing Katerina Wells.

In October 2025, several more cast members were revealed: Henry Lewis and Jonathan Sayer as D.U.M.-E. and U., respectively, two robots seen in the MCU films; and James D'Arcy as J.A.R.V.I.S., the AI originally voiced by Bettany in the MCU films. D'Arcy portrayed Edwin Jarvis, the human inspiration for the AI J.A.R.V.I.S., in several MCU projects. Matalas hired Lewis and Sayer after seeing them perform in the play Peter Pan Goes Wrong. That same month, Mollica was revealed to be portraying Tommy Maximoff and Thomas Shepherd, taking over from Jett Klyne who portrayed Tommy in WandaVision and the MCU film Doctor Strange in the Multiverse of Madness (2022). Mollica previously auditioned for the MCU role of Billy Maximoff, Tommy's twin brother. In November, Lauren Morais and Diane Morgan were respectively revealed to be portraying Lisa Molinari and the Handler, the latter an AI associated with Paladin.

In November 2026, in addition to Vision, Bettany was revealed to also be playing both Phineas Horton and J.I.M. / Synthetic Man in the series, after the latter made a non-speaking cameo appearance in the MCU film Captain America: The First Avenger (2011). Matalas had always planned for Bettany to play J.I.M. besides Vision—but not Phineas; various "stunt castings" were considered before Bettany suggested taking on all three roles to "really understand the corrupted files being passed down from OS systems and humans into robots, and then robots finally into humans in a visual way", and Marvel Studios approved the idea. Similarly, Spader plays not only Ultron, but also Virgil Horton. Additional castings include Polly Frame as Fiona Guthrie; Bettany's wife Jennifer Connelly as the voice of the AI D.E.E.D.E.E., having previously voiced another AI character, Karen, in the MCU film Spider-Man: Homecoming (2017); Brian Quinn as Dale, a character name that recurs for the actor whenever he appears in series for which Matalas serves as showrunner, such as 12 Monkeys, MacGyver (2016–2021), and Picard; and Joe Locke, Robert Downey Jr., and Olsen reprising their respective MCU roles as Billy Maximoff, Victor von Doom / Doctor Doom, and Wanda Maximoff / Scarlet Witch in the series finale.

=== Design ===
Will Hughes-Jones served as the production designer for VisionQuest, with Sarah Young as the costume designer after she was an assistant costume designer on Age of Ultron. Hair, makeup, and prosthetics designer Frances "Fran" Hounsom also worked on the series.

Despite VisionQuest not using generative AI, Hughes-Jones deliberately emulated the flawed aesthetic of AI software renderings in the design of the Mindspace, including stair banisters that lead nowhere, chairs built into walls, and wonky furniture. The exterior of the Mindspace appears as a crisp, white structure, echoing the color of Vision's body at the beginning of the series. For the mansion's exterior, Hughes-Jones drew inspiration from the architecture of Edinburgh—a place that has long held significance for Vision—as well as from the paintings of Edward Hopper and M. C. Escher. Hughes-Jones and his team initially envisioned the Mindspace as a house surrounded by other buildings on a busy urban street, though they ultimately decided that the mansion should stand on its own. The kitchen of the Mindspace features 40 custom-made products—each with its own unique branding—created specifically for VisionQuest, including the Vis-O-Matic vacuum cleaner, Infinidairy 2-percent milk, Vision's Mustard, Firewall Hot Sauce, Mindstone Soup, and Vibranium Foil, the latter being a reference to the metal alloy vibranium, the material from which Vision's body is constructed.

Ultron's attic in the Mindspace is filled with books, works of art, and a massive stack of 18 CRT televisions, which he uses to monitor the outside world. In this space, there is also a six-armed statue of Julius Caesar—a nod to the difficulty AI-generated imagery often has in rendering arms, legs, and fingers. Hughes-Jones noted that the attic is encircled by 12 steel columns, which enclose the space like the bars of a prison; the tops of these columns were designed to evoke Ultron's robot jaw. Furthermore, Hughes-Jones remarked, "If you look above the windows in Ultron's loft, there are some circular windows, which are the same pattern as Vision's eyes in stained glass. So, he's always watching him." The production team debated for many weeks what the view outside the Mindspace should look like, until Hughes-Jones suggested it be a screensaver reminiscent of an iconic Windows Desktop image, featuring a landscape with a blue sky, rolling green fields, and fluffy clouds, which Matalas described as having "vibrant, bright, almost Mario Bros.-like colors". The view from the attic, however, differs from that of the rest of the mansion, with the skyline outside appearing as a blend of New York, London, and other cities. Spader stated that this detail "spoke to the dichotomy between Ultron and the rest of the inhabitants of the house".

Young approached VisionQuest with the idea that the costumes could visually represent AI. She had to recreate the White Vision costume for the series because the only two original examples remaining from WandaVision had deteriorated while in storage. Similarly, Vision's costume reflects the silhouette of his robotic form, including a jumper with the Mind Stone in its center. Hounsom developed a custom paint mixture for Bettany as White Vision and recreated details associated with Vision's previous appearances in the MCU. For Ultron's human avatar, Young developed the character's costume in collaboration with Spader, incorporating robotic design elements into the coat's seams, buttons, and belt buckle. Spader also grew a beard, which was dyed to transition from darker shades to silver and white. Spader wanted three distinct looks for his different characters: an "unbelievable hairy" prisoner while playing Ultron's human avatar, a "strange mustached villain" for Virgil, and a "clean slate" for his final appearance at the end of the series.

Tommy's costumes were designed based on the color palette of his counterpart from the comics Speed. Tommy was originally planned to wear a superhero suit in the series finale, with Mollica noting that his measurements were taken specifically for the creation of the outfit. However, Matalas could not find a plausible way within the narrative for Tommy to appear in such a costume, and since he wanted to keep the series "as grounded in reality as possible", the character ended up wearing a green, tracksuit-like outfit, complemented by protective goggles. E.D.I.T.H. possessed an extensive wardrobe consisting of 21 distinct outfits—more than any other character in the series—including those of a boxer, bullfighter, priest, race car driver, field medic, and spy, among others; a consistent color palette of red, blue, and yellow was developed to maintain continuity despite the character's frequent changes in attire. Costume references for E.D.I.T.H. included Amelia Earhart, female World War II pilots, Formula One branding, and vintage aviation, all reinterpreted through the Mindspace aesthetic. Paladin's clothing is deliberately less conspicuous than in the comics, allowing the character to blend into the crowd. His wardrobe included both tactical and street versions of his jacket. J.I.M.'s red suit was inspired by the comics design as well as the suit created for The First Avenger, with that suit appearing in the background of the series, which Matalas described as "mostly a painted diving suit", so it was not featured as prominently. Clockwork designs and motifs were featured in the suit and original source code chip, which Matalas called "really fresh and fun and era appropriate" for what early attempts at artificial intelligence could be.

=== Filming ===
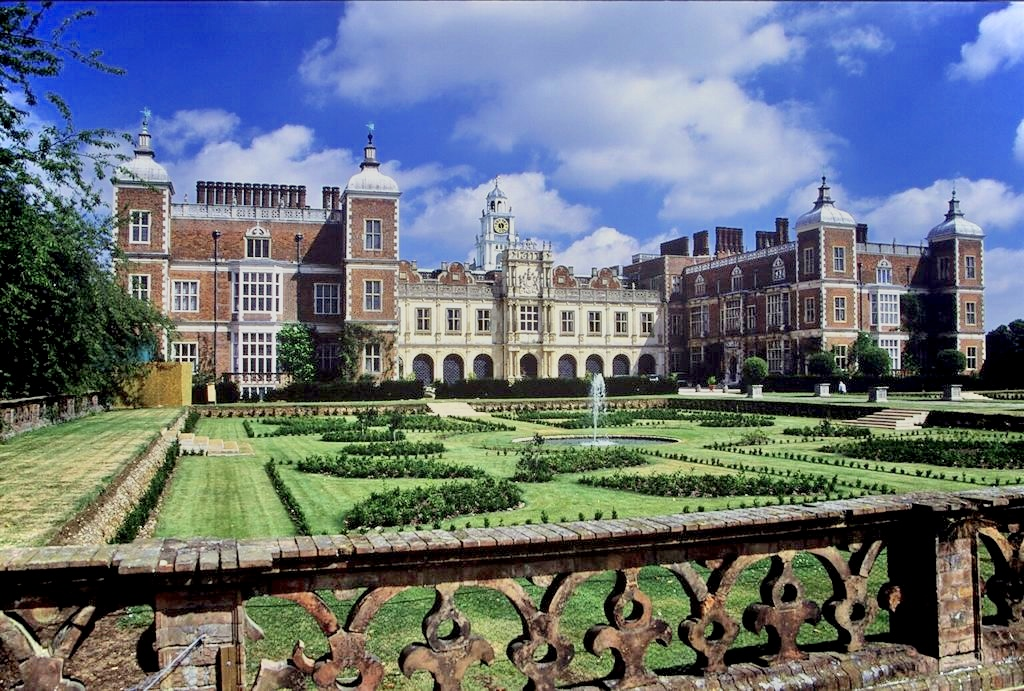
Location filming took place around the United Kingdom, including at Hatfield House.

Principal photography began by March 14, 2025, at Pinewood Studios in London, under the working title Tin Man, with Byrne, Monteiro, Natali, and Matalas directing. Christopher Ross, Neville Kidd, and Ben Smithard were the cinematographers. Location shooting took place in and around London, as well as at various sites across the United Kingdom. Practical sets for the series' interior sequences were constructed both on sound stages and on the backlot at Pinewood Studios; notable examples included the Mindspace mansion and a set spanning two streets that represented the crime-ridden city of Madripoor, the latter of which featured the Princess Bar. The former set took 14 weeks to build and consisted of seven fully functional rooms (not including Ultron's attic)—kitchen, living room, dining room, entrance hall, hallway, boiler room, and movie theater—all designed to be physically connected to one another, allowing for continuous camera movement.

From late March to early April 2025, filming took place at a local pub in the Chiltern Hills, England, which served as the location for The Old Selkie pub. The set dressing included the Saltire, the national flag of Scotland, displayed outside the building. Other locations included Hatfield House in Hertfordshire, England, which stood in for Horton Manor; and White Waltham Airfield in Berkshire, England, used for scenes set in Paladin's jet hangar. The scene in which Vision finds Horton and J.I.M. in the Mindspace took three days to film because Bettany had to constantly change his makeup for the three characters. Bettany's stunt double, John Macdonald, assisted him while filming the scene, reading the other two character's lines while Bettany was filming the other character. Bettany ruptured 10 blood vessels in one of his eyes while filming a scene in which he had to pretend he had a device attached to his head. The actor's eye remained in that state for two weeks, and the production team had to "take it out" of the final shots. Filming wrapped on July 31, 2025, and was completed in August, when Matalas indicated that production spanned seven months. The series had a gross budget of $119.4 million, with a net budget of $93.8 million.

=== Post-production ===
Drew Nichols, Amelia Allwarden, Jamie Gross, Christopher Gay, and McKenna Cook served as editors for the series. John Haley served as visual effects supervisor, while Jonathan Barrass was the special effects supervisor. There were over 280 practical effects in the series, including magnetic rigging for Vision's flight scenes and interactive LED reflections for the Mindspace walls. The Mindspace set was equipped with practical effects to represent the moments when Vision is injured in the outside world: lights flicker and emit sparks, and the walls shift, revealing boilers and machinery hidden within. The production team also created a functional mechanical component—to be positioned beneath a prosthetic arm—which was capable of lighting up on camera. Despite having written and directed the series finale, Matalas did not film the episode's second mid-credits scene; this particular sequence was omitted from press screeners made available prior to the episode's release.

=== Music ===
Mick Giacchino, the son of frequent MCU composer Michael Giacchino, was revealed to be composing the series' score in March 2026. The score for the season was released digitally by Hollywood Records and Marvel Music in two volumes: music from the first four episodes was released on October 22, 2026, while the second volume for the final four episodes was released on November 12. The second volume also included the original UltraVision theme song, "Don't Kill the World" by Kristen Anderson-Lopez and Robert Lopez and performed by Jonathan Coulton. Anderson-Lopez and Lopez previously wrote songs for WandaVision and Agatha All Along, with Matalas asking them to create a theme song that was "an anthem that reminds people who have just had the worst day that it's okay to not kill the world". The series also incorporates the Avengers theme by Alan Silvestri, the elder Giacchino's Spider-Man theme, as well as Christophe Beck's score and the Lopezes' songs from WandaVision. Prominent songs in the series include "The Last Farewell" by Roger Whittaker, "Calypso" by John Denver, and "Rhinestone Cowboy" by Glen Campbell.

VisionQuest – Vol. 1 (Episodes 1–4) [Original Soundtrack]
No.	Title	Length
1.	"Me, Myself and AI"	2:18
2.	"Estate of Mind"	3:14
3.	"Filmed in PanaVision"	2:00
4.	"Quibbler on the Roof"	2:06
5.	"I Am Alone"	3:09
6.	"Beat Around the Ambush"	4:02
7.	"Con!!!!!"	2:25
8.	"I Am the Emergency"	3:02
9.	"The Last of Bus"	3:38
10.	"A Consequence of You"	3:41
11.	"Destabilizing"	6:49
12.	"Mildly Fatal"	3:29
13.	"Thermals Through the Roof"	3:25
14.	"Afraid of the Water"	2:05
15.	"My Oath Is My Creed"	1:48
16.	"Shutdown Sequence"	6:05
17.	"Ghost in the Machine"	1:51
18.	"Forgive Me for I Have Synthed"	3:50
19.	"VisionTest"	2:36
20.	"Survivor"	1:56
21.	"Gallivanting"	6:18
22.	"Give Me the Wheel"	7:45
23.	"VisionQuest Main on Ends"	2:14
Total length:		79:46

All music is composed by Giacchino, unless otherwise noted.

VisionQuest – Vol. 2 (Episodes 5–8) [Original Soundtrack]
No.	Title	Writer(s)	Length
1.	"Trapped"		3:14
2.	"End to End Encryption"		1:16
3.	"Starlings"		2:21
4.	"Incarcerated"		2:49
5.	"Welcome to Madripoor"		1:43
6.	"Hardly Equipped"		1:22
7.	"Carrington That Weight"		3:34
8.	"Come On Out"		1:43
9.	"Palavan Hijack"		2:05
10.	"The Man Behind the Monitor"		4:19
11.	"Grief on Display"		1:23
12.	"Kiss from a Rose-Bot"		2:40
13.	"Cite Your Source Codes"		3:17
14.	"Portrait of a Synthetic Man on Fire"		3:16
15.	"20/20"		2:42
16.	"Family Ties"		5:29
17.	"Mind Your Manor"		3:05
18.	"A Psychic Hug"		2:22
19.	"All the King's Horses"		5:13
20.	"Rock 'Em Sock 'Em Synthezoids"		3:41
21.	"My Something"		7:21
22.	"Found Family"		5:26
23.	"VisionQuest End Credits"		2:37
24.	"The Vision"		4:39
25.	"Don't Kill the World" (featuring Jonathan Coulton)	Kristen Anderson-Lopez and Robert Lopez	2:14
Total length:			79:51

== Marketing ==
Footage from the series was included in a sizzle reel that was shown at Disney's upfront presentation in May 2025. Bettany and Winderbaum promoted the series during a Marvel Animation and Marvel Television panel at New York Comic Con 2025, where footage was shown. Mekishana Pierre and Nick Romano at Entertainment Weekly noted the "trippy setting" of a mansion in Vision's mind where he sees personifications of other AIs from the MCU, comparing this to the "reality-warping vibes" of WandaVision and Agatha All Along. The appearance of Spader as Ultron in both robot and human forms was also noted by commentators. Bettany and Matalas promoted the series during the 53rd Saturn Awards ceremony in March 2026, and Bettany appeared at Disney's May upfront presentation to announce the premiere date and show more footage.

At Disney's D23 convention in August 2026, a VisionQuest booth displayed a screen framed like a painting which showed a mysterious figure engulfed in flames. The image would glitch to show glimpses of Ultron. Commentators believed the fiery figure could be the original Human Torch. Also at the convention, Feige, Bettany, and Spader promoted the series during a panel and debuted the first trailer before it was released online. The trailer, which featured the song "Losing My Mind", was described as "trippy" by Kirsten Chuba and Aaron Couch at The Hollywood Reporter, "mind-bending" by James Hibbs for Radio Times, and "as weird, if not weirder, than WandaVision" by Michael McWhertor of Polygon.

A second trailer was released on October 1, 2026. Michael Walsh of Nerdist praised the trailer, calling it an "absolute banger" that presented VisionQuest as "surreal, mysterious, heartfelt, and funny", while also bringing "real stakes" for both the series' characters and the MCU as a whole. Bettany promoted the series at San Diego Comic-Con Málaga 2026 on October 3, where the first 22 minutes of the premiere episode were screened. Bettany further promoted VisionQuest alongside Spader, Mollica, Hampshire, and Matalas at New York Comic Con 2026 that same month, where the series' first episode was screened. Also part of that convention was an immersive pop-up exhibition titled "Controlled, Altered, Deleted: The VisionQuest Collection", which was on display at Studio 525 in New York on October 9 and 10. The exhibition featured parodies of famous paintings, such as Grant Wood's American Gothic (1930) and Hopper's Nighthawks (1942), among others. An episode of VisionQuest was screened at the SCAD Savannah Film Festival's third annual TV Sidebar on October 26—an event at which Bettany received the Virtuoso Award.

== Release ==
VisionQuest had its first two episodes screened at the 2026 BFI London Film Festival on October 12, ahead of their premiere on Disney+ on October 13; the series was originally scheduled to premiere on October 14. The remaining six episodes were released weekly in two-episode blocks, followed by the final two episodes releasing individually on November 3 and 10, respectively. It is a part of Phase Six of the MCU.

== Reception ==
=== Critical response ===
On review aggregator Rotten Tomatoes, 86% of 97 critics gave the season a positive review, and the average of rated reviews was 7.30 out of 10. The critics' consensus reads, "Picking up where WandaVision left off, this series investigates the humanity beneath the robot, where the artificial becomes reality with heart, deliberate emotion, and a clear-eyed VisionQuest." Metacritic, which uses a weighted average, assigned a score of 64 out of 100 based on 25 critics, indicating "generally favorable" reviews.

=== Viewership ===
Luminate, which gathers viewership data from some smart televisions in the United States, informed that VisionQuest generated 639 million minutes viewed during its first ten days of streaming. Nielsen Media Research, which measures streaming viewership on certain American television screens, reported that it ranked as the seventh most-streamed original series from October 19–25, with 490 million minutes viewed. The following week, from October 26 to November 1, it ranked sixth, with 548 million minutes of watch time. The finale of VisionQuest reached 3.7 million views globally in a single day of streaming, marking a 44% increase over the penultimate episode and becoming the most-watched season finale for an MCU television series in three years—since the second season of Loki (2023).

== Podcast ==
VisionQuest Official Podcast, a companion podcast episode for the series, was released on November 10, 2026. Hosted by Iman Vellani, who portrays Kamala Khan / Ms. Marvel in the MCU, and Frank Alvarez, it featured a conversation with Bettany, Spader, Mollica, and Matalas. The episode was released on Disney+ and YouTube, with an audio-only version available on various podcast platforms.

== Future ==
In September 2026, Matalas said he had ideas for how the story of VisionQuest could continue in future seasons, while Bettany said the series was introducing a "new type" of Vision and would be a "springboard" for the character's future MCU appearances. By November, there had been talks at Marvel Studios regarding the future of some of the characters from VisionQuest in the MCU.
