= Bunnytown =

2007 American children's television series

- Genre: Children's television series
- Created by: David Rudman; Adam Rudman; Todd Hannert
- Directed by: David Rudman
- Starring: Alice Dinnean-Vernon; Eric Jacobson; Mark Jefferis; Nigel Plaskitt; David Rudman; Victoria Willing; Mak Wilson
- Opening theme: Bunnytown
- Ending theme: It's a Bunnytown Life
- Composers: Todd Hannert; Terry Fryer
- Countries of origin: United States; United Kingdom
- Original language: English
- No. of seasons: 1
- No. of episodes: 26

Production
- Executive producers: David Rudman; Adam Rudman; Todd Hannert
- Production location: Elstree Studios
- Camera setup: Multi-camera
- Running time: 24 minutes
- Production companies: Baker Coogan Productions; Spiffy Pictures

Original release
- Network: Playhouse Disney
- Release: November 3, 2007 – November 8, 2008

Bunnytown is a children's television program produced as a co-production between Spiffy Pictures in the United States and Baker Coogan Productions in the United Kingdom for Playhouse Disney. It premiered in the United Kingdom on November 3, 2007 and in the United States on November 10, 2007. The series received generally positive reviews from critics.

== Format ==
The basic format features between ten and twelve segments as follows both from the show and short Interstitials aired on Disney Junior (now called Disney Jr.):

- A running gag setting up some sort of problem played out in four parts such as bunnies getting ready to race, drumming, etc. For example, the bunnies get ready for a race in the first episode "Hello Bunnies!" but they end up disco dancing in the first part (events with disco balls usually happen in the third part in most episodes), sleeping in the second, flying in the third and finally racing in the fourth part before the ending song but there is a tape at the finish line which flies them back to the start of the race, but they failed again.
- Red and Fred, a silent comedy-slapstick pratfall team in Peopletown made up of a fat ginger haired man and a smaller, thin dark haired male, played by Ed Gaughan and Andrew Buckley. This is done in the vein of Laurel and Hardy, who have the same style as Red and Fred. On the US broadcast, they are known as "Two Best Friends". Before this scene, a bunny named Bart Bunnytoes travels through an underground tunnel system to reach Peopletown, where he watches the events before leaving.
- The Adventures of Super-Bunny, created new for Bunnytown follows the format of Little Bad Bunny stealing carrots from Bunnytown, and Super-Bunny comes to the rescue.
- The Bunnytown Hop, done by a rock-and-roll band inspired by mega groups such as Earth, Wind and Fire. Characters from earlier segments may take part in this song.
- Super Silly Sports, also held in Peopletown, hosted by Pinky Pinkerton (portrayed by Scottish actress Polly Frame), best known for her wearing a pink Alice band in her blonde bouffant hairdo along with a matching neck scarf and sportsjacket over a white tennis dress, along with pink and white-striped above-the-knee socks. An example of this spoofing of sports contests and their telecasts within is a staring contest between an 11-year-old boy and an Idaho potato (because both of them have "eyes"). Pinky's signature exclamation is "Oh me, oh my!" done multiple times. Just like in the Red and Fred segments, Bart travels through the underground tunnels to watch the events.
- After the payoff of the running gag, all of the bunnies gather to sing the closing song "It's a Bunnytown Life", followed by a bunny blowing on a party horn.
- The Bunnytown segments Two Best Friends (Red and Fred) and Super Silly Sports were formerly shown in bumper segments on Disney Junior.

== Cast ==
The bunny rod puppets (which take up to eight puppeteers to operate with a trigger at the bottom to move their mouths and invisible marionette strings to work from above on all other parts) are made from foam rubber and covered in fake fur.

Characters include the many types of characters found in pop culture and storybooks. Included are a king and his court (supposedly the leaders of Bunnytown as they live in a castle), pirates, a superhero bunny, a female bunny who is an astronaut, two cave bunnies and their pet dinosaur, an inventor, a farmer and his helpers and many more.

=== Puppeteers ===
- Alice Dinnean-Vernon as Space Bunny, Dino, Edna, Teacher Bunny, Blue Pirate Bunny
- Eric Jacobson as Super Bunny, Melvin, Green Cave Bunny, Royal Assistant Marvin, Captain Dan
- Mark Jefferis as Professor DoodleBunny, Farmer Gramps
- Nigel Plaskitt as King Bunny, Little Bad Bunny, Green Bunny Pirate
- David Rudman as Yellow Cave Bunny, Hoppy Funtooth, Blue Bunny Musician
- Victoria Willing as Louise
- Mak Wilson as Jester Bunny

=== Live-action cast ===
- Andrew Buckley as Red
- Polly Frame as Pinky Pinkerton
- Ed Gaughan as Fred
- Keely Cat-Wells as Millie The Cheerleader
- Jami Reid-Quarrell as Spot
- Owen Mulhall as Chef flanders
- Alanis Peart as Smart Lady
- Ian Stacey as Fingers Frederico

== Episodes ==
No.	Title	Original release date	Prod. code	US viewers (millions)
1	"Hello Bunnies"	November 10, 2007	101	N/A
2	"Bunny Funnies"	November 11, 2007	102	N/A
Running Gag: Artistic Bunny trying to start painting an apple, but ends up with a worm going inside an apple as a spaceship in the first part, a fruit dancing bunny in the second; The Adventures of Super-Bunny: Bunnytown Carrot Festival
3	"Bunny Giggles"	November 17, 2007	103	N/A
4	"Barrel Full of Bunnies"	November 18, 2007	104	N/A
5	"Bunny Shenanigans"	November 24, 2007	105	N/A
6	"Wintertime In Bunnytown"	December 1, 2007	116	N/A
7	"Bunny Ha-Ha's"	December 8, 2007	106	N/A
8	"Hiya Bunnies"	December 15, 2007	108	N/A
9	"Bunny-A-Go-Go"	January 5, 2008	109	N/A
10	"G'Day Bunnies"	January 19, 2008	107	N/A
11	"Carrot Giving Day"	February 9, 2008	113	N/A
12	"Bonkers for Bunnies"	February 23, 2008	112	N/A
13	"Bunnytown Pets"	March 1, 2008	114	N/A
14	"Bunnytown Fun"	March 24, 2008	110	N/A
15	"King Bunny's Birthday"	March 25, 2008	115	N/A
16	"Those Wacky Bunnies"	March 26, 2008	117	N/A
17	"Bunny Blankie Blues"	March 27, 2008	118	N/A
18	"Bunnytown Follies"	March 28, 2008	111	N/A
19	"Bunnytown Babbles"	April 5, 2008	120	N/A
20	"Bumbling Bunnies"	May 24, 2008	121	N/A
21	"Bunnies Bunnies Bunnies"	June 21, 2008	119	N/A
22	"Groovy Bunnies"	July 5, 2008	122	N/A
23	"Bunny-A-Rama"	August 16, 2008	125	N/A
24	"What a Bunnytown Hoot"	September 27, 2008	124	N/A
25	"Bunnytown Chuckles"	October 18, 2008	123	N/A
26	"Get Fit, Bunnytown"	November 8, 2008	126	N/A

== Production ==
Bunnytown was created by David Rudman, his brother Adam, and Todd Hannert, under their Spiffy Pictures television production-channel company. The show was produced at Elstree Studios. The series was commissioned by Disney in an attempt to produce more shows outside the United States following the opening of their London-based Global Original Programming hub, but Bunnytown was commissioned before the creation of the hub.

== Release ==
=== Broadcast ===
Bunnytown first premiered in the United Kingdom on Playhouse Disney on November 3, 2007 and in Canada on the same day. It premiered in the United States on November 10, 2007. In France, it began airing on January 27, 2008, and kept its original title Bunnytown.

The series ran for one season, comprising twenty-six episodes, which concluded on November 8, 2008.

=== Home media ===
The show was released in DVD on March 17, 2009. The Bunnytown shorts were made available to stream on DisneyNow. Disney-ABC Television Group later released the series on Hulu.

== Reception ==
=== Critical response ===
Mike Hale of The New York Times wrote, "What you do get on screen is a fast-moving variety-show and sketch-comedy format that alternates elaborate silly jokes with musical numbers in which the bunnies grab guitars and crank out generic but bouncy R&B-inflected power pop. (If you had access to those press notes, you too could say, “Ah, they are trying to sound like Earth, Wind & Fire.”) It all seems sufficiently safe and diverting to serve as a surrogate baby sitter, while perhaps just strange enough to appeal to hung-over adult hipsters." Marilyn Moss of Associated Press described Bunnytown as "very colorful and fast-moving for the youngest set," writing, "Bunnytown is a musical bonanza for preschoolers. If the music is not original (its sound resembles the jingles of many other preschooler shows), that's not a problem for this venture. The animation is lively enough to overcome anything else." Emily Ashby of Common Sense Media gave Bunnytown a grade of three out of five stars and complimented the depiction of positive messages, asserting, "The energetic series promotes animation and exposes preschoolers to a range of musical styles, including disco, country, piano, and light opera. Lyrics or dialogue very occasionally include repetitive counting or other simple skills, but on the whole, entertainment outweighs educational content."

=== Accolades ===
Bunnytown was nominated for Outstanding Achievement in Art Direction/Set Decoration/Scenic Design at the 2008 Daytime Emmy Awards.
