= Mudtown =

2024 British-Welsh crime drama TV series

- Created by: Crime drama
- Screenplay by: Hannah Daniel; Georgia Lee
- Directed by: Rhys Carter; Chris Forster
- Starring: Erin Richards; Tom Cullen; Lauren Morais
- Country of origin: United Kingdom
- Original languages: English; Welsh
- No. of series: 1
- No. of episodes: 6

Production
- Executive producer: Ed Talfan
- Producer: Hannah Thomas
- Production company: Severn Screen

Original release
- Network: U&Alibi; S4C

Mudtown (Ar y Ffin) is a 2024 six-part British crime drama television series set in Wales and broadcast in Welsh on S4C and broadcast in English on U&Alibi, having been filmed back-to-back in both English and Welsh.

== Premise ==
A magistrate working in Newport, Wales, uncovers criminal activity that may be a risk to herself and her family.

== Cast ==
- Erin Richards as Clare Lewis Jones
- Tom Cullen as Peter 'Saint Pete' Burton
- Lauren Morais as Beca Lewis Jones
- Matthew Gravelle as Alun Lewis Jones
- Lloyd Meredith as Sonny Higgins
- Kimberley Nixon as Sara Humphries
- Sion Pritchard as Davey Johns
- Ifan Huw Dafydd as Owen Williams

== Production ==
The six-part series was commissioned by UKTV in April 2024, and is a co-commission with S4C and All3Media International. It is written by Hannah Daniel and magistrate Georgia Lee. The series is produced by Severn Screen with Ed Talfan as executive producer and Hannah Thomas series producer. It is directed by Rhys Carter and Chris Forster. The series was filmed back-to-back in both English and Welsh. Filming took place in Newport, Wales with Thomas saying the aim was to make the series feel "urban and authentic" and to show "Newport in a really unexpected light". The writers Lee and Daniel spent research time in the public gallery of Newport magistrates court.

The cast is led by Erin Richards, Lauren Morais and Tom Cullen, and also includes Kimberley Nixon and Matthew Gravelle.

== Broadcast ==
The series was first broadcast in Welsh on S4C in December 2024, with the English-language version on U&Alibi on 20 August 2025.

== Accolades ==
The series was nominated for Best Drama and Best Director at the BAFTA Cymru Awards in 2025.
