= Polly Frame =

Scottish actress

- Born: Edinburgh, Scotland
- Occupation: Actress

Polly Frame is a Scottish actress who was born in Edinburgh, Scotland and is best known to children as Pinky Pinkerton, the hyperactive sports announcer on Disney Channel's pre-school television series Bunnytown.

She moved to Galashiels as a child, then to London after spending a year backpacking through India. Among her TV shows and films are Meet the Magoons and Half Light. A graduate of Bristol University and its Old Vic Theatre, Frame appeared in a modernized version of William Shakespeare's Macbeth.

== Acting credits ==
=== Television ===
Year	Title	Role	Notes	Ref.
2007–2008	Bunnytown	Pinky Pinkerton		
2023	The Crown	Sally Morgan	Season 6	
2026	VisionQuest	Fiona Guthrie	Episode: "No Strings"	

=== Theatre ===
Year	Title	Role	Theatre	Director
2019	Solaris	Kris	Lyceum Theatre, Edinburgh	Matthew Lutton
