= Gonzalo López-Gallego =

Spanish film director (born 1973)

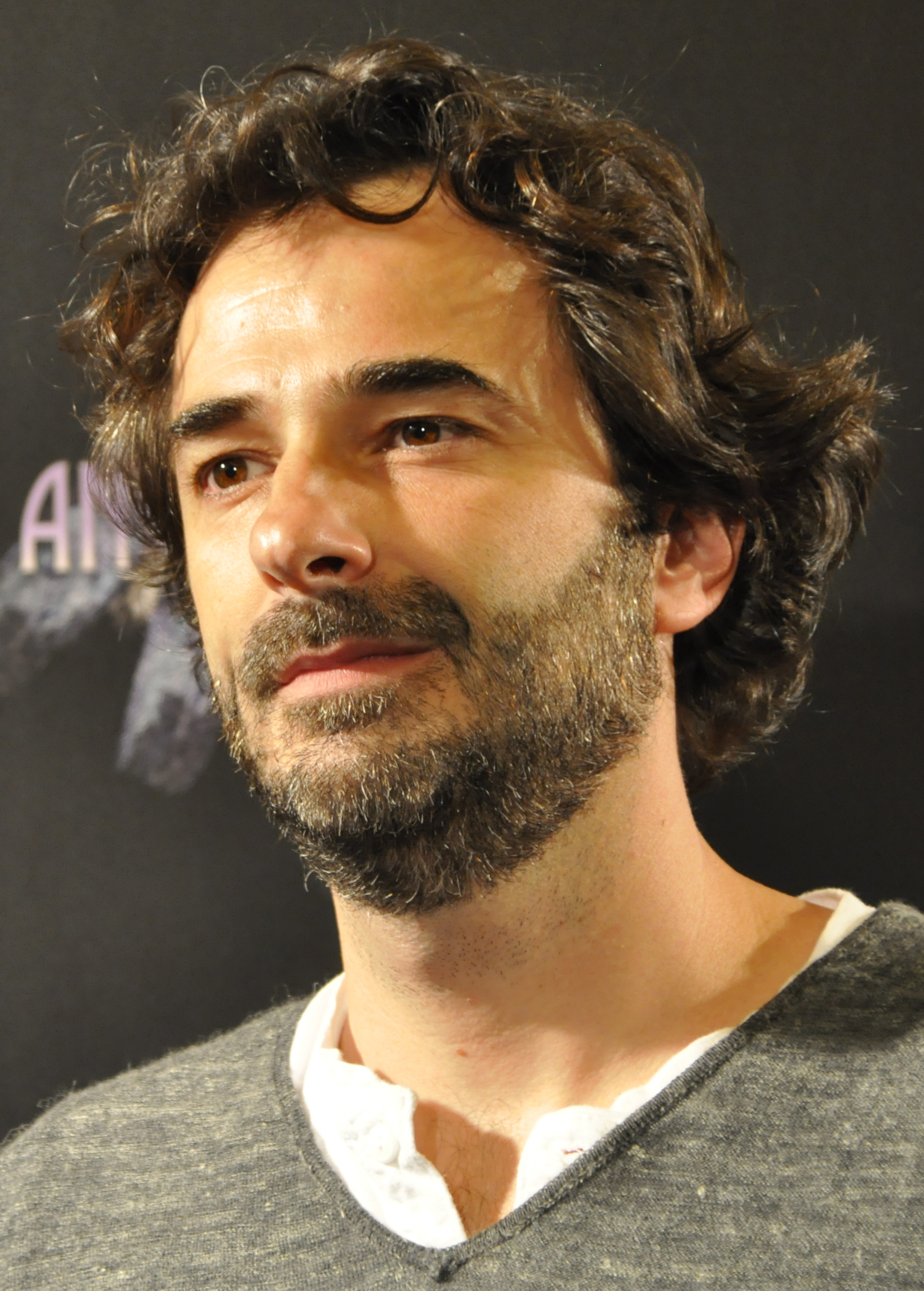
- Born: 27 June 1973 (age 52); Madrid, Spain
- Occupation: Film director
- Known for: Apollo 18

Gonzalo López-Gallego (born 27 June 1973) is a Spanish film director who is best known for his movie Apollo 18, a 2011 sci-fi thriller and horror film starring Warren Christie, Lloyd Owen, and Ryan Robbins.

== Filmography ==
- King of the Hill (El rey de la montaña) - 2007
- La piel azul - 2010
- Apollo 18 - 2011
- Open Grave - 2012
- The Hollow Point - 2016
- Backdraft 2 - 2019
- American Star - 2024
