= Keith Cowing =

American astrobiologist and NASA journalist

Keith Cowing is an American astrobiologist, former NASA employee, and the editor of the American space program blog NASA Watch. He is a credentialed NASA journalist and is known to be a critic of NASA activities and policies.

== NASA Watch ==
NASA Watch is a website blog which provides insider information and commentary about the United States space program and the U.S. government agency, NASA. The first posting was in March, 1996. Cowing is a strong supporter of human spaceflight. Cowing started the website when Daniel Goldin was administrator of NASA and at that time expressed harsh criticism of Goldin's policies. The inciting event for Keith was the mass layoffs in the transition from Space Station Freedom to the International Space Station. For several years, NASA refused to accredit Cowing as a journalist and denied him access to NASA media events. Cowing was eventually granted full press accreditation.

Cowing was a firm supporter of Goldin's successor as administrator, Sean O'Keefe, appointed by George W. Bush. Cowing also obtained exclusive first-hand information about the genesis of the Vision for Space Exploration, detailed in the book New Moon Rising which Cowing wrote with Frank Sietzen.

When Michael Griffin was NASA administrator, the relationship between NASA Watch and NASA seemed to have been a more confrontational one. Cowing, as well as other space program insiders, commented negatively about a return to Goldin-style management practices under Griffin. Cowing dubbed Monday, June 13, 2005 as Black Monday when many NASA personnel were sent reassignment letters.

== Publications ==
- Phillips, Robert W.; Cowing, Keith (1993). "Space Station Freedom: A Unique Laboratory for Gravitational Biology Research." (Article.) Transactions of the Kansas Academy of Science. Volume 96, no. 1/2, p. 80-86. OCLC Number: 480268661.
- Cowing, Keith (2002). Astrobiology has arrived. National Space Society. OCLC Number: 49716292
- Sietzen (Jr.), Frank; Cowing, Keith L. (January 14, 2004). "Beyond the Moon: Inside Bush's space plan (Part 1 of 3)." (Article.) Space Ref.
- Dick, Steven J.; Cowing, Keith; et al. (2005). Risk and exploration: earth, sea and the stars: NASA administrator's symposium, September 26-29, 2004, Naval Postgraduate School, Monterey, California. National Aeronautics and Space Administration (NASA). OCLC Number: 68963879
