= List of accolades received by Coco (2017 film) =

Coco accolades
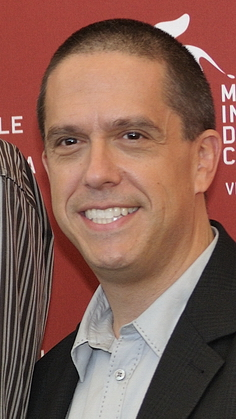
- Lee Unkrich received several awards and nominations for his direction.
Awards and nominations
Award	Wins	Nominations
Academy Awards	2	2
ACE Eddie Awards	1	1
Alliance of Women Film Journalists Awards	1	2
Annie Awards	11	13
African-American Film Critics Association	2	2
Art Directors Guild	1	1
Austin Film Critics Association	1	1
Boston Society of Film Critics	1	1
British Academy Film Awards	1	1
Cinema Audio Society Awards	1	1
Chicago Film Critics Association	1	1
Critics' Choice Movie Awards	2	2
Dallas–Fort Worth Film Critics Association	1	1
Detroit Film Critics Society	0	1
Empire Awards	1	1
Florida Film Critics Circle	1	1
Georgia Film Critics Association	2	2
Golden Globe Awards	1	2
Golden Reel Awards	1	2
Grammy Awards	0	2
Guild of Music Supervisors Awards	2	2
Heartland Film Festival	1	1
Hollywood Film Awards	1	1
Hollywood Music in Media Awards	1	1
Houston Film Critics Society	2	2
Humanitas Prize	0	1
Imagen Awards	2	2
International Film Music Critics Association	0	1
Kansas City Film Critics Circle Awards	1	1
Kids' Choice Awards	1	1
Los Angeles Film Critics Association	1	1
National Board of Review	1	1
New York Film Critics Circle	1	1
New York Film Critics Online	1	1
Online Film Critics Society	1	1
Producers Guild of America Award	1	1
San Diego Film Critics Society	0	1
San Francisco Film Critics Circle	1	1
Satellite Awards	1	2
Saturn Awards	2	2
Seattle Film Critics Society	1	1
St. Louis Film Critics Association	1	1
Teen Choice Awards	2	3
Toronto Film Critics Association	1	1
Visual Effects Society Awards	4	4
Washington D.C. Area Film Critics Association	2	4
Women Film Critics Circle Awards	2	2
World Soundtrack Awards	0	1

Totals (Note: Certain award groups do not simply award one winner. They acknowledge several different recipients, have runners-up, and have third place. Since this is a specific recognition and is different from losing an award, runner-up mentions are considered wins in this award tally. For simplification and to avoid errors, each award in this list has been presumed to have had a prior nomination.)
- Wins: 63
- Nominations: 81

Coco is a 2017 American animated fantasy comedy-drama film produced by Pixar Animation Studios and released by Walt Disney Pictures. The film was directed by Lee Unkrich and was based on an original idea by Unkrich with the screenplay written by Adrian Molina (who also co-directed) and Matthew Aldrich. The film follows Miguel (voiced by Anthony Gonzalez), a 12-year-old boy, who is accidentally transported to the land of the dead. There he seeks the help of his deceased musician great-great-grandfather to return him to his family among the living. The film's voice cast also stars Gael García Bernal, Benjamin Bratt, Alanna Ubach, Renée Victor, Ana Ofelia Murguía, and Edward James Olmos.

The film premiered at the Morelia International Film Festival on October 20, 2017. It was theatrically released in Mexico the following week, before being released in over 3,900 theatres in the United States and Canada on November 27. Coco grossed $814.3 million worldwide. On the review aggregator website Rotten Tomatoes, the film holds an approval rating of 97% based on 357 reviews.

Coco garnered awards and nominations in various categories with particular recognition for Michael Giacchino's score. At the 90th Academy Awards, it won Best Animated Feature and Best Original Song. The film garnered two nominations at the 75th Golden Globe Awards, winning for Best Animated Feature Film. Coco also won the BAFTA Award for Best Animated Film and the Critics' Choice Movie Award for both Best Animated Feature and Best Song. The film led the 45th Annie Awards with thirteen nominations, and won a record-breaking eleven awards. It was named one of the ten best films of 2017 by the National Board of Review. Various critic circles also picked Coco as the best animated feature film of the year.

== Accolades ==
Accolades received by Coco (2017 film)
Award	Date of ceremony	Category	Recipients	Result	Ref.
Academy Awards	March 4, 2018	Best Animated Feature	Lee Unkrich and Darla K. Anderson	Won	
Academy Awards	March 4, 2018	Best Original Song	Kristen Anderson-Lopez and Robert Lopez (for "Remember Me")	Won	
ACE Eddie Awards	January 26, 2018	Best Edited Animated Feature Film	Steve Bloom	Won	
Alliance of Women Film Journalists Awards	January 9, 2018	Best Animated Film	Coco	Won (Note: Tied with Loving Vincent)	
Alliance of Women Film Journalists Awards	January 9, 2018	Best Animated Female	Mama Imelda	Nominated	
Annie Awards	February 3, 2018	Best Animated Feature	Coco	Won	
Annie Awards	February 3, 2018	Animated Effects in an Animated Production	Shaun Galinak, Dave Hale, Jason Johnston, Carl Kaphan, Keith Daniel Klohn	Won	
Annie Awards	February 3, 2018	Character Animation in an Animated Feature Production	John Chun Chiu Lee	Won	
Annie Awards	February 3, 2018	Character Animation in an Animated Feature Production	Allison Rutland	Nominated	
Annie Awards	February 3, 2018	Character Design in an Animated Feature Production	Daniel Arriaga, Daniela Strijleva, Greg Dykstra, Alonso Martinez, Zaruhi Galstyan	Won	
Annie Awards	February 3, 2018	Directing in an Animated Feature Production	Lee Unkrich and Adrian Molina	Won	
Annie Awards	February 3, 2018	Music in an Animated Feature Production	Michael Giacchino, Kristen Anderson-Lopez, Robert Lopez, Germaine Franco, Adrian Molina	Won	
Annie Awards	February 3, 2018	Production Design in an Animated Feature Production	Harley Jessup, Danielle Feinberg, Bryn Imagire, Nathaniel McLaughlin, Ernesto Nemesio	Won	
Annie Awards	February 3, 2018	Storyboarding in an Animated Feature Production	Dean Kelly	Won	
Annie Awards	February 3, 2018	Storyboarding in an Animated Feature Production	Madeline Sharafian	Nominated	
Annie Awards	February 3, 2018	Voice Acting in an Animated Feature Production	Anthony Gonzalez	Won	
Annie Awards	February 3, 2018	Writing in an Animated Feature Production	Adrian Molina and Matthew Aldrich	Won	
Annie Awards	February 3, 2018	Editorial in an Animated Feature Production	Steve Bloom, Lee Unkrich, Greg Snyder, Tim Fox	Won	
African-American Film Critics Association	February 7, 2018	Best Animated Feature	Coco	Won	
African-American Film Critics Association	February 7, 2018	Top 10 Films	Coco	Won	
Art Directors Guild	January 27, 2018	Production Design in an Animated Feature	Harley Jessup	Won	
Austin Film Critics Association	January 8, 2018	Best Animated Film	Coco	Won	
Boston Society of Film Critics	December 10, 2017	Best Animated Film	Coco	Won	
British Academy Film Awards	February 18, 2018	Best Animated Film	Coco	Won	
Cinema Audio Society Awards	February 24, 2018	Outstanding Achievement in Sound Mixing for a Motion Picture – Animated	Vince Caro, Christopher Boyes, Michael Semanick, Joel Iwataki and Blake Collins	Won	
Chicago Film Critics Association	December 12, 2017	Best Animated Film	Coco	Won	
Critics' Choice Movie Awards	January 11, 2018	Best Animated Feature	Coco	Won	
Critics' Choice Movie Awards	January 11, 2018	Best Song	"Remember Me"	Won	
Dallas–Fort Worth Film Critics Association	December 13, 2017	Best Animated Film	Coco	Won	
Detroit Film Critics Society	December 7, 2017	Best Animated Film	Coco	Nominated	
Empire Awards	March 18, 2018	Best Animated Film	Coco	Won	
Florida Film Critics Circle	December 23, 2017	Best Animated Film	Coco	Won	
Georgia Film Critics Association	January 12, 2018	Best Animated Film	Coco	Won	
Georgia Film Critics Association	January 12, 2018	Best Original Song	"Remember Me"	Won	
Golden Globe Awards	January 7, 2018	Best Animated Feature Film	Coco	Won	
Golden Globe Awards	January 7, 2018	Best Original Song	Kristen Anderson-Lopez and Robert Lopez (for the song "Remember Me")	Nominated	
Golden Reel Awards	February 18, 2018	Outstanding Achievement in Sound Editing – Feature Animation	J.R. Grubbs, Chris Boyes, Marshall Winn, Michael Silvers, Michael Silvers, Justin Doyle, Jack Whittaker, Terry Eckton, Dee Selby, Jana Vance, Dennie Thorpe, Geoff Vaughan	Won	
Golden Reel Awards	February 18, 2018	Outstanding Achievement in Sound Editing – Musical	Stephen Davis and Warren Brown	Nominated	
Grammy Awards	February 10, 2019	Best Song Written for Visual Media	Kristen Anderson-Lopez and Robert Lopez for "Remember Me"	Nominated	
Grammy Awards	February 10, 2019	Best Score Soundtrack for Visual Media	Michael Giacchino	Nominated	
Guild of Music Supervisors Awards	February 8, 2018	Best Music Supervision for Film: Budgeted Over 25 Million Dollars	Tom MacDougall	Nominated	
Guild of Music Supervisors Awards	February 8, 2018	Best Song/Recording Created for a Film	"Remember Me"	Nominated	
Heartland Film Festival	November 23, 2017	Truly Moving Picture Award	Lee Unkrich	Won	
Hollywood Film Awards	November 5, 2017	Hollywood Animation Award	Lee Unkrich and Darla K. Anderson	Won	
Hollywood Music in Media Awards	November 16, 2017	Best Original Score – Animated Film	Michael Giacchino	Won	
Houston Film Critics Society	January 6, 2018	Best Animated Film	Coco	Won	
Houston Film Critics Society	January 6, 2018	Best Original Song	"Remember Me"	Won	
Humanitas Prize	February 16, 2018	Feature – Family	Lee Unkrich, Jason Katz, Matthew Aldrich and Adrian Molina	Nominated	
Imagen Awards	August 25, 2018	Best Picture	Coco	Won	
Imagen Awards	August 25, 2018	Best Director	Lee Unkrich and Adrian Molina	Won	
International Film Music Critics Association	February 22, 2018	Best Original Score for an Animated Film	Michael Giacchino	Nominated	
Kansas City Film Critics Circle Awards	{December 17, 2017	Best Animated Feature	Coco	Won	
Kids' Choice Awards	March 24, 2018	Favorite Animated Movie	Coco	Won	
Los Angeles Film Critics Association	December 3, 2017	Best Animated Film	Coco	Runner-up	
National Board of Review	January 9, 2018	Best Animated Film	Coco	Won	
New York Film Critics Circle	January 3, 2018	Best Animated Film	Coco	Won	
New York Film Critics Online	December 10, 2017	Best Animated Film	Coco	Won	
Online Film Critics Society	December 28, 2017	Best Animated Feature	Coco	Won	
Producers Guild of America Awards	January 20, 2018	Best Animated Motion Picture	Darla K. Anderson	Won	
San Diego Film Critics Society	December 11, 2017	Best Animated Film	Coco	Nominated	
San Francisco Film Critics Circle	December 10, 2017	Best Animated Feature	Coco	Won	
Satellite Awards	February 11, 2018	Best Animated or Mixed Media Feature	Coco	Won	
Satellite Awards	February 11, 2018	Best Sound (Editing and Mixing)	Coco	Nominated	
Saturn Awards	June 27, 2018	Best Animated Film	Coco	Won	
Saturn Awards	June 27, 2018	Best Music	Michael Giacchino	Won	
Seattle Film Critics Society	December 18, 2017	Best Animated Feature	Coco	Won	
St. Louis Film Critics Association	December 17, 2017	Best Animated Feature	Coco	Won	
Teen Choice Awards	August 12, 2018	Choice Fantasy Movie	Coco	Won	
Teen Choice Awards	August 12, 2018	Choice Fantasy Movie Actor	Anthony Gonzalez	Won	
Teen Choice Awards	August 12, 2018	Choice Fantasy Movie Actor	Gael García Bernal	Nominated	
Toronto Film Critics Association	December 10, 2017	Best Animated Film	Coco	Runner-up	
Visual Effects Society Awards	February 13, 2018	Outstanding Visual Effects in an Animated Feature	Lee Unkrich, Darla K. Anderson, David Ryu, Michael K. O'Brien	Won	
Visual Effects Society Awards	February 13, 2018	Outstanding Animated Character in an Animated Feature	Emron Grover, Jonathan Hoffman, Michael Honsel, Guilherme Sauerbronn Jacinto for "Hèctor"	Won	
Visual Effects Society Awards	February 13, 2018	Outstanding Created Environment in an Animated Feature	Michael Frederickson, Jamie Hecker, Jonathan Pytko, Dave Strick for "City of the Dead"	Won	
Visual Effects Society Awards	February 13, 2018	Outstanding Effects Simulations in an Animated Feature	Kristopher Campbell, Stephen Gustafson, Dave Hale, Keith Klohn	Won	
Washington D.C. Area Film Critics Association	December 8, 2017	Best Animated Feature	Coco	Won	
Washington D.C. Area Film Critics Association	December 8, 2017	Best Animated Voice Performance	Anthony Gonzalez	Won	
Washington D.C. Area Film Critics Association	December 8, 2017	Best Animated Voice Performance	Gael García Bernal	Nominated	
Washington D.C. Area Film Critics Association	December 8, 2017	Best Original Score	Michael Giacchino	Nominated	
Women Film Critics Circle Awards	December 22, 2017	Best Family Film	Coco	Won	
Women Film Critics Circle Awards	December 22, 2017	Best Animated Female(s)	Coco	Won	
World Soundtrack Awards	October 17, 2018	Best Original Song Written Directly for a Film	"Remember Me"	Nominated	
