= List of awards and nominations received by Robert Lopez =

List of Robert Lopez awards
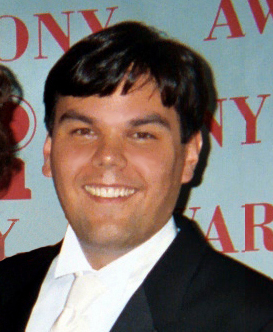
- Lopez at 2004 Tony Awards
Award	Wins	Nominations
Academy Awards	2	3
Emmy Awards	4	9
Grammy Awards	3	8
Tony Awards	3	4

Robert Lopez is an American songwriter for musicals for the stage and screen.

He is best known for co-creating The Book of Mormon and Avenue Q, and for co-writing the songs featured in the Disney computer-animated films Frozen, its sequel, Frozen II, and Coco, with his wife Kristen Anderson-Lopez. Of only 22 people who have won an Emmy, a Grammy, an Oscar and a Tony Award (nicknamed by Philip Michael Thomas in 1984 as the "EGOT"), he is the youngest (at 39 years and 8 days old) to win all four, and is the only person to have won all four awards more than once—Emmy (4), Grammy (3), Oscar (2) and Tony (3).

== EGOT Awards ==
=== Academy Awards ===
Year	Category	Nominated work	Result	Ref.
2013	Best Original Song	"Let It Go" (from Frozen)	Won	
2017	Best Original Song	"Remember Me" (from Coco)	Won	
2019	Best Original Song	"Into the Unknown" (from Frozen 2)	Nominated	

=== Emmy Awards ===
Primetime Emmy Awards
Year	Category	Nominated work	Result	Ref.
2007	Outstanding Original Music and Lyrics	"Everything Comes Down to Poo" (from Scrubs) (Episode: "My Musical")	Nominated	
2015	Outstanding Original Music and Lyrics	"Kiss an Old Man" (from The Comedians) (Episode: "Celebrity Guest")	Nominated	
2015	Outstanding Original Music and Lyrics	"Moving Pictures" (from The Oscars)	Nominated	
2021	Outstanding Original Main Title Theme Music	WandaVision	Nominated	
2021	Outstanding Original Music and Lyrics	"Agatha All Along" (from WandaVision) (Episode: "Breaking the Fourth Wall")	Won	
2025	Outstanding Original Music and Lyrics	"The Ballad of the Witches' Road" (from Agatha All Along) (Episode: "Circle Sewn with Fate / Unlock Thy Hidden Gate")	Nominated	
Daytime Emmy Awards
2008	Outstanding Music Direction and Composition	Wonder Pets!	Won	
2010	Outstanding Music Direction and Composition	Wonder Pets!	Won	
Children's and Family Emmy Awards
2022	Outstanding Short Form Program	We the People	Won	

=== Grammy Awards ===
Year	Category	Nominated work	Result	Ref.
2004	Best Musical Show Album	Avenue Q	Nominated	
2011	Best Musical Theater Album	The Book of Mormon: Original Broadway Cast Recording	Won	
2014	Best Compilation Soundtrack for Visual Media	Frozen	Won	
2014	Best Song Written for Visual Media	"Let It Go" (from Frozen)	Won	
2018	Best Song Written for Visual Media	"Remember Me" (from Coco)	Nominated	
2020	Best Compilation Soundtrack for Visual Media	Frozen 2	Nominated	
2020	Best Song Written for Visual Media	"Into the Unknown" (from Frozen 2)	Nominated	
2021	Best Song Written for Visual Media	"Agatha All Along" (from WandaVision)	Nominated	

=== Tony Awards ===
Year	Category	Nominated work	Result	Ref.
2004	Best Original Score	Avenue Q	Won	
2011	Best Book of a Musical	The Book of Mormon	Won	
2011	Best Original Score	The Book of Mormon	Won	
2018	Best Original Score	Frozen	Nominated	

== Industry awards ==
=== Annie Awards ===
Year	Category	Nominated work	Result	Ref.
2011	Music in a Feature Production	Winnie the Pooh	Nominated	
2013	Outstanding Achievement for Music in a Feature Production	Frozen	Won	
2017	Outstanding Achievement for Music in a Feature Production	Coco	Won	
2019	Outstanding Achievement for Music in a Feature Production	Frozen 2	Nominated	

=== Critics' Choice Movie Awards ===
Year	Category	Nominated work	Result	Ref.
2013	Best Original Song	"Let It Go" (from Frozen)	Won	
2017	Best Original Song	"Remember Me" (from Coco)	Won	
2019	Best Original Song	"Into the Unknown" (from Frozen 2)	Nominated	

=== Drama Desk Awards ===
Year	Category	Nominated work	Result	Ref.
2003	Outstanding Lyrics	Avenue Q	Nominated	
2003	Outstanding Music	Avenue Q	Nominated	
2011	Outstanding Lyrics	The Book of Mormon	Won	
2011	Outstanding Music	The Book of Mormon	Won	
2011	Outstanding Book of a Musical	The Book of Mormon	Nominated	

=== Golden Globe Awards ===
Year	Category	Nominated work	Result	Ref.
2013	Best Original Song	"Let It Go" (from Frozen)	Nominated	
2017	Best Original Song	"Remember Me" (from Coco)	Nominated	
2019	Best Original Song	"Into the Unknown" (from Frozen 2)	Nominated	

== See also ==
- EGOT
