= Los Diablos! =

- Shameless episode
- Episode no.: Season 9 Episode 10
- Directed by: Roberto Sneider
- Written by: Nancy M. Pimental
- Cinematography by: Anthony Hardwick
- Editing by: Michael S. Stern
- Original release date: February 10, 2019
- Running time: 58 minutes

Guest appearances
- Katey Sagal as Ingrid Jones (special guest star); Luis Guzmán as Mikey O'Shea (special guest star); Sharon Lawrence as Margo Mierzejewski; Paton Ashbrook as Ryan; Andy Buckley as Randy; Nancy Linehan Charles as Broom Hilda; Sarah Colonna as Lori; Rebecca Field as Eliza; Jess Gabor as Kelly Keefe; Amirah Johnson as Alexandra "Xan" Galvez; Kate Miner as Tami Tamietti; Joy Osmanski as Dr. Kwan; Zach Villa as Dax; Ellen Wroe as Clancy; Jim Hoffmaster as Kermit; Michael Patrick McGill as Tommy; Reyna Calvillo as Martina; Stephanie Charles as Tyesha; Anthony Gonzalez as Santiago

Episode chronology
← Previous "BOOOOOOOOOOOONE!"	Next → "The Hobo Games"
- Shameless season 9

"Los Diablos!" is the tenth episode of the ninth season of the American television comedy drama Shameless, an adaptation of the British series of the same name. It is the 106th overall episode of the series and was written by executive producer Nancy M. Pimental, and directed by Roberto Sneider. It originally aired on Showtime on February 10, 2019.

The series is set on the South Side of Chicago, Illinois, and depicts the poor, dysfunctional family of Frank Gallagher, a neglectful single father of six: Fiona, Phillip, Ian, Debbie, Carl, and Liam. He spends his days drunk, high, or in search of money, while his children need to learn to take care of themselves. In the episode, Fiona continues falling as she faces more consequences for her actions. Meanwhile, Frank competes in a local championship, while Lip is surprised when Xan returns.

According to Nielsen Media Research, the episode was seen by an estimated 1.14 million household viewers and gained a 0.40 ratings share among adults aged 18–49. The episode received mixed reviews from critics; while critics praised Fiona's descent, others criticized the execution and lack of character development.

== Plot ==
Past midnight, Fiona (Emmy Rossum) stays at Patsy's, counting the money while drinking alcohol. When she returns to the cash register, she finds three men awaiting her. The men turn intimidating, but are forced to leave when the cook shows up with a knife. Terrified of leaving, Fiona sleeps at Patsy's.

Frank (William H. Macy) competes for the Hobo Loco beverage spokesperson position, where he will face many other competitors who have to prove they can live in poor conditions. As he enrolls, he befriends one of the competitors, Mikey O'Shea (Luis Guzmán). Frank and Mikey turn aggressive towards the other; Mikey steals Frank's supplies for his bed, while Frank steals Mikey's retrieved food and locks him in a dumpster. Carl (Ethan Cutkosky) starts working as a sign spinner as a restaurant, but is assaulted by past gangster rivals. He considers quitting his job, until his boss claims he helped drive attendance by 20%.

When her co-workers find her asleep after failing to open the restaurant in time, Fiona decides to turn her life around. After taking a shower, she gives up alcohol and returns to work, determined to prioritize her life. Margo (Sharon Lawrence) visits Fiona, telling her that she has received complaints about her erratic behavior, to the point that the police was involved. Fiona promises that she has changed, but Margo surprises by firing her. She returns home, binge drinking again. Debbie (Emma Kenney) is forced to descend to the crawl space to get rid of termites, but accidentally causes a gas leak. Kelly (Jess Gabor) helps her out, and Debbie becomes smitten with her. Liam (Christian Isaiah), desperate for money, decides to make a lemonade stand outside a house. He earns money, but the house's racist owner forces him to close it.

Kevin (Steve Howey) and Veronica (Shanola Hampton) are astonished when Amy and Gemma punch Santiago (Anthony Gonzalez). They try to rebuild their family, but Santiago's sister picks him up, and both leave back for Guatemala. After spending the day together, Lip (Jeremy Allen White) and Tami (Kate Miner) return home, and discover Xan (Amirah Johnson) at the door, after Mercy abandoned her again. Lip accepts to take care of her again. After learning of the racist owner, Fiona enlists her family and neighbors to harass the owner outside her house. Fiona then punches the owner in the face, when the police arrives. She tries to flee, but is arrested shortly. As Fiona is escorted away, the crowd cheers as her family watch on in shock.

== Production ==
=== Development ===
The episode was written by executive producer Nancy M. Pimental, and directed by Roberto Sneider. It was Pimental's 22nd writing credit, and Sneider's first directing credit.

== Reception ==
=== Viewers ===
In its original American broadcast, "Los Diablos!" was seen by an estimated 1.14 million household viewers with a 0.40 in the 18–49 demographics. This means that 0.40 percent of all households with televisions watched the episode. This was a 35% increase in viewership from the previous episode, which was seen by an estimated 0.84 million household viewers with a 0.30 in the 18–49 demographics.

=== Critical reviews ===
"Los Diablos!" received mixed reviews from critics. Myles McNutt of The A.V. Club gave the episode a "C" grade and wrote, "For better or for worse — just kidding, it's obviously for worse — the rest of the ninth season has been transformed into a litmus test for whether Shameless has earned this future. And “Los Diablos!” is crippled by those expectations, another inert outing that fails to offer any meaningful story engine to drive interest in these characters."

Derek Lawrence of Entertainment Weekly wrote "With every episode, we get closer to Emmy Rossum's Shameless departure, and with every episode, I assume things will finally turn around for Fiona, setting the table for a happy goodbye. Well, we're still waiting as Fiona's spiral only worsens when she's fired and eventually arrested. Here's to hoping that she won't get the same sendoff as Ian." David Crow of Den of Geek gave the episode a 4 star rating out of 5 and wrote "That landing of gallows humor mixed with actual trips to the metaphorical gallows for Fiona made tonight the best episode we've had among 2019's early batch. It portends bad things to come, but it's good to know that that's where Shameless thrives."

Kimberly Ricci of Uproxx wrote "this week’s “Los Diablos!” installment lightens matters up a lot. Even though Fiona gets arrested by episode's end, the sheer chaotic nature of the episode's last 10 minutes makes up for the depressing tone we've witnessed for the past month of the long-running Showtime series." Christopher Dodson of Show Snob wrote "In a week of light hearted Hobo Wars and the inevitable doom of Fiona's downfall, Xan's story line was the most pivotal and touching. Well, except that right cross that Fiona used to touch up the new lemonade stand hating neighbor. Fiona's going down faster mentally than that neighbor did physically."

Jade Budowski of Decider wrote "As of now, Emmy Rossum is still set to depart after this season, so this continuing shitshow of Fiona's life these last few episodes doesn't seem to stand any chance of redeeming itself – and it only gets worse during this week's installment, “Los Diablos!”." Paul Dailly of TV Fanatic gave the episode a 4 star rating out of 5, and wrote, ""Los Diablos!" felt like the Shameless we know and love. It's slowly getting back to the creative footing it was on a few years ago."
