= BOOOOOOOOOOOONE! =

- Shameless episode
- Episode no.: Season 9 Episode 9
- Directed by: Loren Yaconelli
- Written by: Philip Buiser
- Cinematography by: Anthony Hardwick
- Editing by: Mark Strand
- Original release date: January 27, 2019
- Running time: 56 minutes

Guest appearances
- Katey Sagal as Ingrid Jones (special guest star); Paton Ashbrook as Ryan; Scott Michael Campbell as Brad; Patrick Davis Alarcón as Jason; Mustafa Elzein as Rob; Rebecca Field as Eliza; Jess Gabor as Kelly Keefe; Maddie McCormick as Corey Tamietti; Kate Miner as Tami Tamietti; Judith Moreland as Jolene; Anton Narinskiy as Boone; Joy Osmanski as Dr. Kwan; Zach Villa as Dax; Jim Hoffmaster as Kermit; Michael Patrick McGill as Tommy; Adilah Barnes as Rhonda; Anthony Gonzalez as Santiago

Episode chronology
← Previous "The Apple Doesn't Fall Far from the Alibi"	Next → "Los Diablos!"
- Shameless season 9

"BOOOOOOOOOOOONE!" is the ninth episode of the ninth season of the American television comedy drama Shameless, an adaptation of the British series of the same name. It is the 105th overall episode of the series and was written by producer Philip Buiser, and directed by Loren Yaconelli. It originally aired on Showtime on January 27, 2019.

The series is set on the South Side of Chicago, Illinois, and depicts the poor, dysfunctional family of Frank Gallagher, a neglectful single father of six: Fiona, Phillip, Ian, Debbie, Carl, and Liam. He spends his days drunk, high, or in search of money, while his children need to learn to take care of themselves. In the episode, Debbie becomes the head of the house, enforcing strict rules. Meanwhile, Frank tries to find ways to financially support his new family, while Kevin and Veronica try to reunite Santiago with his uncle.

According to Nielsen Media Research, the episode was seen by an estimated 0.84 million household viewers and gained a 0.30 ratings share among adults aged 18–49. The episode received mixed reviews from critics, who criticized the under-developed stories.

== Plot ==
Fed up with Fiona (Emmy Rossum) not taking responsibility for the finances, Debbie (Emma Kenney) decides to become the head of the Gallagher household. She forces the siblings to pay their due money, or she forbids them from using the shower and even changes the locks to prevent them from entering.

To cheer Santiago (Anthony Gonzalez) up, Kevin (Steve Howey) and Veronica (Shanola Hampton) travel to Indiana to locate his uncle and reunite them. They locate him at a restaurant, and as they ask for him, they accidentally reveal he is an illegal immigrant, unaware that a cop is behind them. The uncle tries to flee, but is arrested by the police. Despite being warned by the doctors of possible health risks, Ingrid (Katey Sagal) chooses to be pregnant with sextuplets, shocking Frank (William H. Macy). While Frank claims he is ready to support his new family, his children do not think the same. As he looks for ways to find job, he is approached by a team that wants him to take the title of "Hobo King" for an incoming experiment, and he accepts after being promised money.

Despite his young age, Liam (Christian Isaiah) is forced to contribute to the Squirrel Fund. He teams up with Santiago on a scheme to earn money by having Santiago lift A/Cs. Carl (Ethan Cutkosky) is scolded by Kelly's father, who opposes to their relationship. Carl convinces her father that he has grown as a person, while Kelly (Jess Gabor) makes it clear she will continue seeing Carl. At Patsy's, Lip (Jeremy Allen White) sees Tami (Kate Miner) being kissed by Boone (Anton Narinskiy), her soldier ex-boyfriend who is visiting to pay respects to her late mother's memorial. In an attempt to make her jealous, Lip sleeps with Tami's sister, Corey (Maddie McCormick).

Ford (Richard Flood) shows up at the Gallagher household for his tools, but Fiona angrily kicks him out. When he later shows up at Patsy's again, Fiona angrily lashes at him in front of the customers. To ease her tension, she attends boxing lessons. Her coach flirts with her, but Fiona rejects his advances. That night, a drunk Fiona throws the tools on Ford's house, shattering his windows. Lip talks with Tami, confessing to his actions. However, she is not angry; she is actually content that they finally get to understand their own problems, and aim to fix them.

== Production ==
=== Development ===
The episode was written by producer Philip Buiser, and directed by Loren Yaconelli. It was Buiser's second writing credit, and Yaconelli's first directing credit.

== Reception ==
=== Viewers ===
In its original American broadcast, "BOOOOOOOOOOOONE!" was seen by an estimated 0.84 million household viewers with a 0.30 in the 18–49 demographics. This means that 0.30 percent of all households with televisions watched the episode. This was a slight increase in viewership from the previous episode, which was seen by an estimated 0.80 million household viewers with a 0.26 in the 18–49 demographics.

=== Critical reviews ===
"BOOOOOOOOOOOONE!" received mixed reviews from critics. Myles McNutt of The A.V. Club gave the episode a "C" grade and wrote, "This is a better episode than last week's return, with some semblance of structure, but it continues to reinforce that Shameless has become a television show incapable of articulating why we should be invested in its future."

Derek Lawrence of Entertainment Weekly wrote "Over nine seasons, Shameless has never been afraid to mock/satirize political and social issues. Hell, just this season they already touched on the #MeToo movement and the election process. And now, via little Liam and poor Santiago, it's time to touch on the border wall, by building a border wall." David Crow of Den of Geek gave the episode a 3.5 star rating out of 5 and wrote "There is very little here we haven't seen before, but this week, I enjoyed spending time with these crazy kids. May this summer never really end."

Kimberly Ricci of Uproxx wrote "Man, I thought that the drunk Fiona storyline would be a lot more enjoyable that it's turning out to be. The series is actually getting pretty damn dark. Although every Gallagher family member is embroiled within drama, only three dynamics within this episode are worth discussing." Christopher Dodson of Show Snob wrote "This week's Shameless was full of lessons of not taking any crap, or any losses, from family, friends, or strangers."

Jade Budowski of Decider wrote "With Emmy Rossum's departure from Shameless imminent, Shameless's future feels pretty up in the air. This week's installment, “BOOOOOOOOOOOONE!”, leans into that uncertainty and runs with it, leaving us scratching our heads and wondering if there's even reason to care about what happens in half (or more?) of these stories anyway." Paul Dailly of TV Fanatic gave the episode a 3.5 star rating out of 5, and wrote, ""BOOOOOOOOOOOONE!" was a big step-up in quality, but the show is still lacking the spark that made it one of the best shows on TV."
