= The Hobo Games =

- Shameless episode
- Episode no.: Season 9 Episode 11
- Directed by: Iain B. MacDonald
- Written by: Molly Smith Metzler
- Cinematography by: Anthony Hardwick
- Editing by: Mark Strand
- Original release date: February 17, 2019
- Running time: 58 minutes

Guest appearances
- Katey Sagal as Ingrid Jones (special guest star); Luis Guzmán as Mikey O'Shea (special guest star); Paton Ashbrook as Ryan; Sharif Atkins as Peter Naylor; Andy Buckley as Randy; Scott Michael Campbell as Brad; Sarah Colonna as Lori; Patrick Davis Alarcón as Jason; Jess Gabor as Kelly Keefe; Amirah Johnson as Alexandra "Xan" Galvez; Kate Miner as Tami Tamietti; Zach Villa as Dax; Jim Hoffmaster as Kermit; Michael Patrick McGill as Tommy; Eddie Alfano as K.J.; Jerome Ro Brooks as Emiliano; Patrick Cox as Rory; Sonya Leslie as Keandra

Episode chronology
← Previous "Los Diablos!"	Next → "You'll Know the Bottom When You Hit It"
- Shameless season 9

"The Hobo Games" is the eleventh episode of the ninth season of the American television comedy drama Shameless, an adaptation of the British series of the same name. It is the 107th overall episode of the series and was written by Molly Smith Metzler, and directed by co-executive producer Iain B. MacDonald. It originally aired on Showtime on February 17, 2019. This episode premiered on Jeremy Allen White's 28th birthday.

The series is set on the South Side of Chicago, Illinois, and depicts the poor, dysfunctional family of Frank Gallagher, a neglectful single father of six: Fiona, Phillip, Ian, Debbie, Carl, and Liam. He spends his days drunk, high, or in search of money, while his children need to learn to take care of themselves. In the episode, Lip tries to become Xan's legal guardian, while Fiona ruins one of Lip's prospects. Meanwhile, Frank competes in the final game in the Hobo Games, while Carl suspects Debbie is trying to steal his girlfriend.

According to Nielsen Media Research, the episode was seen by an estimated 0.97 million household viewers and gained a 0.32 ratings share among adults aged 18–49. The episode received mixed reviews from critics; they praised the performances and ending, although many questioned if the series would actually move forward with Fiona's storyline.

== Plot ==
One week after her arrest, Fiona (Emmy Rossum) has been bailed out and is set to attend a hearing soon as she faces charges. Nevertheless, she continues her downward spiral by stealing oxycodone from a party she attended the prior night.

Frank (William H. Macy) and Mikey (Luis Guzmán) help each other during the final Hobo Games, including kissing to beg for money, and cutting themselves to get quick ER attention. They reach the final game, although Ingrid (Katey Sagal) is concerned that Frank might not prioritize her and the babies. Debbie (Emma Kenney) and Kelly (Jess Gabor) suggests a test; lying that she might be dying and see his reaction. Debbie and Kelly continue growing closer, but Carl (Ethan Cutkosky) starts to believe a relationship may begin. He tells Debbie to stop, but she claims nothing is happening.

Lip (Jeremy Allen White) begins applying DCFS papers so he can legally adopt Xan (Amirah Johnson). An agent, Peter Naylor (Sharif Atkins), is sent to the house for a surprise inspection. Lip is absent, so a drunk Fiona gives him a tour. Naylor concludes it is unsuitable for Xan, and walks off just as Lip arrives. Veronica (Shanola Hampton) declares she does not want children, and asks Kevin (Steve Howey) for a vasectomy. Kevin accepts and goes to the clinic, but lies that he got it. He fakes his condition, and so he is left home alone while Veronica works at the Alibi and the girls are placed under Debbie's care. However, Veronica discovers his deception after the doctor calls her, and makes him reschedule it.

Frank and Mikey prepare for the final game; they must reach a freight train and hop on it before it hits the finish line, while taking four shots of Hobo Loco beverage. Before it starts, Ingrid approaches Frank, telling her she feels pain and needs his help. After hesitating, Frank decides to continue the game, promising her he will join her soon, but she is disappointed when her fears are confirmed. Fiona visits the shop to apologize to Lip, and meets his sponsee Jason (Patrick Davis Alarcón), who is celebrating 100 days of sobriety. Fiona starts drinking vodka as she relates her problems, unaware of his status. Tempted, Jason relapses by drinking and subsequently returning to using drugs.

Lip becomes agitated by Xan's news, and tries to contact Tami (Kate Miner), but she does not respond his phone calls. He reaches her apartment and questions her; she reveals that she is pregnant with his child. She leaves before they can talk more about the baby, and Jason calls Lip to tell him about his actions. Lip consoles him, but is shaken when Jason reveals Fiona gave him the alcohol. Frank returns home and sees that Ingrid has chosen to go back with Randy (Andy Buckley), realizing Frank does not prioritize her, she also reveals that she has reduced the embryos to just two. Randy then gets Frank to sign a paper to not pursue parental rights, paying him $10,000. Lip confronts Fiona for her actions, noting that she does not take responsibility. An irate Lip then kicks her out of the house; Fiona laughs at the idea, but her expression changes to regret.

== Production ==
=== Development ===
The episode was written by Molly Smith Metzler, and directed by co-executive producer Iain B. MacDonald. It was Smith Metzler's fourth writing credit, and MacDonald's ninth directing credit.

== Reception ==
=== Viewers ===
In its original American broadcast, "The Hobo Games" was seen by an estimated 0.97 million household viewers with a 0.32 in the 18–49 demographics. This means that 0.32 percent of all households with televisions watched the episode. This was a 15% decrease in viewership from the previous episode, which was seen by an estimated 1.14 million household viewers with a 0.40 in the 18–49 demographics.

=== Critical reviews ===
"The Hobo Games" received mixed reviews from critics. Myles McNutt of The A.V. Club gave the episode a "C–" grade and wrote, "Why does any of this matter if the show is just going to forget any of it happened a year from now? It's a bad question to be asking, but a downright destructive one when the show is about to write out its central character while awkwardly writing another one back in. That's a tough thing for any show to navigate, but a downright impossible one for a show this discombobulate."

Derek Lawrence of Entertainment Weekly wrote "As Emmy Rossum's incredible nine-season run on Shameless hits the home stretch, her character's arc just keeps getting darker and darker. Not only has her life crumbled apart, but she's also now unknowingly ruining other people's lives. And while she continues to spiral out of control, the baton has been passed to Lip as the responsible head of the family, a transition clearly in the works to set up a Rossom-less future." David Crow of Den of Geek gave the episode a 4 star rating out of 5 and wrote "The answer, I think, is something a little sadder than that. As we realize by this episode's truly heartbreaking cliffhanger, the writer's room has not actually forgotten the recent reintroduction of consequence (well, sans the Frank/Ingrid storyline); they're just recalibrating for Emmy Rossum's exit from the series."

Kimberly Ricci of Uproxx wrote "I stated that Fiona had nothing left to lose, but she slid even further during this week's episode, “The Hobo Games.” That title refers to Frank's latest get rich scheme and matters very little to the rest of the episode, other than Ingrid finally getting a whiff of Frank's flakiness and breaking up with him." Christopher Dodson of Show Snob wrote "Shameless has seen a resurgence of confrontational writing this season, most of it leading to Fiona being despised by everyone. Frank is still in contention for his greatest prize but has to deal with Ingrid."

Jade Budowski of Decider wrote "What a shame to watch the closest two siblings in the family completely destroy their relationship for reasons that probably could have been avoided with a little communication (and more thoughtful writing, maybe?)." Paul Dailly of TV Fanatic gave the episode a 3.25 star rating out of 5, and wrote, ""The Hobo Games" was a mixed bag. Some parts were great, but others dragged."
