= You'll Know the Bottom When You Hit It =

- Shameless episode
- Episode no.: Season 9 Episode 12
- Directed by: Shari Springer Berman and Robert Pulcini
- Written by: Joe Lawson
- Cinematography by: Anthony Hardwick
- Editing by: Russell Denove
- Original release date: February 17, 2019
- Running time: 57 minutes

Guest appearances
- Sharif Atkins as Peter Naylor; Scott Michael Campbell as Brad; Sarah Colonna as Lori; Rebecca Field as Eliza; Jess Gabor as Kelly Keefe; Amirah Johnson as Alexandra "Xan" Galvez; Maddie McCormick as Corey Tamietti; Kate Miner as Tami Tamietti; Eddie Alfano as K.J.; Jim Hoffmaster as Kermit; Michael Patrick McGill as Tommy

Episode chronology
← Previous "The Hobo Games"	Next → "Lost"
- Shameless season 9

"You'll Know the Bottom When You Hit It" is the twelfth episode of the ninth season of the American television comedy drama Shameless, an adaptation of the British series of the same name. It is the 108th overall episode of the series and was written by co-executive producer Joe Lawson, and directed by Shari Springer Berman and Robert Pulcini. It originally aired on Showtime on February 24, 2019.

The series is set on the South Side of Chicago, Illinois, and depicts the poor, dysfunctional family of Frank Gallagher, a neglectful single father of six: Fiona, Phillip, Ian, Debbie, Carl, and Liam. He spends his days drunk, high, or in search of money, while his children need to learn to take care of themselves. In the episode, Frank and Fiona team up during a blackout to raise money, while Lip tries to contact Tami. Meanwhile, Carl tries to prevent Debbie and Kelly from hanging out.

According to Nielsen Media Research, the episode was seen by an estimated 0.81 million household viewers and gained a 0.24 ratings share among adults aged 18–49. The episode received positive reviews from critics, who praised the emotional tone and character development.

== Plot ==
Lip (Jeremy Allen White) helps Xan (Amirah Johnson) in packing her stuff, just as Naylor (Sharif Atkins) arrives to assign her to a new foster house. Lip shares an emotional farewell with her, and sees her being driven off. Then, he runs upstairs and throws Fiona's belongings in trash bags outside.

A power outage hits the city, ruining business at the Alibi. Frank (William H. Macy) buys a remote electric generator from a neighbor, and offers Fiona (Emmy Rossum) a partnership in which they can sell cold products, which she accepts. She also helps by making a copy of her Patsy's master key and stealing ice from the freezer. When they get home, Fiona finds her belongings and fights Lip inside. Lip pleads for her to go to Alcoholics Anonymous, but she refuses by walking out and drinking a beer. Seeing the situation, Frank tells Lip, "It's tough raising six kids by yourself. I couldn't have done it without her."

Carl (Ethan Cutkosky) and Debbie (Emma Kenney) continue fighting for Kelly (Jess Gabor), trying to win her over by watching her baseball game. After Carl questions her over trying to have sex with Debbie, Kelly breaks up with him, feeling he is too controlling in their relationship. With no place to sleeps, Fiona asks Veronica (Shanola Hampton) if she can stay with her, and she agrees. To prevent the meats from rotting, Kevin (Steve Howey) decides to throw a BBQ for the neighborhood. Realizing that South Side is the only place in the city with no electricity, Fiona convinces the neighborhood in marching to protest. As they reach the end of the neighborhood, they discover that the blackout has ended. They return to South Side, and Fiona is frustrated that they did nothing.

After discovering that Lip kicked her out, Veronica visits Lip to talk about Fiona. Lip expresses no regret over his actions, and warns Veronica not to let Fiona stay with her. He says that in order for Fiona to fully recover, she must hit rock bottom. That night, as the patrons at the Alibi celebrate, Fiona insults them for never trying to step up and do something for a change. Frank is affected by her words and behavior, realizing the extent of the damage she inflicted. Veronica tells Fiona that she cannot stay with her, and while hurt, Fiona accepts it. The next morning, Fiona wakes up in her old apartment building with an asleep Frank. She experiences withdrawal, and she cries after realizing she hit rock bottom. She attends an AA meeting, where she exchanges looks with Lip.

== Production ==
=== Development ===
The episode was written by co-executive producer Joe Lawson, and directed by Shari Springer Berman and Robert Pulcini. It was Lawson's third writing credit, and Berman's and Pulcini's first directing credit.

== Reception ==
=== Viewers ===
In its original American broadcast, "You'll Know the Bottom When You Hit It" was seen by an estimated 0.81 million household viewers with a 0.24 in the 18–49 demographics. This means that 0.24 percent of all households with televisions watched the episode. This was a 15 percent decrease in viewership from the previous episode, which was seen by an estimated 0.97 million household viewers with a 0.32 in the 18–49 demographics.

=== Critical reviews ===
"You'll Know the Bottom When You Hit It" received positive reviews from critics. Myles McNutt of The A.V. Club gave the episode a "B" grade and wrote, "There is so little positive momentum on the edges of this story that it's hard not to imagine it all falling apart in Fiona's absence, with the writers only then realizing they've got no foundation left to hold it together. The part sof this episode that elevated it over the rest of the season are the same the show is about to lose, and unless that forces the kind of self-reflection Fiona finds on the stairs of the abandoned building that used to be her future, there's little hope this momentum continues on into next season and beyond."

Derek Lawrence of Entertainment Weekly wrote "How do you know you've hit rock bottom? Well, bonding and teaming up with Frank has to be the clearest sign. And while that partnership proved to be just what Fiona needed to realize how far she's fallen, it also provided a welcomed dynamic, especially considering this could be Frank and Fiona's last significant storyline before Emmy Rossum departs."

David Crow of Den of Geek gave the episode a 2.5 star rating out of 5 and wrote "Right now though, the show is doing no favors in making us want to watch that house after Rossum's gone, which is a bizarre choice." Christopher Dodson of Show Snob wrote "Shameless has only two more episodes left this season, and Emmy Rossum has announced her departure from the show. How will she go out? Is Fiona headed to rehab, or will a quick relapse after her first meeting send her into street urchin status?"

Jade Budowski of Decider wrote "Emmy Rossum has just two more weeks left on Shameless, and we still haven't the slightest clue how she'll be written off. At this point, the exit strategy should probably be making itself known in some way or another, but I suppose that might be asking too much from Shameless these days." Paul Dailly of TV Fanatic gave the episode a 4.75 star rating out of 5, and wrote, ""You'll Know the Bottom When You Hit It" was a solid episode of Shameless. Despite some questionable plot choices, it feels like the show is getting back to the one we know and love."
