= Robert Lopez =

American songwriter and librettist (born 1975)

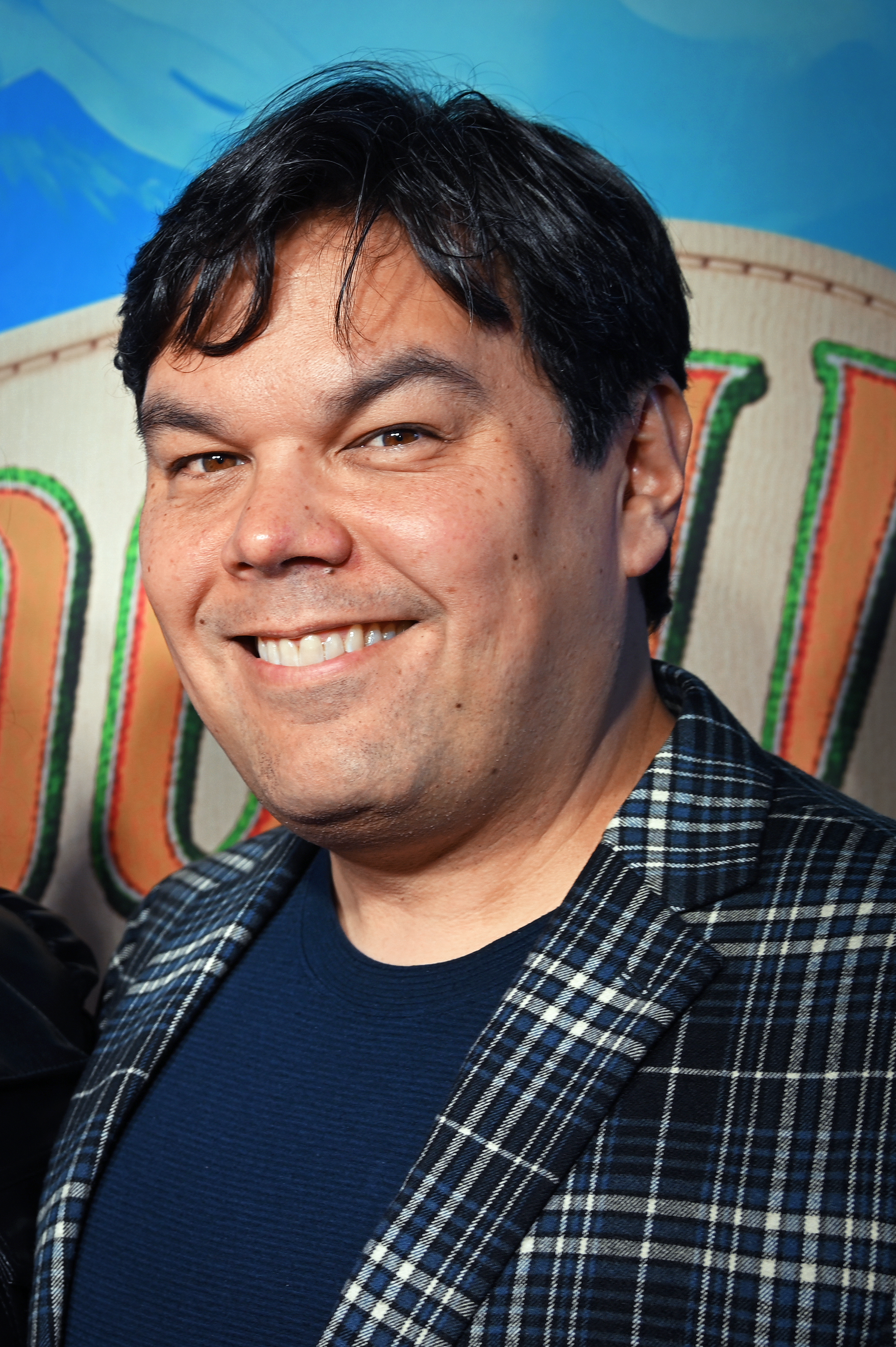
- Lopez in 2026
- Born: February 23, 1975 (age 51); New York City, New York, U.S.
- Education: Yale University (BA)
- Occupations: Songwriter; Playwright
- Spouse: Kristen Anderson-Lopez (m. 2003)
- Children: 2
- Awards: Full list

Robert Lopez (born February 23, 1975) is an American songwriter, best known for co-creating the musicals Avenue Q (with Jeff Marx) and The Book of Mormon (with Trey Parker and Matt Stone). He co-wrote songs for the Disney animated films Frozen, Frozen 2 and Coco with his wife, Kristen Anderson-Lopez. He is signed to Disney Music Publishing.

He is one of the few people to win the EGOT (Emmy, Grammy, Oscar and Tony). He is the only person to have won all four awards more than once, having won two Oscars, three Tonys, three Grammys, and four Emmys. With a second set of competitive wins beginning with his June 27, 2010, Emmy and concluding with his March 4, 2018, Academy Award, he broke his own 'fastest to complete' record, establishing a new fastest EGOT interval at 7 years and 8 months. This was later broken by Benj Pasek and Justin Paul (7 years 7 months).

== Early life ==
Robert Lopez was born in Manhattan, to Katherine (née Lowe) and Frank Lopez. He is of Filipino descent through his father (who was born on a ship in the middle of the ocean after departing Manila); his paternal grandfather was Filipino, and his paternal grandmother was of half Filipino and half Scottish-American descent (both originally resided in Manila). Frank was director of publications for NYU Langone Medical Center.

Lopez spent his childhood in Greenwich Village, except for a year in Massachusetts while his father worked for Clark University. Upon returning to Manhattan, "it was a fluke" that he started piano lessons at Greenwich House Music School. The apartment they were subletting had a piano; his mother asked if he wanted to take lessons, and he said yes. At age seven, his parents bought him a piano, he saw his first Broadway show (A Chorus Line) and he wrote his first song, "Oy Vey, What a Day". At around age 12, he briefly moved from piano to saxophone, and took composition courses at other schools. Influences included Billy Joel and Stephen Sondheim.

Lopez attended Hunter College Elementary School, Hunter College High School and Yale University where he graduated in 1997 with a BA in English. At Yale, he wrote three plays (two of which were musicals) and was a member of the Yale Spizzwinks a cappella group. Influences included Vincent Scully, John Hollander and Harold Bloom. He took Bloom's Shakespeare class and was interested by his idea of the Bible as literature. Bloom encouraged him to read The Book of Mormon. During his time at Yale, he vaguely hoped to make a living writing musicals and "had no [other] career options"; towards that end, he avoided courses that would prepare him for a career in something more secure like law or medicine.

== Career ==
=== 1998–2004: Avenue Q ===
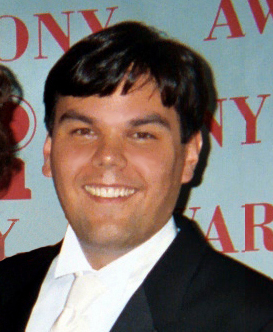
Lopez receiving his Tony Award in 2004

Upon graduating from Yale, Lopez moved back in with his parents and brother in Greenwich Village, where he lived for four years until he was able to earn enough money writing songs for Theatreworks USA to rent an apartment of his own. During this period, he took temporary jobs at companies like Pfizer and worked as a weekend receptionist for his old music school, Greenwich House.

In 1998, while participating in the BMI Lehman Engel Musical Theater Workshop, he met another aspiring songwriter, Jeff Marx. Their first project together, Kermit, Prince of Denmark, a Muppet parody of Hamlet, won the Kleban Award for lyrics, though The Jim Henson Company rejected the script, saying it did not have enough "kid appeal." The story was considered for the next Muppet film by Chris Curtin in 2004, until Curtin left the Disney Company. Highlights from the unproduced musical were performed by Rick Lyon, Rebecca Jones and Susan Blackwell at the BMI Workshop.

In 1999, Lopez and Marx, who collaborated on both music and lyrics, began work on Avenue Q, a stage musical which, using puppet characters similar to those on Sesame Street, dealt with adult themes. The show, for which Lopez also provided the animated segments, was his first professional experience. It was influenced by South Park and its film adaptation, South Park: Bigger, Longer & Uncut. After playing Off-Broadway, the show transferred in July 2003 to Broadway's John Golden Theatre, where it proved both a critical and commercial success, winning the 2004 Tony Award for Best Musical and earning Lopez and Marx the Tony Award for Best Original Score. The original cast recording was nominated for a Grammy Award in 2004. Ben Brantley wrote that Lopez and Marx "demonstrate that ambivalence, indecision and low expectations can be the basis for a thoroughly infectious musical."

=== 2005–2011: The Book of Mormon ===
Trey Parker and Matt Stone, the creators of South Park, saw Avenue Q on Broadway. Lopez spotted them in the audience, and they went out for drinks. He expressed interest in a musical on Mormonism, a subject which had long fascinated Parker and Stone. The Book of Mormon premiered at the Eugene O'Neill Theatre on March 24, 2011, following previews from February 24. The show received many awards, including the Best Original Score, Best Book of a Musical and Best Musical. The cast album also earned the 2012 Grammy Award for Best Musical Theater Album. The musical follows a pair of mismatched Mormon missionaries (Josh Gad and Andrew Rannells) who are dispatched to an AIDS-plagued Ugandan village ruled by a warlord. Ben Brantley wrote "in setting these dark elements to sunny melodies, The Book of Mormon achieves something like a miracle. It both makes fun of and ardently embraces the all-American art form of the inspirational book musical." He writes: "Mr. Rannells’s character beards the den of the evil warlord (Brian Tyree Henry) and, much like Julie Andrews in The Sound of Music, sings radiantly of his faith and hope and determination. The warlord isn’t buying any of it, and the priceless contrast between attitudes here is the difference between the world of musicals and the world of real life. The Book of Mormon thoroughly understands this difference. This makes all the sweeter its celebration of the privilege, for just a couple of hours, of living inside that improbable paradise called a musical comedy."

In 2006, Lopez collaborated with his brother, Billy, on several episodes of Wonder Pets!, for which they shared a Daytime Emmy award with the series' other composers and music director, Jeffrey Lesser, in 2008. Lopez and his wife, Kristen Anderson-Lopez, co-wrote a musical adaptation of Pixar's Finding Nemo, which opened at Disney's Animal Kingdom in January 2007.

On January 18, 2007, Lopez and Marx reunited to write four songs for the Scrubs episode "My Musical." TV Guide named the episode one of the best 100 TV episodes of all time in 2009. Lopez, along with Jeff Marx, was recognized with an Emmy nomination for the song "Everything Comes Down to Poo" from the above-mentioned episode. Stephanie D'Abruzzo, who created the roles of Kate Monster and Lucy the Slut in Avenue Q, guest-starred.

In 2010, Lopez wrote “Bet Against the American Dream” for This American Life. It parodies The Producers, where the two main characters realize you can make more money with a flop than you can with a hit, and plan to oversell investments in a flop. Lopez’s song applies the principle to Magnetar Capital, which used collateralized debt obligations and knowingly sold worthless stock, contributing to the subprime mortgage crisis. On June 25, 2010, Lopez won his second Daytime Creative Arts Emmy for Outstanding Achievement in Music Direction and Composition for his work on Wonder Pets! In 2011, Lopez reunited with Parker and Stone on the South Park episode "Broadway Bro Down.”

Lopez co-wrote two songs for Phineas and Ferb: "Aerial Area Rug" for the episode "Magic Carpet Ride" and "Fly On the Wall" for the eponymous episode. Lopez composed "Enjoy It While You Can" for The Simpsons episode "A Totally Fun Thing That Bart Will Never Do Again".

=== 2011–present: EGOT ===
Lopez and his wife Kristen Anderson-Lopez wrote seven songs for Winnie the Pooh (2011). They also wrote an original song for Wreck-It Ralph that was cut from the finished film.

In 2013, Lopez and Anderson-Lopez wrote songs for Frozen. Their "Let It Go" won the Academy Award for Best Original Song, making Lopez the 12th person to achieve the EGOT. On February 8, 2015, they won the Grammy Award for Best Song Written for Visual Media for "Let It Go".

In development for several years by Lopez and Anderson-Lopez, their romantic-comedy musical Up Here debuted August 9, 2015, at San Diego's La Jolla Playhouse. Lopez describes Up Here as "Annie Hall meets Cirque du Soleil. It's a romantic comedy with a huge theatrical twist." Lopez and his wife wrote the musical number "Moving Pictures" for the 87th Academy Awards.

It was announced in late 2015 that Lopez would be writing original songs for the revival of the cult comedy series Mystery Science Theater 3000.

Lopez and his wife were attached to write the music for the Disney film Gigantic, an animated retelling of "Jack and the Beanstalk", but the film was shelved in October 2017.

The Disney/Pixar film Coco, (2017), features Lopez and Anderson-Lopez's song "Remember Me". The song won the 2018 Academy Award for Best Original Song, making Lopez the first double EGOT winner. Lopez and Anderson-Lopez composed the theme music from the MCU show WandaVision, which premiered on Disney+ on January 15, 2021. They returned to write multiple versions of "The Ballad of the Witches’ Road" for the WandaVision spin-off Agatha All Along. In 2026, the pair wrote "Don't Kill the World" for VisionQuest, the final installment of the WandaVision trilogy.

== Personal life ==
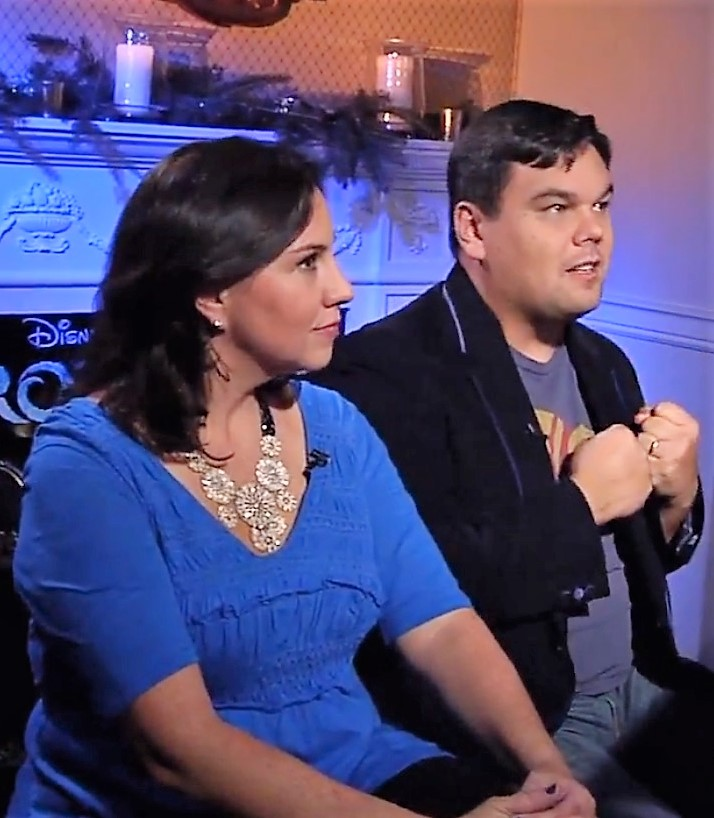
Kristen and Robert Lopez interviewed on Dulce Osuna in 2019

During his participation in the 1999 BMI Lehman Engel Musical Theatre Workshop, Robert Lopez met and began dating lyricist Kristen Anderson. As described in a 2003 The New York Times profile, the pair, struggling in a cash-strapped post-college period that recalls the storyline of Avenue Q's Princeton and Kate Monster, "live[d] in Astoria, Queens, [drove] a 1989 Buick and survive[d] on fast food".

The couple married in 2003 and their two daughters, Katie and Annie, had voice parts in Frozen, with Katie voicing 5-year-old Anna and Annie voicing a troll. As of 2014 they resided in the Park Slope neighborhood of Brooklyn.

He is cousins with stand-up comedian Tim Dillon. In his youth, he was a Catholic, but in 2011 he called himself "sort of agnostic."

== Work ==
=== Film ===
Year	Title	Role	Notes
2011	Winnie the Pooh	Music and lyrics	
2013	Frozen	Music and lyrics	
2015	Frozen Fever	Music and lyrics	Short film
2017	Coco	Music and lyrics	
2019	Frozen 2	Story writer, music, and lyrics	

=== Television ===
Year	Title	Role	Episode
2006–08	Wonder Pets!	Composer	12 episodes
2007	Scrubs	Music and lyrics	Episode: "My Musical"
2011	Phineas and Ferb	Music and lyrics	Episode: "Magic Carpet Ride”
2011	South Park	Music and lyrics	Episode: "Broadway Bro Down"
2017–22	Mystery Science Theater 3000	Writer	2 episodes
2021	WandaVision	Music and lyrics	7 episodes
2021	We the People	Songwriter	
2022	Central Park	Music and lyrics	Episode: "Castle Sweet Castle"
2023	Up Here	Writer, executive producer, music, and lyrics	
2024	Agatha All Along	Lyrics	9 episodes
2026	VisionQuest	Music (TBC) and lyrics	Episode 8: "Forever"

=== Theatre ===
Year	Title	Role	Venue
2003	Avenue Q	Music and lyrics	John Golden Theatre, Broadway
2006	Finding Nemo – The Musical	Music and lyrics	Disney's Animal Kingdom
2011	The Book of Mormon	Book, music, and lyrics	Eugene O'Neill Theatre, Broadway
2015	Up Here	Book, music, and lyrics	La Jolla Playhouse
2018	Frozen	Music and lyrics	St. James Theatre, Broadway
2026	The Book of Mormon	Moroni, Doctor, Latter-day Saints church executive	Broadway stage debut, 15th anniversary special performances, Eugene O'Neill Theatre
