= Remember Me (Coco song) =

Song from the film Coco

Song by Benjamin Bratt

from the album Coco (Original Motion Picture Soundtrack)
- Released: 10 November 2017
- Recorded: 2017
- Length: 1:49
- Label: Walt Disney
- Songwriters: Kristen Anderson-Lopez; Robert Lopez

"Remember Me", known as "Recuérdame" in Spanish, is a song from the 2017 animated Disney/Pixar film Coco, written by Robert Lopez and Kristen Anderson-Lopez. The song is performed variously within the film by Benjamin Bratt, Gael García Bernal, Anthony Gonzalez, and Ana Ofelia Murguía. Miguel and Natalia Lafourcade perform a pop version of the song that is featured in the film's end credits. Carlos Rivera recorded a cover version of the song for the film's Spanish-language soundtrack album. It won Best Original Song at the 90th Academy Awards in 2018. The song was performed live by Gael García Bernal and Federico Ramos on guitar.

This song was featured in ABC's 2020 television special The Disney Family Singalong: Volume II performed by Christina Aguilera, Miguel and Mariachi Divas de Cindy Shea.

== Context ==
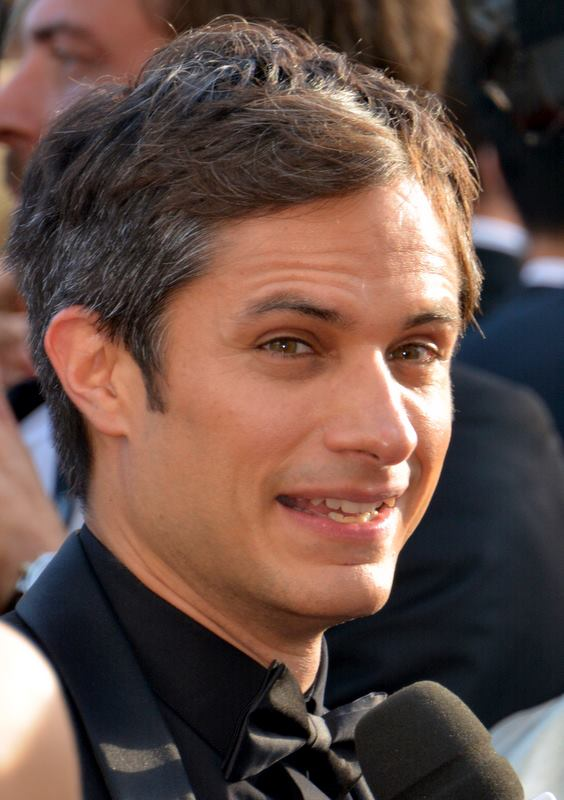
Gael García Bernal voiced Héctor in the English and Spanish versions of the movie.

The song is used in a variety of contexts throughout the film. It was known as Ernesto de la Cruz's (Benjamin Bratt) most "popular" song. The song was originally written by his partner Héctor Rivera (Gael García Bernal), and was first introduced as a mariachi arrangement, as a plea from Ernesto to his fans to keep him in their minds even as he tours in other places. It next appears as a lullaby from Héctor to his daughter Coco. It is then used as a nostalgic song to connect an older Coco (Ana Ofelia Murguía) to an earlier time in her life and is sung by Coco and her great-grandson Miguel (Anthony Gonzalez). It finally appears in a pop version played during the end credits, sung by singers Miguel and Natalia Lafourcade.

The piece is the "tie that binds multiple generations in the shared love of music".

== Production ==
Frozen team Kristen Anderson-Lopez and Robert Lopez were hired for the project. Director Lee Unkrich had admired them since they wrote Finding Nemo – The Musical in 2006. The film developed into a musical, but not a "break-into-song" type. A challenge with the song was in crafting lyrics that would pivot in meaning depending on the context in which they were sung. The team researched popular Mexican music, and wanted to write a song that could have been sung by Jorge Negrete or Pedro Infante. They wrote it as a bolero-ranchero style song, knowing that it could also work if performed as a quiet ballad. Robert wrote the music, and Kristen wrote the lyrics. She wanted to explore the idea of remembering people when they are far away, and explained "the power of music to bring people back to life, literally and figuratively".

== Accolades ==
"Remember Me" won the Academy Award for Best Original Song; with this win, composer Robert Lopez became the first ever double EGOT winner. The song also won the Critics' Choice Movie Award for Best Song and was nominated for the Golden Globe Award for Best Original Song and the Grammy Award for Best Song Written for Visual Media.

Awards
Award	Category	Result
Academy Awards	Best Original Song	Won
Awards Circuit Community Awards	Best Original Song	Nominated
Capri Hollywood International Film Festival	Best Original Song	Won
Critics' Choice Awards	Best Song	Won
Denver Film Critics Society Awards	Best Original Song	Won
Georgia Film Critics Association Awards	Best Original Song	Won
Gold Derby Film Awards	Best Original Song	Nominated
Gold Derby Film Decade Awards	Best Original Song of the Decade	Nominated
Golden Globe Awards	Best Original Song	Nominated
Grammy Awards	Best Song Written for Visual Media	Nominated
Guild of Music Supervisors Awards	Best Song/Recording Created for a Film	Nominated
Hawaii Film Critics Society Awards	Best Song	Nominated
Houston Film Critics Society Awards	Best Original Song	Won
International Online Cinema Awards	Best Original Song	Nominated
Iowa Film Critics Awards	Best Song	Won
Las Vegas Film Critics Society Awards	Best Song	Won
Online Film & Television Association Awards	Best Original Song	Won
Phoenix Film Critics Society Awards	Best Original Song	Won

== Certifications ==
Region	Certification	Certified units/sales
United States (RIAA)	Platinum	1,000,000^{‡}
United States (RIAA) Pop version	Gold	500,000^{‡}
^{‡} Sales+streaming figures based on certification alone.

== Usage ==
"Remember Me" (lullaby version) is used as the ABRSM Piano Grade 1 exam for 2025 & 2026 syllabus.
