= Coco (2017 film) =

2017 film by Lee Unkrich

- Theatrical release poster
- Directed by: Lee Unkrich
- Screenplay by: Adrian Molina; Matthew Aldrich
- Story by: Lee Unkrich; Jason Katz; Matthew Aldrich; Adrian Molina
- Produced by: Darla K. Anderson
- Starring: Anthony Gonzalez; Gael García Bernal; Benjamin Bratt; Alanna Ubach; Renée Victor; Ana Ofelia Murguía; Edward James Olmos
- Cinematography: Matt Aspbury (camera); Danielle Feinberg (lighting)
- Edited by: Steve Bloom
- Music by: Michael Giacchino
- Production company: Pixar Animation Studios
- Distributed by: Walt Disney Studios Motion Pictures (Note: Distributed under the Walt Disney Pictures banner.)
- Release dates: October 20, 2017 (Morelia); November 22, 2017 (United States)
- Running time: 105 minutes
- Country: United States
- Language: English
- Budget: $175–225 million
- Box office: $823.3 million

Coco is a 2017 American animated fantasy film directed by Lee Unkrich, and written by Adrian Molina and Matthew Aldrich. Produced by Pixar Animation Studios for Walt Disney Pictures, the film stars the voices of Anthony Gonzalez, Gael García Bernal, Benjamin Bratt, Alanna Ubach, Renée Victor, Ana Ofelia Murguía and Edward James Olmos. It follows a 12-year-old boy in Mexico named Miguel (Gonzalez) who is accidentally transported to the Land of the Dead, where he seeks the help of his deceased musician great-great-grandfather to return him to his family and reverse their ban on music.

The concept for Coco is inspired by the Mexican holiday Day of the Dead. Pixar began developing the animation in 2016. Unkrich, Molina, Anderson and some of the film's crew visited Mexico for research. Composer Michael Giacchino, who had worked on prior Pixar animated features, composed the score. With a cost of $175–225 million, Coco is the first film with a nine-figure budget to feature an all-Latino principal cast.

Coco premiered on October 20, 2017, during the Morelia International Film Festival in Morelia, Mexico. It was theatrically released in Mexico the following week, the weekend before Día de Muertos, and in the United States on November 22, 2017. The film received critical acclaim for its animation, voice acting, music, visuals, emotional story, and respect for Mexican culture. It grossed over $823 million worldwide, becoming the 15th highest-grossing animated film ever at the time of its release. Coco received two awards at the 90th Academy Awards and numerous other accolades. The film was chosen by the National Board of Review as the Best Animated Film of 2017. A sequel, titled Coco 2, is scheduled to be released on November 21, 2029.

== Plot ==
In the Mexican town of Santa Cecilia, a young woman named Imelda marries a man who eventually leaves her and their daughter Coco to pursue a music career. When he never returns, Imelda bans music from her family and opens a shoemaking business.

Decades later, Imelda's great-great-grandson Miguel lives in the family home with his parents and relatives, including an elderly and ailing Coco. Despite the family's continued ban on music, Miguel secretly loves it and teaches himself to play guitar by watching the VHS documentary of his idol, the late musician Ernesto de la Cruz. On the Day of the Dead, Miguel inadvertently bumps the family ofrenda and breaks a frame containing a photo of Imelda and an infant Coco. He discovers a hidden section of the photograph that shows his great-great-grandfather, whose head has been torn from the photo, holding Ernesto's famous guitar. Believing this proves Ernesto is his relative, Miguel excitedly tells his family about his musical aspirations. In response, Miguel's grandmother, Elena, destroys his guitar, causing him to shun his family.

Miguel breaks into Ernesto's mausoleum and takes his guitar to use in a local talent competition. Once Miguel strums it, he becomes invisible to all living people. However, he can interact with his skeletal dead relatives, who are visiting from the Land of the Dead for the holiday. Taking him back with them, they realize Imelda cannot visit since Miguel removed her photo from the ofrenda. Miguel also discovers that he has been cursed for stealing from the dead: he must receive a family blessing to return to the living world before sunrise or he will remain in the Land of the Dead forever. Imelda offers him a blessing on the condition that he abandons music, but Miguel refuses and seeks Ernesto's blessing instead.

Miguel encounters Héctor, a down-on-his-luck trickster skeleton who once performed with Ernesto. Héctor offers to bring Miguel to Ernesto in exchange for Miguel placing his photo on an ofrenda so he can visit his daughter before she forgets him, which would cause him to fade from existence. Héctor helps Miguel perform in a talent competition to win entry to Ernesto's mansion, but Miguel flees after being discovered by his family.

Miguel sneaks into Ernesto's mansion and is welcomed by a surprised Ernesto, but Héctor appears and accuses Ernesto of stealing his songs. As the two argue, Miguel slowly pieces together the truth: Ernesto and Héctor were once a musical act on the brink of fame until Héctor grew homesick and tried to leave. Unable to write songs himself, Ernesto poisoned Héctor and stole his guitar and songs to pass off as his own. To protect his legacy, Ernesto seizes Héctor's photo and has Miguel and Héctor thrown into a cenote pit. There, Héctor reveals that his daughter is named Coco, thus making him Miguel's actual great-great-grandfather.

After being rescued by his family, Miguel reveals the truth about Héctor's death, and Imelda, though she is angry at Héctor, agrees to help him. The family infiltrates Ernesto's concert to retrieve Héctor's photo. Ernesto's crimes are exposed to the audience, who quickly turn on him, and he is crushed by a falling bell, mirroring his fate in real life, although Héctor's photograph is lost in the chaos. As the sun rises, Imelda and a fading Héctor unconditionally bless Miguel and return him to the living world. Back home, Miguel plays "Remember Me" on Héctor's guitar, brightening Coco to sing with him. She shares that she kept the torn piece of the photo with Héctor's face, then tells her family stories about her father, preserving his memory and existence in the Land of the Dead. Miguel reconciles with his family and their ban on music is finally lifted.

One year later, Miguel shows his new baby sister the family ofrenda, now displaying photos of Héctor and a recently deceased Coco, while Coco's collected letters from Héctor prove Ernesto's theft of his songs, leading to Ernesto's disgrace and Héctor's rightful recognition. In the Land of the Dead, Héctor joins Imelda, Coco, and their family to visit the living world. Miguel performs a heartfelt song for both his living and dead relatives.

== Voice cast ==
- Anthony Gonzalez as Miguel, a 12-year-old aspiring musician.
- Gael García Bernal as Héctor, a charming trickster in the Land of the Dead who enlists Miguel to help him visit the Land of the Living.
  - Bernal reprised his role in the Spanish-language dub of the film.
- Benjamin Bratt as Ernesto de la Cruz, the most famous musician in the history of Mexico, and Miguel's idol. Revered by fans worldwide until his untimely death, the charming and charismatic musician is even more beloved in the Land of the Dead. However, he is later revealed to be a manipulative fraudster who killed Héctor via poisoning to steal his songs and pass them off as his own.
  - Antonio Sol provides Ernesto's singing voice, with the exception of "Remember Me".
- Alanna Ubach as Mamá Imelda, Miguel's late great-great-grandmother, and Coco's mother, as well as the matriarch of the family.
- Renée Victor as Abuelita Elena, Coco's daughter and Miguel's grandmother who strictly enforces the Rivera family's music ban.
- Ana Ofelia Murguía as Mamá Coco, Miguel's great-grandmother, who moves around in a wheelchair.
  - Libertad García Fonzi as a young Coco.
- Edward James Olmos as Chicharrón, a friend of Héctor's who becomes forgotten in the Land of the Dead.
- Alfonso Arau as Papá Julio, Coco's late husband and Miguel's late great-grandfather.
  - Arau reprised his role in the Spanish-language dub of the film.
- Selene Luna as Tía Rosita, Miguel's late aunt.
- Dyana Ortellí as Tía Victoria, Miguel's late aunt.
- Herbert Sigüenza as Tíos Oscar and Felipe, Miguel's late identical twin uncles.
- Jaime Camil as Papá Enrique, Miguel's father and Abuelita's son.
- Sofía Espinosa as Mamá Luisa, Miguel's mother.
  - Espinosa reprised her role in the Spanish-language dub of the film.
- Luis Valdez as Tío Berto, Miguel's uncle, Enrique and Gloria's brother, and Abuelita's son.
  - Valdez also voices Don Hidalgo, a co-starring fictional character in a film Ernesto was the star of.
  - Valdez reprised the role of Tío Berto in the Spanish-language dub of the film.
- Carla Medina as Tía Gloria, Miguel's aunt, Enrique and Berto's sister, and Abuelita's daughter.
  - Medina also voices a departure agent.
  - Medina reprised the role of a departure agent in the Spanish-language dub of the film.
- Polo Rojas as Abel, Berto and Carmen's oldest son and Miguel's cousin.
- Montse Hernandez as Rosa, Berto and Carmen's daughter and Miguel's cousin.
- Lombardo Boyar as a plaza mariachi whom Miguel meets in Santa Cecilia Plaza.
  - Boyar also voices Gustavo, a musician of the Land of the Dead.
- Octavio Solis as arrival agent.
- Gabriel Iglesias as clerk.
- Cheech Marin as corrections officer.
- Blanca Araceli as emcee.
- Natalia Cordova-Buckley as Frida Kahlo, a famous artist.
- Salvador Reyes as a security guard.
  - Reyes reprised his role in the Spanish-language dub of the film.
- John Ratzenberger as Juan Ortodoncia, whose dentist puts his picture on an ofrenda.

The animal characters Dante and Pepita are alebrijes, spirit guides in this film. Dante is a Xoloitzcuintle with bird-like wings in his alebrije form. Pepita is a cat whose alebrije form gives her the head, torso, and front paws of a jaguar, the horns of a ram, the wings and hindlegs of an eagle, and the tail of an iguana.

== Production ==
=== Development ===
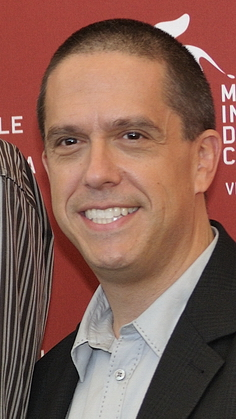
Lee Unkrich (pictured in 2009) first conceptualized Coco in 2010.

Lee Unkrich first pitched an idea for the film in 2010, when Toy Story 3, which he also directed, was released. Initially, the film was to be about an American child, learning about his Mexican heritage, while dealing with the death of his mother. Eventually, the team decided that this was the wrong approach and reformed the film to focus on a Mexican child instead. Of the original version, Unkrich noted that it "reflected the fact that none of us at the time were from Mexico". The fact that the film depicted "a real culture" caused anxiety for Unkrich, who "felt an enormous responsibility on [his] shoulders to do it right".

The Pixar team made several trips to Mexico to help define the characters and story of Coco. Unkrich said, "I'd seen it portrayed in folk art. There was something about the juxtaposition of skeletons with bright, festive colors that captured my imagination. It has led me down a winding path of discovery. And the more I learn about [el] Día de los Muertos, the more it affects me deeply." The team found it difficult working with skeletal creatures, as they lacked any muscular system, and as such had to be animated differently from their human counterparts. Coco also took inspiration from Hayao Miyazaki's anime films Spirited Away (2001) and Howl's Moving Castle (2004) as well as the action film John Wick (2014).

In 2013, Disney requested to trademark the phrase "Día de los Muertos" for merchandising applications. This was met with criticism from the Mexican-American community in the United States. Lalo Alcaraz, a Mexican-American cartoonist, drew a film poster titled Muerto Mouse, depicting a skeletal Godzilla-sized Mickey Mouse with the byline "It's coming to trademark your cultura." More than 21,000 people signed a petition on Change.org stating that the trademark was "cultural appropriation and exploitation at its worst". A week later, Disney canceled the attempt, with the official statement saying that the "trademark filing was intended to protect any title for our film and related activities. It has since been determined that the title of the film will change, and therefore we are withdrawing our trademark filing." In 2015, Pixar hired Alcaraz to consult on the film, joining playwright Octavio Solis and former CEO of the Mexican Heritage Corp. Marcela Davison Aviles, to form a cultural consultant group.

=== Story ===
Unkrich found writing the script "the toughest nut to crack". Earlier versions of the film had different universe rules regarding how Miguel (originally called Marco) would get back from the land of the dead; in one case he physically had to run across the bridge. In one version of the story, his family is cursed with singing when trying to speak, which was included as a technique to add music to a story where music is banned.

=== Casting ===
Coco is the first motion picture with a nine-figure budget to feature an all-Latino cast, with a cost of $175–200 million. Anthony Gonzalez first auditioned for the role of Miguel when he was nine and was finalized in the role two years later. Speaking of his character, Gonzalez said: "[Miguel and I] both know the importance of following our dream and we know the importance of following our tradition, so that's something that I connected with Miguel a lot". During the film's pre-production, Miguel was originally set to be voiced by a child named Emilio Fuentes, who was removed from the role after his voice deepened due to puberty throughout the film's production. However, Fuentes did voice a tourist who offers a dead person a ticket with 30 seconds on it.

In 2016, the Coco team made an official announcement about the cast, which revealed that Gael García Bernal, Benjamin Bratt, Renée Victor, and Anthony Gonzalez would voice the characters. Bratt, who voiced De la Cruz, was "moved" when he realized that Disney-Pixar wanted to make a film on Latin culture. Disney officials closely monitored Bernal's movements and expressions while he voiced the characters and used their input for animating Héctor.

Bratt voiced Ernesto de la Cruz, a character who he described as "the Mexican Frank Sinatra"; "[a] larger than life persona". On the advice of the filmmakers, Bratt watched videos of equivalent Mexican actors including Jorge Negrete and Pedro Infante. Bratt found the character similar to his father in physical appearance, "swagger and confidence", and worked in the film as a tribute to him. The character Mama Imelda's voice was provided by Alanna Ubach. Ubach said that the film "is [giving] respect to one quality that all Latin families across the universe do have in common, and that is giving respect and prioritizing the importance of family". Mama Imelda's voice was influenced by Ubach's tía Flora, who was a "profound influence in [her] life". Ubach said her tía was the family's matriarch, and dedicated the film to her.

A cameo appearance was made by actress Natalia Cordova-Buckley as Mexican artist Frida Kahlo. Unkrich stated that Cordova-Buckley's "role in Coco pays homage to Ms. Kahlo, her work and the people of Mexico who love her". Unkrich also stated that it was a struggle to find a role in the film for John Ratzenberger, who is not Latino but had voiced a character in every Pixar feature film. As Unkrich did not want to break Pixar's tradition, Ratzenberger was given a minor role with one word.

=== Animation ===
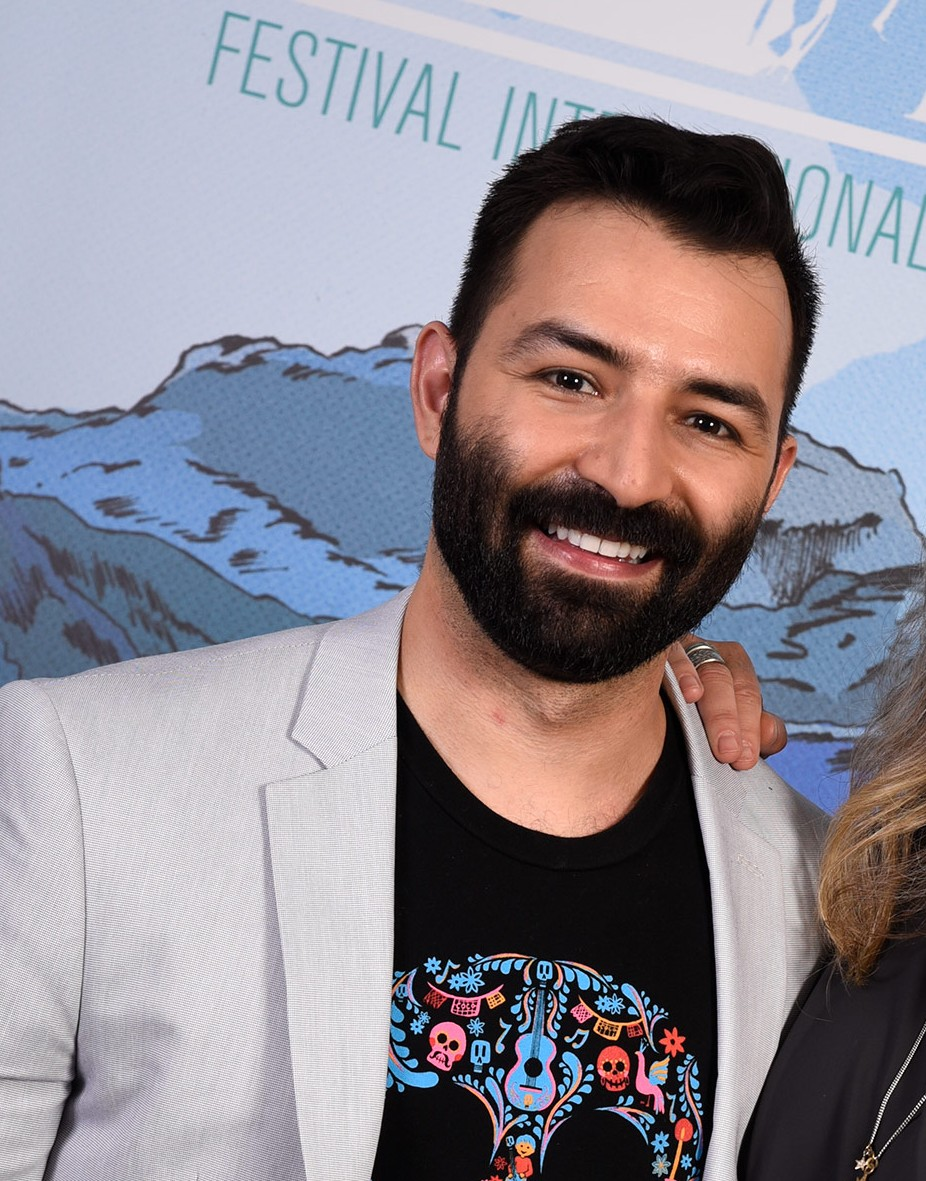
Adrian Molina at the 2017 Annecy International Animation Festival

On April 13, 2016, Unkrich announced that they had begun work on the animation. The film's writer, Adrian Molina, was promoted to co-director in 2016. Unkrich said that Pixar wanted "to have as much contrast between" the Land of the Living and the Land of the Dead and that many techniques were used to differentiate the worlds. Color was one: "Given the holiday and the iconography, [Pixar] knew the Land of the Dead had to be a visually vibrant and colorful place, so [they] deliberately designed Santa Cecilia to be more muted" said Unkrich.

According to Harley Jessup, the film's production designer, Santa Cecilia is based on real Mexican villages, as the production team "stayed grounded in reality in the Land of the Living". Chris Bernardi, the film's set supervisor, said that the town was made small so Miguel could feel confined. Bert Berry, the film's art director, said that aged building materials were used to depict Santa Cecilia "as an older charming city". According to Unkrich, Miguel's guitar playing is authentic, as they "videotaped musicians playing each song or melody and strapped GoPros on their guitars" to use as a reference. For the scene in which Miguel plays music in his secret hideout, the filmmakers used "very elegant, lyrical camera moves" and "gentle drifts and slow arcing moves around Miguel as he plays his guitar with very shallow depth of field to enhance the beauty of the soft-focus foreground candles".

Christian Hoffman, the film's character supervisor, said that all of the details in Mama Coco's face were not modeled. Instead, his team used special software to design separate layers of detail, which were then added to her face with a shader. The character's model was made with higher resolution to get all the wrinkles right, according to Hoffman. Pixar used some Xolo dogs as a reference for the character Dante, while a tentacle from Finding Dory's Hank was used for his tongue.

Jessup called the marigold petal bridge that connects both worlds "elegant and magical". Michael K. O'Brien, the film's effects supervisor, called it "a huge technical challenge" for the animation team, but referred to it as something "so visually exciting with petals dripping from it; it was a massive artistic undertaking. [the production team] wanted it to glow—to feel alive". The scenes in which Miguel takes a few petals off of the bridge and in which Hector sinks into the bridge were given more effects and special art direction.

For the Land of the Dead, Unkrich did not want "to have just a free-for-all, wacky world", wanting instead to add logic and be "ever-expanding because new residents would arrive regularly". Jessup said that the animation team wanted the Land of the Dead "to be a vibrant explosion of color" when Miguel arrived. Jessup also said that "Lee [Unkrich] described a vertical world of towers, contrasting with the flatness of Santa Cecilia. The lights and reflections are dazzling and there's a crazy transportation system that connects it all. The costume colors are much more vibrant than in the Land of the Living, where [the animation team] tried to stay grounded in reality. [They] really went all out in the Land of the Dead to make it a reflection of the holiday". According to David Ryu, the film's supervising technical director, the animation team "figured out a way to introduce a single light — but give it a million points" for the scenes on the outside in the Land of the Dead: "The renderer sees it as one light, but we see a million lights".

According to art director Daniel Arriaga, the animators "had to figure out how to give [the skeletons] personality without skin, muscles, noses or even lips" and that they "played with shapes and did a lot of paintings. [They] sculpted and studied skulls from every angle to figure out where [they] could add appeal and charm". Global technology supervisor J.D. Northrup was hired early in the film's production to avoid potential issues in the film's animation process. Northrup said "Each [of the skeletons' pieces] had to be independent so the complexity of the rig and the stress that it puts on the pipeline were something like we've never seen before." Northrup was also tasked with simplifying the skeleton's elements to render the skeleton crowds. To create the skeletons, several additional controls were used, as they "needed to move in ways that humans don't," according to character modeling and articulation lead Michael Honse. Honse said that the bones were a particular problem, stating that "there was a lot of back-and-forth with animation to get it right," but found "really cool ways" to move the skeletons.

== Marketing and release ==
The first teaser of Coco was released on March 15, 2017. The teaser trailer introduced the basic concept of the film while highlighting its focus on music. Scott Mendelson of Forbes praised the trailer as "a terrific old-school Pixar sell, mostly consisting of a single sequence and offering just the barest hint of what's to come." The film's themes and imagery drew comparison to another animated film that centered around el Día de los Muertos, The Book of Life (2014). A two-minute short film, titled Dante's Lunch – A Short Tail, was released online on March 29, 2017. It introduces the film's supporting character, a Xoloitzcuintle named Dante. The short was created early in the animation process by Unkrich and his team to have a better sense of the character.

The first official trailer was released on June 7, 2017, followed by a second trailer on September 13. The film was marketed extensively in Mexico, including traditional wall-painted advertising usually used for local events and never for films. Cinépolis, a movie chain in the country, held a contest for dubbing a character in the film, and another movie chain held a contest to become an interviewer for the cast and crew of the film.

Coco premiered on October 27, 2017, at the Morelia International Film Festival. It was released in the United States on November 22, in 3D. The film was initially scheduled for release on June 17, 2016, but was later pushed back to November 22, 2017. In theaters, the film was accompanied by Walt Disney Animation Studios' 21-minute featurette Olaf's Frozen Adventure as a limited-time offering through December 7, 2017 ahead of the featurette's originally-intended network television premiere on December 14, 2017. This made Coco the first Pixar film not to be accompanied by a Pixar short (or any short as of December 8, 2017) since their first film, Toy Story (1995), which was not accompanied by a short film during its worldwide theatrical run apart from select theaters which showed The Adventures of André & Wally B. (1984) (or in select international territories, Roller Coaster Rabbit (1990)) before the film. The film also has its own VR game, being Pixar's first VR development.

Coco was released for high-definition online streaming and digital download on February 13, 2018, and on DVD, Blu-ray, and 4K Ultra HD Blu-ray on February 27, 2018, by Walt Disney Studios Home Entertainment. The film made a revenue of $72.8 million from home video sales with 3.8 million units sold, making it the fourth best-selling title of 2018.

A sing-along version of the film with onscreen lyrics was released on Disney+ on September 16, 2022.

As part of Disney's 100th anniversary, Coco was re-released between September 15–28, 2023 in the United States and October 26-November 1 in Latin America alongside Walt Disney Animation Studios' Moana.

== Reception ==
=== Box office ===
Coco grossed $210.4 million in the United States and Canada, and $612.8 million in other countries, for a worldwide total of $823.3 million.

==== Mexico ====
Coco was released in Mexico on October 27, nearly one month prior to the United States. It grossed $9.3 million on its opening weekend, the biggest opening weekend for an original animated film, and the biggest debut for an animated film outside of the summer movie season in the market. In its second weekend, it earned another $10.8 million, a 12% increase over its first weekend, bringing its total to $28 million. It became the fastest ten-day grosser ever for an animated feature in Mexico, and the biggest original animated release ever in the territory. It dropped by 23% in its third weekend, grossing $8.4 million. That brought its total to MX$792 million (US$41.4 million), making it the highest-grossing animated film and the second-highest-grossing film of all time in Mexico, behind Marvel's The Avengers, in local currency. A few days later, on November 15, it passed The Avengers to become the highest-grossing film in the Mexican market.

==== United States and Canada ====
In the United States and Canada, Coco was projected to gross $55–65 million from 3,987 theaters in its first five days, including around $40 million in its opening weekend. It made $2.3 million from Tuesday night previews, landing between Disney's previous two November releases Moana ($2.6 million) and The Good Dinosaur ($1.3 million), and $13.2 million on its first day. It went on to debut to $50.8 million (including a five-day total of $72.9 million), finishing first at the box office. It was the 4th-biggest Thanksgiving opening weekend ever, behind fellow animated films Frozen, Moana, and Toy Story 2. In its second weekend, the film dropped by 46% to $27.5 million, a smaller drop than Moana, Frozen, Tangled, and The Good Dinosaur, and again topping the box office. It topped the box office once again in its third weekend, dropping by 33% and grossing $18.5 million, a similar hold to Moana. It became the fourth film of 2017 to top the box office three times, following Split, The Fate of the Furious, and The Hitman's Bodyguard, before being overtaken by Disney's Star Wars: The Last Jedi and another animated film, Ferdinand, in its fourth weekend.

It fell to number six in its fifth weekend, due to competition from three new releases—Jumanji: Welcome to the Jungle, Pitch Perfect 3, and The Greatest Showman—despite a small drop again; it grossed $2.8 million on Christmas Day. On the holiday week of December 22–28, the film finished at number six with a gross of $16.3 million, which was 6% up from the previous week, despite losing over 1,000 theaters. It finished at number six in its sixth weekend, going up 39% and 87%, respectively, during the three-day and four-day weekends; it grossed $2.6 million on New Year's Day. It fell outside the top 10 in its eighth weekend (which included Martin Luther King Jr. Day), dropping 38% and 14% respectively, during the three-day and four-day weekends.

==== Other countries ====
In China, Coco finished number one at the weekend box office, with a three-day total of $18.2 million, making it the second-highest opening ever for a Disney or Pixar animated release in that market, behind Zootopia. After seeing increases each weekday on its first week, the film increased by 148% on its second weekend, bringing its total to $75.6 million in the market. It dropped by 21% in its third weekend, finishing first once again and grossing $35 million. The film fell to number three in its fourth weekend, due to competition from two new domestic releases, grossing an additional $17.1 million. Coco's success in China came as a surprise to most box office analysts who were projecting a gross of $30–40 million. By its second weekend, it had become the highest-grossing Pixar release ever in China, nearly doubling previous record-holder Finding Dory, and by its fifth weekend, it had surpassed Despicable Me 3 to become the second highest-grossing animated movie of all time in the country, behind Zootopia. The movie was released in Japan, its final market, on March 16, 2018. As of May 1, 2018 the film's largest markets were China ($189.2 million), Mexico ($57.8 million), Japan ($41.4 million), France ($33.2 million), United Kingdom ($26.1 million), South Korea ($25.9 million), Spain ($21.4 million), Argentina ($17.6 million), Italy ($14.4 million) and Germany ($12.3 million).

=== Critical response ===
Coco received critical acclaim. (Note: Attributed to multiple references:) On the review aggregator website Rotten Tomatoes, the film holds an approval rating of 97% based on 357 reviews, with an average rating of 8.3/10. The consensus reads; "Coco's rich visual pleasures are matched by a thoughtful narrative that takes a family-friendly—and deeply affecting—approach to questions of culture, family, life, and death." On Metacritic, which assigns a normalized rating to reviews, the film has a weighted average score of 81 out of 100, based on 48 critics, indicating "universal acclaim". Audiences polled by CinemaScore gave the film a rare grade of "A+" on an A+ to F scale, one of fewer than 90 films in the history of the service to receive such a score; it was also the sixth Pixar film to earn the rating—the previous being Up in 2009. It also earned a 95% positive score, including a rare five-out-of-five rating, from filmgoers on PostTrak, along with a 76% "definite recommend".

Michael Rechtshaffen of The Hollywood Reporter said, "At every imaginative juncture, the filmmakers (the screenplay is credited to Pixar veteran Molina and Matthew Aldrich) create a richly woven tapestry of comprehensively researched storytelling, fully dimensional characters, clever touches both tender and amusingly macabre, and vivid, beautifully textured visuals." Robert Abele of TheWrap praised the film, saying: "If an animated movie is going to offer children a way to process death, it's hard to envision a more spirited, touching and breezily entertaining example than Coco." In his review for Variety, Peter Debruge wrote, "In any case, it works: Coco's creators clearly had the perfect ending in mind before they'd nailed down all the other details, and though the movie drags in places, and features a few too many childish gags... the story's sincere emotional resolution earns the sobs it's sure to inspire." Debruge also described the film as "[An] effective yet hardly exceptional addition to the Pixar oeuvre." Matt Zoller Seitz of RogerEbert.com gave the film four out of four, writing that "There's a touch of Japanese master Hayao Miyazaki in the film's matter-of-fact depiction of the dead interacting with the living, as well as its portrayal of certain creatures" such as Dante and Pepita. He concluded his review by stating, "I had some minor quibbles about [Coco] while I was watching it, but I can't remember what they were. This film is a classic."

Peter Travers of Rolling Stone rated the film 3.5 out of four, calling it a "loving tribute to Mexican culture", while praising the animation, vocal performances (particularly of Gonzalez, García Bernal, and Bratt), and its emotional and thematic tone and depth. The Chicago Tribune's Michael Phillips called the film "vividly good, beautifully animated", praising Giacchino's musical score and the songs, as well as drawing a comparison to the emotional tone of Inside Out. A. O. Scott of The New York Times praised the film as "a time-tested tune with captivating originality and flair, and with roving, playful pop-culture erudition", and called the film's cultural vibe "inclusive" and "a 21st-century Disney hallmark". Richard Roeper of the Chicago Sun-Times found the film to be "full of life" and deemed it "a bouncy and heart-tugging adventure" while lauding the vocal performances as "fantastic" and "first-rate". Brian Truitt of USA Today described the film as "effervescent, clever and thoughtful," calling it one of "Pixar's most gorgeously animated outings", and "the most musical Pixar film, with a host of catchy tunes". Stephen Whitty of the Newark Star-Ledger wrote that the backgrounds "have a vibrancy, and its atmosphere carries a warmth. And even after it's done, both linger, just a bit—like a perfectly struck guitar chord".

In February 2025, The Washington Post ranked Coco at number 5 on its list of "The 25 best movie musicals of the 21st century," with Naveen Kumar writing "The story of a music-loving boy who goes undercover to the underworld may be too frightening for kids (get ready to explain Day of the Dead). But its life lessons — about honoring the love in your life, and yes, singing a song if you have one — are packaged in more sophisticated and surprising storytelling than much of the studio's recent fare." In July 2025, it was one of the films voted for the "Readers' Choice" edition of The New York Times' list of "The 100 Best Movies of the 21st Century," finishing at number 137.

=== Accolades ===
At the 90th Academy Awards, Coco received awards for Best Animated Feature and Best Original Song. The film's other nominations include thirteen Annie Awards (winning eleven), a British Academy Film Award (which it won), two Critics' Choice Movie Awards (winning both), and two Golden Globe Awards (winning one). Coco was chosen by the National Board of Review as the Best Animated Film of 2017.

=== Controversy ===
In 2018, several Mexican news outlets reported that Disney and Pixar had failed to disclose that the producers for Coco had based the character of Mamá Coco on María de la Salud Ramírez Caballero from the Purépecha village of Santa Fe de la Laguna, "a town of Purépecha potters in Quiroga, Michoacán." In a news interview, Salud stated that the producers "offered me so many things, but nothing came of it. They only came and took my picture and took it with them. They asked me what I need. Well, look at how I live and alone. My daughters live here, behind the house. And I'm here alone, that's what I have." In a report by Telemundo, residents and artisans of Santa Fe de la Laguna recognized that the attention Salud has received from people throughout the world has increased tourism for the town. Gabriela Gabriel Fabián, a potter of the town, noted "It has benefited us because many more tourists come. This town is known because of the lady's fame, they buy our artwork, everything we do and figures of her."

While the production team at Disney and Pixar have recognized that they "based the Rivera family—a multigenerational matriarchy headed by Miguel's formidable grandmother—on real-world families with whom they embedded while visiting the Mexican states of Oaxaca and Guanajuato between 2011 and 2013", they have not acknowledged Salud's contribution to the film. Co-director Adrian Molina stated, "not only is [Coco] based in a real place, in Mexico, but it's based in real traditions, so we knew it was very important to do the research, to get every detail recorded, so that when we get back to Pixar and we start deciding what is this town going to look like, what is this grandmother going to wear, what kind of dancing and music are they going to listen to, it can all come from an informed place." However, Salud remains unmentioned in all reports Disney and Pixar have made regarding the inspiration for the film.

Since the film's release, Salud reported that tourists have visited her home, referring to her as "Mamá Coco". In response, she replied, "Yes, but ["Mamá Coco" is] not my name. [The producers] chose that name. And now all the people who come and visit tell us that's my name. But I tell them no, it's not my name. My name is María de la Salud." Before the film's release, Salud was diagnosed with chronic obstructive pulmonary disease (COPD) and depended on oxygen tanks to breathe. Salud's family had expressed that they "aren't looking to receive royalties, or money, despite [her] need to recharge her oxygen tank every two days." However, they asked "that the company acknowledge her contribution" to the film, which has yet to occur. Salud died on October 16, 2022, aged 109.

== Stage adaptation ==
On January 24, 2023, during Epcot's annual Disney on Broadway concert, The Lion King actor L. Steven Taylor announced that a live stage adaptation of Coco is in development.

== Sequel ==
In March 2025, Disney CEO Bob Iger announced that a sequel, titled Coco 2, is in development. Unkrich and Molina are set to return in directing roles. In August 2026, it was announced that the film would be released on November 21, 2029, with Benjamin Bratt set to reprise his role as Ernesto de la Cruz.

== See also ==
- The Book of Life, a 2014 animated film featuring a Mexican-style realm of the dead.
- List of films set around Halloween
