= Anthony Gonzalez (actor) =

American actor (born 2004)

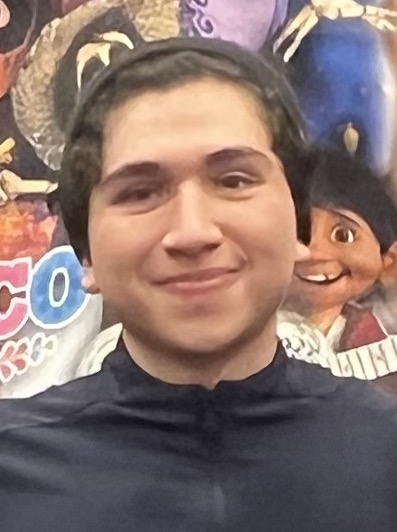
- Gonzalez in 2025
- Born: September 23, 2004 (age 22); Los Angeles, California, U.S.
- Occupation: Actor
- Years active: 2012–present

Anthony Gonzalez (born September 23, 2004) is an American actor. He has appeared in the TV series The Bridge (2014) and Criminal Minds: Beyond Borders (2017), and as the voice of Miguel in the Pixar film Coco (2017). He also provided the motion capture and voice for the character of Diego Castillo in the video game Far Cry 6 (2021).

== Career ==
Gonzalez was born in Los Angeles, California to Mexican parents. He voiced the lead character Miguel Rivera in the 2017 Pixar film Coco. Gonzalez won an Annie Award, Washington D.C. Area Film Critics Association, and Teen Choice Award for his role.

== Filmography ==
=== Film ===
Year	Title	Role	Notes
2015	Imagination of Young	Bruno	Short film
2017	Coco	Miguel Rivera (voice)	
2018	Icebox	Oscar	
2018	The Gospel Truth	Solo singer #11	
2019	Grand-Daddy Day Care	Jordan Collin	
2021	Blue Miracle	Geco	Netflix original movie
2021	Phobias	Carlos	

=== Television ===
Year	Title	Role	Notes
2013	El Factor x	Himself	
2014	The Bridge	Young boy	Episode: "Lamia"
2017	Criminal Minds: Beyond Borders	Polaroid	Episode: "The Devil's Breath".
2018	The Last Ship	Simon Barros	4 episodes
2019	Shameless	Santiago	3 episodes
2020	American Dad	Colombian Boy (voice)	1 episode

=== Video Games ===
Year	Title	Role	Notes
2021	Far Cry 6	Diego Castillo	featured voice and motion capture role

== Awards ==
Year	Association	Category	Nominated work	Result	Ref.
2017	Washington D.C. Area Film Critics Association	Best Animated Voice Performance	Coco	Won	
2018	Annie Award	Best Voice Acting in an Animated Feature Production	Coco	Won	
2018	Teen Choice Awards	Choice Fantasy Movie Actor	Coco	Won	
