= Night Vale Presents =

Podcast network

- Type: Podcast network
- Country: United States
- Availability: Global
- Founded: 2010 (Commonplace Books); 2015 (Night Vale Presents)
- Key people: Joseph Fink; Jeffrey Cranor
- Official website: nightvalepresents.com

Night Vale Presents is a production company and independent podcast network founded in 2015 by Joseph Fink and Jeffrey Cranor. The name is derived from its flagship podcast, Welcome to Night Vale, and the network is also known for publishing Alice Isn't Dead and Sleep with Me. It is the successor to Commonplace Books, a collaborative fiction group from the early 2010s, which published several books as well as early Night Vale episodes. Night Vale Presents is partnered with Public Radio Exchange.

== History ==
Night Vale Presents has its origins in a community writing project orchestrated by Joseph Fink in 2010. Commonplace Books was founded in order to put together a book based on the unfinished story ideas of HP Lovecraft. Along with Fink himself, the book's contributors included Meg Bashwinner and Jeffrey Cranor. The book, A Commonplace Book of the Weird: The Untold Stories of H.P. Lovecraft was released in October 2010. In 2012, a second collaborative book, What it Means to be a Grown-Up: The Complete and Definitive Answer followed.

The group's debut podcast, Welcome to Night Vale, launched in June 2012 and was highly successful. Initially hosting only its flagship show, the team adopted the title "Night Vale Presents" in 2015, and began to expand into a wider network with the introduction of new shows. These were sometimes hosted by existing Night Vale staff, while shows like The Orbiting Human Circus (of the Air) were created by others. Some existing shows, such as Sleep with Me which had debuted off-network were brought in part way through their run. The expansion was rapid, and by 2018 the network hosted 13 podcasts. The network also published a number of books from 2015 onwards, many of which are related to Welcome to Night Vale.

As of 2026 Night Vale Presents supports 7 active shows. They are all hosted by Welcome to Night Vale staff, with the exception of Sleep with Me.

== Network overview ==
Title	Seasons	Host/Narrator	Genre	Premiere date	Finale date
Welcome to Night Vale	13	Cecil Baldwin	Comedy drama, news satire, surrealism, horror, mystery	June 15, 2012 (Note: The show was initially published by Commonplace Books, the predecessor to Night Vale Presents)	Present
Alice Isn't Dead	3	Jasika Nicole; Erica Livingston; Roberta Colindrez	Mystery, supernatural horror, drama	March 8, 2016	August 28, 2018
The Orbiting Human Circus (of the Air)	2	Julian Koster; Drew Callander	Drama, surrealism	October 4, 2016	June 17, 2020
Within the Wires	10	Various	Science fiction, surrealism, anthology, epistolary fiction	June 21, 2016	December 16, 2025
Conversations with People who Hate Me	—N/a	Dylan Marron	Talk	July 30, 2017	April 27, 2022
It Makes a Sound	1	Jacquelyn Landgraf	Drama, mystery	September 24, 2017	February 2, 2019 (Note: The second season was not featured on Night Vale Presents, and concluded on September 25, 2022.)
I Only Listen to The Mountain Goats	2	Joseph Fink; John Darnielle	Talk, Music	September 27, 2017	November 21, 2019
Pounded in the Butt By My Own Podcast	—N/a	Chuck Tingle	Comedy, erotica	March 13, 2018	December 24, 2018
Sleep with Me	—N/a	Drew Ackerman	Comedy, health and wellness	March 28, 2018 (Note: The show debuted off-network on October 18, 2013)	Present
Good Morning Night Vale	—N/a	Meg Bashwiner; Symphony Sanders; Hal Lublin	Talk, aftershow	June 7, 2018	Present
Adventures in New America	1	Various	Science fiction, political satire, buddy comedy, Afrofuturism	September 28, 2018	June 14, 2019
Dreamboy	1	Dane Terry	Musical, mystery	October 9, 2018	March 26, 2019
Harry Potter and the Sacred Text	2	Vanessa Zoltan; Casper Ter Kuile; Matthew Potts	Talk, Spirituality, Literature	January 3, 2019 (Note: The show debuted off-network on May 19, 2016)	February 19, 2026
Start With This	—N/a	Joseph Fink; Jeffrey Cranor	Talk, literature	March 29, 2019	September 14, 2021
Our Plague Year	—N/a	Joseph Fink	Talk, Current Events	March 13, 2020	December 20, 2021
Random Number Generator Horror Podcast No. 9	—N/a	Jeffrey Cranor; Cecil Baldwin	Talk, horror	August 10, 2020	Present
Unlicensed	3	Various	Mystery, noir, drama	November 10, 2022	Present
The Best Worst	—N/a	Meg Bashwinner; Joseph Fink	Commentary	March 4, 2025	Present
Alice Isn't Dead: Don't Tell Alice	1	Jasika Nicole	Mystery, supernatural horror, drama	April 13, 2026	Present

== Current shows ==
=== The Best Worst ===
Meg Bashwinner and Joseph Fink watch the best and worst episode of a long running TV show, using IMDB ratings, and compare them.

=== Good Morning Night Vale ===
Good Morning Night Vale is an aftershow for Welcome to Night Vale featuring Night Vale voice actors Meg Bashwiner, Symphony Sanders, and Hal Lublin breaking down and discussing every episode of the show.

=== Random Number Generator Horror Podcast No. 9 ===
Random Number Generator Horror Podcast No. 9 is a horror podcast hosted by Jeffrey Cranor and Cecil Baldwin. The duo spend each episode talking about a specific horror film chosen via random dice roll. It premiered on August 10, 2020.

=== Sleep with Me ===
On March 28, 2018, Night Vale Presents added Sleep with Me to their network. The show was previously presented by "Dearest Scooter" from 2013 to 2017, and by Feral Audio from 2017 to 2018. It is a storytelling and health-based podcast hosted by creator Drew Ackerman, designed to help listeners fall asleep.

=== Within the Wires ===
The second NVP network podcast is Within the Wires is an anthology series of found audio tapes, written by Night Vale cowriter Jeffrey Cranor, as well as and Janina Matthewson. Season one is narrated by Matthewson and told as a series of relaxation tapes prepared for a patient in a mysterious medical center known as "The Institute." As the story unfolds, it became clear that the narrator of the tapes had a connection to the patient, and may have had a secret agenda. The first season of 10 episodes was released between June and November 2016. The second season, narrated by Rima Te Wiata, is presented as a series of museum audio guides and aired from September 2017, to January 2018. The third season, narrated by Lee LeBreton, is a political thriller set in 1950s Chicago told through letters from a bureaucrat to his secretary. It aired from September 2018, to January 2019. The fourth season ran from September to December 2019 and is about a mother, voiced by Mona Greene, who records audio notes to her daughter while leading an anti-government commune called The Cradle with music by Mary Epworth.

=== Welcome to Night Vale ===
The flagship show of the network and the origin of its name. It is a twice monthly podcast, in the form of community radio broadcasts for the fictional town of Night Vale. In the town's bizarre desert locale, strange and supernatural occurrences are normal. Cecil Gershwin Palmer, the host and narrator, is voiced by Cecil Baldwin. The series was created in 2012 by Joseph Fink and Jeffrey Cranor, and was published by Commonplace Books until the network was formally established in 2015.

== Completed shows ==
=== Adventures in New America (2018-2019) ===
Adventures in New America is a fiction podcast created by Stephen Winter and Tristan Cowen which premiered on September 28, 2018. It is described as "the first sci-fi, political satire, Afrofuturistic buddy comedy" podcast. It followed two African-New-American friends, the lonely curmudgeon IA, and lesbian thief Simon Carr as they partake in a series of high-stakes heists to get quick cash to pay for IA's medical treatment. It stars an ensemble cast featuring Paige Gilbert, Bryan Webster, Pernell Walker, Starlee Kine, and Stephen Winter.

=== Alice Isn't Dead (2016-2018) ===
The first NVP network podcast, Alice Isn't Dead, is written by Night Vale cowriter Joseph Fink, and was performed by Jasika Nicole, who played Dana on Night Vale. The story is presented as monologues broadcast over a trucker CB radio, as a woman named Keisha drives a truck across America, looking for her missing wife. The first season of 10 episodes was released between March and July 2016, and a second season began airing in April 2017 to August 2017. The third and final season aired from April 2018 to August 2018. A novel based on the series was released on October 30, 2018. The series is also being adapted for television.

=== Conversations with People Who Hate Me (2017-2022) ===
Night Vale Presents' first non-fiction podcast, Conversations With People Who Hate Me, premiered on July 30, 2017. It is a weekly discussion-based podcast featuring Dylan Marron talking with people who have sent him hateful comments online, or mediating conversations between others who have had arguments online including celebrity guests.

=== Dreamboy (2018-2019) ===
Dreamboy is a fiction podcast created by and starring musician Dane Terry. The first season aired from October 2018, to March 2019. The musical mystery podcast is about a "spun-out musician" and zoo employee named Dane living in Cleveland, Ohio as he attempts to solve the mystery of mysterious flickering lights across town, as well as a murderous zebra. On December 3, 2019, it was announced that there would not be another season of the podcast.

=== I Only Listen to The Mountain Goats (2017-2019) ===
I Only Listen To The Mountain Goats, features conversations between Joseph Fink and musician John Darnielle of the band The Mountain Goats. Each episode features a new cover of a Mountain Goats song by a different artist. The first season, focusing on the band's album All Hail West Texas, aired from September 27, 2017, to April 5, 2018. An album featuring all the covers from the first season was released the day after the finale digitally and on vinyl. Season two, focusing on the band's then-upcoming album In League with Dragons premiered on April 4, 2019.

=== Harry Potter and the Sacred Text (2016-2026) ===
Night Vale Presents announced in January 2019 that they had added the podcast Harry Potter and the Sacred Text, previously presented by Panoply, to the network's roster. Hosted by Vanessa Zoltan and Casper Ter Kuile, the podcast attempted to read the Harry Potter books as a sacred text, exploring the characters and context of one chapter per episode through a different central theme. The podcast concluded in February 2026 after reading through the entire series twice.

=== It Makes A Sound (2017-2019) ===
It Makes A Sound aired from September 2017 to January 2018 and detailed an amateur radio host's love of a local musician named Wim Faros and her hopes of revitalizing her hometown. The podcast was created, written, and narrated by Jacquelyn Landgraf. A soundtrack album based on the first season was released called Win Faros: The Attic Tapes was released on January 30, 2019.

=== Our Plague Year (2020-2021) ===
On March 13, 2020, a new weekly podcast created by Joseph Fink called Our Plague Year was launched with the intent to help assuage anxieties during the COVID-19 pandemic.

=== The Orbiting Human Circus (2016-2020) ===
A third NVP network podcast, The Orbiting Human Circus (of the Air), was released in collaboration with WNYC Studios, and the first Night Vale Presents podcast to be produced by somebody other than Joseph Fink or Jeffrey Cranor. This radio drama podcast is written by and stars musician Julian Koster, It depicts Koster as a shy janitor named Julian working in the Eiffel Tower, where his favorite show entitled The Orbiting Human Circus is performed. His frequent attempts to appear on the show often end in embarrassment and depression for Julian. Drew Callander voices the narrator inside Julian's head, and John Cameron Mitchell voices John Cameron, the host of The Orbiting Human Circus. The first season ran from October 2016 to May 2018. The second season ran from November 6, 2019, to March 18, 2020.

=== Pounded in the Butt by My Own Podcast (2018) ===
Pounded In The Butt By My Own Podcast premiered on March 13, 2018, and features various celebrity guests performing short stories by erotic comedy writer Chuck Tingle. It concluded on December 24, 2018.

=== Start with This (2019-2021) ===
Start With This, a non-fiction podcast by Night Vale co-creators Joseph Fink and Jeffrey Cranor, premiered on March 22, 2019. It features the duo sharing writing tips and prompts for listeners to sharpen their own writing skills. There is a forum Patreon supporters for the series in which people can share and receive feedback on their writing.

== Books ==
Commonplace Books published two of Fink's books in the early 2010s. Night Vale Presents later published a number of books, many of which are related to its flagship show.

As Commonplace Books:

- Commonplace Book of the Weird: The Untold Stories of H.P. Lovecraft (2010)
- What It Means To Be A Grown-up (2012)

As Night Vale Presents:

- Welcome to Night Vale (2015)
- Mostly Void, Partially Stars (2016)
- The Great Glowing Coils of the Universe (2016)
- It Devours! (2017)
- Alice Isn't Dead (2018)
- The Buying of Lot 37 (2019)
- Who's a Good Boy? (2019)
- The Faceless Old Woman Who Secretly Lives In Your Home (2020)
- The First 10 Years: Two Sides of the Same Love Story (2021)
- The Halloween Moon (2021)
- You Feel It Just Below the Ribs (2021)
- The Nudge (2026)
