= Te Wiata =

Te Wiata is a Māori surname that may refer to the following notable people:

- Beryl Te Wiata (1925–2017), New Zealand actor, author and scriptwriter
- Inia Te Wiata (1915–1971), New Zealand Māori bass-baritone opera singer, film actor and artist
- Rima Te Wiata (born 1963), British-born New Zealand singer, comedian and stage, film and television actress
