= Cecil Gershwin Palmer =

- Welcome to Night Vale character
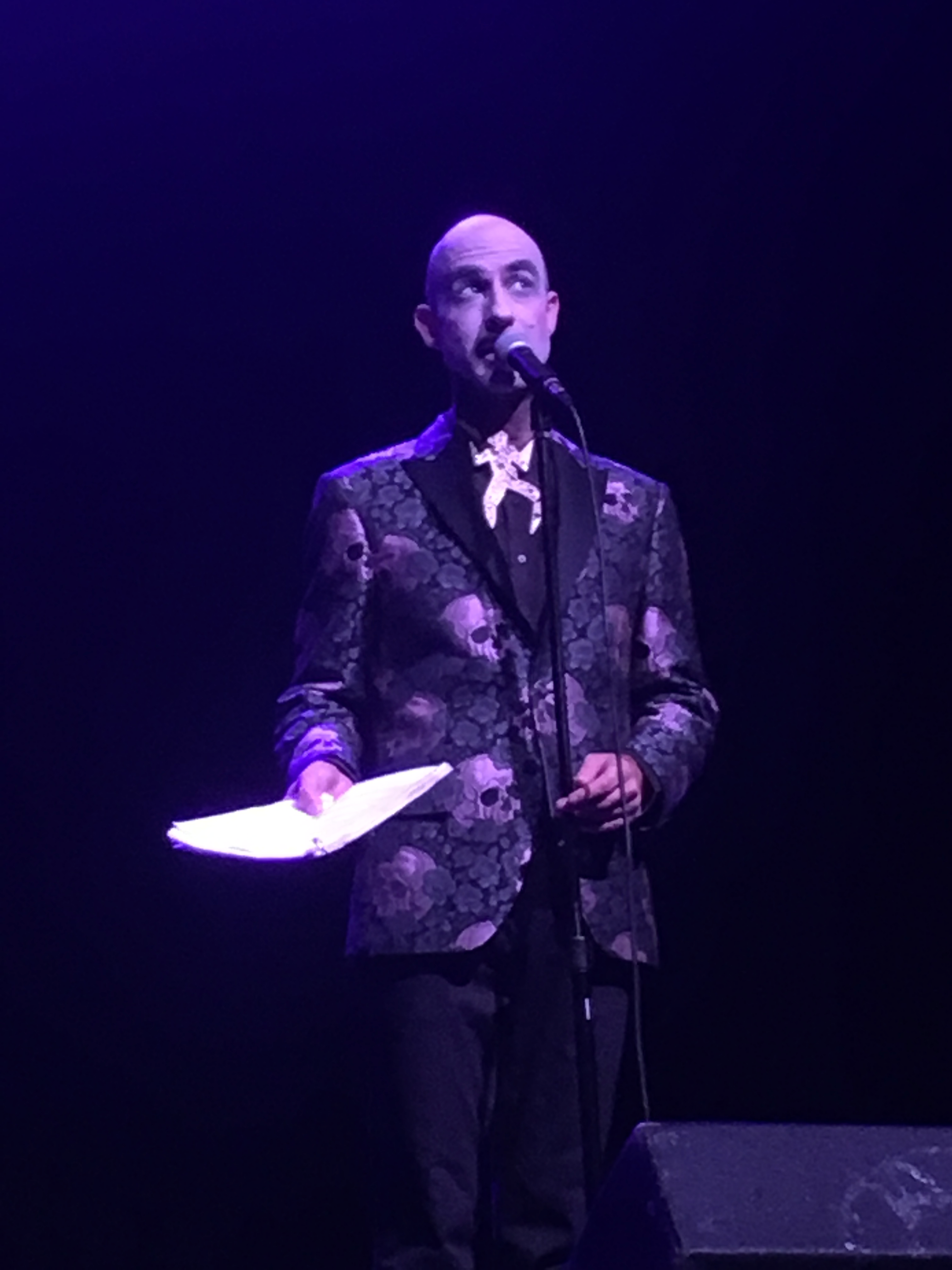
- Baldwin as Cecil in a 2018 live show
- First appearance: Pilot (June 2012)
- Created by: Joseph Fink and Jeffrey Cranor
- Voiced by: Cecil Baldwin

In-universe information
- Species: Unknown
- Position: Radio host
- Family: Janice (niece); Steve Carlsberg (brother in law); Abby Palmer (sister)
- Spouse: Carlos Robles
- Children: Esteban

Cecil Gershwin Palmer is a fictional character in the podcast Welcome to Night Vale, played by Cecil Baldwin. Within the show, Cecil works as the newscaster for the Night Vale community radio station. An unprofessional and unreliable narrator, he alternates between reading the daily news and events as prepared for him and going on tangents and asides about his personal affairs, such as his relationship with Carlos.

As the central character and principal narrator of the show, he was introduced in the 2012 pilot and appears the vast majority of episodes. He is a popular character with fans, and his relationship with Carlos the local scientist is important to many members of the Night Vale fandom. That relationship, and Cecil's status as an openly queer protagonist, has been credited with helping the show attain popularity within its fanbase. Encouraged by the creators, fans often make artwork of him, and have settled on several consistent attributes despite the near absence of any physical descriptors or depictions of him in the show.

== Role and storylines ==
In the show, Cecil Palmer works as the newscaster for the Night Vale community radio station. He directly addresses the audience and characters of the show as one and mostly reads the local news, though sometimes serves as a witness or otherwise takes parts in local happenings. He is the main character and driving voice in Night Vale; no characters apart from Cecil speak in the show until episode 16 ("Phone Call"), and he is in every episode until episode 47 ("Company Picnic"). His delivery is deadpan, sarcastic, and unprofessional. He is an unreliable narrator who leaves many things out and often interrupts his broadcasts with tangents and speeches about his personal life, such as expressions of affection for Carlos the scientist and expressions of disgust for neighboring town Desert Bluffs and his brother in law, Steve Carlsberg, for whom Cecil has an "epic dislike". These personal asides form the basis for much of the story.

Very few aspects of Cecil's physical character are revealed to the audience. He has hair and eyes, but his race and age are unknown and he is described in the show as "not too short or tall, not fat or too thin". He may or may not be human; the character does, at times, seem "telepathic and able to scry listeners’ thoughts" and is "implied to be capable of withstanding worrying amounts of radiation". In the books, Cecil is either not depicted or is heavily obscured to the point no physical characteristics can be discerned. His clothing has been described on several occasions, with the first display of Cecil's wardrobe occurring in Episode 27, "First Date", when he is depicted in his "best tunic and furry pants". He is the doppelgänger of Kevin, the radio host from Desert Bluffs, who is similarly left undescribed.

He is Jewish, which was confirmed in 2016 in a live performance and by Fink on Twitter. Cecil's sexuality is made clear to the audience from the first episode, when he professes his attraction to Carlos. Cecil's relationship with Carlos is treated as unremarkable by other characters, except for brief moments where they find their love comforting. In initial episodes, Cecil idolizes Carlos and his appearance, but comes to understand that he is "even better" as "he is imperfect". They marry in episode 100 ("Toast") and later adopt a son. He remembers very little, if anything, from his childhood. He has a sister, Abby, and a niece, Janice. One of the few things he remembers about his mother is her prophecy that he will be killed in a manner that shall "involve a mirror".

There is a lack of a "functioning time stream" in Night Vale. Cecil's first broadcast occurred before the invention of radios, when Night Vale was being colonized by white settlers. As a resident of the town, Cecil regularly experiences memory loss and experiences fictitious memories. This instability sometimes prompts existential crises. When, in episode 33 ("Cassette"), he discovers old cassette tapes he recorded as a teenager that document Cecil's life as an intern, his brother, and possibly Cecil's own death, he does not remember any of the events happening. Emotional, he destroys the tapes to allow himself to forget again.

== Character ==
=== Creation and development ===
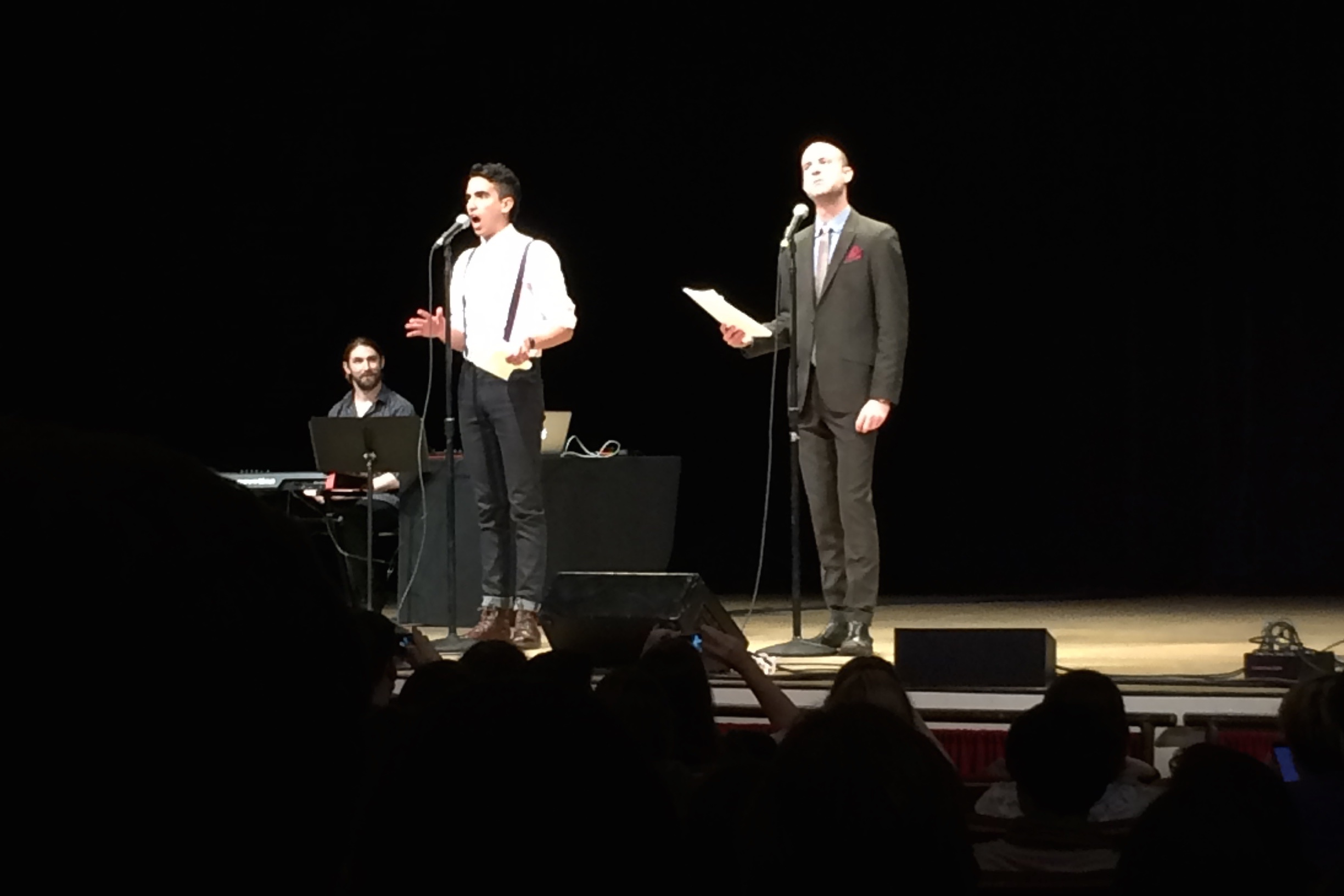
Dylan Marron (left) as Carlos and Cecil Baldwin (right) as Cecil in a 2015 live performance

While initially just the radio host who introduced the audience to the world of Night Vale and represented the town's "weird and bizarre", Cecil's personality and personal life became more prominent as the show progressed through its first several years, and he is the most developed and in-depth character in Night Vale. Most characterization is provided in the personal asides and tangents Cecil goes on during each episodes. He is openly gay, not queer coded. His sexuality was decided upon by the writers, Joseph Fink and Jeffrey Cranor, after they heard Cecil Baldwin's reading of the first episode. Baldwin himself had, upon seeing that the script called for Cecil to describe Carlos's physical appearance in a way he thought was reminiscent of a queer relationship. Before then, his crush on and relationship with Carlos were not planned to be a central theme.

Cecil is listed in the credits as the "Voice of Nightvale". He was not given a name until several episodes had aired and the creators and Baldwin realized that fans were "confused as to whether [Baldwin] was a character or an actor"; they selected the name Cecil "to just confuse them more". He was given the last name "Palmer" in late 2013, after the screenwriters and Baldwin discovered that the fictional Cecil outranked the real Baldwin in Google search results. The name itself is a reference to the American drama Twin Peaks, which has characters Laura and Leland Palmer.

His physical appearance, like the appearance of many Night Vale characters, was intentionally left ambiguous by Fink and Cranor. According to Fink, he believes that it was "not really what’s important in [the] show".

Cecil does not have a prominent role in the Welcome to Night Vale novel, though several of his monologues are included.

=== Voice and delivery ===
The character of Cecil is voiced by Cecil Baldwin, and his vocal performance is a major part of the character. Cecil, like Baldwin, has a deep "radio announcer" voice, which is what led to Baldwin's initial casting. Cecil the character is read in an authoritative manner; this contrasts with the weirdness of Night Vale and creates a comedy air within parts in the show, yet also a feeling a nostalgia for the audience. The story is presented with some distance between Cecil and the plot; he is often reading from a script or recounting earlier events, which places distance between the reader and the events. However, some stories are presented as if they were live. During these segments, which are typically more urgent and dangerous, Cecil becomes more emotional and less filtered.

Most of the show is recorded at Baldwin's home studio, and segments requiring interaction with other characters are recorded with the use of Skype. Baldwin also performs the character during the Welcome to Night Vale live shows, standing in front of a microphone with a script. He directly interacts with the audience, addressing them as members of the Night Vale community and using roleplay and call and response segments.

== Reception ==
=== Fandom ===
Cecil is a popular character within the Night Vale fandom; in particular, his relationship with Carlos is often discussed by fans and most fan art focuses on the two. The show experienced an increased number of downloads after the episodes where Cecil and Carlos began dating, and Cranor has attributed much of the show's popularity to the pairing. The fact that Cecil was an openly queer protagonist, uncommon at the time, made him popular on sites like Tumblr. This popularity lasted even after the peak of the show; a 2023 user-run poll on the platform declared him to be the paramount Tumblr Sexyman. More generally, he was described by Wired as being "at the heart of [Night Vale’s] enduring appeal" to fans, and the Journal of Radio & Audio Media said that Cecil's delivery of the script, or more specifically, the parts where he broke away from the script, "endear[ed]" him to the audience and, like real talk radio, allowed for the audience to grow closer to him.

=== Fan depictions ===
Fink and Cranor encourage the creation of fan art of the character. Few aspects of Cecil's physical appearance are revealed to the audience and, due to this absence of canon descriptions, many fan artists look to each other's work to create an image of him. Fan art of Cecil has a tendency to be incredibly consistent. Artists often depict Cecil with similar attributes; he is white, wears glasses, and, contrary to the show, is a good dresser who wears sweater vests, suspenders, and some form of tie. He very often has a third eye. His eyes are commonly purple or black, and he may have sharpened teeth or tentacles. Fan art frequently shows him with tattoos that are often of purple eyes and that may look like "tribal and cult" tattoos. His hair is commonly blonde, but that is not as consistent as other traits. Fan art sometimes follows Baldwin's appearance, but mostly follows the preset fan-created Cecil. Not all art depicts Cecil has a human or humanoid character, however. According to Baldwin, he once saw a piece depicting Cecil as a moth.

Cecil is also frequently depicted as an able-bodied white man; this has caused contention within the fandom. An argument embraced by some fans is that all headcanons of Cecil are true, no matter which race they are, because there is no evidence to contradict them. Other fans find the fact that he is disproportionately depicted in such a manner is evidence that the fandom prioritizes white characters. The common fan imagining of Cecil has led to Cecil's doppelganger, Kevin, who is voiced by African American actor Kevin R. Free, being drawn as white as well. In The Iconography of Fanart, EJ Nielsen argued that drawing Kevin as white could be seen as whitewashing within the fandom. Drawings depicting Cecil as non-white do exist and are looked on favorably by Baldwin. According to one fan on Reddit c. 2014, “the Cecils [in fanart] slowly evolve[d]" as the series progressed, and they noted an increase in the overall number of "Cecils of color" being created.

=== Critical reception and analysis ===
In Critical Approaches to Welcome to Night Vale, in reference to Cecil's openness and his relationship with Carlos, and the town's nonplussed reaction, Stobbart described it as "refreshing and heartening for a work of fiction to display a society where homophobia seemingly does not exist".

A Berkeley Technology Law Journal article argued that Cecil, through his online popularity, had likely "attained the characterization and the cultural and economic value" needed to be considered copyrightable in the US as laid out by DC Comics v. Mark Towle, but said it was "unclear" whether Cecil had enough of a physical presence needed to qualify for protection.

In the 2014 and 2015 Audio Verse Awards, Baldwin won "Best Actor in an Original Leading Role" and "Best Actor with a Leading Role in an Original, Long-Form, Serial Production" for his role as Cecil.
