= Sleep with Me (podcast) =

Health and wellness podcast

- Genre: Health, Comedy
- Format: Storytelling
- Language: English

Creative team
- Created by: Drew Ackerman

Cast and voices
- Starring: "Dearest Scooter"

Music
- Theme music composed by: Christopher Postill

Production
- Length: c. 60 minutes

Publication
- No. of episodes: 1,000+
- Original release: October 18, 2013
- Provider: Night Vale Presents
- Updates: Sunday, Wednesday

Related
- Related shows: Sleep to Strange, Game of Drones
- Website: http://www.sleepwithmepodcast.com

Sleep with Me is a twice-weekly podcast that began on October 18, 2013. It is hosted by "Dearest Scooter" as performed by Drew Ackerman. Sleep with Me joined the Feral Audio podcast network in February 2017 and moved to Night Vale Presents on March 28, 2018. The podcast's tagline is "The podcast that puts you to sleep".

== Premise and influences ==
Sleep with Me is meant to distract listeners, keeping their minds occupied when they experience insomnia, while gently lulling them to sleep.

Ackerman is open about his own struggles with insomnia; he has said that his rambling storytelling style began in childhood, when he told his brothers boring bedtime stories when they could not sleep. He names The Dr. Demento Show, Kurt Vonnegut and the Beastie Boys as some of his influences. Ackerman describes his storytelling style as "the good type of weird but not creepy". He does not claim to have expertise in psychology or sleep science, and he relies on feedback from listeners to shape the podcast.

== Format and structure ==
Each episode begins with Ackerman, in character as "Dearest Scooter", introducing the podcast. He then mentions the episode's sponsors; singer-songwriter Jonathan Mann, also known as the "Mystery Bard", often sings a "lullaby" jingle about one of the sponsoring companies. Scooter continues with a rambling introduction for a few minutes before moving on to the episode's main story. Each episode ends with Scooter individually thanking listeners who have recently donated to the show or contacted him on social media.

Ackerman also maintains a separate podcast playlist of older episodes, called Sleep to Strange, that have had the introductions removed so listeners can listen to just the main story.

== Reactions and response ==
Sleep with Me has largely gained listeners through word of mouth and Ackerman's Twitter account.

In January 2017, the podcast had reached 2.3 million monthly downloads.

Drew Ackerman and Sleep with Me were featured on the October 20, 2016, episode of The Dr. Oz Show, entitled "Sleep Brain Connection".

In 2016, Sleep with Me won the People's Choice Podcast Award for Best Health Podcast.

Both Sleep with Me and its spinoff Game of Drones appeared on the Mental Floss list of "10 Podcasts to Help You Sleep".

Sleep with Me has been ranked as one of the top 50 most popular podcasts.

Esquire named Sleep with Me one of The 25 Essential Podcasts of 2016.

The show won Best Health & Fitness Podcast at the 2019 iHeartRadio Podcast Awards.

In 2025, Sleep with Me has been struggling financially and was largely unsuccessful in attracting enough listeners to its premium paid subscription despite repeated efforts by Ackerman urging listeners to subscribe or he would need to step away from the show due to it being unsustainable.

== Recurring stories, characters and themes ==
- After the Glass Slipper - "The story of Cinderella, her Fairy Godmother and her Stepmother after she became a princess."
- Bernie the Butterfly - "Bernie the Butterfly stops by the studio to set the record straight. He has a ton of stuff he needs to get off his chest. Who knew that there was so much repressed rage against humans."
- Big Farm P.I. - "This won't be your garden variety investigation, it will have more meanders."
- Claude Neon Reports - "Correspondent Claude Neon reports on the whereabouts of the new 'Santa', Roberta Claus."
- Dreaming of Newhart - Recaps episodes of Newhart and The Bob Newhart Show. Inspired by the twist ending of Newhart, each episode sees Bob talking to his therapist about his week (recapping an episode of The Bob Newhart Show) and talking about one of his recent dreams (recapping an episode of Newhart).
- Game of Drones - Recaps Game of Thrones; also available as a separate podcast feed.
- Get Besos - Tells the fictional story of Richard Warren Sears and James Cash Penney, who return from limbo to take revenge on internet retailer "Jiff Besos".
- Great British Bake You Off to Sleep - Scooter recaps episodes of The Great British Bake Off.
- Lady Witchbeard - Recounts the story of Scooter's friend, the pirate witch Lady Witchbeard.
- Metastasnooze - Recaps Metástasis, the Spanish-language version of Breaking Bad.
- Nuns in Space - "An episodic series so you can start anywhere and be taken away to dreamland."
- Otter Things - A more family-friendly re-telling of the series Stranger Things set in a swamp in the early 90's, with all the characters re-imagined as "swamp-based beings" such as otters, frogs, beavers, porcupines, and muskrats. Told by the 8th-grader Emma Otter, niece to the famous musician Emmet Otter.
- Ray Perkins - "A sweet upbeat old man" who talks about his visits to Disney parks and other Florida attractions.
- Real Time Recipes - "Fall asleep and learn to cook at the same time."
- Sleep with TNG - Recaps Star Trek: The Next Generation.
- Superdull - A superhero story.
- The Good Place - Scooter goes through each episode in detail.
- The Adventures of Dr. Triangle and Isosceles - A post-apocalyptic fantasy series. Set in a "post-math world" under the influence of the dark goddess Discordia, the series stars two heroic, satirical performers and their mule, who wander the Midwest on a crusade to "restore the principles of mathematics" in the name of Seshat, goddess of math.
- Trending Tuesdays - Scooter develops a story based on Twitter's trending topics.
- Doctor Who - Many episodes feature recaps of Doctor Who stories, sometimes with slightly spoofed titles such a "The Girl in the Franceplace."
- Mandaborian on Mandelorian - Recap of The Mandalorian

== See also ==
- List of health and wellness podcasts
- List of psychology and self-help podcasts
