= Mary Epworth =

English singer-songwriter

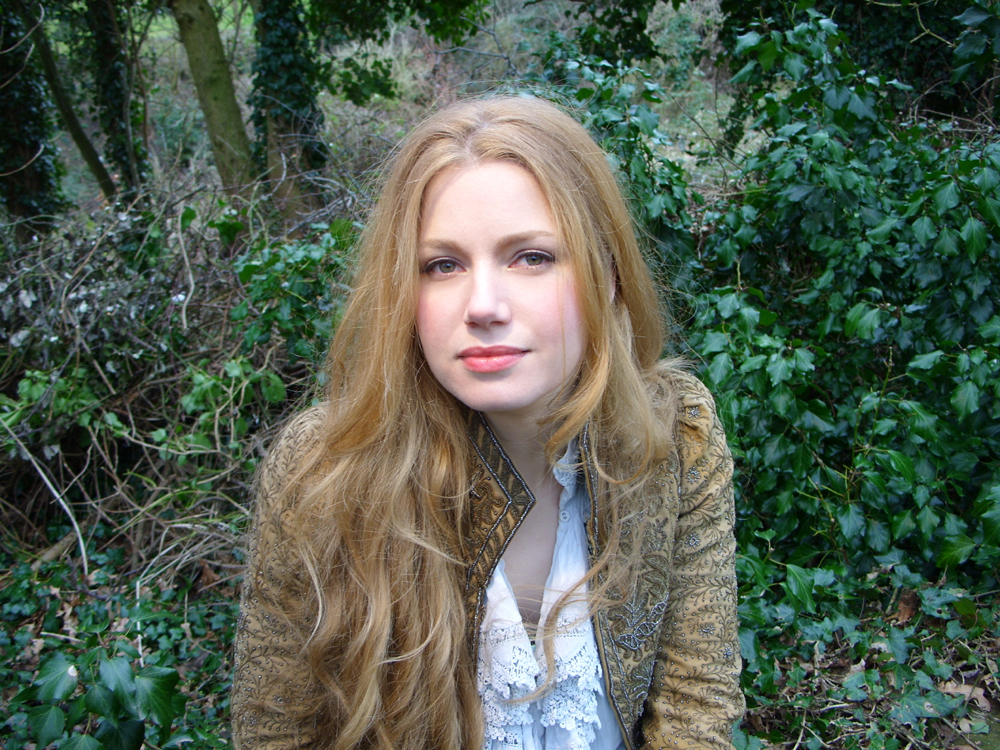
Epworth in 2009

Mary Epworth is an English singer, songwriter, and composer. In 2012, Epworth unveiled her debut album, Dream Life, receiving significant radio backing. Singles such as "Black Doe" and "Long Gone" were featured on BBC Radio 6 Music playlists, with "Black Doe" selected as Zane Lowe's Hottest Record in the World on BBC Radio 1.

== Career ==
In 2008, Epworth introduced her debut single "The Saddle Song" on 7. It garnered recognition by being featured in a top 100 poll conducted by readers of German Rolling Stone magazine. Additionally, she participated in "The Lady: A Tribute to Sandy Denny" concert at Southbank Centre, where she was supported by Bellowhead. The event also featured performances by Marc Almond, Jim Moray, Dave Swarbrick, and PP Arnold.

In 2009, Epworth participated in a St. George's Day celebration concert at Cecil Sharp House and also performed at the Camden Crawl. She was interviewed by Tom Cox for The Sunday Times on August 2, 2009. Additionally, she released her second single, "Black Doe," on Hand of Glory Records.

Her debut album, Dream Life, was released in June 2012, once again under Hand of Glory Records in the UK. It earned the singer-songwriter exposure on BBC 6 Music and Radio 1, along with performances at Bristol Ladyfest, Hop Farm Festival, and Bestival in the same year. The album was subsequently released by Highline Records in North America in the spring of 2015.

Her brother, Paul Epworth, is a music producer, musician, and songwriter.

In 2013, Epworth released a one-off single titled "September," accompanied by a music video. The single debuted on August 22, 2013, on BBC Radio 6 Music during the Radcliffe and Maconie show, with Epworth as a studio guest for an interview. Subsequently, the single was included in the BBC Radio 6 Music playlist, and Epworth performed live in session with Lauren Laverne on September 30.

In 2014, Epworth undertook a 20-date UK and European tour in support of the US podcast phenomenon Welcome to Night Vale for their stage show. During the tour, Epworth also joined them onstage. The tour featured four shows in London, including two at Union Chapel and two at Shepherd's Bush Empire. Subsequently, in 2015, Epworth embarked on a 36-date US tour with Welcome to Night Vale.

In 2014, Mary Epworth participated in a unique collaboration curated by Steve Levine. This collaboration featured Epworth alongside Boy George, Bernard Butler, Tim Burgess, Mark King, Hollie Cook, and Natalie McCool. The event, known as Steve Levine's Assembly Point Sessions, occurred at St George's Hall as part of the Liverpool International Music Festival. BBC Radio 6 Music's Chris Hawkins hosted the event.

In the 2014 Christmas compilation album Christmas Joy in Full Measure, Epworth's track "The Wolf and the Woods" serves as the opening track. Other contributors to the album include Young Knives, The Webb Brothers, and Kiran Leonard. The album received a rating of 8/10 from NME. Epworth, along with Young Knives and Kiran Leonard, were featured as special guests on BBC Radio 6 Music's Radcliffe and Maconie show on New Year's Eve.

In 2016, Epworth composed the score for the podcast Within the Wires, created by the team behind Welcome to Night Vale and Alice Isn't Dead.

In September 2016, Epworth was selected by Tony Visconti as the inaugural artist to record at Visconti Studio, a newly established facility at Kingston University London.

In February 2017, Rob da Bank's record label Sunday Best announced the signing of Mary Epworth, with plans to release her second album later that year.

== Discography ==
=== Singles ===
- "The Saddle Song" (2008)
- "Black Doe" (2009)
- "September" (2013)
- "Snow Queen" (2014)
- "Me Swimming" (2017)
- "Surprise Yourself" (2017)

=== Albums ===
- Dream Life (2012 UK / 2015 USA)
- Elytral (2017)

=== Compilations ===
- Christmas Joy In Full Measure (2014) – The Wolf And The Woods
