= ESW =

ESW can mean:

== Technology ==
- Embedded software, software integral to a device
- Electroslag welding, a single-pass welding process
- esw, an Asendia software brand

== Other uses ==
- Empire State Wrestling, predecessor of NWA Empire, New York, United States
- Engineers for a Sustainable World, an American non-profit
- Every Single Word, a YouTube channel and Tumblr blog
