= Tumblr Sexyman =

Fictional character that gains popularity as a sex symbol

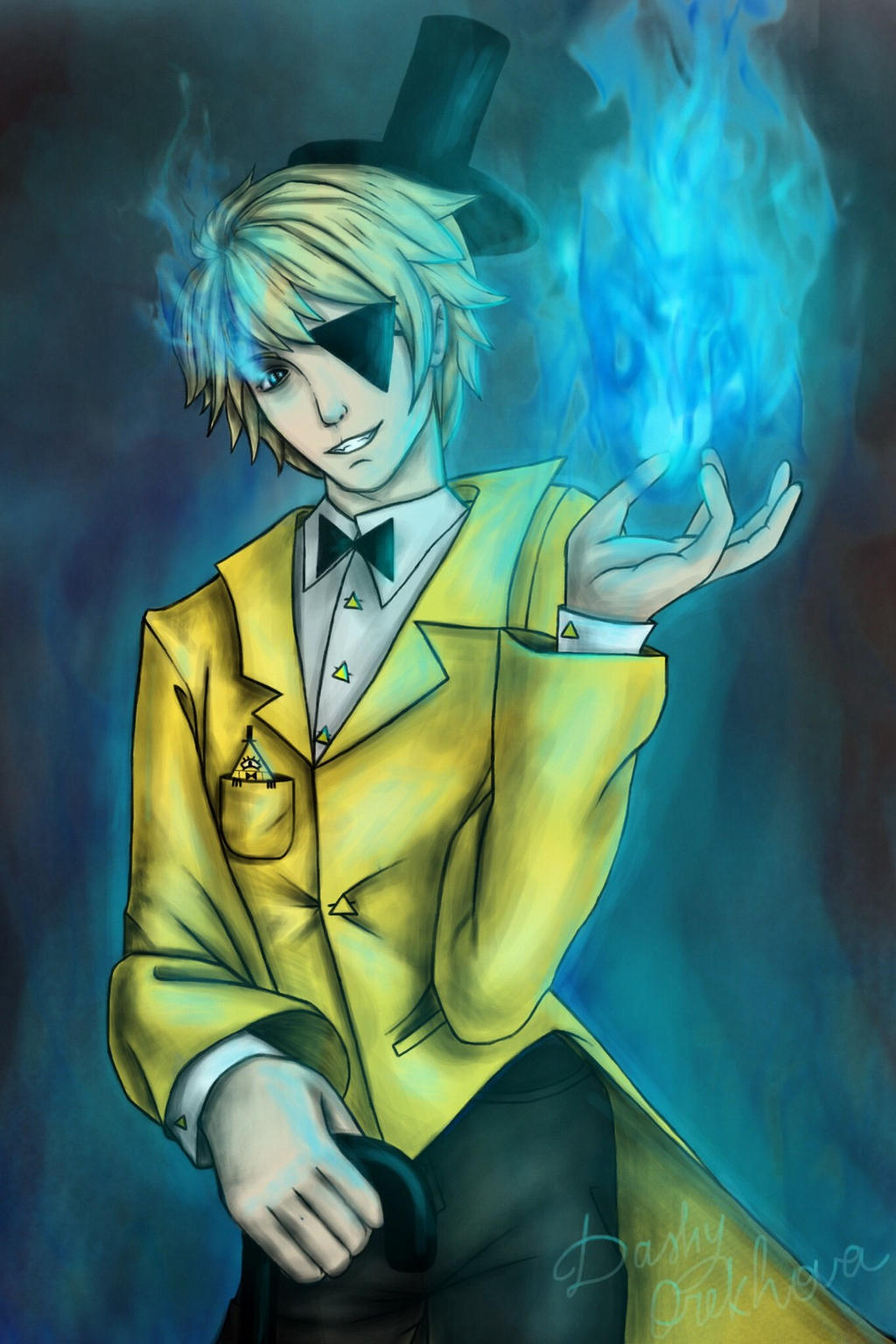
Tumblr Sexymen are often depicted as skinny men ("twinks") in fan art, even in cases where the character is not originally human, such as this fan art depicting Bill Cipher from Gravity Falls.

In online fandom culture, a Tumblr Sexyman is a fictional character that unexpectedly gains wide online popularity as a sex symbol. Tumblr Sexymen are typically unique or "quirky" male characters, often villains, who are not conventionally appealing or even human. The phenomenon is named after the website Tumblr, although Tumblr Sexymen may also be popular on other social media platforms like Twitter and TikTok.

== Definition ==
Tumblr Sexymen vary greatly, although they generally are evil or otherwise have some sort of quirk that separates them from "normal" characters. They are typically a popular subject of fan art and shipping, with fan art often depicting them in the form of skinny white men, even in cases where the character is not originally human. Isaiah Colbert from Kotaku described Tumblr Sexymen as typically having "a bean sprout physique" and "a theater kid's bravado", while Ty Galiz-Rowe from Gayming Magazine said that they are "usually tall, white looking, dress well, and have a dark or evil side to them".

The most commonly agreed upon criterion for a Tumblr Sexyman is a large and vocal fan following, with some characters failing to be considered Sexymen due to having smaller fandoms. Adam Bumas of Wired called the Sexyman "a way to think about discrete fan communities as linked, part of a greater cultural movement".

== History ==
The concept of Tumblr Sexymen originated around 2012, with the release of The Lorax. The central character of the film, the Once-ler, gained a substantial fandom, with multiple blogs being created that were dedicated to the character. The Once-ler was also the subject of a large amount of fan art and shipping, a pattern that would continue for other Tumblr Sexymen. In addition, fans began to create alternative versions of the Once-ler and to combine these versions into ships; this phenomenon was known as "Oncest". Tumblr Sexymen such as the Once-ler are especially popular among the LGBTQ community.

In 2022, a tournament was held on Twitter to determine the most popular Tumblr Sexyman. The poll went viral, and received over 244,000 votes in total. The poll ended on September 8, 2022, the same day as the death of Elizabeth II, leading to memes which associated the two events with each other. In the final round of voting, Sans from Undertale had faced Arataka Reigen from Mob Psycho 100; Sans won the poll with 50.1% of the votes. Sans's win was followed by a massive influx of fan art and memes on both Twitter and Tumblr. In response to the event, Undertale creator Toby Fox wrote a fictional account which featured imagined details of Sans's victory.

In January 2023, the rollout of a new polling feature allowed Tumblr to host its own Tumblr Sexyman competition, in which Cecil Gershwin Palmer of the Welcome to Night Vale podcast beat Sans to become the ultimate "Tumblr Tumblr Sexyman".

In 2026, the three finalists of the year's Tumblr Sexyman contest were Senshi from Dungeon Meshi, Ryland Grace from Project Hail Mary, and Mr. Ant Tenna from Deltarune. The final contest received over 300,000 votes, and Mr. Ant Tenna was crowned the winner with 39.5% of the vote. Following Tenna's victory, Toby Fox wrote a fan fiction, similar to his response to the 2022 contest. It features the contest finalists, as well as the Dungeon Meshi main cast disguised as Deltarune characters (except Chilchuck) interacting with Tenna.

== See also ==
- Fictosexuality – Attraction to fictional characters
- Nijikon – Attraction to two-dimensional characters
- Rule 34 – Internet slang regarding pornography
- Waifu – Fictional character that one feels attraction to
