= Adventures in New America =

Fiction podcasts

Adventures In New America
- Genre: Afrofuturist
- Country of origin: United States
- Language: English

Creative team
- Created by: Stephen Winter; Tristan Cowen

Cast and voices
- Hosted by: Night Vale Presents

Publication
- No. of episodes: 20
- Original release: September 28, 2018 – 2019

Reception
- Ratings: 3.9411764705882355/5

Adventures In New America is an afrofuturist podcast produced by Night Vale Presents and created by Stephen Winter and Tristan Cowen that premiered on September 28, 2018.

== Background ==
The podcast was originally intended to be released in the spring of 2018. The podcast debuted on September 28, 2018. The podcast is produced by Night Vale Presents. The show was created by Stephen Winter and Tristan Cowen. The main characters are IA Olivier played by Stephen Winter and Simon Carr played by Paige Gilbert. There were plans for a second season. The podcast explores real world societal problems like racism. The New York Times compared the show to Sorry to Bother You. The podcast is an afrofuturist podcast. The podcast was nominated for best writing in the 2019 Webby Awards.
