= Within the Wires =

Science fiction anthology podcast

- Format: Surrealism, science fiction, anthology, epistolary fiction
- Language: English

Cast and voices
- Starring: Janina Matthewson (S1); Rima Te Wiata (S2); Lee LeBreton (S3); Mona Grenne (S4); Amiera Darwish (S5); Leah Minto (S6); April Ortiz (S7); Joey Rizzolo (S8); Robin Virginie (S9); Meg Bashwiner (S10); Jeffrey Cranor (Black Box)

Publication
- No. of episodes: 100 (plus 11 bonus episodes)
- Original release: June 21, 2016

Related
- Website: www.nightvalepresents.com/withinthewires/

Within the Wires is a science fiction anthology podcast created by Jeffrey Cranor and Janina Matthewson. Set in a dystopian society in an alternate history, it is presented as in-universe audio files such as relaxation cassette tapes or museum audio guides. Each season follows a new storyline and characters, all set in the same world.

The series has been produced by Night Vale Presents since 2016. For its first five seasons, the podcast aired bi-weekly, but changed to a weekly release starting with Season 6. Cranor and Matthewson have written every episode, as well as the novel You Feel It Just Below the Ribs (2021), which is set in the podcast's universe.

== Production ==
In an interview with CBC Radio's Podcast Playlist, Jeffrey Cranor explained that the initial idea behind the podcast was to use pre-existing audio guides as a template for storytelling, with the first season taking the form of a relaxation cassette program. Cranor had read and enjoyed Janina Matthewson's book Of Things Gone Astray, and they first met when he messaged her on Twitter in Autumn 2015 to invite her to a Welcome to Night Vale live show when it was touring through London. Cranor later pitched the initial idea to Matthewson and they began brainstorming story ideas together. Each episode is outlined by Cranor and Matthewson, before being written by one of them and then edited by the other. Every season is written by Cranor and Matthewson, with music by Mary Epworth. From season 4 onwards, Cranor and Matthewson also became the producer and director, respectively. The first season was partially funded through sponsored advertising.

With the release of the final episode of the first season, it was announced that those who donate $50 or more to the podcast would receive an exclusive prologue episode for the second season, which was released on August 22, 2017. After the launch of the podcast's Patreon, the prologue episode was included in the same tier as the bonus Black Box episodes.

== Episodes ==
Every episode is written by podcast creators Jeffrey Cranor and Janina Matthewson.

=== Season 1: "Relaxation Cassettes" ===
In the first season, the listener, a medical inmate at a place called the Institute, receives guidance from the mysterious narrator of instructional relaxation cassettes.

No.	Title	Running time	Original release date
1	"Cassette 1: Stress, Shoulders"	24:11	June 21, 2016
SIDE A: Weight of the World. SIDE B: Shoulders and Giants.
2	"Cassette 2: Anxiety, Stomach"	22:28	July 5, 2016
SIDE A: Calming anxiety. SIDE B: Turning the Stomach.
3	"Cassette 3: Insomnia, Feet"	28:18	July 19, 2016
SIDE A: Plant Your Feet, Wanderer. SIDE B: Sleep On It.
4	"Cassette 4: Sadness, Lungs"	26:06	August 2, 2016
SIDE A: The Air in Here. SIDE B: The Confines of Freedom.
5	"Cassette 5: Focus, Nose"	29:30	August 16, 2016
SIDE A: I am a Camera. SIDE B: A Nose is a Nose is a Nose.
6	"Cassette 6: for Oleta"	25:04	August 30, 2016
SIDE A: The Past. SIDE B: The Future.
7	"Cassette 7: Doubt, Head"	28:03	September 13, 2016
SIDE A: Shadow of Doubt. SIDE B: Keep Your Head About You.
8	"Cassette 8: Awareness, Eyes"	26:14	September 27, 2016
SIDE A: All Eyes On You. SIDE B: The Likeness of Strangers.
9	"Cassette 9: Loss, Hands"	26:19	October 11, 2016
SIDE A: In the Calm of your Hands. SIDE B: Cut Your Losses.
10	"Cassette 10: Horopito"	26:16	October 25, 2016
Somewhere else.

=== Season 2: "Museum Audio Tours" ===
In the second season, an artist named Roimata Mangakāhia communicates with the listener through a series of museum audio guides. Every episode in this season features a guest star voicing the curator of the museum. Prior to the season premiere, three trailers composed of preview segments from the season itself were released, on August 15, August 22, and August 29, 2017. Donors of $50 or more to the production of the second season received a special prologue episode, "Cassette 0: Karikari Contemporary (1969)", on August 22, 2017, with the release of the second trailer.

No.	Title	Running time	Original release date
11	"Cassette 1: Tate Modern (1971)"	29:40	September 5, 2017
Still Life with Orchid; House with Yellow Door; The Charcoal Dish; Woman in Bath; Self Portrait with Cat. Featuring Mary Epworth as Fiona Williamson.
12	"Cassette 2: Ulster Museum (1973)"	26:17	September 19, 2017
Still Life with Tomato Plant and Sword, oil on canvas, 1962; Marketplace, Summer Afternoon, 1965; Stapler (1968); Fingers. Together. (1967); Sunshine Afternoon (1968); Self-Portrait with Cat (1972, unfinished). Featuring Sarah Maria Griffin as Mary Breathnach.
13	"Cassette 3: El Museo de Arte Contemporaneo (1974)"	55:00 (Note: Packaged together with an episode of It Makes a Sound.)	October 3, 2017
A Palace Removed; The Parade in Paris; The Arising. Featuring Anairis Quiñones as Caty Velasquez.
14	"Cassette 4: Bardo Museum (1975)"	25:14	October 17, 2017
untitled figure with hat; untitled automobile with driver; untitled waves; untitled dinner party; untitled artists at work; untitled rope and parrot. Featuring Felicity Crentsil as Ama Cudjoe.
15	"Cassette 5: Van Gogh Museum (1977)"	26:34	October 31, 2017
Childhood Home, 1935; Childhood Home, Left; New Environments; Self-Portraits Sketchbook. Featuring Lia Albers as Lia Bakker.
16	"Cassette 6: Montreal Museum of Fine Arts (1978)"	30:40	November 14, 2017
Mantis on Branch; Rubbish #3; Rubbish #7; Rubbish #15; Needlework; Housefly; Darkened Room; Guests. Featuring Kate Leth as Zoe Tremblay.
17	"Cassette 7: Sree Chitra Art Gallery (1979)"	21:05	November 28, 2017
Women Alone, by Vanessa Nguyen; Self Portrait, by Roimata Mangakāhia; The Three Sisters, by Claudia Atieno. Featuring Lily Potkin as Clarissa Nair.
18	"Cassette 8: Ohara Museum of Art (1980)"	28:39	December 12, 2017
Stars (oil on canvas); Attentiveness (oil on canvas); Sunglasses and Cigarettes (pencil sketch on paper); Lamp (oil on wood); Box of Acorns (acrylic box, acorns); Eleven. Featuring Julia Morizawa as Leah Akane.
19	"Cassette 9: Metropolitan Museum of Art (1981)"	19:58	December 26, 2017
House with Yellow Door; Woman in Bath; The Empty Pier; Unfinished Work. Featuring Leah Nanako Winkler as Elaine Hara.
20	"Cassette 10: Karikari Contemporary Gallery (1986)"	26:39	January 9, 2018
Early sketches (1953-1958); Providence (1964); Cornwall Cliffs (1972); Fingers Together, 1973; The Bodies, 1979; Self Portrait (1970); Claudia Atieno with Cat, 1974; Horopito #2, Horopito #4. Featuring Janina Matthewson as Hester Wells.

=== Season 3: "Dictation" ===
The third season, "a political thriller set in 1950s Chicago," is narrated by the bureaucrat Michael Witten; listeners access letters and notes dictated to his secretary.

No.	Title	Running time	Original release date
21	"Reel 1: July 3, 1953."	18:45	September 4, 2018
Letters to Sima Choudary, Helena Wood, and Bernice Jones.
22	"Reel 2: August 23, 1953."	19:40	September 17, 2018
Letters to Ursula Lindholm, Bernice Jones, and Vishwathy Ramadoss.
23	"Reel 3: November 26, 1953."	16:59	October 1, 2018
Letters to Sarah Chisholm and Reina Bachelor.
24	"Reel 4: February 15, 1954."	19:01	October 16, 2018
Letters to Vishwathi Ramadoss, Leena Mäkinen, and Bernice Jones.
25	"Reel 5: March 2, 1954."	18:45	October 30, 2018
Letter to Sarah Chisholm.
26	"Reel 6: March 24, 1954."	18:10	November 13, 2018
For Amy.
27	"Reel 7: March 29, 1954."	19:36	November 27, 2018
Letters to Vishwathi Ramadoss and Karen Roberts.
28	"Reel 8: April 20, 1954."	17:55	December 11, 2018
Letters to Bernice Jones and Sima Choudary.
29	"Reel 9: September 13, 1954."	24:02	January 1, 2019
Letters to Alejandra Reagan, Ursula Lindholm, Bernice Jones, and Sarah Chisholm.
30	"Reel 10: June 21, 1961."	24:01	January 15, 2019
Letter to Amy Castillo.

=== Season 4: "The Cradle" ===
Season Four, "The Cradle," is a story about a mother and daughter as they attempt to lead a family-centric commune surviving on the fringes of society. The leader of The Cradle — an anti-government commune hidden deep in a Scandinavian forest — escapes arrest and travels the globe to build her following. This 10-episode season is told via tape recorded letters home to her daughter and sermons to the commune.

No.	Title	Running time	Original release date
31	"Cassette 1: Spring 1993."	22:03	September 9, 2019
SIDE A: A letter for my daughter, Sigrid. SIDE B: Notes for the Cradle.
32	"Cassette 2: Autumn 1993."	22:29	September 9, 2019
SIDE A: Dearest Sigrid. SIDE B: Inspirational tale for the Cradle.
33	"Cassette 3: Summer 1994."	21:01	September 23, 2019
SIDE A: A story for Sigrid. SIDE B: A blessing for the Cradle.
34	"Cassette 4: Winter 1994–95."	21:47	October 7, 2019
SIDE A: Sigrid, a visitor is coming. SIDE B: A mantra for the Cradle.
35	"Cassette 5: Spring 1995."	24:01	October 21, 2019
SIDE A: Sigrid, I'm disappointed. SIDE B: A lesson of acceptance for the Cradle.
36	"Cassette 6: Summer 1996."	24:19	November 4, 2019
SIDE A: Great news, Sigrid! SIDE B: A parable from The Hand.
37	"Cassette 7: Spring 1997."	20:15	November 18, 2019
SIDE A: Motherhood is difficult, Sigrid. SIDE B: A sermon for the Cradle.
38	"Cassette 8: Winter 1997–98."	24:22	December 2, 2019
SIDE A: Keep your eyes open, Sigrid. SIDE B: A homily on readiness.
39	"Cassette 9: Autumn 1998."	19:55	December 16, 2019
SIDE A: Stay focused, Sigrid. SIDE B: You must believe in me, my Cradle.
40	"Cassette 10: Autumn 1999."	26:10	December 30, 2019
SIDE A: I love you, my glorious daughter, Sigrid. SIDE B: I love you all, my faithful Cradle.

=== Season 5: "Voicemail" ===
As well as the main narrator voiced by Amiera Darwish, this season featured a secondary narrator voiced by Norma Butikofer at the end of every episode.

No.	Title	Running time	Original release date
41	"Episode 1: March 2008."	23:16	August 25, 2020
Voicemails to Nan. Voicemail from Gwen.
42	"Episode 2: September 2003."	18:38	September 8, 2020
Voicemails to Artie, Rachel, Beverly, and Nan. Voicemail from Gwen.
43	"Episode 3: March 2002."	21:37	September 22, 2020
Voicemails to Nan. Voicemail from Gwen.
44	"Episode 4: January 2002."	20:46	October 6, 2020
Voicemails to Nan, Liv, and Chunhua. Voicemail from Gwen.
45	"Episode 5: September 2001."	17:46	October 20, 2020
Voicemails to Nan and Sophie. Voicemail from Gwen.
46	"Episode 6: July 1999."	16:01	November 3, 2020
Voicemails to Nan and Chunhua. Voicemail from Gwen.
47	"Episode 7: October 1997."	19:33	November 17, 2020
Voicemails to Nan, Sophie, and Chunhua. Voicemail from Gwen.
48	"Episode 8: July 1997."	19:14	December 1, 2020
Voicemails to Nan, Sophie, and Liv. Voicemail from Gwen.
49	"Episode 9: May 1997."	20:40	December 15, 2020
Voicemails to Nan, Liv, and Sophie. Voicemail from Gwen.
50	"Episode 10: March 1997."	31:48	December 29, 2020
Voicemails to Nan. Voicemail from Gwen.

=== Season 6: "Caregiver" ===
No.	Title	Running time	Original release date
51	"Episode 1: Monday 22 October 1973"	19:57	October 12, 2021
52	"Episode 2: Tuesday 23 October 1973"	21:09	October 19, 2021
53	"Episode 3: Wednesday 24 October 1973"	21:38	October 26, 2021
54	"Episode 4: Thursday 25 October 1973"	21:58	November 2, 2021
55	"Episode 5: Friday 26 October 1973"	21:39	November 9, 2021
56	"Episode 6: Saturday 27 October 1973"	23:29	November 16, 2021
57	"Episode 7: Sunday 28 October 1973"	19:32	November 23, 2021
58	"Episode 8: Monday 29 October 1973"	22:30	November 30, 2021
59	"Episode 9: Tuesday 30 October"	18:02	December 7, 2021
60	"Episode 10: Samhain"	26:51	December 14, 2021

=== Season 7: "Scavenger Hunt" ===
No.	Title	Running time	Original release date
61	"Episode 1: Amarillo"	15:38	October 18, 2022
62	"Episode 2: Miami"	19:58	October 25, 2022
63	"Episode 3: Tekapo"	21:07	November 1, 2022
64	"Episode 4: Jakarta"	19:14	November 8, 2022
65	"Episode 5: Adelaide"	21:29	November 15, 2022
66	"Episode 6: Arusha"	19:51	November 22, 2022
67	"Episode 7: Venice"	18:44	November 29, 2022
68	"Episode 8: Glasgow"	16:24	December 6, 2022
69	"Episode 9: Medellín"	17:08	December 13, 2022
70	"Episode 10: Palo Duro"	16:42	December 20, 2022

=== Season 8: "Leadership Seminar" ===
No.	Title	Running time	Original release date
71	"Cassette 1: Take Responsibility!"	20:11	October 17, 2023
72	"Cassette 2: Inspiration, aspiration, Actualization!"	25:23	October 24, 2023
73	"Cassette 3: Journal Your Life!"	17:45	October 31, 2023
74	"Cassette 4: You Make Your Own Opportunity!"	19:54	November 7, 2023
75	"Cassette 5: Trust Your Instincts!"	18:14	November 14, 2023
76	"Cassette 6: It's All About Balance!"	19:15	November 21, 2023
77	"Cassette 7: Cultivate Your Brand!"	16:59	November 28, 2023
78	"Cassette 8: Invest in Yourself!"	22:44	December 5, 2023
79	"Cassette 9: Sell the Idea of You!"	15:09	December 12, 2023
80	"Cassette 10: Learn from Your Mistakes!"	22:02	December 19, 2023

=== Season 9: "Audiobook" ===
No.	Title	Running time	Original release date
81	"Cassette 1: Breakfast"	18:37	October 15, 2024
SIDE A: What did you have for breakfast today? SIDE B: Children of the past
82	"Cassette 2: Listening Carefully"	20:59	October 22, 2024
SIDE A: Where do you get your clothes? SIDE B: Travel and languages
83	"Cassette 3: Pick Your Battles"	19:37	October 29, 2024
SIDE A: A thing called war SIDE B: Propaganda is a tool
84	"Cassette 4: Start from Scratch"	18:10	November 5, 2024
SIDE A: The toll of the Great Reckoning SIDE B: Bangalore, summer of 1950
85	"Cassette 5: History is Narrative"	17:43	November 12, 2024
SIDE A: How the New Society ended war SIDE B: No reason to be unhappy
86	"Cassette 6: Talk Your Way Out of This One"	22:50	November 19, 2024
SIDE A: The world knew it had to change SIDE B: The Belgrade summit of 1947
87	"Cassette 7: New Beginnings"	18:17	November 26, 2024
SIDE A: Have you ever made a really big mess? SIDE B: The mess of the Great Reckoning
88	"Cassette 8: Rewriting Wrongs"	19:34	December 3, 2024
SIDE A: Life before the New Society SIDE B: How the pre-Reckoning world worked
89	"Cassette 9: Regression"	18:12	December 10, 2024
SIDE A: Mothers and fathers SIDE B: Excerpt from Tamburlaine the Great Part II and the founding of the New Society
90	"Cassette 10: Finding Your True Voice"	23:28	December 17, 2024
SIDE A: Preface from the Director of the DCD SIDE B: You are the future

=== Season 10: "Research Island" ===
No.	Title	Running time	Original release date
91	"Cassette 1: Research Island"	21:42	October 14, 2025
92	"Cassette 2: Wildlife"	15:38	October 21, 2025
93	"Cassette 3: Protests"	17:30	October 28, 2025
94	"Cassette 4: Spooked"	14:58	November 4, 2025
95	"Cassette 5: Concrete"	14:59	November 11, 2025
96	"Cassette 6: Strange Flowers"	16:35	November 18, 2025
97	"Cassette 7: Haunted Mansion"	18:49	November 25, 2025
98	"Cassette 8: Struggling"	15:53	December 2, 2025
99	"Cassette 9: Delivery"	15:12	December 9, 2025
100	"Cassette 10: You Should See It"	18:33	December 16, 2025

=== Bonus: "Black Box" ===
Within the Wires' Patreon includes an exclusive season called "Black Box", released four times a year, on solstices and equinoxes. The season tells the story of an unnamed pilot (narrated by Cranor) through his black box recordings.

No.	Title	Running time	Original release date
B1	"Black Box Cassette 1: PHL to PWM"	12:31	March 20, 2018
B2	"Black Box Cassette 2: PWM to MDW"	11:16	June 21, 2018
B3	"Black Box Cassette 3: MDW to YYZ"	14:30	September 23, 2018
B4	"Black Box Cassette 4: YYZ to ATL"	13:43	December 21, 2018
B5	"Black Box Cassette 5: HOU to LAX"	11:23	March 20, 2019
B6	"Black Box Cassette 6: LAX to SEA, SEA to YUL, YUL to MSY"	8:50	June 21, 2019
B7	"Black Box Cassette 7: MSY to HOU"	10:30	September 23, 2019
B8	"Black Box Cassette 8: LAX to SEA"	8:40	December 25, 2019
B9	"Black Box Cassette 9: SEA to TIL, TIL to ABQ"	12:54	May 30, 2020
B10	"Black Box Cassette 10: ABQ to SCL, LIT to ???"	11:48	January 25, 2021

=== Live ===
Within the Wires' first live show was performed by Janina Matthewson at the London Podcast Festival on September 13, 2018. They did two live shows starring Lee LeBreton, one at Largo at the Coronet in Los Angeles on April 27, 2019 and one at PodX in Nashville, Tennessee on June 2, 2019.

== Book ==
In 2021, Cranor and Matthewson published You Feel It Just Below the Ribs, a novel set in the universe of Within the Wires. A fictional work written in the style of an annotated autobiography, it details the events of the "Great Reckoning" and the formation of the Society from the point of view of one of the survivors. The book was released on November 16, 2021. The audiobook was narrated by Kirsten Potter and Adepero Oduye.

== Reception ==
Marc Hershon of The Huffington Post positively reviewed the second episode, stating that it "has a distinctive flavor all its own" and that the show is "every bit as warped as [Welcome to Night Vale]." Nathan Dorer of The Rensselaer Polytechnic positively reviewed the first season, finding that "the evolution of the podcast throughout the first season was borderline artful" and praising Matthewson's narration and the "effective" atmosphere of the podcast. Steve Greene of IndieWire praised the podcast as "an off-kilter delight" and observed that it was "something that can only exist in this medium." Devon Taylor of The Sarahs observed that because the story is "parceled out slowly" it could "frustrate listeners accustomed to a more linear plot," while also drawing positive comparisons to Lost and the works of David Lynch.
