= Alice Isn't Dead =

Horror fiction podcast

- Genre: Mystery; Supernatural horror Drama; Horror podcast
- Language: English

Creative team
- Created by: Joseph Fink
- Written by: Joseph Fink

Cast and voices
- Narrated by: Jasika Nicole; Erica Livingston; Roberta Colindrez

Music
- Opening theme: "Le Petit Bleu de la Côte Ouest" by Disparition

Publication
- No. of seasons: 3
- No. of episodes: Main: 30; Bonus: 10
- Original release: March 8, 2016 – August 28, 2018

Related
- Website: www.nightvalepresents.com/aliceisntdead

Alice Isn't Dead is a mystery horror fiction podcast created by Joseph Fink and produced by Night Vale Presents. It stars Jasika Nicole as Keisha, a truck driver who embarks on a road trip across America to locate her missing wife Alice, which leads to her uncovering several paranormal mysteries and conspiracies. The story is presented as radio transmissions of Keisha narrating her experiences on the road.

The podcast ran from March 8, 2016 to August 28, 2018 across three seasons, totaling 30 episodes. During its initial run, new episodes typically released biweekly on Tuesdays. Alice Isn't Dead was well-received and nominated for multiple podcast awards. In 2018, Fink published a novelization of the story.

On January 21, 2026, Fink announced that a sequel podcast entitled Don't Tell Alice would begin on April 13, with Nicole returning as Keisha.

== Production ==
In an interview with the Huffington Post, Joseph Fink explained that the inspiration for the podcast came from his experiences traveling around in vans on long trips, particularly in the United States, for the live shows of his popular podcast Welcome to Night Vale. The series puts particular focus on the narrator driving through towns without stopping and spending time at rest stops along the highway. All ten episodes of the first season were written by Fink, with music by Disparition.

Jasika Nicole, the voice of Keisha Taylor, also appears on Welcome to Night Vale in the role of Dana Cardinal. She was pitched Alice Isn't Dead during a conversation with Fink before one of the Night Vale live shows and signed on immediately, receiving scripts a few months later. The first season was partially funded through sponsored advertising by Audible Inc., Squarespace, Casper Sleep, and Blue Apron – a practice that would continue with other series under the Night Vale Presents banner such as Within the Wires and The Orbiting Human Circus (of the Air).

Roberta Colindrez, who appeared in the original cast of Fun Home and was a member of the Neo-Futurists alongside much of the Night Vale Presents crew, makes an uncredited voice cameo in the finale of Part 1. She makes her first credited appearance as this character in the bonus episode "Haugen, Montana", narrating in place of Jasika Nicole, before making an appearance in the premiere of Part 2. Erica Livingston, also a former Neo-Futurist, makes an uncredited voice cameo as the titular Alice in the finale of Part 2, before making her first credited appearance as the character narrating the bonus episode "Mérida, Yucatán".

== List of episodes ==
=== Series overview ===
Season	Episodes		Originally released	
Season	Episodes		First released	Last released
Part 1	10		March 8, 2016	July 12, 2016
Part 2	10		April 4, 2017	August 8, 2017
Part 3	10		April 24, 2018	August 28, 2018
Bonus	10	3	March 14, 2017	March 28, 2017
Bonus	10	3	March 26, 2018	April 10, 2018
Bonus	10	4	June 26, 2018	October 29, 2018

=== Part 1 (2016) ===
No.	Title	Written by	Starring	Date	Running time
1	"Omelet"	Joseph Fink	Jasika Nicole	March 8, 2016	20:47
"A conversation in a diner gets ugly."
2	"Alice"	Joseph Fink	Jasika Nicole	March 22, 2016	22:25
"What is happening in the town of Charlatan?"
3	"Nothing to See"	Joseph Fink	Jasika Nicole	April 5, 2016	21:13
"What was that sound in the trailer just now?"
4	"The Factory by the Sea"	Joseph Fink	Jasika Nicole	April 19, 2016	21:23
"A delivery in Florida turns strange."
5	"Signs & Wonders"	Joseph Fink	Jasika Nicole	May 3, 2016	27:16
"The billboards have something to tell us."
6	"Sylvia"	Joseph Fink	Jasika Nicole	May 17, 2016	24:29
"A passenger leads her far from where she planned to go."
7	"Let's Break into a Police Station"	Joseph Fink	Jasika Nicole	May 31, 2016	24:13
"They break into a police station."
8	"The Other Town"	Joseph Fink	Jasika Nicole	June 13, 2016	25:46
"What is happening in Victorville, CA?"
9	"Go Home Again"	Joseph Fink	Jasika Nicole	June 28, 2016	22:17
"She goes home. But something is waiting there for her."
10	"Thistle"	Joseph Fink	Jasika Nicole, Roberta Colindrez	July 12, 2016	37:56
"Season finale. The end of one search, and the start of another."

=== Part 2 (2017) ===
No.	Title	Written by	Starring	Date	Running time
11	"The Last Free Place"	Joseph Fink	Jasika Nicole, Roberta Colindrez	April 4, 2017	25:20
"A dangerous meeting in the last free place."
12	"Mouth of the Water"	Joseph Fink	Jasika Nicole	April 18, 2017	28:34
"A mystery at the mouth of a river."
13	"Abandoned Places"	Joseph Fink	Jasika Nicole	May 2, 2017	23:56
"What waits in the abandoned places?"
14	"Chain"	Joseph Fink	Jasika Nicole	May 16, 2017	24:34
"Each Kmart sign looks like each Kmart sign; every Subway sandwich tastes the same."
15	"Taconic"	Joseph Fink	Jasika Nicole	May 29, 2017	25:23
"Sylvia investigates her mother's murder."
16	"Badwater"	Joseph Fink	Jasika Nicole, Roberta Colindrez	June 13, 2017	24:10
"Two voices in a desert."
17	"The Monk of Crystal Springs"	Joseph Fink	Jasika Nicole	June 27, 2017	26:31
"Once a man lived at the Crystal Springs Rest Area. He doesn't live there anymore."
18	"Absent Family"	Joseph Fink	Jasika Nicole	July 11, 2017	23:53
"The return to a certain abandoned house."
19	"Prey"	Joseph Fink	Jasika Nicole, Roberta Colindrez	July 25, 2017	28:08
"A question is raised; a decision is made."
20	"Why Am I Alive?"	Joseph Fink	Jasika Nicole, Roberta Colindrez, Erica Livingston	August 8, 2017	27:33
"Did I know from the first time I saw you Alice? It feels like I did."

=== Part 3 (2018) ===
No.	Title	Written by	Starring	Date	Running time
21	"Cause and Effect"	Joseph Fink	Jasika Nicole, Erica Livingston	April 24, 2018	20:19
"Causality is a tricky thing."
22	"Surroundings"	Joseph Fink	Jasika Nicole, Erica Livingston	May 8, 2018	20:33
"There are oracles on these roads."
23	"Means of Escape"	Joseph Fink	Jasika Nicole, Erica Livingston	May 22, 2018	24:09
"When it's time to leave, do it quickly."
24	"Three Nights at the Old Motel"	Joseph Fink	Jasika Nicole, Erica Livingston	June 5, 2018	25:55
"Watch out for the locals."
25	"What Happened to Hank Thompson"	Joseph Fink	Jasika Nicole, Erica Livingston	June 19, 2018	23:05
"The bad is as human as the good."
26	"This Isn't It"	Joseph Fink	Jasika Nicole, Erica Livingston	July 3, 2018	18:59
"Is this it? (It isn't.)"
27	"Speakers"	Joseph Fink	Jasika Nicole, Erica Livingston	July 17, 2018	22:39
"Man, this isn't even close to the weirdest thing."
28	"To Forgive"	Joseph Fink	Jasika Nicole, Erica Livingston	July 31, 2018	20:50
"I don't know if you deserve forgiveness."
29	"Praxis"	Joseph Fink	Jasika Nicole, Erica Livingston	August 14, 2018	24:54
"It didn't feel like fear. It felt like movement."
30	"An Ending"	Joseph Fink	Jasika Nicole, Erica Livingston, Roberta Colindrez	August 28, 2018	27:17
"All road trips end."

=== Bonus episodes ===
During the lead ups to the releases of Part 2 and Part 3, short bonus episodes were released to advertise the podcast's return.

==== Part 2 (2017) ====
No. in season	Title	Written by	Starring	Date	Running time
1	"(3) North Rim, Arizona"	Joseph Fink	Jasika Nicole	March 14, 2017	3:57
"A cold morning at the Grand Canyon."
2	"(2) Fremont, Washington"	Joseph Fink	Jasika Nicole	March 21, 2017	4:00
"A vision under a bridge."
3	"(1) Haugen, Montana"	Joseph Fink	Roberta Colindrez	March 28, 2017	3:16
"Allow me to introduce myself."

==== Part 3 (2018) ====
No. in season	Title	Written by	Starring	Date	Running time
1	"(1) Perth, Western Australia"	Joseph Fink	Jasika Nicole	March 26, 2018	4:31
"There are many places I'll never go."
2	"(2) Mérida, Yucatán"	Joseph Fink	Erica Livingston	April 3, 2018	3:56
"I know I have a lot to answer for. And I will. I'll answer for it all."
3	"(3) Los Angeles, California"	Joseph Fink	Jasika Nicole	April 10, 2018 (Note: This episode was originally performed live in Los Angeles on April 5, 2018.)	36:24
"Our special, one-off live episode as performed by Jasika Nicole and Disparition in Los Angeles on April 5, 2018."

Another live show, entitled "The Finish Line", was performed at Live at the Coronet in Los Angeles on April 27, 2019, and was released digitally on November 14, 2019.

==== Patreon-exclusive ====
As part of the Patreon campaign for Part 3, several bonus episodes were released to patrons of the show. On October 14, 2019, the first four Patreon exclusive episodes were released publicly as a compilation episode called "The Window & The Mirror".

No. in season	Title	Written by	Starring	Date	Running time
1	"Singapore"	Joseph Fink	Jasika Nicole	June 26, 2018	3:28
2	"House on the Rock"	Joseph Fink	Jasika Nicole	July 9, 2018	2:59
3	"Skagway"	Joseph Fink	Jasika Nicole	July 16, 2018	3:25
4	"Whitby"	Joseph Fink	Jasika Nicole	August 7, 2018	3:07
5	"Newport"	Joseph Fink	Jasika Nicole	October 25, 2018	4:29
6	"Darvaza"	Joseph Fink	Jasika Nicole	October 26, 2018	3:59
7	"Camarillo"	Joseph Fink	Jasika Nicole	October 29, 2018	4:52

== Novel ==
Joseph Fink published a novel version of Alice Isn't Dead on November 20, 2018. A hardcover edition of this book was published in 2018 by Harper-Collins Publishers. It was copyrighted in 2018 by Joseph Fink. The letter to the reader was copyrighted in 2021 by Joseph Fink. First Harper Perennial paperback edition published 2021. Library of Congress Cataloging-in-Publication Data has been applied for. The ISBN is 978-0-06-284414-9 (pbk.) David Canfield from Entertainment Weekly reviewed the novel writing, "[Fink's] flashy horror stylings don’t fully translate to the page — the creepy, anxious factor of his audio work is second to none — and the pacing, as Fink tries veering between new points of view, turns clunky. But this Alice Isn't Dead remains an intriguing complement, imbued with newfound soul — and romance. Alice has always known suspense, but as a novel it finds true love."

== Reception ==
Cassandra Khaw of Ars Technica positively reviewed the first three episodes, stating that the series "very quickly comes into its own, dropping any pretence of gallows humour for the kind of creeping, consuming terror that pervades the best horror movies." Neil Verma compared the modus operandi of the Thistle Man, the series' antagonist who follows its narrator as she drives across America, to that of the eponymous villain in Lucille Fletcher's 1941 radio play The Hitch-Hiker.

=== Awards ===
Year	Award	Category	Reciptiant	Result	Ref.
2017	Audio Verse Awards	Best Production for an Ongoing, Dramatic, Production	Podcast	Finalist	
2018	S.P.C. Awards	Earphones Award Winner	Audiobook	Won	
2019	iHeartRadio Podcast Awards	Best Scripted Podcast	Podcast	Finalist	
2019	Lambda Literary Awards	Lesbian Mystery	Podcast	Nominated	

== Unproduced television adaptation ==
A television adaptation of the podcast was in development for USA Network by Universal Cable Productions. The series would have been written and executive produced by Kyle Bradstreet, who would have served as showrunner. Fink would have written for and executive produced the show. The show was ultimately not picked up.

== See also ==
- Horror podcast
