= It Devours! =

2017 novel by Joseph Fink and Jeffrey Cranor

- First edition cover
- Author: Joseph Fink; Jeffrey Cranor
- Audio read by: Cecil Baldwin
- Illustrator: Jessica Hayworth
- Language: English
- Genre: Supernatural, mystery, surreal comedy, absurdism, horror
- Published: October 17, 2017
- Publisher: Harper Perennial (US); Orbit Books (UK)
- Publication place: United States
- Media type: Print (hardback, large print paperback), e-book, audiobook
- Pages: 368
- ISBN: 0062351427
- Preceded by: Welcome to Night Vale
- Followed by: The Faceless Old Woman Who Secretly Lives in Your Home

It Devours! is a 2017 absurdist supernatural mystery novel by Joseph Fink and Jeffrey Cranor, and is the second book based on their podcast Welcome to Night Vale (2012–present). The story follows young scientist Nilanjana Sikdar as she investigates the Joyous Congregation of the Smiling God amid a series of mysterious disappearances in Night Vale.

It was published through Harper Perennial in the United States and Orbit Books in the United Kingdom. The audiobook is narrated by Cecil Baldwin, star of the Night Vale podcast. The novel received positive reviews from critics.

== Synopsis ==
Nilanjana Sikdar is a scientist in the fictional town of Night Vale. Employed by Carlos, the town's leading scientist, she prioritizes facts and logic. Her principles are challenged when Carlos assigns her to investigate a mysterious rumbling in the desert wasteland outside of town. This investigation introduces her to the Joyous Congregation of the Smiling God and Darryl, a dedicated group member. As she navigates her belief in science and growing feelings for Darryl, Nilanjana suspects that the Congregation is planning a ritual that could endanger the town. Nilanjana and Darryl attempt to reconcile their differing perspectives to uncover and confront the Congregation's darkest secret.

== Reception ==
It Devours! received positive reviews, with praise directed towards its humor, characters, and exploration of the dichotomy between religion and science. Danielle Maurer called it "one of [my] favorite books of [2017]" and "so much better than Welcome to Night Vale (the 2015 book, not the podcast)".
