= Welcome to Night Vale (novel) =

2015 novel by Joseph Fink and Jeffrey Cranor

- Author: Joseph Fink; Jeffrey Cranor
- Audio read by: Cecil Baldwin; Dylan Marron; Retta; Thérèse Plummer; Dan Bittner
- Language: English
- Genre: Supernatural, mystery, surreal comedy, absurdism, horror
- Published: October 20, 2015
- Publisher: Harper Perennial (US); Orbit Books (UK)
- Publication place: United States
- Media type: Print (hardback, large print paperback), e-book, audiobook
- Pages: 416
- ISBN: 0062351427
- Followed by: It Devours!

Welcome to Night Vale is a 2015 absurdist supernatural mystery novel by Joseph Fink and Jeffrey Cranor, based on their popular podcast of the same name. It was first published through Harper Perennial in the United States and Orbit Books in the United Kingdom.

Unlike the podcast, the novel is narrated from an omniscient viewpoint that follows teenage pawn-shop owner Jackie Fierro and PTA treasurer Diane Crayton as they investigate two mysteries in Night Vale that bring their lives closer together. The audiobook is narrated by Cecil Baldwin, Dylan Marron, Retta, Thérèse Plummer, and Dan Bittner.

The novel received positive reviews and was a bestseller upon its release. It is set within the canon of the podcast and was followed up with the episode "An Epilogue". Two more Night Vale novels, It Devours! and The Faceless Old Woman Who Secretly Lives in Your Home, were released in the following years, although they followed different stories and characters.

== Synopsis ==
In the small desert town of Night Vale, where the supernatural and bizarre are commonplace, a mysterious man in a tan jacket has been giving people slips of paper that say "King City" on them, and are unable to be removed from the hands of those who accept them. When Jackie Fierro, owner of the town pawn shop, receives a paper from the man, she becomes determined to uncover the truth about him and about King City, wherever it might be.

Meanwhile, Diane Crayton, the town's PTA treasurer, is attempting to reconnect with her son Josh, a fifteen-year-old shapeshifter, when his father, Troy Walsh, reappears in town. Diane attempts to keep Josh from seeing Troy, who seems to be multiple people all at once somehow, as she also begins investigating the disappearance of her coworker Evan McIntyre. Her investigation gets her fired from her job, but Evan resurfaces, revealing himself to be the man in the tan jacket, and gives Diane one of his "King City" papers to give to Josh. She does not give Josh the paper, and finds that she remembers very little about the man aside from his tan jacket mere moments after speaking with him, with even his name fading from her mind.

Eventually, Jackie and Diane's separate investigations draw them together, and they reluctantly agree to work together to solve the mysteries once they realize they may be connected. When Josh disappears, leaving behind hints that he had gone to King City, Diane frantically tries to get there through various means of transportation, but keeps ending up back in Night Vale. After Jackie learns that Troy is also her father too, she hears on the community radio station about plastic flamingo lawn ornaments that teleport anyone who touches them to another time and place. Seeing it as their only option, Diane and Jackie locate the flamingos and use them to teleport to King City, California.

Once they arrive in King City, a desolate and decaying town, they locate the man in the tan jacket, who explains that he is King City's mayor. The once ordinary King City had been infected by Night Vale's supernatural influence when Troy Walsh decided to move there, multiplying himself to be as helpful as possible, and reducing the mayor to being so quick to leave people's memories that half the time, King City forgot it even had a mayor. The mayor had been trying to find a way to get one of Troy's children to King City to help him understand Troy and maybe make him go away so his city can be normal again.

Josh and Diane are reunited, and they, along with Jackie, confront a hoard of Troys outside a bar, and convince him to return to Night Vale and stop being so irresponsible. He agrees, and they all leave King City via the plastic flamingos, and King City is returned to normalcy. Once back in Night Vale, everyone settles into a new routine for themselves, much more comfortable and fulfilling than the one they had before.

== Reception ==
Critical reception for Welcome to Night Vale has been positive and the novel was one of the Washington Post's top science-fiction and fantasy picks for October 2015. Cory Doctorow praised the novel in his review at Boing Boing, stating "Shot through it all is the love and integrity that made Night Vale a success from the beginning. After 400 pages, some of Night Vale's mysteries have been laid bare, we've been initiated into new ones, and most of all, we know that we're in the midst of some wonderful people."

In contrast, The A.V. Club gave Welcome to Night Vale a grade of C+, criticizing Fink and Cranor for including too many references from the podcast, which they felt "reduces the plot’s progression to a crawl". They also wrote that the book improved in the later chapters, writing that it became "a wonderfully creepy tale filled with revelations about the nature of the town and its residents. Those tantalizing final few chapters provide a glimpse of what Fink and Cranor might be capable of when freed of the constraints of making references and allowed to just tell a story in their fascinating setting."
