= Every Single Word =

- Born: Dylan Marron

YouTube information
- Channel: dylanmarron
- Years active: 2015–2016
- Subscribers: 19.9 thousand
- Website: www.dylanmarron.com/every-single-word

Every Single Word (Spoken by a Person of Color) is a Tumblr blog and YouTube channel that features videos on all the lines spoken by people of color (POC) in both contemporary and classic films. Created by Dylan Marron, the videos are an attempt to highlight the lack of casting and involvement of POC in Hollywood produced films, in addition to highlighting his own experiences in attempting to be cast in films as a Venezuelan American.

The reasons for such low amounts of casting of POC in films is stated by Marron to be about fear, because the "people who finance the movies are not going to want to throw millions behind a movie of a non-famous person of color". In addition, default casting for films, even for works or scripts with no specified races for the characters, is to choose white actors. The novel The Fault in Our Stars by John Green is noted by Marron as a work with no races given for the characters and one that has had worldwide success in its book form, but the main cast for the film were chosen by the producing studio to be entirely white. Manohla Dargis, writing for The New York Times, noted that Marron's videos show that even when POC are cast in films, they are often cast in stereotypical roles that function as tokenism for the casting quota. The Boston Globe compared Marron's videos with other statistics presented in the "2015 Hollywood Diversity Report", which showed that scriptwriters and directors are also rarely POC, along with lead roles in films.

Several celebrities have praised and shared the blog with their fans, including Aziz Ansari, Junot Díaz, Kerry Washington, and Chirlane McCray. The blog was named by Tumblr as the most viral blog of 2015.

== History ==
Marron began producing the video cuts in June 2015 and the popularity of the blog began to increase soon after beginning the project. The idea for the blog came after Marron started a play titled "Every Single Word" for his theater group, called the New York Neo Futurists, which involved a large number of short play pieces by different members. Marron's act consisted of him saying every line by Anjelah Johnson-Reyes in Enough Said. In 2014, while re-watching the film, he realized that the writer was unable to view POC as separate from service jobs and caused him to form his act for the group. This act eventually led to his investigation of other films and the creation of his video cut blog.

The coverage of POC representation in the Harry Potter series by Marron resulted in some controversy. Some fans were upset that the videos pointed out the low representation, "5 minutes and 40 seconds long – out of 1,207 total minutes of run-time" and the whitewashing of the character Lavender Brown from the black actresses that had played her in the first five movies to the "blond woman" from the sixth movie on, when the character has a heavier involvement and lines in the plot. After doing videos on a number of popular movies and series, Marron decided to do a series of videos on every Academy Award for Best Picture winner since the first award in 1929, in chronological order so that any differences in POC casting can be seen in relation to historical time period. Marron also created a series of videos looking at all the films directed by Nancy Meyers, six films in total. He found that POC representation across all of the films made up only 0.7% of run-time and that most of the characters were not named and were presented as working service jobs.

A "Every Single Word: The Oscars" live event was conducted by Marron on February 28, 2016 in New York City, where the words spoken by people of color during the Oscars was live cut during viewing.

== Media featured ==
* The films and television shows below are presented in chronological order except for those released in the same year, which are presented alphabetically:

=== Films ===
Title	Year released	No. of POC	Length of video (in seconds)
Wings (silent film)	1927	0 (seen)	0:14
The Broadway Melody	1929	0	0:08
All Quiet on the Western Front	1930	0	0:09
Cimarron	1931	5	2:10
Grand Hotel	1932	0	0:08
Cavalcade	1933	0	0:10
It Happened One Night	1934	2	0:52
Mutiny on the Bounty	1935	7	3:57
The Great Ziegfeld	1936	2	0:39
The Life of Emile Zola	1937	0	0:08
You Can't Take It with You	1938	2	1:49
Gone with the Wind	1939	11	14:52
Rebecca	1940	0	0:06
How Green Was My Valley	1941	0	0:07
Jaws	1975	0	0:07
E.T. the Extra-Terrestrial	1982	1	0:09
Mrs. Doubtfire	1993	2	0:10
Titanic	1997	3	0:54
What Women Want	2000	10	2:06
Harry Potter film series	2001–2011	13	6:18
The Lord of the Rings trilogy	2001–2003	4	0:46
Wet Hot American Summer	2001	0	0:07
Something's Gotta Give	2003	4	1:53
Wedding Crashers	2005	3	0:39
The Holiday	2006	6	0:37
Juno	2007	4	1:26
500 Days of Summer	2009	4	0:30
It's Complicated	2009	5	0:45
Black Swan	2010	1	0:24
Friends with Benefits	2011	4	0:54
Midnight in Paris	2011	2	0:13
Moonrise Kingdom	2012	1	0:10
American Hustle	2013	5	0:53
Enough Said	2013	1	0:45
Frances Ha	2013	4	0:30
Her	2013	4	0:46
Birdman	2014	9	0:52
The Fault in Our Stars	2014	1	0:41
Into the Woods	2014	0	0:07
Maleficent	2014	1	0:18
Noah	2014	0	0:10
Spotlight	2015	4	0:27
The Intern	2015	5	0:26

=== Television shows ===
Title	Year released	No. of POC	Length of video (in seconds)
Girls (pilot)	2012	3	0:25
