= Beryl Te Wiata =

New Zealand actor, author and scriptwriter

- Born: Beryl Margaret McMillan; 15 April 1925; Christchurch, New Zealand
- Died: 4 May 2017 (aged 92); Auckland, New Zealand
- Education: Royal Central School of Speech and Drama
- Occupations: Actress; author; scriptwriter
- Spouse: Inia Te Wiata (m. 1959; died 1971)
- Children: 1; Rima Te Wiata

Beryl Margaret Te Wiata (née McMillan; 15 April 1925 – 4 May 2017) was a New Zealand actor, author, and scriptwriter.

== Early life and family ==
Born in Christchurch on 15 April 1925, Te Wiata was the daughter of Ethel Laura McMillan (née Hamilton) and Archibald Neil McMillan. She was educated at Wellington East Girls' College from 1939 to 1941, and the Central School of Speech and Drama in London from 1949 to 1950.

In 1948 she was working as a secretary in London when she met opera singer Inia Te Wiata. They married on 24 October 1959 at Evesham, Worcestershire, England, and had one daughter, Rima, who became an actor and entertainer. Inia Te Wiata died in 1971, and Beryl Te Wiata returned to New Zealand with her daughter two years later.

== Career ==
Beryl Te Wiata was a film, television and stage actress. Her television appearances included roles on Shortland Street, Mercy Peak, Outrageous Fortune, Hercules: The Legendary Journeys, and Xena: Warrior Princess. She was also a panelist on the New Zealand version of the television advice show Beauty and the Beast, hosted by Selwyn Toogood.

She appeared in movies including the 1981 mystery horror Strange Behavior, Constance in 1984, Mesmerized in 1986, and the 1993 biopic Bread & Roses based on the life of Sonja Davies. She wrote most of the comic sketches for, and starred in, two one-woman stage shows, Mrs. Kiwi Arthur presents and Mrs. Kiwi Arthur presents … more in the early 1980s.

She wrote a biography of her late husband, titled Most happy fella: a biography of Inia Te Wiata, first published in 1976, as well as his biography for the Dictionary of New Zealand Biography. In 2007, she compiled and wrote the liner notes for 49 tracks performed by Inia Te Wiata, released by the National Library of New Zealand.

== Death ==
Beryl Te Wiata died on 4 May 2017, aged 92. She is survived by her daughter, Rima Te Wiata.
