= Inia Te Wiata =

New Zealand opera singer, actor and artist (1915–1971)

Inia Te Wiata MBE
- Born: Inia Morehu Tauhia Watene Iarahi Waihurihia Te Wiata; 10 June 1915; Ōtaki, New Zealand
- Died: 26 June 1971 (aged 56); London, England
- Occupations: Opera singer, actor, and artist
- Spouse: Beryl Te Wiata
- Children: Rima Te Wiata

Inia Morehu Tauhia Watene Iarahi Waihurihia Te Wiata MBE (10 June 1915 – 26 June 1971) was a New Zealand Māori bass-baritone opera singer, film actor, kaiwhakairo (carver) and artist.

== Early life ==
Inia Te Wiata was born in Ōtaki, New Zealand, into the Ngāti Raukawa ki te Tonga iwi. His father, Watene Te Wiata, died in the 1918 influenza epidemic. His mother, Constance Helena Johnson, remarried soon afterwards, and Inia was brought up by Pairoroku and Rakate Rikihana, relatives of his father.

== Early career ==
Te Wiata developed an interest in singing and first performed on stage at the age of seven. He attended the Ōtaki state school and was taught music by Miss Edith Miller. After primary school, he attended Ōtaki Māori College, and at the age of 13 his voice broke and settled into a bass-baritone. Soon after, he joined his cousin's quartet, which included Wi Nicholls, Henry Tahiwi, and Dan Rikihana. Other family members encouraged Te Wiata in his singing, particularly Mrs Mihi Taylor, a member of the Rikihana family, who taught both Te Wiata and his cousin to sing duets.

Te Wiata moved to Tūrangawaewae at Ngāruawāhia in the Waikato region to pursue an interest in Māori carving, whakairo. He was taught by Piri Poutapu, and first worked on carvings in the Kawhia Methodist Church and the Te Winika canoe. He was employed for three years assisting with the carving of the mantelpiece of Turongo, the house of the Māori King, which opened in 1936. During his time in Ngāruawāhia he married Rose Evelyn Friar, known as Ivy. They had six children: Ianui, Kirikowhai, Hinemoana, Gloria, Budgie (who died as a toddler), and Inia Junior. Te Wiata also did seasonal labouring work at the Horotiu Freezing works, near Hamilton. He continued his public singing during this time and was a very active member of the Waiata Māori Choir. This choir was organised by the Superintendent of the Methodist Māori Mission, Reverend A. J. Seamer, and toured all over New Zealand. Te Wiata's work on Turongo prevented him from joining the Choir when they toured Great Britain.

Te Wiata began to develop a circle of supporters who wished to help him further his singing education. Mr Grant of Hamilton, Mr H. D. Caro (the then Mayor of Hamilton), Dame Hilda Ross, Sir Joseph Hannan, Stewart Garland, and the conductor Anderson Tyrer were all impressed by his talent. A favourable professional opinion of Te Wiata's voice was acquired from Australian singer Peter Dawson, and Anderson Tyrer was put in charge of arranging Te Wiata's study overseas. Thanks to fundraising and a government grant, in 1947 Te Wiata left for London for three years' study at the Trinity College of Music.

== Formal musical training and career ==
Te Wiata worked hard at his craft. In addition to his studies at Trinity College, he also took private lessons from James Kennedy Scott and language lessons at the Berlitz School of Languages. To gain more experience with opera, he joined the opera company run by the English soprano Joan Cross and had a resounding success with his portrayal of Sarastro from Mozart's The Magic Flute. As the end of the three-year study grant was approaching, the Prime Minister of New Zealand, Peter Fraser, visited England and Te Wiata took the opportunity to successfully apply for a grant for a fourth year.

Nearing the end of his grant, Te Wiata decided to audition for the Covent Garden Opera Company. He was successful in his audition and was told to turn up for rehearsal the next day. He was launched into his first role in the opera company as the Speaker in The Magic Flute. He went from strength to strength, taking parts in operas The Marriage of Figaro, La bohème, Billy Budd and Gloriana – the parts for the last two being specially written for him by Benjamin Britten.

As his reputation grew, Te Wiata was also approached to perform in television and film productions. He appeared in a number of films, including Man of the Moment (1955) and In Search of the Castaways (1962), and also took the lead in the film The Seekers (1954). He took part in a number of television series. He did not restrict himself to singing in pure opera but also starred in musicals, including The Most Happy Fella at the London Coliseum.

In 1959 his first marriage was dissolved and he married Beryl McMillan, also a singer and actor. Their daughter Rima Te Wiata was born in 1963, and also became an actor and later an artist. Beryl gave up acting after her marriage to concentrate on managing Te Wiata's career.

While Te Wiata returned to New Zealand periodically, he continued with his singing career in the United Kingdom, living in London and creating a life there with his wife and child. Te Wiata was a popular man and had a large circle of friends and acquaintances, including the comedian Spike Milligan. Te Wiata remained extremely fond of New Zealand and talked of returning there on his retirement. He maintained close links with New Zealand House in London, attending and singing at the opening of the House in 1963 and also working in the basement of New Zealand House on carving projects.

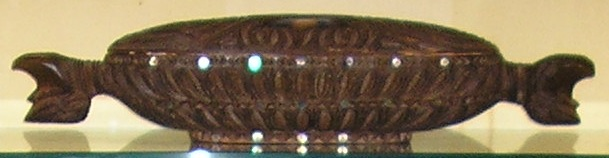
Waka huia carved for Sir Thomas Macdonald to present to the Worshipful Company of Butchers

Te Wiata carved a fine waka huia for Sir Thomas Macdonald, New Zealand's High Commissioner, to present to the Worshipful Company of Butchers on Macdonald's departure from London. Te Wiata also had a long-term project carving five large tōtara logs. He continued working on this project in between his professional obligations, but was unable to complete the work (Pouihi) before his death in 1971.

== Honours ==
In the 1966 New Year Honours, Te Wiata was appointed a Member of the Order of the British Empire for services in the field of operatic singing.

== Death ==
Te Waita died of pancreatic cancer on 26 June 1971 in London. He was cremated and his ashes were returned to New Zealand. His tangi was held on Raukawa Marae, Ōtaki, and the event was photographed by the New Zealand photographer Ans Westra. His ashes were then scattered in the cemetery at Rangiātea Church, Ōtaki.

Te Wiata's archive of papers is held by the National Library of New Zealand.

In November 2007, a commemorative CD/DVD was published containing previously unreleased recordings as well as a documentary film of his carving and an interview with Spike Milligan.

== Filmography ==
Year	Title	Role	Notes
1954	The Seekers	Hongi Tepe	
1955	Man of the Moment	King of Tawaki	
1956	Pacific Destiny	Tauvela	
1960	Sands of the Desert	Fahid	
1962	In Search of the Castaways	Maori Chief	
1966	Sergeant Cork	Chief Tama	TV series - The Case of the Simple Savage

== Selected discography ==
- Waiata Maori, A Festival of Maori Song (1966)

== Notes and sources ==
- "Inia Te Waita" by Ziska Schwimmer; Te Ao Hou – The New World; No 23, July 1958
