= Rima Te Wiata =

New Zealand singer, comedian and actress

Rima Te Wiata MNZM
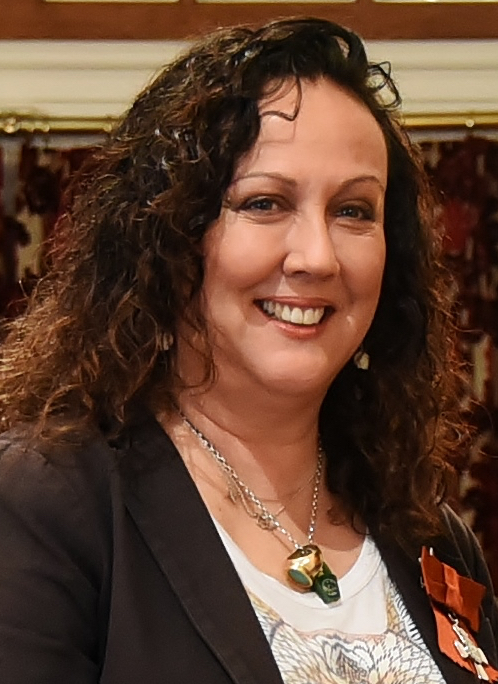
- Te Wiata in 2017
- Born: Heather Rima Te Wiata; 11 October 1963 (age 62); London, England
- Occupations: Actress; singer; director; designer; comedian; stage, film, and television actress; voice artist
- Years active: 1973−present
- Parent(s): Inia Te Wiata; Beryl Te Wiata

Heather Rima Te Wiata MNZM (born 11 October 1963) is a New Zealand actress, comedian, singer and voice artist, who is also notable for her career in Australia. Her career in stage, TV and film has spanned over 50 years and she is especially known her long-running recurring role in TV soap opera Sons and Daughters as Janice Reid in 204 episodes.

== Early life ==
Te Wiata was born in London, England, the only child of opera singer Inia Te Wiata and actress and writer Beryl Te Wiata, on 11 October 1963. She is of the Ngāti Raukawa iwi. Her father died when she was eight years old, and she and her mother returned to New Zealand two years later. They settled in Auckland, where Te Wiata attended Epsom Girls' Grammar School. After leaving school she initially wanted to become a dentist, and worked as a dentist's assistant.

== Career ==
Te Wiata has been a performer since the age of 10. Having sung in TV presenter's Max Cryer's children's choir, by 17 she made her stage debut in a production of The Prime of Miss Jean Brodie at Auckland's Mercury Theatre, and later attended the New Zealand Drama School. After graduating in 1983, she went on a six month national tour, singing in Footrot Flats.

She made her screen debut in 1986 on the long-running Australian soap Sons and Daughters, playing the role of Janice Reid for two years. On her return to New Zealand she appeared in a number of television series including Shortland Street, the police drama Shark in the Park, comedies The Billy T James Show and Porters, and sketch shows Laughinz, Issues and More Issues. Her roles in these sketch shows were written by David McPhail, Jon Gadsby and A. K. Grant and included impersonations of politician and future Prime Minister Helen Clark and newsreader Judy Bailey. The show won her the Viewers' Choice Most Popular Female on TV Award for two consecutive years, before she left the series in 1992.

Te Wiata next spent two years working on the Australian sketch comedy show Full Frontal and also began appearing in films, including Send a Gorilla (1988), Cops and Robbers (1993), Hinekaro Goes on a Picnic and Blows Up another Obelisk (1995) and Via Satellite (1998).

Te Wiata's stage appearances have included starring roles as Sally Bowles in Cabaret, Lady Macbeth in Macbeth, the voice of the cannibalistic singing plant in Little Shop of Horrors and directing and acting in The Vagina Monologues in Dunedin.

In 2014 she appeared in horror comedy Housebound and in 2016 in Hunt for the Wilderpeople.

In 2017, Te Wiata starred in season two of the podcast Within the Wires portraying artist and historian Roimata Mangakāhia.

In 2023 she appeared in four episodes of season 2 of The Wheel of Time.

Te Wiata has also released a self-titled jazz album, and toured with the New Zealand Symphony Orchestra.

== Honours and awards ==
In 2016, Te Wiata won the New Zealand Film Award for Best Supporting Actress for her role in Hunt for the Wilderpeople. In the 2017 New Year Honours, she was appointed a Member of the New Zealand Order of Merit, for services to film and television.

In October 2019 she was presented with a Scroll of Honour from the Variety Artists Club of New Zealand for her contribution to New Zealand entertainment.

== Filmography ==
Year	Title	Role	
1986–1987 (204 episodes)	Sons and Daughters	Janice Reid	TV series
1988	Send a Gorilla	Lisa	Film
1989–1990	Shark in the Park	Jacko	TV series
1990	1990: The Issues	Various characters	TV series
1991	Issues		TV series
1992	Alex	Female Commentator	Film
1992	More Issues	Various characters	TV series
1993–1994	Full Frontal	Various characters	TV series
1994	Kevin Rampenbacker and the Electric Kettle	Cop	
1995	Overnight	Mel	Film
1995–1997	Adventures of Cumie the Cloud	Voice artist	TV series
1997	H.M.S Pinafore	Mrs Cripps, known as Little Buttercup	TV movie
1998	Via Satellite	Jan	
2005	50 Ways of Saying Fabulous	Evey	
2007	Shortland Street	Liz Arthur	TV series
2008	Table Plays	Georgie	TV series
2011	Bliss	Miss Watson	
2014	Housebound	Miriam Bucknell	Film
2015	Tatsu	Budgie's Mum	TV miniseries
2016	Hunt for the Wilderpeople	Bella Faulkner	Film
2016	Terry Teo	Aunty Hinetu	TV series
2017	Joyride	Mrs. Davidson	
2016–2017	The Barefoot Bandits	Mamma Mia - Mamma Moa - TV Mum (voice)	
2017–2019	Within the Wires	Narrator	Podcast
2018	The Breaker Upperers	Shona	
2018	Tongue Tied	Aho	TV series
2019	Golden Boy	Carol	TV series
2020	This Town	Janice	
2018–2020	Westside	Iris	TV series
2021	The Tender Trap	Sharon Armstrong	
2022	My Life is Murder	Spencer	TV series
2019–2022	Kiri and Lou	Pania - Small- Lelamala (as voice)	TV series
2023	The Wheel of Time	Sheriam Bayaner	TV series
2024	We Were Dangerous	The Matron	Film
