= Dylan Marron =

American actor and writer

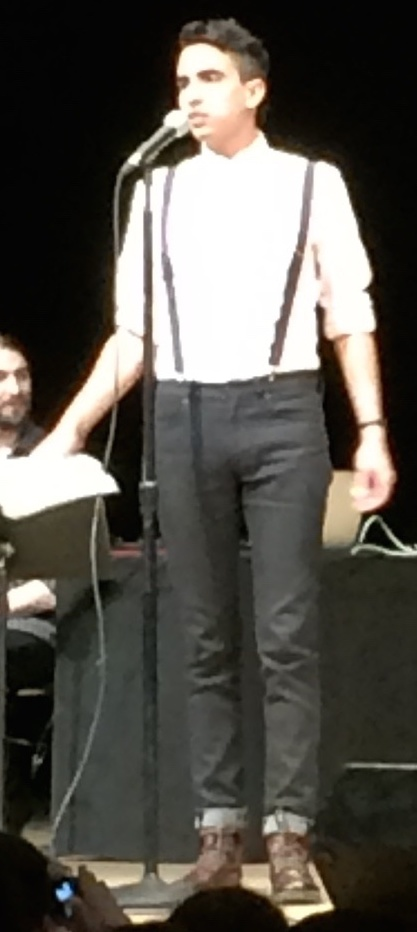
- Dylan Marron as Carlos the Scientist in a live episode of Welcome to Night Vale during their Atlanta 2019 tour
- Born: 31 May 1988 (age 38); Caracas, Venezuela
- Occupations: Writer and actor
- Years active: 1988–present
- Spouse: Todd Clayton (m. 2015)

Dylan Marron (born May 31, 1988) is an American actor, writer and activist known for his voice work as Carlos in the podcast Welcome to Night Vale and his video series Every Single Word, an art and data visualization project which compiles all the words spoken by people of color in major motion pictures. He is a writer on Ted Lasso.

== Early life ==
Marron was born May 31, 1988, in Caracas, Venezuela.

== Career ==
=== Acting ===
On Welcome to Night Vale, Marron plays Carlos the scientist, who is the main character's crush and later husband. Marron joined the podcast in 2013 and has appeared regularly since then, and has also featured in all the live shows. Prior to Marron's casting, Carlos was played by Jeffrey Cranor, one of the show's writers. Cranor stepped down from playing the role because, as a white man who is not an actor, he wanted to avoid standing in the way of a talented Latino actor playing a major role in his show. The Night Vale team and Marron knew each other via the Neo-Futurists, and Marron was a fan of the show before he was asked to play Carlos. His casting was well-received among fans of the show. Marron has spoken about the importance of Night Vale in showing that there is a large audience for media with a diverse and non-straight cast. In the show, Carlos is described as having "perfect hair," which Marron, who has curly, "gravity-defying" hair argues helps to redefine the racial politics of hair.

Marron played Ari in Whatever. This. Is., a Kickstarter-funded web series about working in reality television that aired during 2013. In the show, Marron plays a young production assistant with a terrible job. Of the role, Marron says, "I love seeing an out gay character who hasn't figured it all out. ... Ari not only feels flawed, but also a bit like he's still under construction." The show takes a nuanced approach to gay-relevant themes, including racism in the gay community. Marron brought his experience as a Neo-Futurist to the role. In the Neo-Futurists, performers take the stage as themselves. Marron describes playing Ari with authenticity: "When you're playing a character like that you just have to access what is true for them and if you want to apply that in the Neo-Futuristic way that I have begun to think about character is that you can't help but bring yourself into every role that you have."

With Jo Firestone, Marron wrote, performed in, and directed Ridgefield Middle School Talent Nite, a two-person show about a middle school talent show, in which each performer played several roles. The show received a Capital Fringe Festival Director's Award in 2010.

=== New York Neo-Futurists ===
Marron is a former member of the New York Neo-Futurists, an experimental theater group. As a participant in their long-running show, Too Much Light Makes the Baby Go Blind: 30 Plays in 60 Minutes, Marron developed a play in which the performers were audience members. He went on to develop this work into a longer, standalone show called The Human Symphony, which ran from January 22 - February 14, 2015. This show consists of stories about online dating. Marron invited six audience members onstage to perform stories while pre-recorded interviews about dating experiences play over the sound system. While audience members were not required to participate, they were asked to introduce themselves to fellow audience members during the show. The Human Symphony was nominated for a Drama Desk Award for Unique Theatrical Experience.

=== Video series ===
Marron stars in several video series produced by Seriously.tv, including Every Single Word, Shutting Down Bullshit, Unboxing, and Sitting in Bathrooms with Trans People.

In 2015 and 2016, Marron produced Every Single Word, a video project drawing attention to the lack of representation of people of color in popular films. In this series. Marron selects popular 1-2-hour films, identifies the lines spoken by people of color, and splices those lines together. The resulting clips are very brief, ranging from under ten seconds to fifteen minutes at the most. The project stems from Marron's experience being excluded from productions due to his race and sexuality. Marron chose to highlight the broader lack of people of color in popular film through this video series because he feels that "showing [patterns] without embellishment" is a more effective approach than writing rants about lack of representation. This film series focuses on stories that are not explicitly about race, to highlight how white people are chosen to tell universal stories, while people of color are either left out or cast in very minor roles.

His series, "Shutting Down Bullshit" is an interview show that tackles political myths about marginalized groups. It has featured topics such as mental health, antisemitism, undocumented immigration, and sex work. The series concluded with its thirty-fifth video in April, 2017. Advocates for autistic people criticized the episode about autism ("Shutting Down Bullshit about Autism," January 6, 2017) on the grounds that it reinforced harmful stereotypes about autism and focused more on the autistic interviewee's father's experience than his own. Marron issued an apology for this episode and recorded a follow-up episode in which he interviewed four autistic guests.

In "Sitting in Bathrooms with Trans People," Marron interviews trans people in public restrooms to protest bathroom bills. This show uses lighthearted gags such as toilet paper ribbon dancing to poke fun at rhetoric suggesting that trans people in public restrooms constitute a threat, but also includes serious conversations to educate viewers about trans issues. Marron, who is not trans but describes himself as an ally, hopes to "humanize the issue" with this series. Guests have included activist Kate Bornstein and YouTube personality Jackson Bird.

=== Conversations with People who Hate Me ===
Marron hosts a podcast titled Conversations with People who Hate Me, in which he contacts people who have left negative or hateful comments on his videos or social media. The first season of the podcast included nine episodes, all posted in 2017. The goal of this podcast is to "take hateful conversations online and turn them into productive conversations offline." This podcast was partially inspired by an episode of This American Life in which Lindy West confronts one of her trolls; Marron similarly wanted to engage in productive, nuanced conversations with his guests. Marron's goal is neither to debate his guests, nor to find common ground with them, but to listen to people and be listened to in return. Guests on the podcast are offered whatever level of anonymity they want, to facilitate their participation in the conversation. The podcast was featured as a "Podcast Pick" by USA Today. The podcast also won a Webby Award for best individual episode during the 2018 Webby Awards. The format changed in 2018, with the podcast's second season. Instead of interviewing his guests one on one, Marron moderates a conversation between two guests who have had negative online interactions with each other.

In 2022, Marron released a book based on the podcast entitled: "Conversations with People Who Hate Me: 12 Things I Learned from Talking to Internet Strangers."

== Personal life ==
Marron was born in Venezuela. He has been married to Todd Clayton since December 27, 2015.

Marron joined a sketch comedy group at Wesleyan University, not because he was interested in a career in comedy, but because he wanted to work collaboratively on creative endeavors with people who shared his enthusiasm for creative work. Through this sketch group, he met Jo Firestone, his coauthor for the play Ridgefield Middle School Talent Nite.
