= Welcome to Night Vale =

Supernatural fiction podcast

- Genre: Supernatural; surreal comedy; horror; deadpan; absurdism; mystery; news satire; magical realism
- Language: English

Creative team
- Created by: Joseph Fink; Jeffrey Cranor

Cast and voices
- Narrated by: Cecil Baldwin

Music
- Opening theme: "The Ballad of Fiedler and Mundt" (Years 1–3, 6–present) "The Ballad of Haydon and Prideaux" (Years 4 and 5)
- Ending theme: "The Ballad of Magnus and Axel"
- Composed by: Disparition

Production
- Length: 20–30 minutes

Publication
- No. of seasons: 12
- No. of episodes: Main series: 290; Live: 9; Bonus: 14
- Original release: June 15, 2012 – present

Related
- Website: welcometonightvale.com

Welcome to Night Vale is an absurdist supernatural fiction podcast created by Joseph Fink and Jeffrey Cranor. It is presented as a community radio show in the fictional American desert town of Night Vale, with the eccentric local radio host reporting on the bizarre and unnatural events that occur within it. The podcast stars Cecil Baldwin as radio host Cecil Gershwin Palmer, and occasionally features guest voices as secondary characters, including Dylan Marron, Jasika Nicole, Mara Wilson and Jackson Publick.

Night Vale originated as a production of the collaborative writing project Commonplace Books in 2012. After their success, the creators launched a podcast network in 2015 entitled Night Vale Presents which continues to produce the show, alongside others. The show has on occasion featured guest writers, particularly Brie Williams who has written a number of episodes. The cast also performs live shows in various venues, many of which have been released online as audio recordings.

The podcast has garnered a cult following and critical acclaim for its surreal humor and horror, and LGBTQ+ representation. Fink and Cranor have written three novels set in the podcast's universe: Welcome to Night Vale (2015), It Devours! (2017) and The Faceless Old Woman Who Secretly Lives in Your Home (2020). Additionally, the Night Vale staff went on to produce original podcasts through the Night Vale Presents network, such as Alice Isn't Dead (2016– 18).

== Premise ==
Welcome to Night Vale takes place in the fictional town of Night Vale, a desert town located somewhere in the southwestern United States. In this town, the myriad paranormal and supernatural occurrences are treated as mundane. For example, Cecil remarks on how there is a new dog park which the town council forbids anyone from entering, which he does not find strange. Fink describes the town as "a Southwestern commuter suburb with no place for anyone to commute to."

Welcome to Night Vale's plot consists of long-form storytelling. Individual episodes usually function as standalone narratives and only rarely contain significant developments in story line. The writers employ running jokes and plot arcs; for example, the Glow Cloud, one of the series' repeating characters, hypnotizes the townspeople with its colors and noxious gas, making people chant "ALL HAIL THE GLOW CLOUD," and becomes president of Night Vale's school board. Another running joke is the low survival rate of interns at the radio station; the only interns, former and present, who are currently alive include (in order of appearance) Cecil, Chad Bowinger, Dana Cardinal, Maureen, and Kareem.

Characters and narratives often emerge and develop slowly, while unrelated stories may combine to form new plot points. Major stories have included the development of a romantic relationship between Cecil and Carlos; the stranding of several characters, including Carlos, in a "desert otherworld"; the invasion of Night Vale by StrexCorp, a corporation based in Night Vale's rival town Desert Bluffs, and StrexCorp's eventual expulsion from Night Vale; the 2014 mayoral elections, with subsequent terrorist activities by failed mayoral candidates the Faceless Old Woman Who Secretly Lives in Your Home and Hiram McDaniels; and the complications surrounding McDaniels's subsequent imprisonment and trial. The series's fourth anniversary in June 2016 coincided with a two-part climax to the storyline of the invasion of Night Vale by mysterious strangers, led by a demonic beagle puppy accidentally summoned from Hell by Chad Bowinger, a former radio intern. The early plot point of a miniature city buried under the town's bowling alley resurfaced after this, in addition to the sporadic appearance of Huntokar, a deer-headed deity with connections to both the tiny city and Night Vale's unusual nature. More recent plot points include the resolution of the Blood Space War, the aging of Lee Marvin, the town being brought back into the normal flow of time, and the whereabouts of the missing Delta flight 18713.

=== Cast and characters ===
- Cecil Baldwin as Cecil Gershwin Palmer, the narrator of the podcast and the host of Night Vale's radio station. He is a gay Jewish man, described as "not too short or tall, not fat or too thin." His true age is unknown, as he references being alive for events hundreds of years in the past; however, time does not work correctly in Night Vale. Cecil adopts a cat named Khoshekh (Note: The word khoshekh (חושך) means "darkness" in Hebrew.) who is found floating in a stationary position in the station's men's bathroom. In the credits he is referred to as "The Voice of Night Vale."
- Dylan Marron as Carlos Robles, Cecil's scientist boyfriend and later husband. Described as having "perfect hair" and "teeth like a military cemetery," he initially comes to Night Vale as an outsider but soon integrates into the community through his relationship with Cecil. Cecil fawns over him for the first year of the podcast before they begin dating. They were married in the series's hundredth episode "Toast," and in the "A Spy in the Desert" live show, it was revealed that the couple had adopted a son named Esteban whom they had kept secret for two years.
- Jasika Nicole as Dana Cardinal, former Night Vale Community Radio Intern and former mayor of Night Vale. In the episode "The Sandstorm," she kills her double, an act that comes back to haunt her after Danas from parallel realities seek revenge on her in Year Six. To date, she is one of few people who have survived Night Vale Community Radio's internship program.
- Kevin R. Free as Kevin, Cecil's Desert Bluffs counterpart obsessed with blood and gore, offsetting his cheery disposition. He now lives in the Desert Otherworld, which he has named Desert Bluffs Too!, from which he continues to broadcast his radio program.
- Lauren Sharpe as Lauren Mallard, the former head of StrexCorp and current mayor of Desert Bluffs Too!, although in reality she is second-in-command to Kevin.
- Mara Wilson as the Faceless Old Woman Who Secretly Lives in Your Home, a former mayoral candidate and corporeal being who simultaneously lives in the homes of all Night Vale residents. She is the protagonist of the third Night Vale novel, The Faceless Old Woman Who Secretly Lives in Your Home.
- Jackson Publick as Hiram McDaniels, a literal five-headed dragon and former mayoral candidate. After attempting to assassinate the Mayor, four of his heads are placed on trial, excluding the Violet head, who worked to prevent the assassination.
- Retta as Josefina Ortiz, commonly known as Old Woman Josie, Cecil's dearest friend and formerly the only person in town to openly acknowledge the existence of Angels. She died in 2017.
- Hal Lublin as Steve Carlsberg, Cecil's brother-in-law whom he used to dislike, but now respects. Steve is one of the few people in Night Vale who sees past the City Council's lies and conspiracies, much to the annoyance of Cecil. His daughter Janice has spina bifida and is captain of her school's wheelchair basketball team.
- Symphony Sanders as Tamika Flynn, a well-read young woman formerly in charge of a teenage militia in the desert and currently the only member of the City Council that is not part of their one singular body.
- Maureen Johnson as Intern Maureen, Michelle's girlfriend and a disgruntled former Night Vale Community Radio intern and former commander of an army of Strangers.
- Kate Jones as Michelle Nguyen, Maureen's girlfriend and the owner of Dark Owl Records who disdains any music that is remotely popular.
- Mark Gagliardi as John Peters, a local farmer who specializes in growing imaginary corn. His brother was one of the many people taken by the Blood Space War.
- Desiree Burch as Pamela Winchell, the former mayor of Night Vale and current Head of Emergency Press Conferences.
- Emma Frankland as Sheriff Sam, who became sheriff of Night Vale after the previous sheriff mysteriously disappeared. They use they/them pronouns.
- Tina Parker as Huntokar the Destroyer, the deer-faced goddess who created Night Vale.
  - Parker also voices PTA president Susan Willman, whose consciousness merges with Huntokar after Wilman is chosen to hear the secrets of the bloodstone spire.
- Wil Wheaton as Earl Harlan, a local celebrity chef at the restaurant "Tourniquet." He is a childhood friend of Cecil, although he has difficulty remembering his past.
- Meg Bashwiner as Deb, a sentient patch of haze, who comes on the show to read advertisements. She has a sister named Caitlyn who is also voiced by Bashwiner.
  - Bashwiner also provides the voice of "Proverb Lady," who reads the credits at the end of every episode alongside a humorous proverb.
- James Urbaniak as Leonard Burton, the former host of Night Vale Community Radio and Cecil's childhood idol.
- Marc Evan Jackson as Marcus Vanston, an extraordinarily wealthy Night Vale citizen who was turned into an Angel during the mayoral debate.
- Molly Quinn as Melony Pennington, a computer programming prodigy.
  - Quinn also voices Fey, a computer program from the radio station WZZZ that reads random numbers of an unknown purpose, but eventually becomes sentient.
- Felicia Day as Joanna Rey, a shapeshifting zookeeper.
- Jason Webley as Louie Blasko, the former owner of Louie's Music Shop before it burned down and he skipped town with the insurance money. His ghost sometimes returns to Night Vale to teach lessons.
- Annie Savage as Diane Crayton, the treasurer of the Night Vale PTA and the mother of shape-shifter Josh Crayton. She is one of the main protagonists of the 2015 novel Welcome to Night Vale.
- Joseph Fink as various characters:
  - Teddy Williams, the owner of the Desert Flower Bowling Alley and Arcade Fun Complex, which used to house a parallel dimension of tiny people under Lane 5.
  - Josh Crayton, Diane's shapeshifter son who takes the form of a "Thirty-something podcast writer" during the "All Hail" live show.
  - Intern Joseph in "The Investigators" live show.
  - Telly the Barber in the "A Spy in the Desert" live show.
  - Jacobin McPhee in the episode "The Veterans"
  - A fictionalized version of himself in the episodes "Listener Questions" and "Salmon Burger."
- Aliee Chan as Basimah Bashara, a young Muslim woman whose father has been away fighting the Blood Space War for most of her life.
- Dessa as Sabina, Cecil's pregnant cousin.
- Hunter Canning as Hugh Jackman, the owner of the new technology start up company eGemony who shares his name with the famous actor.
- Lusia Strus as Missy Wilkes, a Night Vale citizen and former Playboy Playmate.
- Erica Livingston and Christopher Loar as Maggie and Donald Penebaker, a husband and wife who serve as the voices of the phone tree menus for all services in Night Vale.
- Flor De Liz Perez as Lacy Hernez, a representative for the Night Vale Department of Water.
- Jeffrey Cranor as Charles, Carlos's Desert Bluffs counterpart. He is a theologist and Kevin's boyfriend.
  - Cranor also voiced Carlos in his first appearance, the Secret Police Spokesperson in "The Investigators" live show, Lee Marvin in the "A Spy in the Desert" live show, Harrison Kip in "The Haunting of Night Vale" live show, and a fictionalized version of himself in the episode "Listeners."
- TL Thompson as Lee Marvin, Night Vale's most local celebrity who has been perpetually having his 30th birthday since time immemorial. He is responsible for time in Night Vale being put back to normal in the Year Seven finale.
- Rob Neill as Kasper Rhodes, a businessman in town who offers to freeze people's brains after they die with the intent of achieving immortality.
- Robin Virgine as Radio Jupiter, a mysterious broadcast from a distant star.
- Julia Morizawa as Lucy in Claremont, a caller in to the show.
- Janet Varney as Megan Wallaby, a young woman who was born as an adult man's disembodied hand, who was later given to a middle-aged body donor missing his left hand. In 2021 her body is killed, leaving her a disembodied hand once more. She now lives in a tarantula den with her spider husband.
  - Varney also voices Dr. Janet Lubell, a researcher from the University of What It Is
- Jonathan Atkinson as Silas, a former art thief who was turned into a cat by his partner through magic. In his current life he is Cecil’s pet cat Khoshekh, who he found floating in the men’s bathroom at the station.
- Adal Rifai, John Patrick Coan, and Erin Keif as Kareem, Doug, and Gina. They are the hosts of The Kareem Nazari Show, a fictional broadcast in-universe airing from WMCG 1080 AM in Ann Arbor, Michigan. In real life Rifai, Coan, and Keif are the co-hosts of the podcast Hey Riddle Riddle.
- Mal Blum as Big Rico, the owner of Big Rico's Pizza.
- T.D. Mischke as Frank Luna, a radio host from Vermillion Falls, Night Vale's sister city located south of Minneapolis, a town overrun with wolfmen.
- Ashlie Atkinson as Abby Palmer, Cecil's older sister.
- In the live show "The Librarian," Andrew WK, James Urbaniak, Molly Quinn, and Wil Wheaton all perform the same monologue as a new intern at the station, but on different days of the tour.

== Production ==
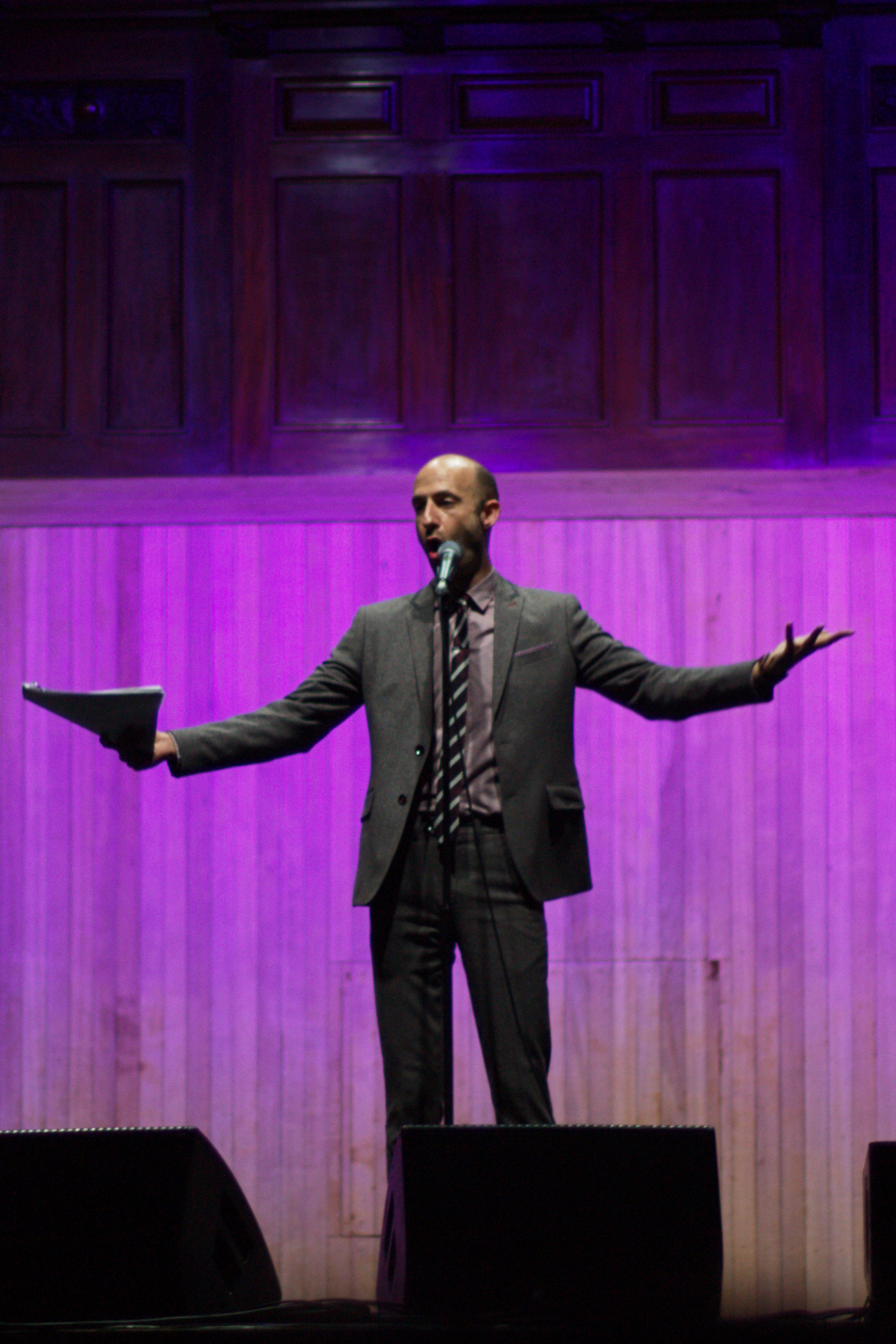
Cecil Baldwin as Cecil in the live episode "The Investigators" during the 2015 UK tour.

In an interview with NPR, Joseph Fink said that he "came up with this idea of a town in that desert where all conspiracy theories were real, and we would just go from there with that understood." The show initially operated on a shoe-string budget, with Fink lending Baldwin a $25 microphone to do his first recordings.

Every episode of the podcast includes a piece of music as "the weather," each by a different independently published artist. The theme and background instrumental music to the series were created by the musician and composer Disparition.

In October 2013, Welcome to Night Vale began presenting live shows, which continued into 2014 with a tour of the West Coast. In addition, it was announced during the episode "The Auction" that a novel would be published in 2015. Fink stated that "it's going to have all the characters and weird atmosphere that you want from Night Vale, with a brand new story that explores parts of Night Vale that we just haven't been able to get into with the podcast." When the book became available for preorder the following March, it became Amazon's number-two title seven months ahead of its October release date.

== Years ==
The podcast is divided into "years", which act akin to seasons. Generally each year has several long running plot threads. Since 2015 a consistent schedule has been maintained, with a 20 episode year running from August to the following June, and a break each July.

Years
No.	Began	Ended	Episodes	Main plot threads
1	15 June 2012	15 June 2013	1-25	Cecil's feelings for Carlos the scientist
2	1 July 2013	1 July 2014	26-49	Strex Corp's occupation of Night Vale, the Smiling God and the unraveling of all things
3	15 July 2014	15 July 2015	50-70	Misuse of Lot 37, the disputed mayoral election and the opening of the new Old Opera House
4	1 August 2015	15 June 2016	71-90	The Beagle puppy, the strangers and the trial into Hiram's involvement in the coup attempt
5	1 August 2016	15 June 2017	91-110	Huntokar, the events of 1983, the dragons' anger at Hiram's sentence and the existence of angels
6	1 August 2017	15 June 2018	111-130	Tamika Flynn's rule, the lost case of Canadian Club and the fate of Dana's double
7	1 August 2018	15 June 2019	131-150	The Blood Space War, Lee Marvin's 30th birthday and the nature of time in Night Vale
8	1 August 2019	15 June 2020	151-170	A break-in at the Last Bank of Night Vale, Cryonics, and the disappearance of Delta flight 18713
9	1 August 2020	15 June 2021	171-190	The inquiry into secret police mishandling of Hiram's 2012 murder of Frank Chen
10	1 August 2021	15 June 2022	191-210	The origins of Khoshekh, wider awareness of Night Vale in the global public, and Kareem's double
11	1 August 2022	15 June 2023	211-230	TBC
12	1 August 2023	15 June 2024	231-250	TBC
13	1 August 2024	15 June 2025	251-270	TBC
14	1 August 2025	15 June 2026	271-290	TBC

== Guest writers ==
Night Vale is normally written by Joseph Fink and Jeffery Cranor, along with Brie Williams who joined as a co-writer from 2016. Guest writers have on occasion been employed, either in the form of short segments (such as the listener-submitted poems of episode 20, "Poetry Week"), or entire episodes. The show ceased using guest writers in late 2017.

"additional material" credits marked with an asterisk (*)
Name	Episodes
Katherine Ciel	20*
Dessa	113
Danielle DuBois	20*
Glen David Gold	37, 39*, 117–119
Vanessa Irena	20*
Calvin Kasulke	236
Regic Laher	9*
Ashley Lierman	28, 50, Bonus Episode 1
James Moran	91
Zach Parsons	18, 34, 40*, 79
Erika Paschold	20*
Marta Rainerz	Bonus Episode 2
Russel Swenson	20*, 29
Trilety Wade	20*

== Books ==
=== Welcome to Night Vale: A Novel ===
In October 2015, Fink and Cranor released a mystery novel by the name of the podcast, Welcome to Night Vale. It is told primarily from the viewpoints of Night Vale citizens Jackie Fierro and Diane Crayton, both minor characters on the podcast, who investigate two mysteries that bring their lives closer together. The audiobook is narrated by Cecil Baldwin, Dylan Marron, Retta, Thérèse Plummer, and Dan Bittner.

The story is canon to the podcast and its events were followed up within it in the episode "An Epilogue," which was aired before the novel was released. Critical reception for the book has been positive, with many praising it for its witty prose and engaging mysteries.

=== It Devours! ===
In the March 15, 2017 episode of the podcast, Fink announced a second novel, titled It Devours!, which follows young scientist Nilanjana Sikdar investigating the Joyous Congregation of the Smiling God. It was released October 17, 2017. The audiobook is narrated by Cecil Baldwin.

=== The Faceless Old Woman Who Secretly Lives in Your Home ===
In the September 15, 2019 episode of the podcast it was announced that the third Night Vale novel, The Faceless Old Woman Who Secretly Lives in Your Home, would be released on March 24, 2020. The novel was once again co-written by Fink and Cranor, and focuses on the backstory of the title character. The audiobook is narrated by Mara Wilson, who provides the voice of the Faceless Old Woman on the podcast.

=== Script books ===
To date, Welcome to Night Vale has released four books featuring scripts from the show as well as commentary, introductions by the authors and original illustrations. Each book corresponds to a season (or year) of the podcast.

Volume	Title	Episodes	Release date	ISBN
1	Mostly Void, Partially Stars	1–25	September 6, 2016	9780356508603
2	The Great Glowing Coils of the Universe	26–49	September 6, 2016	9780062468635
3	The Buying of Lot 37	50–70	May 14, 2019	9780062798091
4	Who's a Good Boy?	71–90	May 14, 2019	9780062798114

== Reception ==
The show has been described as "the news from Lake Wobegon as seen through the eyes of Stephen King," and Christopher Wynn of The Dallas Morning News characterized it as "NPR meets The Mothman Prophecies." The Daily Dot's Gavia Baker-Whitelaw compared the podcast to being "caught somewhere between Weird Twitter and 'Tales of the Unexplained'" and said that it is "well worth a listen—although possibly not after dark, if you live in a small town yourself." Colin Griffith of The A.V. Club said the show is "really well done, offering a surrealist/absurdist (and occasionally existentialist) take on community radio, with dispatches from the small, delectably nightmarish desert town of Night Vale." Writing for TechGeek, Erin Hill considered the uniqueness of the podcast to be "its presentation of what is ordinary," adding that "many of the things that Cecil reports goes against our idea of normal, but [everything] is presented in a manner that makes it seem mundane."

In July 2013, Welcome to Night Vale was ranked second on the top ten audio podcasts list on iTunes, behind radio program This American Life. During the same month, it surpassed This American Life to become first on the podcasts list, having received 150,000 downloads during a single week.

In December 2013, The A.V. Club ranked the show seventh on its Best Podcasts of 2013 list.

Co-producer Jeffrey Cranor attributed this spike in popularity to both Tumblr and fans of the television series Hannibal. Max Sebela, a creative strategist for Tumblr, stated that the fan following began to "spiral out of control" beginning on July 5, with that week having "20,000-plus posts about 'Night Vale,' with 183,000-plus individual blogs participating in the conversation, and 680,000-plus notes." The Twitter account for the podcast has been noted as having more than 20,000 followers by July 2013.

According to The Daily Dot, new listeners primarily come through fan following and word of mouth primarily on Tumblr with fan fiction and fan art focusing on the romantic relationship between the show's narrator and scientist Carlos. Fans have published "fanscripts," transcripts of the podcast, in order to widen the accessibility of Welcome to Night Vale.

On October 15, 2015, producers Joseph Fink and Jeffrey Cranor were interviewed on The Late Show with Stephen Colbert, and Cecil Baldwin appeared for a Community Calendar public service message for Night Vale. Mike Rugnetta, in the web show PBS Idea Channel, compared the podcast to horror writer H. P. Lovecraft's writing about fear of the unknown: "But Night Vale turns Lovecraft's 'unimaginable terror' into 'drab mundanity.'"

=== Awards ===
Award	Year	Category	Recipient	Result	Ref.
Audio Verse Awards	2014	Best Writing of an Ongoing Original Long-Form Production	Joseph Fink and Jeffrey Cranor	Won	
Audio Verse Awards	2014	Best Audio Engineering in an Ongoing Original Production	Joseph Fink	Won	
Audio Verse Awards	2014	Best Actor in an Original Leading Role	Cecil Baldwin	Won	
Audio Verse Awards	2015	Best Actor with a Minor Role in an Original Serial Production	Jackson Publick as Hiram McDaniels	Won	
Audio Verse Awards	2015	Best Actor with a Supporting Role in an Original, Long-Form, Serial Production	Dylan Marron as Carlos	Won	
Audio Verse Awards	2015	Best Actor with a Leading Role in an Original, Long-Form, Serial Production	Cecil Baldwin as Cecil Gershwin Palmer	Won	
Audio Verse Awards	2015	Best Writing of an Original, Long-Form, Serial Production	Joseph Fink and Jeffrey Cranor	Finalist	
Audio Verse Awards	2015	Best Actor with a Supporting Role in an Original, Long-Form, Serial Production	Kevin R. Free as Kevin	Finalist	
Audio Verse Awards	2015	Best Original, Long-Form, Small Cast, Serial Production	Welcome to Night Vale	Finalist	
Audio Verse Awards	2016	Best Original, Short Form, Small Cast, Ongoing, Comedic Production	Welcome to Night Vale	Won	
British Fantasy Awards	2016	The August Derleth Award for Best horror novel	Joseph Fink and Jeffrey Cranor for Welcome to Night Vale (novel)	Nominated	
Discover Pods Awards	2017	Best Audio Drama	Welcome to Night Vale	Won	
iHeartRadio Podcast Awards	2019	Best Scripted Podcast	Welcome to Night Vale	Nominated	
iHeartRadio Podcast Awards	2020	Best Fiction Podcast	Welcome to Night Vale	Nominated	
iHeartRadio Podcast Awards	2021	Best Fiction Podcast	Welcome to Night Vale	Nominated	
iHeartRadio Podcast Awards	2022	Best Fiction Podcast	Welcome to Night Vale	Nominated	
Shorty Awards	2015	Podcast	Welcome to Night Vale	Finalist	

== Adaptations ==
In December 2017, it was announced that writer and producer Gennifer Hutchison was adapting Welcome to Night Vale for television, with Fink and Cranor serving as executive producers. The series was to be by Sony Pictures Television, where Hutchison has an overall deal, and developed for FX. In 2023, Fink and Cranor announced on Patreon that despite writing a pilot episode, a key figure had departed production and thus the show was indefinitely postponed.

== See also ==
- Limetown
- The Magnus Archives
- Scarfolk
- SCP Foundation
