= Cormac McCarthy and the Signs of Sacrament =

2015 book by Matthew Ichihashi Potts]

- Author: Matthew Ichihashi Potts
- Language: English
- Subject: Cormac McCarthy’s fiction
- Published: 2015
- Publisher: Bloomsbury Publishing
- Media type: Print
- Pages: 224
- ISBN: 9781501330735

Cormac McCarthy and the Signs of Sacrament: Literature, Theology, and the Moral of Stories is a 2015 book by Matthew Ichihashi Potts which deals with the religious elements in Cormac McCarthy’s fiction.

== Reception ==
The book was reviewed by Mark Steven, Rachel B. Griffis, Michael Murphy, Nicholas Monk, Todd Edmondson, Nicholas Lawrence, and Jade Becker.

Becker believes that the book does not attempt to resolve those ambiguities that McCarthy’s work leaves unresolvable, and Potts’s tolerance for the mystery and opacity that accompanies novels like Blood Meridian, No Country for Old Men, and The Road speaks further to his ability to avoid the reductivism of purely religious or antireligious readings. The field of McCarthy studies will surely benefit from such a nuanced meditation as is found in Potts’s work. Potts intervenes in current McCarthy criticism by complicating previous readings that would subordinate his work’s strange, distinctive spirituality to other, more purely aesthetic goals or qualities. Through expert harmonizations of theological, literary, and theological voices, Potts places the sacramental in conversation with the postmodern in a way that bolsters both and compromises neither. Further, the framework of sacramental theology that Potts delineates throughout expands and complicates the existential and aesthetic readings offered by critics like Vereen Bell and Jay Ellis by suggesting that McCarthy’s work has not abandoned the search for an interpersonal ethics. In this way, Potts’s book initiates a vital re-description of McCarthy’s ethos, and lays the groundwork for more focused considerations of how the language and action of spirituality and religion occupy the narrative worlds he creates.

== Content ==
Matthew Potts examines the peculiar prevalence of spirituality in works of fiction which seems to so vividly chart the loss of meaning “in light of metaphysical collapse” (14). Much recent work that grapples with this paradox, Potts contends, is reductive, failing to “adequately theorize McCarthy’s clear ambivalence around religion” in both religious and antireligious readings (1). In the light of Vereen Bell's existential reading of McCarthy's novels as rejecting religious belief but retaining a “pressure of meaningfulness” (qtd. p3), Potts claims that critics who emphasize the Christian undertones in McCarthy's work tend to oversimplify both McCarthy and Christian theology.

Potts's crucial intervention comes in his focused attention to how sacramentality works as the main cohering agent between the existential, aesthetic, and religious thematics of McCarthy's later work (Potts focuses on the fiction from Suttree onward). The theology of sacraments, as Potts describes it, does not simply introduce “the holy into a profane world”; instead, it recognizes a “holiness embodied in the quotidian” (13). To Christian thinkers like Martin Luther, Thomas Aquinas, and John Wycliffe, Potts contends, “there is a sacredness in, with, and under the profane” (13). In light of this, sacramental actions intervene in a world of signs and signifieds by suggesting a connection between action and meaning. Termed “visible words” by Augustine, sacraments are “signifying actions” that “do what they say”—in other words, “the sacramental sign effects the reality it signifies” (11). Thus, acts of love such as we see in The Road do not just indicate the father's love for his son; they are that love. Potts thereby posits that occasional, performative acts of promise and forgiveness in otherwise dark novels like No Country for Old Men and Blood Meridian hold the possibility to change the constitution of the world and break its putatively inherent trends of violence.

The final chapter, “Sacrament,” excavates the role of the sacramental images that grace the pages of The Road. It is here that Potts's use of critics like Judith Butler, Adriana Cavarero, and Hannah Arendt finally coheres with the diverse theological voices of Karl Barth, Hans Frei, and others to suggest that The Road develops an ethics that emerges from a Christ-like dispossession; that is, from the sacramental act of giving oneself over to others.

Potts devotes the first two chapters to No Country for Old Men and Blood Meridian, arguing that while McCarthy displays a strong skepticism against organized religion, he also builds a weighty critique of the instrumentalized reason we see utilized by those novels’ villains. Potts draws heavily on Nietzsche here, and his analysis corrects earlier Nietzschean readings of the villains of these novels. Though at first Judge Holden appears to resemble Zarathustra, Potts argues that in reality the Judge embodies the very religiosity Nietzsche critiques, recapitulating the ascetic ideal in his assumption of godhood and his worship of science and reason. Likewise, though on the surface Anton Chigurh of No Country for Old Men enacts a Nietzschean critique of morality, appearing to critics like Jay Ellis as “one more chanced event in the world,” in Pott's reading of Chigurh ultimately defies the flat determinism he seems to champion (42). He finally “retains [his] agency” and unwittingly participates in a system of morality (42). Potts's argument marks a significant turn from common understandings of McCarthy's villains, which take Holden and Chigurh to be embracing a “postmodern groundlessness” (43). Instead, Potts claims, Holden and Chigurh end up becoming “narcissistic savants of metaphysical nihilism” rather than enlightened Nietzscheans (50). Potts draws on Arendt to suggest that McCarthy's novels combat the villains’ false determinism and willed violence through moments in which promise and forgiveness subvert the unpredictability and irrevocability of human action.

This is followed by an examination of the role of action in Suttree, which Potts takes “as a whole to be a critique of the spiritual rejection or replacement of material reality” (87). Though some critics have taken the novel's opaque narrative style either as a weakness or as a strategy to “mimic the manner by which blight and police brutality [objectify characters],” Potts contends that the corporeality of McCarthy's writing—the emphasis on embodied acts over interior thought—speaks to the externality of the human self and its realization through action (95). In this way, the externality of the narration in Suttree not only evokes Arendt's writings on action, but also Scripture, wherein descriptions of one's interiority are avoided such that one's actions appear to constitute the self. Here we begin to see more clearly how McCarthy's fiction seems to function under a sacramental logic: for Potts, human action in Suttree is not simply a sign of the self, it constitutes the self. In the same way, the sacramental sign “effects the reality it signifies” (11). Rather than suggest that the materiality of the worlds McCarthy constructs renders them wholly deterministic, Potts suggests that McCarthy's fiction ultimately preserves the possibility of human agency, and, by extension, ethics.

Potts then turns his attention to the significance of story in the Border trilogy, exploring further how narrative might serve “as a loose, shifting, but viable foundation for morality” (122). Arendt is again a significant voice in this discussion, as Potts uses the Border novels to illustrate the way narrative can function as an ethical force. What elevates his analysis, however, is his additional integration of Judith Butler's notion of an ethics of dispossession, as developed in Giving An Account of Oneself. Out of the “fundamentally dispossessing ethics” that emerges from the sort of storytelling we see in the Border novels, McCarthy advocates alongside Butler and Cavarero for the relationality and narratability of the self (144). The relationality that emerges from these stories facilitates a move toward ethics, Potts-through-Butler argues, because it exposes the way the self is necessarily implicated in the life of the Other.

The dispossession of the self plays an important role in the book's final chapter, in which sacramental theology moves from the background to the foreground of Potts's argument, and he relies on the repetition of images of Eucharist and baptism in The Road to signal the centrality of sacraments to McCarthy's project in the novel. Of particular importance to Potts is how the subjectivity of the father in The Road is realized through this self-dispossession, and evokes the self-emptying subject formation of Jesus Christ, who left his divinity for humanity, his humanity to become a corpse. Read as sacramental acts, these moments of dispossession are the love they signify. By ignoring—or simply failing to notice—the recurrence of these sacramental images throughout the novel, many critics have tended toward oversimplifying the relationship between the father and the son. For these critics, the allusions to Biblical or mystical narratives often serve as loose, nostalgic metaphors for a lost moral order. But for Potts, recognizing the sacramental quality of the father's self-dispossession enables a “more subtle reading, one which recalls the religious but without any hollow proclamation of redemption” (182). There is some hope to be found in the fact that the father's sacrifice is not a mere sign, pointing “beyond [itself] to some greater value”; rather, his self-dispossessing sacrifice “realize[s] that value” (172).
