= I Love Dick (TV series) =

American television series

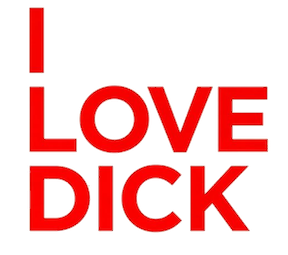
- Created by: Sarah Gubbins; Joey Soloway
- Based on: I Love Dick by Chris Kraus
- Starring: Kevin Bacon; Kathryn Hahn; Griffin Dunne; Roberta Colindrez; Lily Mojekwu
- Country of origin: United States
- Original language: English
- No. of seasons: 1
- No. of episodes: 8

Production
- Executive producers: Joey Solloway; Sarah Gubbins; Andrea Sperling; Victor Hsu
- Camera setup: Single-camera
- Running time: 32 minutes
- Production companies: Topple Productions; Picrow; Amazon Studios

Original release
- Network: Amazon Prime Video
- Release: August 19, 2016 – May 12, 2017

I Love Dick is an American television series released on Amazon Prime. Based on the novel of the same name by Chris Kraus, it was created by Joey Soloway and Sarah Gubbins. The pilot premiered on August 19, 2016, and the first season was released on May 12, 2017. On January 17, 2018, the series was canceled after one season due to failure to connect with a limited audience.

== Plot ==
Chris (Kathryn Hahn) is a struggling New York City-based artist and filmmaker who accompanies her husband Sylvère (Griffin Dunne) to Marfa, Texas, where he is taking up a research fellowship. Upon arrival in Marfa, Chris quickly becomes infatuated with Sylvère's fellowship sponsor Dick (Kevin Bacon). Her infatuation becomes articulated in un-delivered letters to him which are filled with unbounded sexually explicit desires. Her contentious and frustrating interactions with Dick as well as the writing of her confessional letters to him begin to affect her attitudes towards her marriage, work, and confidence as an artist and person.

== Cast ==
=== Main ===
- Kathryn Hahn as Chris Kraus
- Kevin Bacon as Dick
- Griffin Dunne as Sylvère Lotringer
- Roberta Colindrez as Devon
- Lily Mojekwu as Paula

=== Recurring ===
- Bobbi Menuez as Toby
- Sherry Cola as Natalie
- Sebastian Cole as Lawrence
- Erik Alvarez as Sonny
- Leo Lungaro as Rod
- Rochelle Robinson as Helen

== Episodes ==
| No. | Title | Directed by | Written by | Original release date |
|---|---|---|---|---|
| 1 | "Pilot" | Joey Soloway (Note: Credited as Jill Soloway; they changed their name to Joey Soloway in 2020.) | Teleplay by : Sarah Gubbins | August 19, 2016 |
| 2 | "The Conceptual Fuck" | Kimberly Peirce | Sarah Gubbins | May 12, 2017 |
| 3 | "Scenes from a Marriage" | Andrea Arnold | Heidi Schreck | May 12, 2017 |
| 4 | "Ilinx" | Andrea Arnold | Carla Ching | May 12, 2017 |
| 5 | "A Short History of Weird Girls" | Joey Soloway | Annie Baker & Heidi Schreck | May 12, 2017 |
| 6 | "This Is Not a Love Letter" | Jim Frohna | Esti Giordani & Diona Reasonover | May 12, 2017 |
| 7 | "The Barter Economy" | Andrea Arnold | Dara Resnik | May 12, 2017 |
| 8 | "Cowboys and Nomads" | Andrea Arnold | Sarah Gubbins & Heidi Schreck | May 12, 2017 |

== Reception ==
=== Critical response ===
I Love Dick has been met with generally positive reviews from critics. The review aggregation website Rotten Tomatoes gives the series an approval rating of 88%, based on 57 reviews, with an average rating of 7.77/10. The site's critical consensus reads, "Adult in the best way, I Love Dick expands the scope of its source material while offering smart, provocative, and funny observations on sexuality and gender roles." Metacritic awarded season one a score of 73 based on 29 critics, denoting "generally favorable" reviews.

=== Awards and nominations ===
| Year | Award | Category | Nominee | Result | Ref. |
|---|---|---|---|---|---|
| 2018 | 75th Golden Globe Awards | Best Performance by an Actor in a Television Series - Musical or Comedy | Kevin Bacon | Nominated | |
| 2018 | 8th Guild of Music Supervisors Awards | Best Music Supervision in a Television Musical or Comedy | Bruce Gilbert | Nominated | |
| 2018 | 22nd Satellite Awards | Best Actress in a Musical or Comedy Series | Kathryn Hahn | Nominated | |
