= Matthew Ichihashi Potts =

American theologian

- Spouse: Colette Potts
- Children: 3

Academic background
- Education: Harvard University (PhD), Harvard Divinity School (MDiv), University of Notre Dame (BA)

Academic work
- Institutions: Harvard Divinity School

Matthew Ichihashi Potts is an American theologian and preacher. He is Plummer Professor of Christian Morals at Harvard Divinity School and Pusey Minister in the Memorial Church of Harvard University. Potts is known for his works on the Christian theology, Christian ethics, and contemporary American literature. He is a co-host of the podcast Harry Potter and the Sacred Text.

== Books ==
- Cormac McCarthy and the Signs of Sacrament: Literature, Theology, and the Moral of Stories, Bloomsbury 2015
- Forgiveness: An Alternative Account, Yale University Press 2022
