= I Love Dick =

1997 book by Chris Kraus

- Author: Chris Kraus
- Language: English
- Publisher: Semiotext(e)
- Publication date: 1997
- Publication place: United States

I Love Dick is an epistolary novel with autofiction elements by American artist and author Chris Kraus. It was published in 1997 by Semiotext(e).

I Love Dick merges fiction and memoir formats to explore the writer's psycho-sexual obsession with the eponymous "Dick", a media theorist and sociologist whose last name is never given over the course of the text, despite other art world personalities appearing as themselves. Critics hailed it as both "radical" and "gossipy". The book announced Kraus' particular brand of "confessional literature" that she herself described as "lonely girl phenomenology". American writer Rick Moody called it "one of the most explosive, revealing, lacerating and unusual memoirs ever committed to the page".

I Love Dick is written as a series of love letters written to an addressee who is derived from the real-life cultural critic Dick Hebdige. Hebdige described the novel as a violation of his privacy. "Dick"'s sporadic presence in "Chris Kraus"'s life changes her thinking about her marriage (to philosopher and Semiotext(e) founder "Sylvère Lotringer") and to her work, as well.

The Guardian described the novel as "a cult feminist classic" despite its poor reception on release in 1997.

In 2016, Joey Soloway (Note: Was credited as Jill Soloway at the time; they changed their name to Joey Soloway in 2020.) adapted the novel as a television series, produced by Amazon Studios. The first season was released on May 12, 2017. It was directed by Joey Soloway and stars Kathryn Hahn and Kevin Bacon.
