= Harry Potter and the Sacred Text =

Podcast by Vanessa Zoltan et al. (2016-)

- Genre: Religion and spirituality podcast
- Language: English

Cast and voices
- Hosted by: Vanessa Zoltan; Casper Ter Kuile (season 1 and later guest); Matthew Potts (season 2); Ariana Nedelman (guest); Stephanie Paulsell (guest); John Green (guest); Scott Perlo (guest)

Music
- Composed by: Ivan Pyzow and Nick Bohl

Production
- Production: Ariana Nedelman; Casper Ter Kuile; Vanessa Zoltan
- Length: 30–60 minutes

Technical specifications
- Audio format: Podcast Talk Show

Publication
- No. of seasons: 14
- No. of episodes: 541
- Original release: May 19, 2016 – February 19, 2026
- Provider: Not Sorry Productions
- Updates: Weekly

Related
- Related shows: Women of Harry Potter and the Sacred Text
- Website: harrypottersacredtext.com

Harry Potter and the Sacred Text is an audio podcast founded by Vanessa Zoltan, Casper Ter Kuile, and Ariana Nedelman, and hosted by Vanessa Zoltan and Matt Potts, in which the Harry Potter books are read as a sacred text. Each episode, the characters and context of one chapter in the Harry Potter series are explored through a different central theme like 'vulnerability', 'betrayal', or 'friendship'. The podcast, which charted #2 on the US iTunes Charts a few months after its inception in 2016, was described as "Bible studies for J.K. Rowling fans". The creators condemned Rowling's views on transgender people, which became apparent from 2019. Over its decade-long run the hosts read through the complete series twice, and concluded the show in February 2026.

== History ==
The project originated at Harvard Divinity School, where both founders studied and shared an interest in religion without God - with Vanessa Zoltan describing herself as "an atheist and a Jew and a humanist" and Casper Ter Kuile training as a minister for non-religious people. The inspiration for the podcast was a lecture by Zoltan on reading Jane Eyre as a sacred text, which Ter Kuile attended. As a fan of the Harry Potter books, he persuaded Zoltan to attempt to apply the same method of sacred reading to Harry Potter.

In 2015, the duo started a weekly book club in the off-campus Humanist Hub. They chose the Harry Potter series because of its wide cultural reach and its coverage of life's big questions - like love, friendship, family and loss - with Ter Kuile noting that Harry Potter is "often a text that people turn to in real times of trouble".

When the book club grew in popularity and gained interest internationally, Zoltan and Ter Kuile decided to turn their project into a podcast. Harvard Divinity student Ariana Nedelman, an experienced digital producer, was enlisted to help make the transition from book club to podcast production. A Kickstarter project was set up to fund the production, which successfully raised $3,549 - exceeding their original $3,000 goal.

=== Second season and revised cast ===
On April 17, 2020, it was announced that after the podcast went through all seven books, the podcast would return to Harry Potter and the Sorcerer's Stone again and read through the series a second time. With this announcement came the news that after Harry Potter and the Deathly Hallows was finished on the podcast, the host Casper Ter Kuile would be leaving, and the podcast would instead be hosted by Vanessa Zoltan and Matt Potts, an Episcopal Priest and an associate professor of Religion and Literature and of Ministry Studies at Harvard Divinity School, who has visited the show as a guest on numerous occasions.

In response to Rowling's views on transgender people, which became increasingly clear over the course of the year, the podcast aired a special episode in 2020 featuring voice mails from transgender and non-binary listeners. The hosts announced that the show would no longer be financially supporting Rowling in any way- such as by attending the Orlando attractions for show content. They contemplated cancelling the second season, though it did go ahead.

On November 28, 2024, it was announced on Instagram that Potts would be stepping back from his role as co-host, and that Ter Kuile would be returning for the second series' reading of Harry Potter and the Deathly Hallows. In the podcast episode published the same day, Zoltan also announced that the podcast would not be returning for a third season. After season two concluded, one final re-read of the first chapter of the original book aired as a farewell episode on February 19, 2026.

== Format ==
The podcast follows the composition of the Harry Potter book series; each regular podcast episode covers a chapter of the book, and each podcast season ends when the book is finished. Besides discussing a different chapter each week, every episode also has a different theme through which the text is explored, like 'love', 'forgiveness', 'duty', or 'heartbreak'.

Most episodes follow the same format. Recurring segments include:

- Opening Story from one of the hosts (or sometimes a guest) that relates to and encompasses the theme of the episode.
- 30-second recap, in which the hosts compete to summarize this week's chapter as comprehensively as possible;
- Reading and discussing the chapter through the week's theme. For instance, in an episode about shame, the show explored ways in which the characters can be seen to act out of shame or embarrassment.
- Sacred reading: a specific sacred reading practice is applied to part of the chapter. Practices used include chavruta, pardes, florilegium, marginalia, sacred imagination and lectio divina.
- Fan voicemail: listeners of the podcast send in their own personal stories related to the book or a topic discussed in a previous episode. The topics are usually quite serious; for instance in season 3 a listener from Austin, Texas shared her thoughts on the recent University of Texas stabbing related to the theme of forgiveness.
- Blessing: the podcast closes with Zoltan and Ter Kuile each choosing to bless a character from the chapter. Since the inception of the podcast, Zoltan has endeavoured to always pledge her blessing each episode to a female character in the chapter, which has, in some instances, particularly highlighted the complete absence of female presence in some chapters of Harry Potter.

== Episodes ==
Harry Potter and the Sacred Text features several different types of episodes: regular episodes of the show discuss individual chapters of the Harry Potter books at a rate of one chapter per podcast episode; in addition, each season of the show ends with a wrap-up episode that discusses the volume as a whole and at least one Owl Post episode, wherein at least one of the hosts listens and responds to several listener voicemails. These episodes often feature a guest, who is invited to speak on a topic related to understanding and practicing spirituality. There are also eleven full-length special episodes, including a look at Fantastic Beasts and Where to Find Them, a recording of the very first Harry Potter and the Sacred Text Live Event, extended conversations with special guests to the show, looks ahead to what the team is excited about for future episodes, and others. These episodes typically run between 30 and 45 minutes. As of June 21, 2020, there are 202 full-length regular episodes of the podcast.

In addition, eight episodes of the series The Women of Harry Potter were originally released in the Harry Potter and the Sacred Text feed as special episodes, mostly throughout Season 5. These episodes, offering in depth blessings for and character discussions of the women from the Harry Potter universe, were moved into their own show feed beginning with Season 6 and then discontinued as a separate entity, instead being offered as a perk of becoming a member to the show's Patreon. Host Casper ter Kuile has also released special readings of poems for Christmas and the band Harry and the Potters recorded a song called "Don't Be a Dursley" as a part of the show's fundraiser for RAICES.

The show has released notes to its community in seven instances: during Season 2, a note post-2016 US presidential election; during Season 3, a note on white supremacy after the massacre at Charlottesville; during Season 4, an update on a contest the show was running; during Season 5, a note on the confirmation of Brett Kavanaugh to the Supreme Court of the United States; during Season 6, a note on the Don't Be A Dursley campaign to raise money to aid RAICES and a second note toward the end of the season at the beginning of the COVID-19 lockdown in the United States; and during Season 7, a note announcing a fundraiser in support of Black Lives Matter.

== Other activities ==
Zoltan and Ter Kuile also host live shows, which are 'inspired' by the podcast but include more interactive elements. Live events have included games, live music, audience participation and meditations. Harry Potter and the Sacred Text live shows have been featured at conventions like LeakyCon, PodCon and Nerdcon:Nerdfighteria.

While the original book club started by Zoltan and Ter Kuile continues to this day, local reading groups for Harry Potter and the Sacred Text have sprung up all around the US as well as in the UK, Europe, Canada and Australia.

== Reception ==
Harry Potter and the Sacred Text charted #2 on the iTunes Podcast Charts in August 2016 and has around 100,000 listeners per week. The podcast was listed in The Guardian's "50 best podcasts of 2016", taking the number two spot in the category "Culture and Sport", and featured second on Entertainment Weekly's "Must List" in September 2016

According to The Daily Dot, "the beauty of the podcast comes from the storytelling and analysis". They consider the show a fascinating way to revisit the Harry Potter books, adding that it "manages to respect and reflect on a range of faiths and religions from around the world." The Jewish Journal describes Harry Potter and the Sacred Text as "proudly idealistic, but also grounded in realism", while the Utah Statesman praises the hosts' charm: "Zoltan and ter Kuile have been accomplishing their goal of relating Harry Potter text to real-world lessons, but it is their nerdy and friendly personalities that keep me coming back for more each week."

However, some publications express reservations about co-opting religious language for secular texts. Conservative journal LifeZette posits: "Fans of the podcast are using terminology previously used by or about Christian believers to describe their trust in Jesus Christ as Savior, yet now they're talking about … a wizard." and says about Vanessa Zoltan "Clearly, she and her colleagues are 'up to something.'" Religious journal First Things gives a mixed review, criticising the lack of solid basis for its definition of 'sacred' and noting: "It seems that the hosts of this show are great on quips, but not so good on metaphysics". However, they praise the podcast's humble approach to the text and consider it part of a valuable literary culture that loves books for their 'hidden gifts': "much of HPST is simply an exercise in thoughtful reading—the kind of joyful reflection that draws avid readers and makes avid readers, that reminds us how great books comes alive when we trust them to teach us something".

== See also ==
- Religion and spirituality podcast
