= Shoplifters of the World =

American comedy film by Stephen Kijak

- Official poster
- Directed by: Stephen Kijak
- Screenplay by: Stephen Kijak
- Story by: Lorianne Hall
- Produced by: Marco Vicini; Lorianne Hall; Adam Schoon; Christopher Figg; Phill Hoelting; Laura Rister; Nick Manganiello; Joe Manganiello
- Starring: Helena Howard; Ellar Coltrane; Elena Kampouris; Nick Krause; James Bloor; Thomas Lennon; Joe Manganiello
- Cinematography: Andrew Wheeler
- Edited by: Fabienne Bouville; Yaniv Dabach
- Music by: Rael Jones
- Production companies: Piccadilly Pictures; Sun Capital; 3:59; Untitled Entertainment; Oscura Film
- Distributed by: RLJE Films
- Release date: March 26, 2021
- Running time: 90 minutes
- Country: United States
- Language: English

Shoplifters of the World is a 2021 American independent comedy-drama film written and directed by Stephen Kijak. It stars Helena Howard, Ellar Coltrane, Elena Kampouris, Nick Krause, James Bloor, Thomas Lennon and Joe Manganiello.

The film was released on March 26, 2021 by RLJE Films.

== Plot ==
In Denver, four friends reel from the sudden breakup of the Smiths, while the local radio station is held at gunpoint by a fan who forces a disgruntled heavy-metal DJ to play music by the Smiths all night.

The plot is loosely based on an actual incident that occurred in 1988 when an 18-year-old attempted to commandeer Denver Top 40 station Y108.

== Cast ==
- Helena Howard as Cleo
- Ellar Coltrane as Dean
- Elena Kampouris as Sheila
- Nick Krause as Billy
- James Bloor as Patrick
- Thomas Lennon as Uncle Shadrack
- Joe Manganiello as Mickey "Full Metal Mickey"
- Olivia Luccardi as Sandi
- Imani Lewis as Rita
- Celia Au as Siouxsie Chu
- Cameron Moulène as David
- Elliot Frances Flynn as Punk Paul
- Casey Sullivan as Jock #2
- Tonatiuh as Brian

== Production ==
In February 2012, it was announced that Jessica Brown Findlay, James Frecheville, Jeremy Allen White, Thomas Brodie-Sangster, Skylar Astin and Zosia Mamet had joined the cast of the film, with Stephen Kijak directing from a screenplay that had written. In March 2014, Joe Manganiello joined the cast, and in September 2016, it was announced that Sasha Lane, Isabelle Fuhrman, Ellar Coltrane and Nick Krause had also joined, with Findlay, Frecheville, White, Sangster, Astin and Mamet no longer attached. In February 2019, it was announced that Helena Howard, Elena Kampouris and Nick Krause had joined the cast.

Principal photography began in October 2018 in the region of Albany, New York, mostly in the towns of Troy and Colonie.

== Release ==
In September 2020, RLJE Films acquired distribution rights to the film. It was released on March 26, 2021.

== Reception ==
=== Critical reception ===
On Rotten Tomatoes, the film holds a 45% approval rating based on 44 reviews, with an average rating of 5.40/10. On Metacritic, the film holds a rating of 50 out of 100, based on seven critics, indicating "mixed or average reviews".

Jeannette Catsoulis of the New York Times wrote that the film was "a loving gift to superfans of the English band The Smiths...this sweetly nostalgic look at lost boys and lonely girls feels like it comes straight from the heart." Armond White's review in National Review stated: "This is an alternative-rock version of American Graffiti...(the) music's dramatic resonances are, moment to moment, breathtaking"; he also wrote: "If The Smiths were the greatest group of the Eighties, this film about American teens' heartfelt response, reveals the most intense longing for personal expression in the history of popular culture. Stephen Kijak creates one poignant, exultant scene after another." Ken Scrudato of BlackBook wrote: "The film is haunted by a kind of inescapable, mournful nostalgia, as it piercingly reminds of the irreversible demise of the sort of weirdo tribalism that once so intensely bound together all those living just beyond the fringes of societal acceptance – a tribalism that has been replaced by the Instagramming of pancakes and the soulless obsession with 60-second TikTok videos about absolutely nothing...these were indeed the songs that saved your life – and Shoplifters of the World rightly and properly celebrates them."

=== Reaction from Morrissey ===
The Smiths' lead singer Morrissey voiced his approval of the film, stating on his website: "I laughed, I cried, I ate my own head. The Smiths' past still sounds like today's frustrations and tomorrow's liberations."
