= Ms. White Light =

2019 film directed by Paul Shoulberg

- Promotional poster
- Directed by: Paul Shoulberg
- Written by: Paul Shoulberg
- Produced by: John Robert Armstrong; Zachary Spicer; Gordon Strain
- Starring: Roberta Colindrez; Carson Meyer; Zachary Spicer; John Ortiz; Judith Light
- Cinematography: Jim Timperman
- Edited by: Kevin Weaver
- Music by: Zachary Walter
- Production companies: Pigasus Pictures; Blueline Media Productions
- Distributed by: Freestyle Releasing
- Release date: March 11, 2019 (SXSW)
- Running time: 97 minutes
- Country: United States
- Language: English

Ms. White Light is a 2019 American dark comedy drama film written and directed by Paul Shoulberg. The film stars Roberta Colindrez and Judith Light. Filmed in Bloomington, Indiana, it premiered on March 11 at the 2019 South by Southwest film festival. It was released by Freestyle Releasing on October 6, 2020.

== Premise ==
Lex Cordova (Roberta Colindrez) is a young consultant for terminally ill clients, mets Val (Judith Light), a cancer patient who doesn't care that she is dying.

== Cast ==
- Roberta Colindrez as Lex Cordova
- Judith Light as Val
- Carson Meyer as Nora
- Zachary Spicer as Spencer
- John Ortiz as Gary
- Rachel Matthews as Nurse Landon
- Henry Woronicz as Mitch
- TayLar Fondren as Ellen

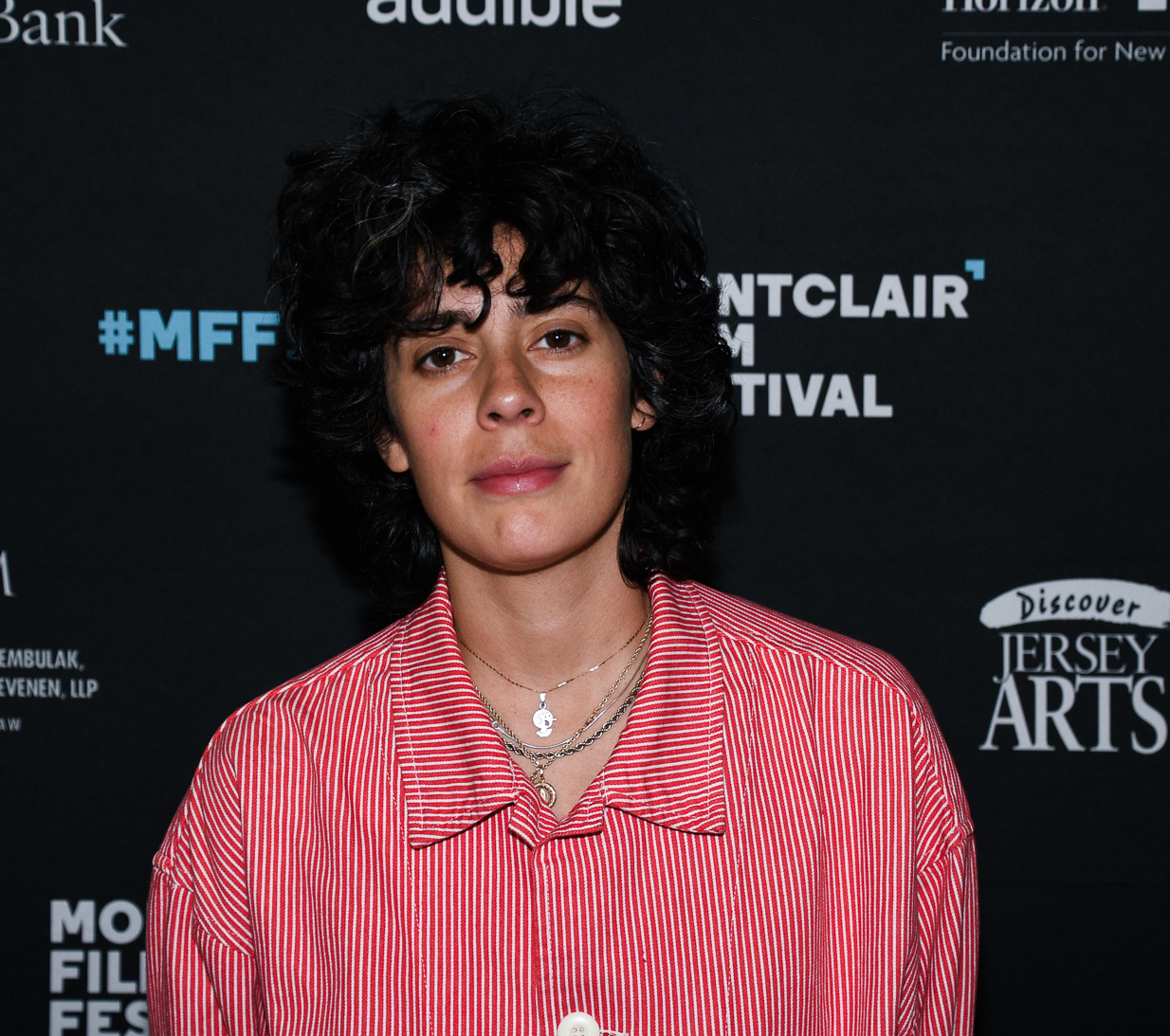
Roberta Colindrez at the Montclair Film festival

== Reception ==
The film has a 57% rating on Rotten Tomatoes based on 7 reviews.

Film critic John DeFore wrote in his The Hollywood Reporter review: "A near-miss that should find some appreciative viewers, it feels like a stage play in need of a little polishing, whose talented cast likes it enough to commit fully." Adam Vaughn from Film Festival Today gave it 3 out of 4 stars writing: "While the performances (and the push of performances via mostly long takes) contain the bulk of value in the film, Ms. White Light still misses the one piece of thematic content that could differentiate it from countless other tales of life right before death." Meanwhile, Aaron Peterson from The Hollywood Outsider gave it a positive review praising the performances and wrote in his review: " Director Paul Shoulberg’s film is a haunting tale detailing the constant struggle with our own mortality, and our reluctance to accept our eventual fate. Carried by the daring lead performance from Roberta Colindrez, Ms. White Light is an early favorite as one of the best films of 2019."
