= 2149: The Aftermath =

- Film poster
- Directed by: Benjamin Duffield
- Written by: Robert Higden
- Produced by: Susan Schneir; Kim Berlin; Jason Ross Jallet; B. P. Paquette
- Starring: Molly Parker; Nick Krause; Juliette Gosselin; Jordyn Negri; Daniel DiVenere; Cassidy Marlene Jaggard
- Narrated by: Joe Bohbot
- Cinematography: Tobie Marier Robitaille
- Edited by: Benjamin Duffield and Éric Drouin
- Music by: James Gelfland and Louise Tremblay
- Production companies: Suki Films; Nortario Films
- Distributed by: Suki Releasing
- Release date: April 15, 2016
- Running time: 92 minutes
- Country: Canada
- Language: English

2149: The Aftermath (also known as ESC, Darwin, and Confinement) is a Canadian science fiction film directed by Benjamin Duffield and written by Robert Higden. The film stars Molly Parker, Nick Krause, Juliette Gosselin, Cassidy Marlene Jaggard, Jordyn Negri, and Daniel DiVenere.

Principal photography on the film commenced June 2014 in Greater Sudbury, Ontario, Canada, and wrapped-up July 2014. Suki Films is producing the film with Nortario Films, based in Greater Sudbury. The film was financed by Telefilm Canada, the Northern Ontario Heritage Fund Corporation, the Ontario Media Development Corporation, and the Harold Greenberg Fund. It was released summer 2016.

== Plot ==
Set in an oppressive, post-apocalyptic future, resulting from a world-wide biological war, people live in small cement modules with little more than a computer which connects them to their job, food and entertainment. Some people work to control drones, which survey the outside world and capture humans. Darwin, a young boy is left in a pod by his mother, who promises to come back for him. After nine years, Darwin (portrayed by Nick Krause) is forced out into the real world when his module and alarm is left without power by a lightning strike and discovers truths about the world and his own life that he never dreamed of. He comes across a family in hiding living together in the wilderness, and becomes part of their family. He becomes friends with Dara, a young woman who teaches him how to speak. Darwin makes the difficult decision to leave in order to search for his mother. He finds his mother's pod and after a close encounter with a drone, realizes there's people watching, but nobody capturing. After kissing his mother goodbye, he returns to his life in the wilderness with Dara.

== Cast ==
- Nick Krause as Darwin
- Molly Parker as Lillian Bale
- Juliette Gosselin as Dara
- Jordyn Negri as Beth
- Daniel DiVenere as Steven
- Cassidy Marlene Jaggard as Susie

== Release ==
Suki International set the film for a winter-spring 2016 release.

Filmed in the summer of 2014, this movie has had 4 different titles. It started as "ESC," then became "Darwin," then became "Confinement," and the latest is "2149: The Aftermath"

It was released on Amazon Prime in November 2021 under the title 2149: The Aftermath.
