= Denise Williamson =

American actress

- Born: Denise Lauren Williamson; December 4,
- Education: Sam Houston State University
- Occupation: Actress
- Years active: 2009–present

Denise Williamson is an American actress best known for her work on Maggie (2015), Blacktino (2011) and The D Train (2015).

== Filmography ==
Year	Title	Role	Notes
2009	Spirit Camp	Monica	
2011	Cherry Bomb (film)	Sapphire	
2011	Mardi Gras: Spring Break	Samantha	
2012	Up&Down	Kristina the Cocktail Waitress	
2012	Pitch Perfect		photo double/stand in – uncredited
2013	White Rabbit (film)	Alice	
2014	Exists	Elizabeth	
2014	The D Train	Alyssa	
2015	Dark Places	Crystal	
2015	Maggie	Barbara	
2015	Hot Air	Ginger	
