= White Rabbit (2013 film) =

2013 film by Tim McCann

- Theatrical release poster
- Directed by: Tim McCann
- Written by: Anthony Di Pietro
- Produced by: Shaun Sanghani; Robert Yocum; Jacky Lee Morgan
- Starring: Nick Krause; Sam Trammell; Britt Robertson; Ryan Lee; Dodie Brown
- Cinematography: Alan McIntyre Smith
- Edited by: Tim McCann
- Music by: John Vincent McCauley
- Production companies: Burning Sky Films; SSS Entertainment
- Distributed by: Breaking Glass Pictures
- Release dates: September 30, 2013 (Zurich Film Festival); February 13, 2015 (United States)
- Running time: 90 minutes
- Country: United States
- Language: English
- Budget: $858,845

White Rabbit is a 2013 American psychological drama film directed by Tim McCann and starring Nick Krause, Sam Trammell and Britt Robertson. Written by Anthony Di Pietro, the film concerns a mentally-ill teen being bullied in high school, whose visions urge him to take revenge. It was produced by Robert Yocum (Burning Sky Films), Shaun Sanghani (SSS Entertainment) and Jacky Lee Morgan. It had its world premiere at the Zurich Film Festival and is being distributed in the United States by Breaking Glass Pictures.

== Plot ==
Harlon Mackey has been tormented by visions since his alcoholic father forced him to kill a rabbit while hunting as a boy. Now that Harlon is a bullied high school teen, his undiagnosed mental illness is getting worse. He begins to hear voices, and his imagination encourages him to carry out violent acts. Things begin to look up when Julie, a rebellious young girl, moves to town and befriends Harlon. But when she betrays him, the line between reality and Harlon's imagination begins to blur, and the rabbit along with other imaginary comic book characters taunt him into committing one final act of revenge.

== Cast ==
- Nick Krause as Harlon Mackey
- Sam Trammell as Darrell Mackey
- Britt Robertson as Julie
- Ryan Lee as Steve
- Josh Warren as Duane
- Denise Williamson as Alice
- Lawrence Turner as Harvey
- Billy Slaughter as Dr. Clayton

== Production ==
Principal photography began in August 2012 in Louisiana, United States for 21 days.

=== Music ===
White Rabbit: Original Motion Picture Score (composed by John Vincent McCauley) was released digitally on January 20, 2015.

== Release ==
White Rabbit premiered on September 30, 2013, at the Zurich Film Festival. It was released theatrically and on video on demand in North America on February 13, 2015.

== Reception ==
On the review aggregator website Rotten Tomatoes, 21% of 14 critics' reviews are positive. Metacritic, which uses a weighted average, assigned the film a score of 41 out of 100, based on 7 critics, indicating "mixed or average" reviews.

== Accolades ==
Awards
Award	Date of ceremony	Category	Recipients and nominees	Result
Catalina Film Festival	September 28, 2014	Best Film	Shaun Sanghani (SSS Entertainment)	Won
Boston Film Festival	September 30, 2014	Best Actor	Nick Krause	Won
Boston Film Festival	September 30, 2014	Best Supporting Actor	Sam Trammell	Won
Boston Film Festival	September 30, 2014	Best Supporting Actress	Britt Robertson	Won
Chelsea Film Festival	October 19, 2014	Best Supporting Actor	Sam Trammell	Won
Chelsea Film Festival	October 19, 2014	Best Cinematography	Alan McIntyre Smith	Won
