= Nick Krause =

American film and television actor

- Born: Austin, Texas
- Occupations: Actor, director, producer, writer
- Years active: 2004–present
- Known for: The Descendants (2011)

Nick Krause is an American film and television actor. In 2014 Krause won Best Actor for his portrayal of Harlon in the film White Rabbit at the Boston and Catalina Film Festivals. Other roles include the film The Descendants (2011).

== Early life and education ==
Krause was born in Austin, Texas, the son of talent agent Liz Atherton, and was raised in Georgetown. His sister is the actress Kate Krause. He attended NYOS Charter School and graduated early from Georgetown High School to begin the filming of The Descendants in Hawaii. He also attended a mathematics college course at the age of ten. Krause is of part-Mexican descent.

== Acting career ==
Krause's interest in acting began at the age of ten, when he attended an improvisation comedy workshop.

In 2014 Krause won Best Actor in the film White Rabbit for his portrayal of Harlon at the Catalina Film Festival. His other works include How to Eat Fried Worms (2006) as Nigel, in Homo Erectus (2007) as young Thudnik, in The Descendants (2011) as Sid and in the TV series Hollywood Heights (2012) as Adam. He also played Berto, Drew's college roommate, on the TV series Parenthood (2010). Krause also had a small role in the 2014 film Boyhood.

Krause starred in the music video for the single, "Weekend" by the band Priory, alongside Bailey Noble. In the clip, actors Nick Krause and Bailey Noble are teenagers who spend their mundane days toiling away at a roller rink. Nick daydreams of winning Bailey's affection by pulling some pretty slick skate moves on the floor, but in reality, as always, doesn't quite measure up.

== Filmography ==
=== Film ===
Year	Title	Role	Notes
2006	The Garage	Young Boy No. 1	
2006	How to Eat Fried Worms	Nigel	
2007	Dawn of Sex	Young Thudnik	
2008	Enough	Unknown	Video Short
2009	ExTerminators	Bo Turner	
2011	The Descendants	Sid	
2013	White Rabbit	Harlon Mackey	
2014	Boyhood	Charlie	
2016	2149: The Aftermath	Darwin	
2017	Windsor	Lawton	
2017	Class Rank	Bagger	
2021	Shoplifters of the World	Billy	

=== Television ===
Year	Title	Role	Notes
2004	Jack & Bobby	Bully in Rich's Posse (Uncredited)	1 Episode: #1.1
2007	As the Bell Rings	Hallway Jock	Short 1 Episode: #1.1
2012	Hollywood Uncensored with Sam Rubin	Himself-Panelist	1 Episode: #1.197
2012	GCB	Landry Cockburn	1 Episode: #1.1
2012	Sketchy	Eater	1 Episode: #1.2
2012	Hollywood Heights	Adam	Recurring: 15 Episodes
2013	Key & Peele	Monday	1 Episode: #3.7
2013–14	Parenthood	Berto	Recurring: 6 Episodes
2014	Married	Frat Treasurer	1 Episode: #1.4
2015	Grimm	Jonah Riken	Guest: 2 Episodes
2015	Fashion News Live	Himself	1 Episode: #21.26
2017	Hopped	N/A	Television Movie Co-Producer
