= Unidentified Objects =

2023 independent film

Unidentified Objects is a 2023 black comedy science-fiction road movie directed by Juan Felipe Zuleta in his feature film debut and starring Matthew August Jeffers, Sarah Hay, and Roberta Colindrez.

It had its world premiere at Inside Out, and received a limited release on June 2, 2023, prior to video on demand on June 9, 2023.

== Cast ==
- Matthew August Jeffers as Peter Hobbes
- Sarah Hay as Winona Jordan
- Roberta Colindrez as Lola Nelson
- Hamish Allan-Headley as The Handsome Stranger
- Tara Pacheco as Sadie
- Kerry Flanagan as Suzie
- Roy Abramsohn as Cliff
- Elliot Frances Flynn as Abigail
- John Ryan Benavides as Nico

== Reception ==
=== Critical Response ===
On the review aggregator website Rotten Tomatoes, the film has an approval rating of 86% based on 21 reviews.

San Francisco Magazine wrote that Unidentified Objects is "an unexpectedly funny, devastatingly authentic, philosophically stimulating experience wholly unique in the contemporary cinematic terrain" and "sure to become an indie cult classic."

“Every now and then," writes Afterbuzz, "a film is released that captivates an audience from beginning to end, and Unidentified Objects is that film.” Afterbuzz also describes Unidentified Objects as a "masterpiece." Screen Rant called the film "thoughtful, jarring, and intimate," with "lovely performances by Matthew Jeffers and Sarah Hay."

In a more mixed review for the Observer, Rex Reed described it as an "oddball curio" and added "This one is certainly different. That doesn’t mean it’s good. It’s just different."

=== Accolades ===
Unidentified Objects received the Audience Award for Best Narrative Feature and the Grand Jury Prize for Outstanding Performance in a North American Narrative Feature for Matthew August Jeffers at Outfest 2022.

=== Release ===
Unidentified Objects screened at Sitges, Fantastic Fest, BFI Flair, Bentonville Film Festival, and Outfest, where it won Best Narrative Feature and Outstanding Performance for Matthew August Jeffers.

It was acquired and released in North America by Quiver Distribution in June 2023.
