= Elliot Frances Flynn =

American actress

Elliot Frances Flynn is an American actress, writer, and social media personality. She has appeared in Shoplifters of the World, Things Heard & Seen, Linoleum, and the second season of Peacemaker.

== Early life and education ==
Flynn was born in New York City and grew up in Rockland County, New York. She is an identical triplet. She is of Italian, Irish, and Russian descent.

She attended Tappan Zee High School and studied theater at State University of New York at New Paltz.

== Career ==
=== Acting ===
Flynn made her television debut on The Naked Brothers Band in 2009 while in high school. Her feature film debut was in the 2020 film Shoplifters of the World.

Flynn's other film credits include Linoleum, which played in the dramatic competition at the South by Southwest film festival in 2022; Unidentified Objects, which The Wrap cited as one of the Best LGBTQ+ films of the year in 2022; and Confession, a crime thriller from Yale Productions starring Michael Ironside. In Confession, Flynn plays a sexual assault survivor silenced by the statute of limitations. Her performance was heralded as a "nice turn", and Flynn an actress "whose remarkable gaze can command attention even in a still photograph."

Flynn's plays a recurring character named Zora in Peacemaker season 2, James Gunn's second addition to the new DCU. She recurs as a character named Zora, who first appears in Season 2 Episode 1, The Ties that Grind.

On November 10th, 2026 it was announced she would star in the feature film Not Herself, a supernatural horror film, as Izmarie, "a guilt-ridden young woman haunted by a tragic accident in her past."

=== Other Works ===
Flynn wrote and directed a short film called "Baby Fat". The dark comedy film premiered at Indie Street Film Festival in 2025. She is also a published author of memoir, humor, and creative nonfiction in magazines like Hobart, The Offing, Maudlin House and Bullshit Lit. She has published works under the name 'E.F. Flynn.'

=== Social Media ===
Flynn has gone viral on her Instagram profile for snarky posts about movies, dating, romantic relationships, and cultural commentary. Her posts have been described as shit-posting. They are often selfies of Flynn, wearing red lipstick, with white text over the image. Her first post in this style read, "if you are looking for a boyfriend you can find one at a screening of Marty Supreme." The post amassed over forty thousand likes and was shared over nine thousand times.

== Filmography ==
=== Film ===
- As Punk Paul in Shoplifters of the World (2020)
- As Mrs. Smit (uncredited) in Things Heard & Seen (2021)
- As Abigail in Unidentified Objects (2022)
- As Francoise in Linoleum (2022)
- As Whitney Higgs in Confession (2022)
- As Grace Nichols in "The Babysitter Murders: Timing's Off" (2024)

=== Television ===
- The Naked Brothers Band (2009)
- Mare of Easttown (2021)
- Long Bright River (2025)
- Only Murders in the Building (2024)
- As Zora in Peacemaker (2025)
