= Joey Soloway =

American television creator (born 1965)

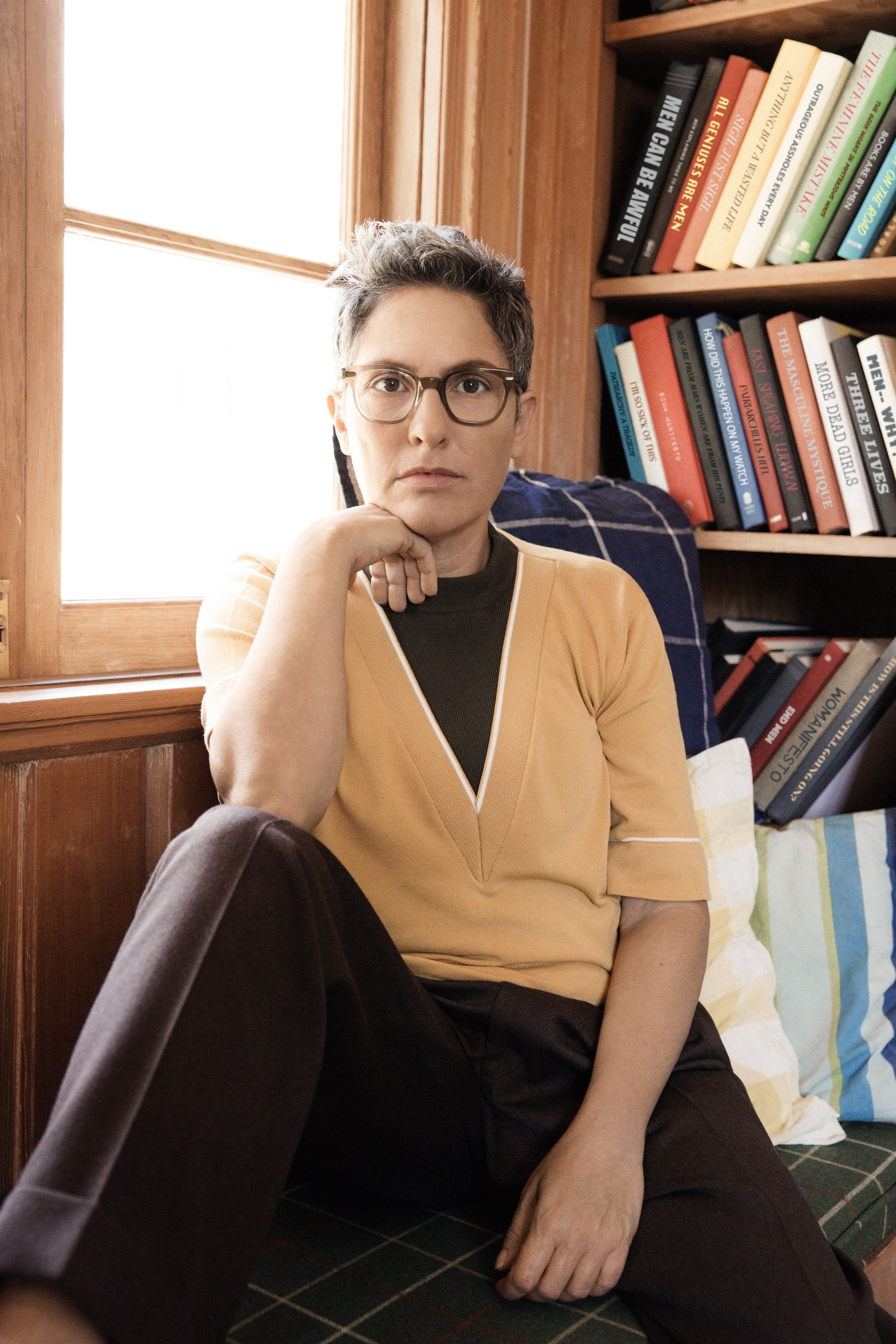
- Soloway in May 2018
- Born: Jill Soloway; September 26, 1965 (age 61); Chicago, Illinois, U.S.
- Education: University of Wisconsin, Madison (BA)
- Occupations: Writer; director; producer; comedian
- Years active: 2000–present
- Spouse: Bruce Gilbert (m. 2011; sep. 2015)
- Children: 2
- Relatives: Faith Soloway (sibling)

Joey Soloway (born Jill Soloway; September 26, 1965) is an American television creator, showrunner, director and writer. Soloway is known for creating, writing, executive producing and directing the Amazon original series Transparent, winning two Emmy Awards for the show; directing and writing the film Afternoon Delight, winning the Best Director award at the 2013 Sundance Film Festival; and producing Six Feet Under.

Soloway identifies as non-binary and gender non-conforming, and uses they/them pronouns. In 2020, Soloway announced a name change from Jill to Joey.

== Early life ==
Soloway was born in Chicago, Illinois to writer and public relations consultant Elaine Soloway and psychiatrist Carrie Soloway, who grew up in London. Around 2011, Carrie Soloway came out as transgender.

Soloway's elder sibling Faith Soloway is a Boston-based musician and performer, with whom Joey sometimes collaborates. Both Joey and Faith attended Lane Technical College Prep High School in Chicago. Joey Soloway graduated from the University of Wisconsin–Madison as a communications arts major.

Soloway's mother was formerly a press aide to Chicago Mayor Jane Byrne and was a former communications director for School Superintendent Ruth Love. After 30 years, Soloway's parents divorced in 1990. Soloway has a stepfather named Tommy Madison.

== Career ==
While at the University of Wisconsin-Madison, Soloway was a film and television student of JJ Murphy and participated in the creation of an undergraduate experimental narrative film entitled Ring of Fire as the assistant director under director Anita Katzman. After college Soloway worked as a production assistant in commercials and music videos in Chicago, as well as at Kartemquin Films on the movie Hoop Dreams.

While in Chicago, Joey and Faith co-developed a parody of The Brady Bunch for live stage called The Real Live Brady Bunch, which began their professional theatrical writing and directing endeavors. They also sold a pilot script to HBO called Jewess Jones about a female superhero. Also at the Annoyance Theatre in Chicago, the pair created plays The Miss Vagina Pageant, and later, while in Los Angeles, Not Without My Nipples.

With Maggie Rowe, Soloway co-created Hollywood Hellhouse and Sit n' Spin.

=== Television ===
Soloway's TV writing career began on shows such as The Oblongs, Nikki, and The Steve Harvey Show. Soloway followed those shows by writing for four seasons on the HBO original series Six Feet Under, ultimately serving as co-executive producer. Six Feet Under ran for five seasons from 2001 to 2005. Soloway received three Emmy nominations in 2002, 2003, and 2005 for Outstanding Drama Series. Soloway's short story, Courteney Cox's Asshole, caught the attention of Alan Ball and led to the job.

Soloway later wrote episodes of Dirty Sexy Money, Grey's Anatomy, and Tell Me You Love Me and was executive producer/showrunner for the second season of Showtime's United States of Tara, created by Diablo Cody, as well as HBO's How to Make It in America, created by Ian Edelman.

In August 2016, Amazon premiered a Soloway-directed pilot of I Love Dick, based on the novel by the same name by Chris Kraus. It was later picked up for a full season, which premiered on May 12, 2017.

==== Transparent ====
Soloway created the pilot Transparent for Amazon.com, which became available for streaming and download on February 6, 2014, and was part of Amazon's second pilot season. Joey and Faith Soloway collaborated on Transparent, including serving as co-writers. Joey was inspired by their parent who came out as a transgender woman. The show stars Gaby Hoffmann, Jay Duplass, and Amy Landecker as siblings whose parent (played by Jeffrey Tambor) reveals she is going through a significant life transition. The pilot for Transparent was picked up by Amazon Studios.

As part of the making of the show, Soloway enacted a "transfirmative action program", whereby transgender applicants were hired in preference to non-transgender ones. As of August 2014, over 80 transgender people have worked on the show, including two transgender consultants.

Soloway wrote Hoffmann's role on Transparent especially for her after seeing her performance on Louie. Transparent premiered all ten episodes simultaneously in late September 2014. The show wrapped its fourth season in 2017, and concluded with a movie finale in 2019.

Soloway received two Primetime Emmys for Outstanding Directing in a Comedy Series in 2014 and 2016 for Transparent and the show has received Emmy nominations for Outstanding Comedy Series.

=== Film ===
Soloway's first film was a 13-minute short titled Una Hora Por Favora, which premiered at the Sundance Film Festival in 2012. The film stars Michaela Watkins and Wilmer Valderrama. The film tells the story of a woman (Watkins) who hires a day laborer (Valderrama) to do some work at her home, but their relationship soon goes beyond the professional.

Soloway's debut at Sundance, Afternoon Delight (2013) won the Directing Award. The film follows Rachel (Kathryn Hahn), a thirty-something woman who is struggling to rekindle her relationship with her husband (Josh Radnor), and ultimately befriends an exotic dancer (Juno Temple). In an interview by IndieWire, Soloway had a personal connection to the film's central character, explaining "There's a lot of me in Rachel's journey. I've never brought a stripper home, but I've always loved reading the memoirs of strippers and sex workers. I feel like they're the war reporters for women. They go to the front lines of a very particular kind of extreme conflict and live there, then write about it so we can experience it with them."

Afternoon Delight played at national and international film festivals and was nominated for multiple awards, including a Gotham Award for Breakthrough Performance for Hahn and a Spirit Award for First Feature.

In June 2019, Soloway signed on to write, direct and produce the Red Sonja remake. Soloway later left the project but remained an executive producer.

=== Writing ===
Soloway wrote the novella Jodi K., which was published in the collection Three Kinds of Asking For It: Erotic Novellas, edited by Susie Bright. Soloway's memoir, Tiny Ladies in Shiny Pants: Based on a True Story, was released in hardcover in 2005, and in paperback in 2006. In 2018, Soloway published another book, She Wants It: Desire, Power and Toppling the Patriarchy, with Ebury Press, a division of Penguin Random House.

Jewish religion and culture, sexuality, and gender are recurring themes in Soloway's show, Transparent. According to Soloway, "The Transparent narrative is not, then, just or even mostly about transition and transgender. It's about big themes like familial secrets and transformation, revelation and change, all of which are rendered through the specificity and magic of television images and sounds, which create imaginative worlds."

In September 2016, Soloway gave a master class on the female gaze at the Toronto International Film Festival. The term male gaze was first coined by Laura Mulvey in her 1975 essay Visual Pleasure and Narrative Cinema and, just like Mulvey, Soloway gives their own definition of the Female Gaze in three parts. Part one: "reclaiming the body, using it with intention to communicate Feeling Seeing". An example of this female gaze is in the television show I Love Dick, Soloway said in an interview at the Sundance Film Festival that, "I Love Dick...is a series that confronts us with the power of that feminist anger, the female gaze..." Then, part two: the gazed gaze which Soloway describes as taking the camera and using it to show how it feels to be the object of the gaze. For example, in the film Fish Tank, Soloway says it does exactly that, "...while I was watching it, I was like this is the female gaze. She is showing us how it feels to be this girl. She is not looking at this girl" they explained. And part three: a "Socio-Political justice-demanding way of art making" and returning the gaze. The female gaze is about people reclaiming ownership over their body, deciding how it can be portrayed and, as Soloway points out, is a "conscious effort to create empathy as a political tool" thus seeking out empathy rather than objectification.

Soloway's writing is often about "The Heroine's Journey", which is about "repairing the divided feminine: the wife and the other woman confronting each other--mom, stripper. That I think women's journeys are really about repairing these sort of divided parts of ourselves. And this divide in our culture that I think is responsible for so much that is a problem in our culture."

== Honors ==
Soloway has seven Emmy nominations and two wins. Soloway is also a member of the board of the San Francisco Film Society.

In 2015, Soloway's show Transparent won a Golden Globe for Best Series - Musical or Comedy, which Soloway dedicated to Leelah Alcorn after her suicide the year prior. Later that same year, Soloway won a DGA Award and a Primetime Emmy Award for directing episode 1.08 ("Best New Girl") of the show. In 2016, Soloway won another Emmy for directing episode 2.09 (" Man on the Land") of Transparent. Also in 2016, Soloway was a finalist for The Advocate's Person of the Year, and was named to Oprah Winfrey's SuperSoul 100 list of visionaries and influential leaders.

Soloway was inducted into the Chicago LGBT Hall of Fame in 2022.

== Personal life ==
In 2011, Soloway married music supervisor Bruce Gilbert, with whom Soloway had been in a relationship since 2008. They have a son. Soloway's older son is from a prior relationship with artist John Strozier. In 2015, Soloway announced their separation from Gilbert, and that Soloway was in a relationship with poet Eileen Myles, whom Soloway met through Transparent; their romantic relationship has since ended, and Myles and Soloway held an event at the Hammer Museum, Los Angeles, in which they "processed [their] relationship onstage".

Soloway lives in the Silver Lake neighborhood of Los Angeles.

In Soloway's memoir She Wants It, Soloway discusses accepting a nonbinary identity at age 50 after filming the first two seasons of Transparent.

=== Activism ===
Soloway is a strong supporter of feminism and co-founded the website Wifey.tv which is described as, "a curated video network for women" that includes content created by and for women. In an interview by Forbes, Soloway discusses the site saying, "I really like when our content appears to contradict itself at first glance. One day we might post something about sexism or the male gaze, then the next day post something that might be seen as precisely too sexy or raunchy, but it comes from a female creator or artist so it’s relevant. We love the conversation and don’t feel as dependent on insisting on a particular point of view."

Soloway also co-founded the East Side Jews collective, which is funded by the Jewish Federation of Greater Los Angeles. The collective "brings together 20- and 30-something Jews in Silver Lake and the surrounding neighborhoods of Los Angeles for offbeat, too-cool-for-shul events that tend to be heavy on comedy and light on Jewish ritual."

Soloway co-wrote The Thanksgiving Paris Manifesto with Eileen Myles in 2016, which is a feminist manifesto about the pornography industry. The manifesto was posted on topplethepatriarchy.com, a domain purchased by Myles and Soloway. The manifesto opens with, "We shouldn’t be starting with porn but we must. We support the idea of a porn industry and the idea of people making a living photographing and sharing images of sex but we don’t support an industry that exclusively distributes portrayals of almost exclusively male pleasure and climax."

== Works or publications ==
- Bright, Susie, Eric Albert, Greta Christina, and Jill Soloway. "Jodi K." (novella) Susie Bright Presents: Three Kinds of Asking for It: Erotic Novellas, New York: Simon & Schuster, 2005; ISBN 978-0-743-24550-0
- Soloway, Jill. Tiny Ladies in Shiny Pants: Based on a True Story, New York: Free Press, 2005; ISBN 978-0-743-27217-9
- Soloway, Jill. She Wants It: Desire, Power, and Toppling the Patriarchy, Crown Archetype, 2018; ISBN 9781101904749
