= Hickory Hideout =

US television program

Hickory Hideout was a television program for children which was filmed in Cleveland, Ohio on WKYC-TV and aired nationally on NBC O&Os from 1981 to 1991.

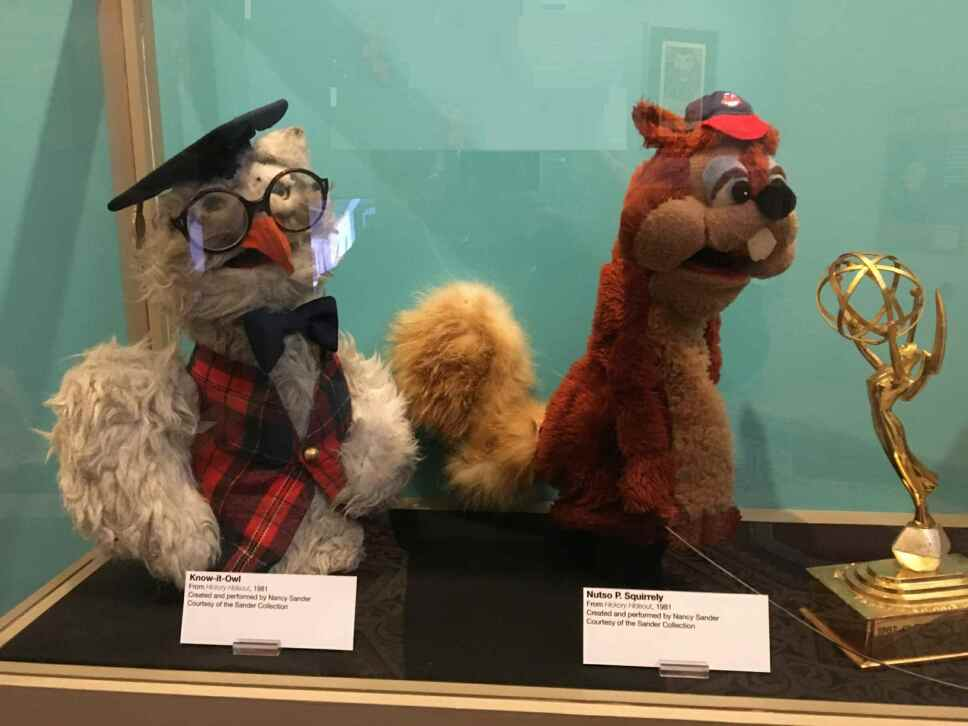
Know-it-Owl and Nutso P. Squirrely

The show was hosted by Cassie Wolfe and Wayne Turney and featured puppet squirrel characters ("Nutso" played by Nancy Sander and "Shirley" played by Linda A. Wells), and other characters, including Buzz Buzzsaw and Cecelia C. Seesaw.

Despite its lighthearted setting, it addressed psychological issues that children face and was a change from the usual lineup of Saturday-morning cartoons.

Wayne S. Turney won an Emmy Award for his work on Hickory Hideout.

Kathryn Hahn, a Cleveland native, had her first TV appearance on the show. The show also featured a young Matthew James Murphy, who went on to perform in the Broadway musical Rent.

At the time of the program's production, WKYC-TV was an NBC owned-and-operated station. From 1986 until the program's conclusion in 1991 Hickory Hideout was also broadcast on other NBC-owned stations, including WNBC-TV in New York City; WRC-TV in Washington, D.C.; WMAQ-TV in Chicago; KCNC-TV in Denver; and KNBC in Los Angeles.
