= Roberta Colindrez =

Mexican-American actor and writer

- Roberta Colindrez attending the "Being Heumann" Premiere at TIFF 2026
- Born: May 28, 1986 (age 40); Monterrey, Nuevo León, Mexico
- Occupations: Actor; playwright
- Years active: 2006–present
- Known for: Fun Home; I Love Dick; Vida; A League of Their Own

Roberta Colindrez (born May 28, 1986) is a Mexican-American actor and writer. She is best known for originating the role of Joan in the musical Fun Home. Additionally, Colindrez is known for roles in the TV shows I Love Dick, Vida, and A League of Their Own, as well as the films Ms. White Light (2019) and Cassandro (2023).

== Early life ==
Colindrez was born on May 28, 1986 in Monterrey, Nuevo León, Mexico. She has Argentinian and Honduran heritage. Colindrez migrated from Mexico to Houston when she was 5 years old. She lived in Houston for six years then moved to Austin, Texas when she was 10 years old. She first realized she wanted to become an actor at age 12, when she and her brother took a theater class together. She went to Westwood High School, and went on to the Texas State University where she graduated with bachelor's degree in acting. She later moved to New York City. While trying to find work as an actor, she also worked in restaurants and as a church janitor. Colindrez eventually joined the New York Neo-Futurists.

== Career ==
Colindrez made her off-off-Broadway debut in 2006, in the Neo-Futurist revue Too Much Light Makes the Baby Go Blind. She appeared in several short films and regional theater productions after that, and in 2011 she wrote and starred in the film Otis Under Sky. In 2013, she began playing Joan in the musical Fun Home off-Broadway. The show closed in early 2014, then opened on Broadway in 2015, where it won five Tony Awards and was nominated for seven more.

Colindrez has made guest appearances on several television series. Her performance on I Love Dick was described as a "breakout" in an interview with Vanity Fair.

In 2018, Colindrez joined the cast of HBO's The Deuce as Irene. In 2019, Colindrez joined Vida as Nico.

She also does voice acting work, most notably on the podcast Alice Isn't Dead, and writes for the stage.

In 2020, Colindrez joined the cast of Amazon's A League of Their Own, about the All American Girls Professional Baseball League, as the character Lupe.

Colindrez also originated the role of the Farmer in a 2022 workshop of the first act of Césaire José Carroll-Domínguez's epic historical play Spreckles which premiered in the 2022 Beyond The Box performance festival in Marfa, Texas with the Marfa Live Arts group in the Crowley Theater.

== Personal life ==
Colindrez identifies as queer and butch.

Colindrez became close friends with Bobbi Salvör Menuez on the set of I Love Dick. Menuez gave Colindrez a stick and poke tattoo as a memento of their friendship.

== Credits ==
=== Film ===
Year	Title	Role	Notes
2008	One Dollar Poem		Short
2011	Otis Under Sky	Ursula	Also writer
2013	Beautiful Dreamer	Catherina	Short
2013	The Artist's Assistant	Justine	Short
2014	Birdman or (The Unexpected Virtue of Ignorance)	Broadway Woman on Street	
2019	Ms. White Light	Lex Cordova	
2019	Friends Like That	Alex	Short
2022	Unidentified Objects	Lola Nelson	
2023	Cassandro	Sabrina	
2026	Never Change!	Claire Dubois	
2026	Being Heumann	Joni Breves	
TBA	Exit Right		Filming

=== Television ===
Year	Title	Role	Notes
2012–2014	Girls	Tako	2 episodes
2014	F to 7th	Baby	Episode: "Down to Zero"
2014	Gotham	Female Detective	Episode: "Pilot"
2014	Unforgettable	Pam Lisotta	Episode: "Throwing Shade"
2014	Boardwalk Empire		Episode: "Golden Days for Boys and Girls"
2015	Late Night with Seth Meyers	Self/Joan	Episode: "Ed Helms/Alison Bechdel/Fun Home/Brad Wilk"
2016–2017	I Love Dick	Devon	8 episodes
2018	The Good Fight	FBI Agent Grace	Episode: "Day 492"
2018	Home	Roberta Colindrez	Episode: "Home on the Range"
2018–2019	The Deuce	Irene	12 episodes
2019	Mr. Robot	Happyhardonhenry806	Episode: "404 Not Found"
2019–2020	Vida	Nico Silva	14 episodes
2020	Interrogation	Detective Boyd	Episode: "Det. Dave Russell vs Chris Keller 1983"
2020	Mrs. America	Jules	Episode: "Phyllis & Fred & Brenda & Marc"
2020	Monsterland	Shawn Greene	Episode: "Plainfield, Illinois"
2021	The Harper House	Tonya Acosta (voice)	5 episodes
2021	High Herstory	The Storyteller/Ellen Ochoa	2 episodes
2022	A League of Their Own	Lupe Garcia	8 episodes
2024	Eric	Ronnie	Miniseries

=== Theater ===
- Water, NPR Playhouse
- The Complete and Condensed Stage Directions of Eugene O'Neill: Vol. 2
- Too Much Light Makes the Baby Go Blind, off-Broadway, 2006
- Song for the Disappeared, Sundance Theater Lab
- Fun Home, Joan, off-Broadway, Sep. 30, 2013 – Jan. 12, 2014
- Mala Hierba, Maritza, Second Stage Theater, 2014
- Fun Home, Joan, Broadway, Apr. 19, 2015 – September, 2016
- Hamlet, Rosencrantz, off-Broadway, 2017
- Spreckles, Marfa Live Arts, 2022
- Cult of Love, Second Stage Theater, Pippa Ferguson, Broadway, December 12th, 2025 - February 2nd, 2025

=== Podcasts ===
- Alice Isn't Dead, 6 episodes, 2016–2017
- It Makes a Sound, Pam Orland, 1 episode, 2018

== See also ==
- List of LGBT people from New York City
