= The D Train =

- Theatrical release poster
- Directed by: Jarrad Paul; Andrew Mogel
- Written by: Jarrad Paul; Andrew Mogel
- Produced by: David Bernad; Mike White; Jack Black; Priyanka Mattoo; Ben Latham-Jones; Barnaby Thompson
- Starring: Jack Black; James Marsden; Kathryn Hahn; Mike White; Jeffrey Tambor
- Cinematography: Giles Nuttgens
- Edited by: Terel Gibson
- Music by: Andrew Dost
- Production companies: Stage 6 Films; Ealing Studios; Electric Dynamite; Rip Cord Productions; Londinium Films
- Distributed by: IFC Films (United States); Sony Pictures Releasing (international)
- Release dates: January 23, 2015 (Sundance); May 8, 2015 (United States); September 18, 2015 (United Kingdom)
- Running time: 101 minutes
- Countries: United States; United Kingdom
- Language: English
- Budget: $3.4 million
- Box office: $774,780

The D Train (also known as Bad Bromance) is a 2015 black comedy film written and directed by Jarrad Paul and Andrew Mogel in their directorial debuts, and stars Jack Black and James Marsden. The film premiered at the 37th Sundance Film Festival on January 23, 2015, and was released in the United States on May 8, 2015, by IFC Films.

== Premise ==
Dan Landsman is the self-proclaimed chairman of his Pittsburgh high school's alumni committee. While planning the twenty-year reunion, Dan has the idea of convincing Oliver Lawless, the most popular guy in his graduating class (and now a TV-commercial celebrity) to return, thinking that this will make people want to attend.

== Cast ==
- Jack Black as Daniel Gregory Landsman (aka The D Train)
- James Marsden as Oliver Lawless
- Kathryn Hahn as Stacey Landsman
- Jeffrey Tambor as Bill Shurmur
- Russell Posner as Zach Landsman
- Kyle Bornheimer as Randy
- Mike White as Jerry
- Henry Zebrowski as Craig
- Denise Williamson as Alyssa
- Donna Duplantier as Taj
- Han Soto as Dale
- Dermot Mulroney as himself

== Production ==
On February 10, 2014, it was announced that Jack Black and James Marsden would star in a comedy film, directing debut of Jarrad Paul and Andrew Mogel, which Black's Electric Dynamite produced with Mike White's RipCord Productions and Ben Latham-Jones and Barnaby Thompson of Ealing Studios.

=== Filming ===
According to a casting call, the shooting was set to begin on March 17, 2014, in Metairie, Louisiana. Later on March 19, Jack Black was spotted during the filming of The D Train in New Orleans. Due to Black's schedule, the film was shot in just 21 days.

=== Music ===
In October 2014, Andrew Dost was hired to compose the music for the film. OMD frontman Andy McCluskey provides lead vocals on the track "A Million Stars".

A Pittsburgh sports radio segment playing when Dan arrives at a sports bar includes an audio cameo by John-Paul "JP" Flaim, Eric "EB" Bickel, Johnny "Cakes" Auville and Jason "Lurch" Bishop, the titular hosts of The Sports Junkies in Washington. The Junkies also released audio of them reading their lines in studio.

== Release ==
The D Train premiered at the 2015 Sundance Film Festival on January 23, 2015. Shortly after, IFC Films acquired U.S. distribution rights for $3 million in a bidding war against studios including Lionsgate, Fox Searchlight, Broad Green Pictures and Alchemy. The film was released theatrically in the United States on May 8, 2015, by IFC Films.

=== Box office ===
In its opening weekend, the film grossed $447,524 from 1,009 theaters ($444 per theater), which is the 15th worst opening for a wide release film of all time. In its second weekend, the film was pulled from 847 screens, and its weekend-to-weekend gross fell 96.5%, as it only earned $15,714 ($97 per theater). As of November 10, 2015, the film had grossed $771,317.

=== Critical response ===
On Rotten Tomatoes the film has a rating of 55% based on 132 reviews, with an average rating of 5.70/10. The site's consensus reads, "The D Train offers Jack Black a too-rare opportunity to showcase his range, but its story and characters are too sloppily conceived to hold together as a film." On Metacritic the film has a weighted average score of 55 out of 100, based on 33 critics, indicating "mixed or average reviews".

The New York Post described the film as "cute, breezy fun".
