= Cassandro (film) =

2023 film by Roger Ross Williams

- Release poster
- Directed by: Roger Ross Williams
- Written by: Roger Ross Williams; David Teague
- Produced by: Gerardo Gatica; Todd Black; David Bloomfield; Ted Hope; Julie Goldman
- Starring: Gael García Bernal; Roberta Colindrez; Perla De La Rosa; Joaquín Cosío; Raúl Castillo; El Hijo del Santo; Bad Bunny
- Cinematography: Matias Penachino
- Edited by: Yibran Asuad; Affonso Gonçalves; Sabine Hoffman
- Music by: Marcelo Zarvos
- Production companies: Escape Artists; Panorama Global
- Distributed by: Amazon MGM Studios
- Release dates: January 20, 2023 (Sundance); September 15, 2023 (United States)
- Running time: 107 minutes
- Country: United States
- Languages: English; Spanish

Cassandro is a 2023 American biographical drama film directed by Roger Ross Williams from a screenplay co-written by Williams and David Teague. It stars Gael García Bernal, Roberta Colindrez, Perla De La Rosa, Joaquín Cosío, Raúl Castillo, El Hijo del Santo and Bad Bunny. It had its world premiere at the 2023 Sundance Film Festival on January 20, 2023, and was released by Amazon MGM Studios in a limited release on September 15, 2023, prior to streaming via Prime Video on September 22, 2023.

== Plot ==
In the late 1980s, gay wrestler Saúl Armendáriz lives in El Paso, Texas with his mother, regularly crossing the border to Ciudad Juárez to participate in professional wrestling matches. He begins wrestling as 'El Topo' until he meets a new trainer, Sabrina, who inspires him to compete as an exótico and trains him to be a winner within this role. He develops the identity of 'Cassandro' and begins to confront elements of his identity and explore his personal relationships whilst gaining a reputation for himself within lucha libre.

== Cast ==
- Gael García Bernal as Saúl Armendáriz / Cassandro
- Roberta Colindrez as Sabrina
- Perla De La Rosa as Yocasta
- Joaquín Cosío as Lorenzo
- Raúl Castillo as Gerardo / El Comandante
- El Hijo del Santo as himself
- Bad Bunny as Felipe

== Production ==
In July 2020, Gael García Bernal joined the cast of the film, with Roger Ross Williams set to direct from a screenplay he wrote alongside David Teague, with Amazon Studios in negotiations to distribute. They wrote the screenplay over the course of several years. Cassandro is Williams' first narrative film. He previously told Cassandro's story in his 2016 documentary short The Man Without a Mask. In June 2021, Roberta Colindrez and Bad Bunny joined the cast of the film, with Amazon Studios officially set to distribute. The studio would later switch it to a Metro-Goldwyn-Mayer film upon release following the formation of Amazon MGM Studios Distribution.

== Music ==
The music score is by Marcelo Zarvos. The film features songs from the disco era such as "Call Me" by Blondie and "Yes Sir, I Can Boogie" by Baccara.

== Release ==
The film had its world premiere at the 2023 Sundance Film Festival on January 20, 2023. It also screened at the 50th Telluride Film Festival on September 2, 2023. It was released by Amazon MGM Studios in a limited release on September 15, 2023, before streaming via Prime Video on September 22, 2023.

== Reception ==
On the review aggregator website Rotten Tomatoes, 91% of 137 critics' reviews are positive, with an average rating of 7.3/10. The website's consensus reads: "Gael García Bernal steals hearts as the charismatic Cassandro in this feel-good biopic about a wrestler that triumphs in the macho world of Lucha Libre while embracing his true self." Metacritic, which uses a weighted average, assigned the film a score of 76 out of 100, based on 34 critics, indicating "generally favorable" reviews.

David Rooney of The Hollywood Reporter called the film an "entertaining biopic, which doubles as a gorgeous depiction of mother-son love and an exhilarating exploration of fearless queer identity in a macho environment," adding, "Gael García Bernal nails his best role in years, giving a performance steeped in cheeky humor, resilience and radical self-belief."

Carlos Aguilar of Indiewire rated the film a B+, writing, "'Cassandro' balances the triumphant exaltation of Arbendáriz's singular evolution as a trailblazer who didn't set out to become one, with the obvious, still not entirely eliminated bigotry that made his trajectory so significant and groundbreaking in the first place."

Ross Bonaime of Collider wrote that the film "is both riveting and often touching, and Bernal gives quite possibly his best performance in this beautiful story of finding yourself and becoming who you were always supposed to be."

=== Accolades ===
Award	Date of ceremony	Category	Nominee(s)	Result	Ref.
Astra Film Awards	January 6, 2024	Best International Actor	Gael García Bernal	Won	
Astra Film Awards	January 6, 2024	Best International Actress	Roberta Colindrez	Nominated	
GLAAD Media Awards	March 14, 2024	Outstanding Film – Streaming or TV	Cassandro	Nominated	
Women Film Critics Circle Awards	December 18, 2023	Best Actor	Gael García Bernal	4th place	
