= Kathryn Hahn =

American actress (born 1973)

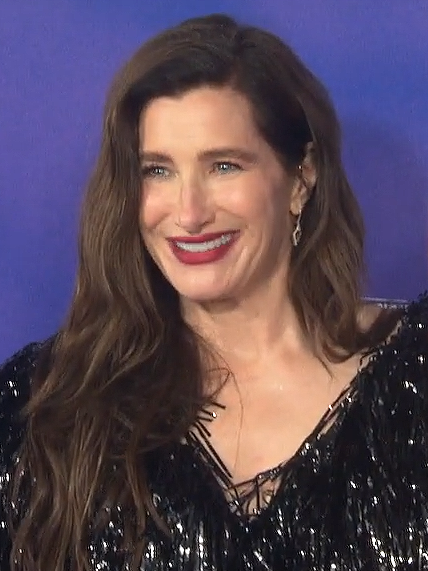
- Hahn in 2024
- Born: Kathryn Marie Hahn; July 23, 1973 (age 53); Westchester, Illinois, U.S.
- Education: Northwestern University (BA); Yale University (MFA)
- Occupation: Actress
- Years active: 1981–present
- Spouse: Ethan Sandler (m. 2002)
- Children: 2

Kathryn Marie Hahn (born July 23, 1973) is an American actress. She gained prominence appearing as a supporting actress in a number of comedy films, including How to Lose a Guy in 10 Days (2003), Anchorman: The Legend of Ron Burgundy (2004), Step Brothers (2008), Our Idiot Brother (2011), We're the Millers, The Secret Life of Walter Mitty (both 2013), and Glass Onion: A Knives Out Mystery (2022).

As a lead actress in film, Hahn has starred in Joey Soloway's comedy-drama Afternoon Delight (2013), the comedy film Bad Moms (2016) and its sequel A Bad Moms Christmas (2017), and Tamara Jenkins's drama Private Life (2018). Hahn voiced Ericka Van Helsing in two films of the Hotel Transylvania franchise (2018–2022) and Olivia Octavius / Doctor Octopus in Spider-Man: Into the Spider-Verse (2018). She joined the Marvel Cinematic Universe portraying Agatha Harkness in the Disney+ limited series WandaVision (2021), and the spin-off Agatha All Along (2024). The role earned her a Primetime Emmy Award and Golden Globe Award nominations.

Hahn also earned Emmy award nominations for portraying a rabbi in the Amazon series Transparent (2014–2019), a writer turned popular columnist in the Hulu series Tiny Beautiful Things (2023), and a film studio's head of marketing in Apple TV+ comedy series The Studio (2025–). She also acted in the NBC sitcom Parks and Recreation (2012–2015), the Amazon Video series I Love Dick (2016–2017), the HBO miniseries Mrs. Fletcher (2019) and I Know This Much Is True (2020), and the Apple TV+ dark comedy series The Shrink Next Door (2021).

== Early life and education ==
Kathryn Marie Hahn was born in Westchester, Illinois, a suburb of Chicago. She is the daughter of Karen Bunker and Bill Hahn. Hahn is of German, Irish, and English descent. She grew up in Cleveland Heights, Ohio, and was raised in the Catholic faith but has said in an interview in 2026 she is no longer Catholic. She attended St. Ann School and Beaumont School, both located in Cleveland Heights. Hahn then attended Northwestern University, where she obtained a BA in theater. Afterward, she earned her MFA in drama from Yale University, where she starred as Sally Bowles in Cabaret and as Célimène in Molière's play, The Misanthrope. While auditioning for roles in her early twenties, Hahn worked as a receptionist and a waitress. Prior to pursuing a career in film and television, Hahn had extensive stage experience. She appeared with the Huntington Theater Company's productions of Jon Robin Baitz's Ten Unknowns and Sidney Kingsley's Dead End, and had parts in the Williamstown Theatre Festival's productions of William Shakespeare's A Midsummer Night's Dream and Hamlet, John Guare's Chaucer in Rome, and Henrik Ibsen's Hedda Gabler.

In 2024, Kathryn Hahn delivered the commencement address to Northwestern University's graduating class and received an honorary Doctor of Arts degree.

== Career ==
=== 1999–2012: Early work ===
Hahn's first appearance on television was in Hickory Hideout, a local puppet show for children for then-NBC owned-and-operated station WKYC in Cleveland. While attending a festival, she was introduced to creator-producer Tim Kring. Hahn impressed Kring so favorably that he created the character of Lily Lebowski in Crossing Jordan specifically for her. The series aired from 2001 to 2007. Hahn has said of meeting Kring, "NBC and Tim Kring took a huge leap of faith in casting me. To be worked into a show that was in production and on the schedule is an amazing stroke of luck." On October 21, 2008, TV Guide reported that Hahn had signed a talent holding deal with Fox.

In 2003, Hahn appeared in a supporting role in the romantic comedy film How to Lose a Guy in 10 Days. The following year she appeared in Win a Date with Tad Hamilton!, Anchorman: The Legend of Ron Burgundy, Around the Bend, and Wake Up, Ron Burgundy: The Lost Movie. She later had more supporting roles in films, including the 2005 romantic comedy-drama A Lot like Love; The Holiday (2006); the science fiction adventure drama The Last Mimzy (2007); Step Brothers (2008); Revolutionary Road (2008); The Goods: Live Hard, Sell Hard (2009), How Do You Know (2010), Our Idiot Brother (2011), and Wanderlust (2012). In 2008, she made her Broadway theatre debut in the revival of the comedy Boeing-Boeing. She starred as Gloria, an American fiancée and airline stewardess. In 2009, she was cast as Eddy in a proposed American remake of the British TV series Absolutely Fabulous. A pilot was filmed but it was not picked up to series.

On television, Hahn starred in the short-lived NBC comedy series Free Agents, a 2011 remake of the British series of the same name. She had recurring roles on HBO shows Hung and Girls. From 2012 to 2015, she received praise for her recurring role on the NBC comedy series Parks and Recreation as Jennifer Barkley, the campaign manager of Leslie Knope's (Amy Poehler) opponent Bobby Newport (Paul Rudd). She received a 2012 Critics' Choice Television Award nomination for Best Guest Performer in a Comedy Series for her performance in Parks and Recreation.

=== 2013–2017: Film and television breakthrough ===
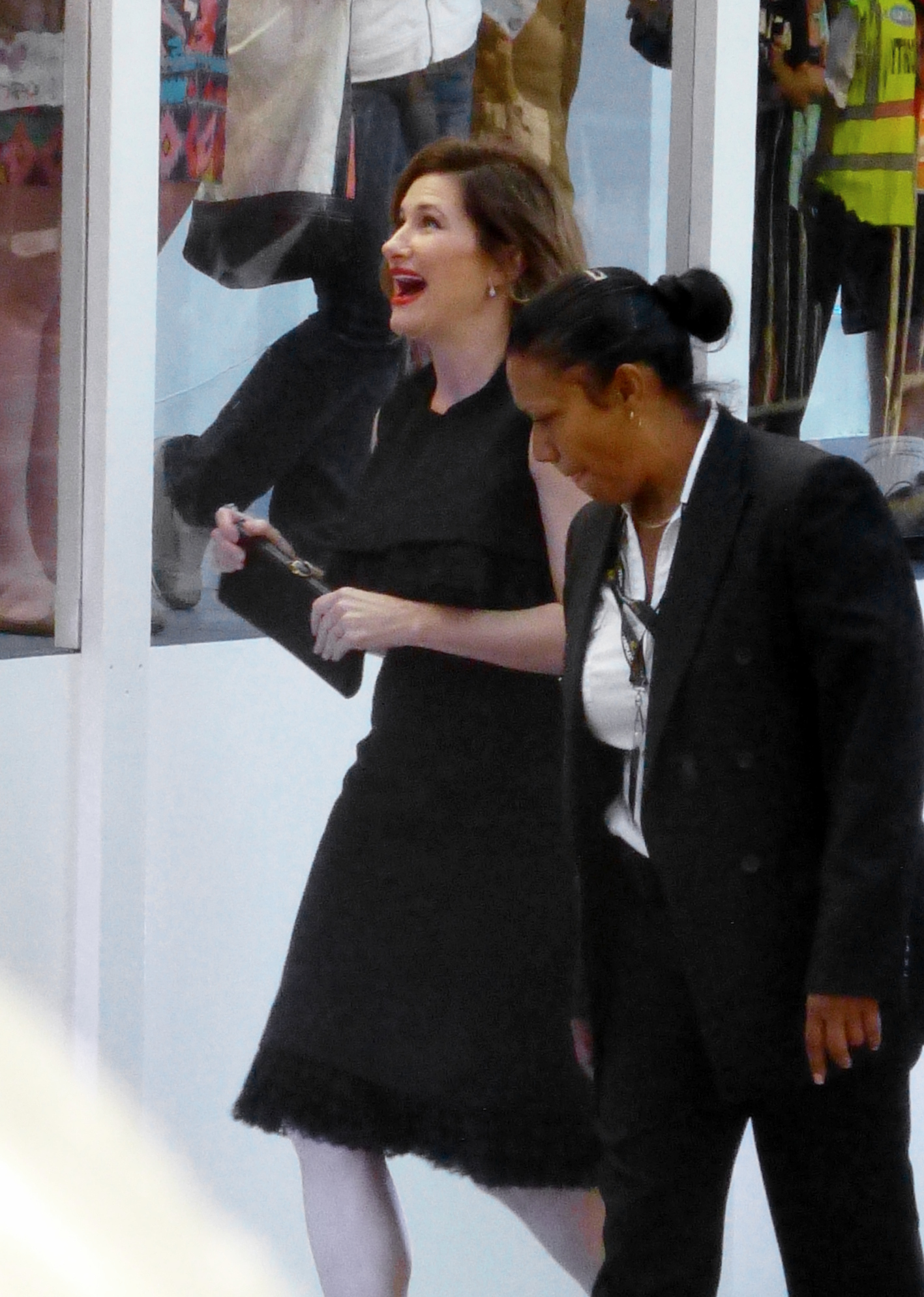
Hahn at the premiere of This Is Where I Leave You in 2014

In 2013, Hahn played her first leading role, in the comedy-drama film Afternoon Delight, which was written and directed by Joey Soloway. The film premiered at the 2013 Sundance Film Festival. For her role, she was nominated for the Gotham Independent Film Award for Breakthrough Actor. Later that year, Hahn appeared in the box-office hit We're the Millers, and co-starred in The Secret Life of Walter Mitty. In 2014 she starred in the comedy film Bad Words, and the ensemble comedy-drama film This Is Where I Leave You.

In 2014, Hahn was cast as Rabbi Raquel Fein in the Amazon Studios critically acclaimed dark comedy-drama Transparent, whose creator, Joey Soloway, had directed her in Afternoon Delight. She received an Emmy nomination for Outstanding Supporting Actress in a Comedy Series (2017) as well as a Screen Actors Guild Award nomination along with the cast. In 2015, Hahn starred in the Showtime comedy-drama Happyish, but the show was canceled after a single season. That year Hahn co-starred in the science-fiction adventure film Tomorrowland, and starred in the box-office horror hit The Visit. She also starred in Peter Bogdanovich's She's Funny That Way.

In 2016, Hahn appeared in the drama film Captain Fantastic, for which the ensemble cast received a Screen Actors Guild Award nomination, and in the comedy film Bad Moms. IndieWire's Kate Erbland gave the film a B−, noting that it "boasts some good jokes but Hahn's revelatory performance is the big draw." The film earned more than $183.9 million with a budget of $20 million. She next appeared in the Amazon comedy series I Love Dick, based on the novel by the same name by Chris Kraus and directed by Joey Soloway. It premiered on August 19, 2016. Following the financial success from Bad Moms, STX Entertainment greenlit a sequel titled A Bad Moms Christmas. It was released in November 2017 and earned more than $130 million with a budget of $28 million. The same year, Hahn authored her first children's book My Wish for You.

=== 2018–present: Focus on television ===
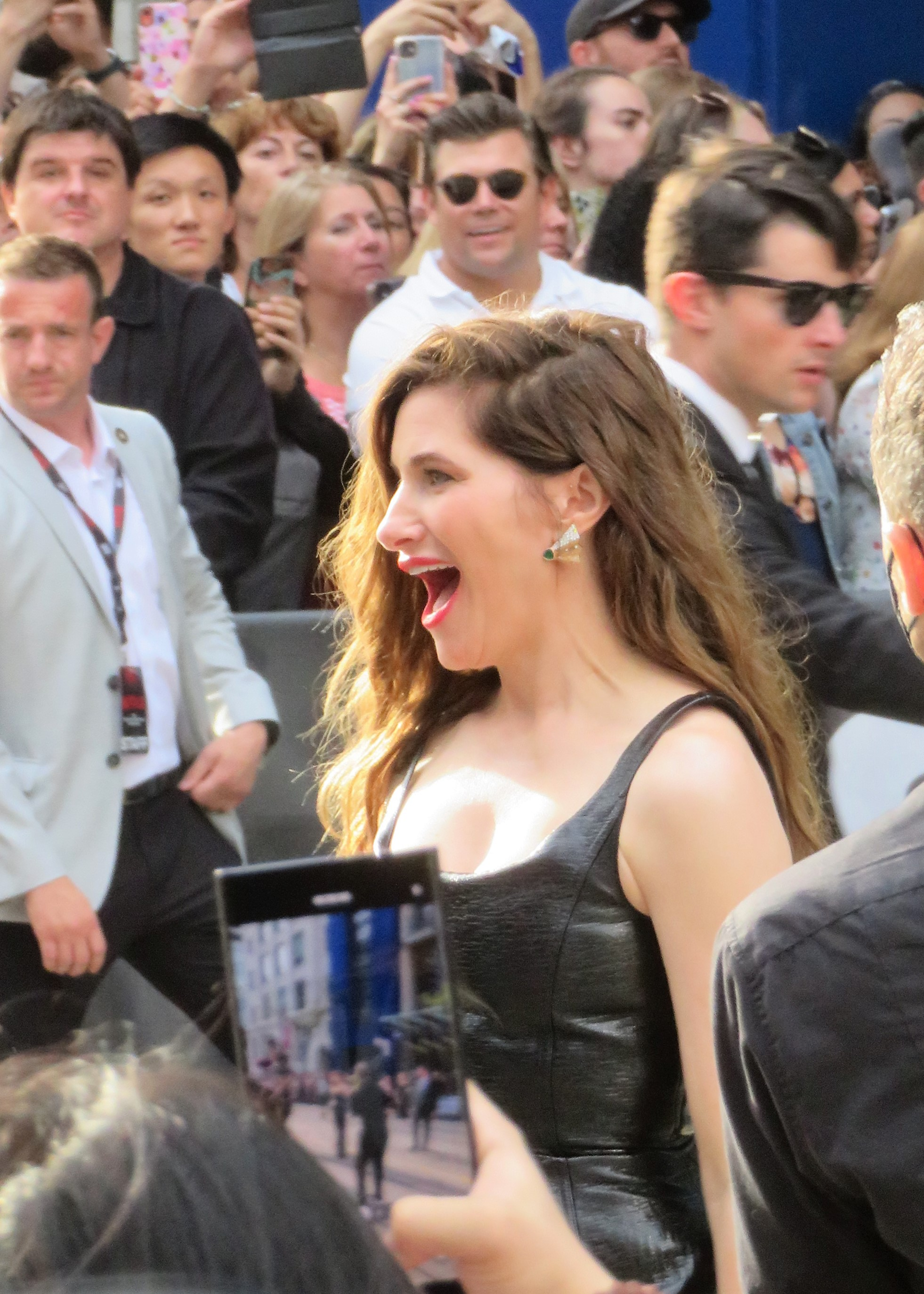
Hahn at the premiere of Glass Onion: A Knives Out Mystery in 2022

In 2018, Hahn starred in the drama film Private Life, directed by Tamara Jenkins. She received critical acclaim for her performance. She began appearing in television commercials for Chrysler. The same year, Hahn had voice roles in two animated films from Sony Pictures Animation. First, Hahn provided the voice of character Ericka Van Helsing in the comedy Hotel Transylvania 3: Summer Vacation. Second, Hahn had a voice role in the film Spider-Man: Into the Spider-Verse, as Dr. Olivia "Liv" Octavius / Doctor Octopus. In 2019, Hahn starred in and produced the HBO comedy miniseries Mrs. Fletcher. Hahn's performance as protagonist Eve Fletcher received critical praise. In 2020, Hahn starred in the HBO drama miniseries I Know This Much Is True, based on the novel of the same name by Wally Lamb. That same year, Hahn began voicing Paige Hunter in the Apple TV+ animated musical comedy series Central Park. Apple Inc. had given a two-season order to Central Park, with each season set to consist of thirteen episodes.

In 2021, Hahn joined the Marvel Cinematic Universe by starring in the Disney+ limited series WandaVision as Agnes, a mysterious "nosy neighbor", later revealed to be Agatha Harkness. The role earned her nominations for a Primetime Emmy Award for Outstanding Supporting Actress and a Critics' Choice Award for Best Supporting Actress. Her character's theme song, "Agatha All Along", went viral. It earned the Primetime Emmy Award for Outstanding Original Music and Lyrics and was nominated for the Grammy Award for Best Song Written for Visual Media. Her next miniseries The Shrink Next Door premiered on Apple TV+ on November 12, 2021. She played Jo Polniaczek in The Facts of Life segment of the third edition of Live in Front of a Studio Audience on December 7, 2021.

In 2022, Hahn starred in Glass Onion: A Knives Out Mystery, the sequel to the 2019 mystery film Knives Out. The role earned her and the rest of the cast a Critics' Choice Award Best Acting Ensemble. During the summer of 2022, Hahn was featured in a series of "Back to School" commercials for Amazon. In June, she was announced to voice Honey in a film titled Fixed. The same month, it was announced that she would star in the upcoming Hulu limited series Tiny Beautiful Things based on the bestselling book by Cheryl Strayed. On April 7, 2023, Hulu released all eight episodes of Tiny Beautiful Things, in which Hahn starred in the lead role of Clare. She was nominated for a Primetime Emmy Award for Outstanding Lead Actress and a Screen Actors Guild Award for Outstanding Female Actor for her performance.

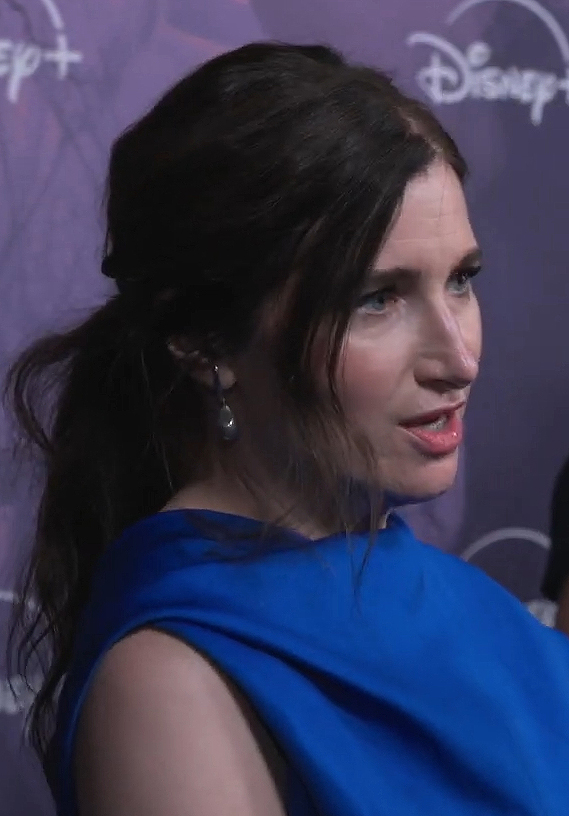
Hahn at the premiere screening of Agatha All Along in 2024

In 2024, Hahn starred in the WandaVision spinoff focused on Agatha Harkness, Agatha All Along. When the series was first reported, it was also stated Hahn signed an overall deal with Marvel Studios. The project, originally titled Agatha: House of Harkness, was retitled Agatha: Coven of Chaos in July 2022, and later to Agatha: Darkhold Diaries in September 2023, and finally to Agatha All Along in May 2024, with episodes released from September through October 2024. For her performance in the series, Hahn was nominated for a Golden Globe Award for Best Actress and an Independent Spirit Award for Best Lead Performance. She reprised her role in the third season of the Disney+ animated series What If...?. Hahn was the guest narrator at the Disneyland Candlelight Processional in December 2024. She also appeared in the third season of the Roku Channel comedy series Die Hart.

Since 2025, Hahn has been starring in the critically acclaimed Apple TV+ comedy series The Studio as Maya Mason, a role which earned her a nomination for a Primetime Emmy Award for Outstanding Supporting Actress. She is also set to star in David O. Russel's upcoming sports drama film Madden as Virginia Madden opposite Nicolas Cage. In January 2026, Hahn entered talks to play Mother Gothel in a live-action film adaptation of Tangled. Hahn confirmed her casting in March of that year.

== Personal life ==
Since 2002, Hahn has been married to actor Ethan Sandler, whom she met at Northwestern University. They reside in Los Feliz, Los Angeles and have two children.

Hahn has been a long-term supporter of Planned Parenthood, and participated in their Get Out The Vote campaign in 2018. For her continued advocacy and support of LGBTQ+ rights, Hahn is a two-time holder of the Human Rights Campaign's Ally for Equality Award. Hahn has also been active in animal advocacy. As of 2021, her family has two rescue dogs and fostered three kittens during the COVID-19 pandemic. In September 2024, Hahn partnered with The Dodo for a special segment where she spent time with animals in need of homes.

== Acting credits ==
Key
†	Denotes productions that have not yet been released

=== Film ===
Year	Title	Role	Notes
1999	Flushed	Woman	
2003	How to Lose a Guy in 10 Days	Michelle Rueben	
2004	Win a Date with Tad Hamilton!	Angelica	
2004	Anchorman: The Legend of Ron Burgundy	Helen	
2004	Around the Bend	Sarah	
2004	Wake Up, Ron Burgundy: The Lost Movie	Helen	
2005	A Lot like Love	Michelle	
2006	The Holiday	Bristol	
2007	The Last Mimzy	Naomi Schwartz	
2008	Step Brothers	Alice Huff	
2008	Revolutionary Road	Milly Campbell	
2009	The Goods: Live Hard, Sell Hard	Babs Merrick	
2010	How Do You Know	Annie	
2011	Our Idiot Brother	Janet	
2012	Wanderlust	Karen	
2012	The Dictator	Pregnant Woman	
2013	Afternoon Delight	Rachel	
2013	We're the Millers	Edie Fitzgerald	
2013	Dark Around the Stars	Judith	
2013	The Secret Life of Walter Mitty	Odessa Mitty	
2014	Bad Words	Jenny Widgeon	
2014	This Is Where I Leave You	Annie Altman	
2015	She's Funny That Way	Delta Simmons	
2015	The D Train	Stacey	
2015	Tomorrowland	Ursula Gernsback	
2015	Len and Company	Isabelle	
2015	The Visit	Loretta Jamison	
2015	The Family Fang	Camille Fang	
2016	Captain Fantastic	Harper Cash	
2016	The Do-Over	Becca	
2016	Bad Moms	Carla Dunkler	
2017	Flower	Laurie Vandross	
2017	A Bad Moms Christmas	Carla Dunkler	
2018	Private Life	Rachel Biegler	
2018	Hotel Transylvania 3: Summer Vacation	Ericka Van Helsing	Voice
2018	Spider-Man: Into the Spider-Verse	Dr. Olivia "Liv" Octavius / Doctor Octopus	Voice
2022	Hotel Transylvania: Transformania	Ericka Van Helsing	Voice
2022	Glass Onion: A Knives Out Mystery	Claire Debella	
2023	Spider-Man: Across the Spider-Verse	Dr. Olivia "Liv" Octavius / Doctor Octopus	Voice; archival audio
2025	Fixed	Honey	Voice
2026	Madden	Virginia Madden	
2028	Tangled †	Mother Gothel	Filming

=== Television ===
Year	Title	Role	Notes
1981–1991	Hickory Hideout	Jenny	
2001–2007	Crossing Jordan	Lily Lebowski	Main cast; 104 episodes
2006	Four Kings	Sharon	2 episodes
2009	Ab Fab (Note: US remake of Absolutely Fabulous.)	Eddy	Pilot episode only. Series not picked up.
2010	Hung	Claire	3 episodes
2011	Funny or Die Presents	Huntress	2 episodes
2011	Traffic Light	Kate	2 episodes
2011	Mad Love	Linda Clay	Episode: "Friends"
2011	Free Agents	Helen	Main role; 8 episodes
2012–2015	Parks and Recreation	Jennifer Barkley	11 episodes
2012	Girls	Katherine Lavoyt	4 episodes
2012	The Newsroom	Carrie	Episode: "I'll Try to Fix You"
2012	Childrens Hospital	Lamaze Teacher	Episode: "Childrens Lawspital"
2012	Robot Chicken	Mrs. Marquez / T-shirt Girl #1	Voice, episode: "Hemlock, Gin and Juice"
2013–2015	Kroll Show	Mikey's Mom	5 episodes
2013	NTSF:SD:SUV::	Marge	Episode: "TGI Murder"
2013	The Greatest Event in Television History	Greta Strauss / Sara Rush	2 episodes
2014, 2020, 2022	Bob's Burgers	Jessica	Voice, 3 episodes
2014	Chozen	Tracy	Voice, 8 episodes
2014	American Dad!	Luli	Voice, episode: "Honey, I'm Homeland"
2014–2019	Transparent	Raquel Fein	Main cast; 22 episodes
2015	Happyish	Lee Payne	Main role; 10 episodes
2015	Last Week Tonight with John Oliver	Wife	Episode: "Daily Fantasy Sports"
2015	Comedy Bang! Bang!	Herself	Episode: "Kathryn Hahn Wears Ripped Jeans and Black Heels"
2016	Brooklyn Nine-Nine	Eleanor Horstweil	Episode: "Hostage Situation"
2016–2017	I Love Dick	Chris Kraus	Main role; also executive producer; 8 episodes
2018	The Romanoffs	Anka	Episode: "End of the Line"
2018	Angie Tribeca	Susan	Episode: "Air Force Two"
2019	Mrs. Fletcher	Eve Fletcher	Lead role; also producer; 7 episodes
2020	I Know This Much Is True	Dessa Constantine	Main cast; 6 episodes
2020–2022	Central Park	Paige Hunter	Voice, 39 episodes
2020	Make It Work!	Herself	Television special
2021	WandaVision	Agatha Harkness / "Agnes"	Main cast; 9 episodes
2021	The Shrink Next Door	Phyllis Markowitz	Main cast; 8 episodes
2021	Live in Front of a Studio Audience	Jo Polniaczek	Episode: "Diff'rent Strokes and The Facts of Life"
2021–2024	Marvel Studios: Assembled	Herself	2 episodes
2023	Tiny Beautiful Things	Clare Pierce	Main role; also executive producer; 8 episodes
2024	Agatha All Along	Agatha Harkness / "Agnes O'Connor"	Lead role; 9 episodes; also contributed to soundtrack
2024	Die Hart	Jillian Jones	Main cast; 7 episodes
2024	What If...?	Agatha Harkness	Voice, episode: "What If... Agatha Went to Hollywood?"
2025	Chautauqua at 150: Wynton Marsalis’ All Rise	Herself	Television film
2025–present	The Studio	Maya Mason	Main cast
2026	Life, Larry and the Pursuit of Unhappiness	Mary Todd Lincoln	Episode: "Lincoln"
2027	Oswald	TBA	Post-production

=== Theater ===
Year	Title	Role	Playwright	Venue	Ref.
2005	Dead End	Drina	Sidney Kingsley	Ahmanson Theatre, Los Angeles	
2008 (Note: April 19 – October 5, 2008)	Boeing-Boeing	Gloria	Marc Camoletti	Longacre Theatre, Broadway	

=== Other Credits ===
Year	Title	Role	Media Type	Produced By	Ref
2024	E. Jean Carroll v. Donald Trump	E. Jean Carroll	Documentary Short	Brave New Films	

== Awards and nominations ==
Organizations	Year	Category	Work	Result	Ref.
Actor Awards	2016	Outstanding Ensemble in a Comedy Series	Transparent	Nominated	
Actor Awards	2016	Outstanding Cast in a Motion Picture	Captain Fantastic	Nominated	
Actor Awards	2023	Outstanding Actress in a Miniseries or Television Movie	Tiny Beautiful Things	Nominated	
Actor Awards	2026	Outstanding Ensemble in a Comedy Series	The Studio	Won	
African-American Film Critics Association	2022	Best Ensemble	Glass Onion: A Knives Out Mystery	Won	
Astra TV Awards	2023	Best Actress in a Limited Series or Streaming Movie	Tiny Beautiful Things	Nominated	
Astra TV Awards	2025	Best Actress in a Comedy Series	Agatha All Along	Nominated	
Astra TV Awards	2025	Best Cast Ensemble in a Streaming Comedy Series	Agatha All Along	Nominated	
Astra TV Awards	2025	Best Cast Ensemble in a Streaming Comedy Series	The Studio	Nominated	
Austin Film Critics Association	2022	Best Ensemble	Glass Onion: A Knives Out Mystery	Nominated	
Capri Hollywood International Film Festival	2022	Best Ensemble Cast	Glass Onion: A Knives Out Mystery	Won	
CinemaCon	2016	Female Stars of the Year (Note: (shared with Mila Kunis, Kristen Bell, Christina Applegate, Annie Mumolo))	Bad Moms	Won	
Critics' Choice Movie Awards	2022	Best Acting Ensemble	Glass Onion: A Knives Out Mystery	Won	
Critics' Choice Super Awards	2022	Best Actress in a Superhero Series	WandaVision	Nominated	
Critics' Choice Super Awards	2022	Best Villain in a Series	WandaVision	Won	
Critics' Choice Super Awards	2025	Best Actress in a Superhero Series, Limited Series or TV Movie	Agatha All Along	Nominated	
Critics' Choice Super Awards	2025	Best Actress in a Sci-Fi / Fantasy Series, Limited Series or TV Movie	Agatha All Along	Nominated	
Critics' Choice Television Awards	2012	Best Guest Performer in a Comedy Series	Parks and Recreation	Nominated	
Critics' Choice Television Awards	2021	Best Supporting Actress in a Miniseries or TV Movie	WandaVision	Nominated	
Detroit Film Critics Society	2008	Best Ensemble	Revolutionary Road	Nominated	
Dorian Awards	2021	Best Supporting TV Performance	WandaVision	Won	
Dorian Awards	2021	Best TV Musical Performance	WandaVision	Won	
Dorian Awards	2021	Wilde Wit of the Year	—N/a	Nominated	
Dorian Awards	2025	Best TV Performance — Comedy	Agatha All Along	Nominated	
Dorian Awards	2025	Best TV Musical Performance	Agatha All Along	Nominated	
Georgia Film Critics Association	2022	Best Ensemble	Glass Onion: A Knives Out Story	Won	
Gold Derby Awards	2012	Comedy Guest Actress	Parks and Recreation	Nominated	
Gold Derby Awards	2019	Comedy Guest Actress of the Decade	Parks and Recreation	Nominated	
Gold Derby Awards	2021	Movie/Limited Series Supporting Actress	WandaVision	Won	
Gold Derby Awards	2022	Ensemble Cast	Glass Onion: A Knives Out Mystery	Won	
Gold Derby Awards	2025	Comedy Actress	Agatha All Along	Won	
Gold Derby Awards	2025	Comedy Supporting Actress	The Studio	Nominated	
Gold Derby Awards	2025	Performer of the Year	Agatha All Along / The Studio	Won	
Golden Globe Awards	2024	Best Actress – Television Series Musical or Comedy	Agatha All Along	Nominated	
Gotham Awards	2013	Breakthrough Actor	Afternoon Delight	Nominated	
Gotham Awards	2018	Best Actress	Private Life	Nominated	
HCA Awards	2022	Best Cast Ensemble	Glass Onion: A Knives Out Mystery	Nominated	
HCA TV Awards	2021	Best Supporting Actress in a Limited Series, or Television Movie	WandaVision	Won	
Houston Film Critics Society	2022	Best Ensemble Cast	Glass Onion: A Knives Out Mystery	Nominated	
Human Rights Campaign	2016	Ally for Equality Award	—N/a	Won	
Human Rights Campaign	2024	Ally for Equality Award	—N/a	Won	
IMDb STARmeter Awards	2025	Fan Favorite Ensemble	The Studio	Won	
Independent Spirit Awards	2024	Best Lead Performance in a New Scripted Series	Agatha All Along	Nominated	
International Online Cinema Awards	2015	Best Ensemble in a Comedy Series	Transparent	Nominated	
International Online Cinema Awards	2018	Best Supporting Actress in a Comedy Series	Transparent	Nominated	
International Online Cinema Awards	2018	Best Ensemble in a Comedy Series	Transparent	Nominated	
International Online Cinema Awards	2021	Best Supporting Actress in a Comedy Series	WandaVision	Nominated	
Miami International Film Festival	2022	Ensemble Award	Glass Onion: A Knives Out Mystery	Won	
MTV Movie & TV Awards	2021	Best Villain	WandaVision	Won	
MTV Movie & TV Awards	2021	Best Fight (shared with Elizabeth Olsen)	WandaVision	Won	
Music Supervisors Guild Awards	2025	Best Song Written and/or Recorded for Television (Note: (shared with Kristen Anderson-Lopez, Robert Lopez, Ali Ahn, Patti LuPone, Debra Jo Rupp, Sasheer Zamata, Dave Jordan, and Justine von Winterfeldt))	Agatha All Along	Won	
New York Film Critics Online Awards	2022	Best Ensemble Cast	Glass Onion: A Knives Out Mystery	Won	
Online Film & Television Awards	2018	Best Supporting Actress in a Limited Series or TV Movie	Transparent	Nominated	
Online Film & Television Awards	2021	Best Supporting Actress in a Motion Picture or Limited Series	WandaVision	Won	
Online Film & Television Awards	2023	Best Actress in a Motion Picture / Limited Series	Tiny Beautiful Things	Nominated	
Online Film & Television Awards	2023	Best Casting & Ensemble in a Motion Picture / Limited Series	Tiny Beautiful Things	Nominated	
Online Film & Television Awards	2025	Best Actress in a Comedy Series	Agatha All Along	Nominated	
Online Film & Television Awards	2025	Best Casting & Ensemble in a Comedy Series	The Studio	Won	
Palm Springs International Film Festival	2009	Ensemble Cast	Revolutionary Road	Won	
People's Choice Awards	2021	Female TV Star of 2021	WandaVision	Nominated	
Primetime Emmy Awards	2017	Outstanding Supporting Actress in a Comedy Series	Transparent (for "Life Sucks Then You Die")	Nominated	
Primetime Emmy Awards	2021	Outstanding Supporting Actress in a Limited Series or Movie	WandaVision	Nominated	
Primetime Emmy Awards	2023	Outstanding Lead Actress in a Limited Series or Movie	Tiny Beautiful Things	Nominated	
Primetime Emmy Awards	2025	Outstanding Supporting Actress in a Comedy Series	The Studio (for "Casting")	Nominated	
San Diego International Film Festival	2021	Fairbanks Award	—N/a	Won	
San Diego Film Critics Society	2022	Best Ensemble	Glass Onion: A Knives Out Mystery	Nominated	
Satellite Awards	2017	Best Actress – Television Series Musical or Comedy	I Love Dick	Nominated	
Satellite Awards	2022	Best Ensemble – Motion Picture	Glass Onion: A Knives Out Mystery	Won	
Satellite Awards	2023	Best Actress in a Miniseries or Television Film	Tiny Beautiful Things	Nominated	
Saturn Awards	2021	Best Supporting Actress in a Streaming Television Series	WandaVision	Nominated	
Saturn Awards	2023	Best Actress in a Television Series	Agatha All Along	Nominated	
Savannah Film Festival	2024	Spotlight in Television Award	—N/a	Honored	
Seattle Film Critics Society	2017	Best Ensemble Cast	Captain Fantastic	Nominated	
St. Louis Gateway Film Critics Association	2022	Best Ensemble	Glass Onion: A Knives Out Mystery	Runner-up	
Tell-Tale TV Awards	2025	Favorite Performer in a Limited Series	Agatha All Along	Won	
Washington D.C. Area Film Critics Association	2022	Best Acting Ensemble	Glass Onion: A Knives Out Mystery	Won	
Women Film Critics Circle	2018	Best Comedic Actress	Private Life	Nominated	

== Discography ==
Music recordings by Kathryn Hahn
Year	Title	Album
2019	"Sit In It"	Transparent Musicale Finale (Original Soundtrack)
2019	"Crazy People"	Transparent Musicale Finale (Original Soundtrack)
2020	"Own It"	Central Park Season One, The Soundtrack - Song-Tral Park (Original Soundtrack)
2020	"Momma's Got This"	Central Park Season One, The Soundtrack - Song-Tral Park (Original Soundtrack)
2020	"Momma's Got This Reprise"	Central Park Season One, The Soundtrack - Song-Tral Park (Original Soundtrack)
2020	"The Park Is Mine"	Central Park Season One, The Soundtrack - Song-Tral Park (Original Soundtrack)
2020	"Rats"	Central Park Season One, The Soundtrack - Song-Tral Park (Original Soundtrack)
2020	"Rats - End Credits"	Central Park Season One, The Soundtrack - Song-Tral Park (Original Soundtrack)
2020	"Show Up"	Central Park Season One, The Soundtrack - Song-Tral Park (Original Soundtrack)
2020	"Nuts Nuts Nuts"	Central Park Season One, The Soundtrack - Song-Tral Park (Original Soundtrack)
2020	"Can We Do Today Again?"	Central Park Season One, The Soundtrack - Song-Tral Park (Original Soundtrack)
2020	"Can We Do Today Again? Reprise"	Central Park Season One, The Soundtrack - Song-Tral Park (Original Soundtrack)
2020	"Imperfectly Perfect"	Central Park Season One, The Soundtrack - Song-Tral Park (Original Soundtrack)
2020	"I Did Not Account for This"	Central Park Season One, The Soundtrack - Song-Tral Park (Original Soundtrack)
2020	"Live It Up Tonight - End Credits"	Central Park Season One, The Soundtrack - Song-Tral Park (Original Soundtrack)
2020	"Die Trying"	Central Park Season One, The Soundtrack - Song-Tral Park (Original Soundtrack)
2021	"Middle of It All"	Central Park Season Two, The Soundtrack - Songs In The Key Of Park (Vol. 1) (Original Soundtrack)
2021	"W(h)itch Way"	Central Park Season Two, The Soundtrack - Songs In The Key Of Park (Vol. 1) (Original Soundtrack)
2021	"Promise"	Central Park Season Two, The Soundtrack - Songs In The Key Of Park (Vol. 1) (Original Soundtrack)
2021	"No One's Home"	Central Park Season Two, The Soundtrack - Songs In The Key Of Park (Vol. 1) (Original Soundtrack)
2021	"The Answer Is Ward"	Central Park Season Two, The Soundtrack - Songs In The Key Of Park (Vol. 1) (Original Soundtrack)
2021	"Down to the Wire"	Central Park Season Two, The Soundtrack - Songs In The Key Of Park (Vol. 1) (Original Soundtrack)
2021	"How It Happened"	Central Park Season Two, The Soundtrack - Songs In The Key Of Park (Vol. 1) (Original Soundtrack)
2021	"How It Happened Reprise"	Central Park Season Two, The Soundtrack - Songs In The Key Of Park (Vol. 1) (Original Soundtrack)
2021	"A Different Paige"	Central Park Season Two, The Soundtrack - Songs In The Key Of Park (Vol. 1) (Original Soundtrack)
2021	"A Different Paige (End Credit)"	Central Park Season Two, The Soundtrack - Songs In The Key Of Park (Vol. 1) (Original Soundtrack)
2021	"Agatha All Along"	WandaVision: Episode 7 (Original Soundtrack)
2022	"From a New Angle"	Central Park Season Two, The Soundtrack - Songs In The Key Of Park (Original Soundtrack)
2022	"Rockin' On the Rag"	Central Park Season Two, The Soundtrack - Songs In The Key Of Park (Original Soundtrack)
2022	"Why Me Waikiki"	Central Park Season Two, The Soundtrack - Songs In The Key Of Park (Original Soundtrack)
2022	"It Stings"	Central Park Season Two, The Soundtrack - Songs In The Key Of Park (Original Soundtrack)
2022	"Flyin' High"	Central Park Season Two, The Soundtrack - Songs In The Key Of Park (Original Soundtrack)
2022	"A Few Minutes for Magic"	Central Park Season Two, The Soundtrack - Songs In The Key Of Park (Original Soundtrack)
2022	"Where the Bottom Falls Out"	Central Park Season Two, The Soundtrack - Songs In The Key Of Park (Original Soundtrack)
2022	"Maybe Potentially Great"	Central Park Season Two, The Soundtrack - Songs In The Key Of Park (Original Soundtrack)
2022	"Restoration"	Central Park Season Two, The Soundtrack - Songs In The Key Of Park (Original Soundtrack)
2022	"Onto Something"	Central Park Season Two, The Soundtrack - Songs In The Key Of Park (Original Soundtrack)
2022	"Gotta Grab It"	Central Park Season Two, The Soundtrack - Songs In The Key Of Park (Original Soundtrack)
2022	"Time to Close"	Central Park Season Two, The Soundtrack - Songs In The Key Of Park (Original Soundtrack)
2022	"A Walk in the Park"	Central Park Season Two, The Soundtrack - Songs In The Key Of Park (Original Soundtrack)
2022	"Room to Grow"	Central Park Season Three, The Soundtrack - The Central Track Sound Park (Original Soundtrack)
2022	"All Lining Up"	Central Park Season Three, The Soundtrack - The Central Track Sound Park (Original Soundtrack)
2022	"One Foot in the Door"	Central Park Season Three, The Soundtrack - The Central Track Sound Park (Original Soundtrack)
2022	"Working Song"	Central Park Season Three, The Soundtrack - The Central Track Sound Park (Original Soundtrack)
2022	"A Positive Light"	Central Park Season Three, The Soundtrack - The Central Track Sound Park (Original Soundtrack)
2022	"A Real Whodunnit"	Central Park Season Three, The Soundtrack - The Central Track Sound Park (Original Soundtrack)
2022	"Me and the Girls"	Central Park Season Three, The Soundtrack - The Central Track Sound Park (Original Soundtrack)
2022	"One Step at a Time"	Central Park Season Three, The Soundtrack - The Central Track Sound Park (Original Soundtrack)
2022	"Tick Tock"	Central Park Season Three, The Soundtrack - The Central Track Sound Park (Original Soundtrack)
2022	"I Got the Goods"	Central Park Season Three, The Soundtrack - The Central Track Sound Park (Original Soundtrack)
2022	"I Got the Goods (End Credits)"	Central Park Season Three, The Soundtrack - The Central Track Sound Park (Original Soundtrack)
2022	"Money Candy Peed in Our Bathroom"	Central Park Season Three, The Soundtrack - The Central Track Sound Park (Original Soundtrack)
2022	"I Will Find You (End Credits)	Central Park Season Three, The Soundtrack - The Central Track Sound Park (Original Soundtrack)
2022	"Perfect Fit"	Central Park Season Three, The Soundtrack - The Central Track Sound Park (Original Soundtrack)
2022	"Higher and Higher"	Central Park Season Three, The Soundtrack - The Central Track Sound Park (Original Soundtrack)
2022	"Love Comes Back Around"	Central Park Season Three, The Soundtrack - The Central Track Sound Park (Original Soundtrack)
2024	"The Ballad of the Witches' Road (Sacred Chant Version)"	Agatha All Along: Vol. 1 (Episodes 1–5) (Original Soundtrack)
2024	"The Ballad of the Witches' Road (Cover Version)"	Agatha All Along: Vol. 1 (Episodes 1–5) (Original Soundtrack)
2024	"The Ballad of the Witches' Road (Agatha Through Time Version)"	Agatha All Along: Vol. 2 (Episodes 6–9) (Original Soundtrack)

== Bibliography ==
- My Wish for You (2017)
