= Sarah Hay =

American actress and ballerina (born 1987)

- Born: September 16, 1987 (age 38)
- Occupations: Ballet dancer; actress; producer
- Years active: 1997–present
- Spouse: Brandon Boyd
- Website: instagram.com/sarahhayofficial

Sarah Hay (born September 16, 1987) is an American actress and ballerina. She is best known for her role as Claire Robbins in the Starz mini-series Flesh and Bone, she was nominated for a Golden Globe, a Satellite Award and a Critics' Choice Television Award.

== Early life ==
Sarah Hay was brought up in Princeton, New Jersey and New York City, alongside her older brother and sister. Her grandmother was an art dealer in New York City, and her grandfather is a member of the New York Philharmonic. Hay's parents are both psychologists. Her godmother is magician’s assistant Debbie McGee. She began attending dance classes at the age of three and later attended the Jacqueline Kennedy Onassis School of Ballet at the American Ballet Theatre. She later explained that while she was popular at normal school, at the ballet school she was considered to be a "loser" because she wasn't from a wealthy background. She described herself as a "troublemaker" during her childhood, and only decided to pursue ballet professionally when she was a teenager.

== Career ==
=== Ballet ===
Once she decided to become a professional ballet dancer, she sacrificed other pursuits, saying in a 2015 interview with the New York Post that she "had a few relationships fall apart because of it." While others have described her as "workaholic," she prefers "motivated." At the age of 22, she moved to Germany to join the Dresden based Semperoper ballet.

=== Acting ===
Hay made her acting debut in 1997 when she was cast as Stephanie in You're Invited to Mary-Kate and Ashley's Ballet Party, starring Mary-Kate Olsen and Ashley Olsen. She made her film debut in 2010 as a dancer in Black Swan, but she did not consider herself to have made an acting appearance until she was cast in the Starz mini-series Flesh and Bone.

== Filmography ==
=== Film ===
Year	Title	Role	Notes
1997	You're Invited to Mary-Kate & Ashley's Ballet Party	Stephanie	Short
2010	Black Swan	Corps De Ballet	
2017	It's No Game	Rhea L Deal	Short
2018	Braid	Tilda Darlings / Daughter	
2019	Extracurricular Activities	Sydney Vaughn	
2019	The Mortuary Collection	Carol	
2022	Confession	Alicia	
2022	Mid-Century	Marie Verdin	
2022	Unidentified Objects	Winona	
TBA	Twin Flames	Ella	Short, post-production

=== Television ===
Year	Title	Role	Notes
2015	Flesh and Bone	Claire Robbins	Main role
2017	I'm Dying Up Here	Tawny Lee	Episodes: "The Return", "Girls Are Funny, Too", "My Rifle, My Pony and Me", "The Unbelievable Power of Believing"
2017	Room 104	Girl	Episode: "Voyeurs"
2017	Sea Oak	Angela Silveri	TV pilot
2018	9-1-1	Jesse	Episode: "Pilot"
2019	The Lost Boys	Mollie	TV pilot

== Awards and nominations ==
Year	Association	Category	Nominated work	Result	Ref.
2016	Golden Globe Award	Best Actress – Miniseries or Television Film	Flesh and Bone	Nominated	
2016	Satellite Award	Best Actress – Miniseries or Television Film	Flesh and Bone	Won	
2016	Critics' Choice Television Award	Best Actress in a Movie/Miniseries	Flesh and Bone	Nominated	
2016	Women's Image Network Awards	Actress Made For Television Movie/Miniseries	Flesh and Bone	Nominated	
