= Vanessa Zoltan =

American humanist chaplain

Vanessa Zoltan is a humanist chaplain who describes herself as an "atheist chaplain". She is a graduate of Harvard Divinity School, and holds a BA in English and writing from Washington University in St. Louis, and a MS in nonprofit management from the University of Pennsylvania. She has been called one of "few" feminist humanist chaplains in the world.

== Background ==
=== Personal life ===
Zoltan, who stated on CNN that all four of her grandparents were Auschwitz survivors, has said she identifies as "an atheist and a Jew and a humanist".

In December 2022, Zoltan married Peter Mueller, a chemist at the Massachusetts Institute of Technology.

=== Early career ===
Zoltan was a member of Washington University's premier improvisational comedy troupe Mama's Pot Roast from 2002-2004.

She served as Assistant Humanist Chaplain at Harvard University from 2013 to 2016.

Zoltan has delivered talks on interpretation of works such as Jane Eyre and Harry Potter as sacred texts.

In March 2019, Zoltan was a recipient of the Gomes Honors from Harvard Divinity School. According to Dean David N. Hempton the 2019 Gomes Honorees "are the spiritual innovators that shape communities of meaning, the vibrancy and diversity of which will be critical to human flourishing in the years to come".

== Career ==
=== Podcasts ===
In May 2016, Zoltan and collaborator Casper ter Kuile inaugurated the Harry Potter and the Sacred Text Podcast, a weekly podcast that attempts to read the Harry Potter books as a sacred text. Under the mentorship of Stephanie Paulsell the two explore the characters and context of one chapter per episode through a different central theme, like "vulnerability," "betrayal," or "friendship." This show was distributed by the Panoply network, which went out of business in 2018. Zoltan and ter Kuile began fundraising to keep the show alive due to the abrupt loss of advertising revenue, and short after the podcast was added to the roster of the Night Vale Presents network in 2019. Then Zoltan was able to use the fundraised money to kickstart their own production company: Not Sorry Productions, which is supported partly from advertising and partly through Patreon.

Harry Potter and the Sacred Text charted #2 on the iTunes Podcast Chart in the US on August 18, 2016, after 13 episodes had aired. The podcast has around 9 million downloads per year and repeatedly featured among the top downloads for Religion and Spirituality in iTunes.

Zoltan, with Not Sorry Productions, also created a new podcast, Hot and Bothered, which explores writing romance novels as a sacred practice. In 2021, the production company is set to launch a new show called The Real Question with Zoltan and ter Kuile as co-hosts.

=== Writing ===
Zoltan published her first book with Penguin Random House on July 6, 2021: Praying with Jane Eyre: Reflections on Reading as a Sacred Practice.
