= Nicholas Monk (literary critic) =

British literary critic

Academic background
- Education: University of Reading (BA); University of Warwick (MA); Rutgers University (MA); University of Warwick (PhD)

Academic work
- Discipline: literary critic
- Institutions: Brown University

Nicholas Monk is a literary critic and university administrator. He is currently executive director of the Sheridan Center for Teaching and Learning at Brown University. Formerly he was a courtesy Professor of English at the University of Nebraska–Lincoln. He is known for his works on Cormac McCarthy's fiction. Monk was a professor in the Department of English at the University of Warwick, and a founding member of Warwick's Institute for Advanced Teaching and Learning, where he was Director from 2016 to 2019. Monk has been a Higher Education Academy National Teaching Fellow since 2013. He won Warwick's Butterworth Award for Teaching Excellence in 2008/9 and was Honorary Associate Professor at Monash University, Melbourne (2014–19).

== Books ==
- True and Living Prophet of Destruction: Cormac McCarthy and Modernity, University of New Mexico Press 2016
- Monk, Nicholas et al. Open-space Learning: a Study in Interdisciplinary Pedagogy, Bloomsbury 2011
- Monk, Nicholas, et al., eds. Identity: A Transdisciplinary Approach, Palgrave-MacMillan 2017
