= 56th Tony Awards =

2002 US theatrical awards ceremony

- Official poster for the 56th annual Tony Awards
- Date: June 2, 2002
- Location: Radio City Music Hall, New York City, New York
- Hosted by: Bernadette Peters; Gregory Hines

Highlights
- Most wins: Thoroughly Modern Millie (6)
- Most nominations: Thoroughly Modern Millie (11)
- Website: tonyawards.com

Television/radio coverage
- Network: CBS
- Viewership: 7.9 million
- Produced by: Ricky Kirshner; Gary Smith
- Directed by: Glenn Weiss

The 56th Annual Tony Awards ceremony was held at Radio City Music Hall on June 2, 2002 and broadcast by CBS. "The First Ten" awards ceremony, produced in association with Thirteen/WNET New York was telecast on PBS television. The event was co-hosted by Bernadette Peters and Gregory Hines.

With her win as a producer of Thoroughly Modern Millie, Whoopi Goldberg became the 10th person to become an EGOT winner.

== The ceremony ==
The show opened with a tribute to Richard Rodgers, featuring a medley of his songs performed by Marvin Hamlisch, Harry Connick Jr., Michele Lee, Mos Def, Lea Salonga, Peter Gallagher, John Raitt, Bernadette Peters, Gregory Hines, and the company of Oklahoma! A Broadway/New York song medley was performed by Bernadette Peters and Gregory Hines.

Presentations from nominated musicals:

- Into the Woods: "Children Will Listen", "Ever After" and "Into the Woods" - Vanessa Williams, John McMartin, Company
- Mamma Mia!: "I Have a Dream", "Money, Money, Money", "Mamma Mia", "Chiquitita" and "Dancing Queen" - Louise Pitre, Judy Kaye, Karen Mason, Tina Maddigan, Company
- Thoroughly Modern Millie: "Forget About the Boy"/"Thoroughly Modern Millie" - Sutton Foster, Anne L. Nathan, Casey Nicholaw, Noah Racey, Company
- Sweet Smell of Success: "Dirt" - John Lithgow, Company
- Urinetown: "Run, Freedom, Run" - Hunter Foster, Spencer Kayden, Jeff McCarthy, Company
- Oklahoma!: "The Farmer and the Cowman" - Company

The First Ten awards were presented prior to the full ceremony and broadcast on PBS. The awards presented were: Best Direction of a Play, Direction of a Musical, Book of a Musical, Original Score, Choreography, Costume Design, Lighting Design and Scenic Design. There were also interviews and "rehearsal and performance clips from the nominated shows."

The broadcast won the 2003 Primetime Emmy Award for Outstanding Directing for a Variety Series for Glenn Weiss.

== Eligibility ==
Shows that opened on Broadway during the 2001–02 season before May 2, 2002 are eligible.

Original plays

- An Almost Holy Picture
- Fortune’s Fool
- 45 Seconds from Broadway
- The Goat, or Who Is Sylvia?
- The Graduate
- If you ever leave me...I'm going with you!
- Metamorphoses
- The Mystery of Charles Dickens
- QED
- The Smell of the Kill
- Topdog/Underdog

Original musicals

- By Jeeves
- Mamma Mia!
- One Mo' Time
- Sweet Smell of Success
- Thoroughly Modern Millie
- Thou Shalt Not
- Urinetown

Play revivals

- A Christmas Carol
- The Crucible
- The Dance of Death
- The Elephant Man
- Hedda Gabler
- Major Barbara
- The Man Who Had All the Luck
- Morning's at Seven
- Noises Off
- Private Lives
- A Thousand Clowns
- The Women

Musical revivals

- Into the Woods
- Oklahoma!

== Winners and nominees ==
Winners are in bold

Best Play	Best Musical
**The Goat, or Who Is Sylvia? – Edward Albee**; Fortune's Fool – Mike Poulton; Metamorphoses – Mary Zimmerman; Topdog/Underdog – Suzan-Lori Parks	**Thoroughly Modern Millie**; Mamma Mia!; Sweet Smell of Success; Urinetown
Best Revival of a Play	Best Revival of a Musical
**Private Lives**; The Crucible; Morning's at Seven; Noises Off	**Into the Woods**; Oklahoma!
Best Performance by a Leading Actor in a Play	Best Performance by a Leading Actress in a Play
**Alan Bates – Fortune's Fool as Vassily Semyonitch Kuzovkin**; Billy Crudup – The Elephant Man as John Merrick; Liam Neeson – The Crucible as John Proctor; Alan Rickman – Private Lives as Elyot Chase; Jeffrey Wright – Topdog/Underdog as Lincoln	**Lindsay Duncan – Private Lives as Amanda Prynne**; Kate Burton – Hedda Gabler as Hedda Gabler; Laura Linney – The Crucible as Elizabeth Proctor; Helen Mirren – The Dance of Death as Alice; Mercedes Ruehl – The Goat, or Who Is Sylvia? as Stevie
Best Performance by a Leading Actor in a Musical	Best Performance by a Leading Actress in a Musical
**John Lithgow – Sweet Smell of Success as J.J. Hunsecker**; Gavin Creel – Thoroughly Modern Millie as Jimmy Smith; John McMartin – Into the Woods as Narrator/Mysterious Man; Patrick Wilson – Oklahoma! as Curly; John Cullum – Urinetown as Caldwell B. Cladwell	**Sutton Foster – Thoroughly Modern Millie as Millie Dillmount**; Louise Pitre – Mamma Mia! as Donna Sheridan; Vanessa L. Williams – Into the Woods as The Witch; Nancy Opel – Urinetown as Penelope Pennywise; Jennifer Laura Thompson – Urinetown as Hope Cladwell
Best Performance by a Featured Actor in a Play	Best Performance by a Featured Actress in a Play
**Frank Langella – Fortune's Fool as Flegont Alexandrovitch Tropatchov**; Brian Murray – The Crucible as Deputy-Governor Thomas Danforth; William Biff McGuire – Morning's at Seven as Theodore Swanson; Sam Robards – The Man Who Had All the Luck as Gustav Eberson; Stephen Tobolowsky – Morning's at Seven as Homer Bolton	**Katie Finneran – Noises Off as Brooke Ashton**; Kate Burton – The Elephant Man as Pinhead/Mrs. Kendal; Elizabeth Franz – Morning's at Seven as Aaronetta Gibbs; Estelle Parsons – Morning's at Seven as Cora Swanson; Frances Sternhagen – Morning's at Seven as Ida Bolton
Best Performance by a Featured Actor in a Musical	Best Performance by a Featured Actress in a Musical
**Shuler Hensley – Oklahoma! as Jud Fry**; Gregg Edelman – Into the Woods as The Wolf / Cinderella's Prince; Brian d'Arcy James – Sweet Smell of Success as Sidney Falco; Marc Kudisch – Thoroughly Modern Millie as Trevor Graydon; Norbert Leo Butz – Thou Shalt Not as Camille Raquin	**Harriet Sansom Harris – Thoroughly Modern Millie as Ms. Meers**; Andrea Martin – Oklahoma! as Aunt Eller; Judy Kaye – Mamma Mia! as Rosie Mulligan; Laura Benanti – Into the Woods as Cinderella; Spencer Kayden – Urinetown as Little Sally
Best Book of a Musical	Best Original Score (Music and/or Lyrics) Written for the Theatre
**Greg Kotis – Urinetown**; Catherine Johnson – Mamma Mia!; John Guare – Sweet Smell of Success; Richard Morris and Dick Scanlan – Thoroughly Modern Millie	**Urinetown – Mark Hollmann (music and lyrics) and Greg Kotis (lyrics)**; Sweet Smell of Success – Marvin Hamlisch (music) and Craig Carnelia (lyrics); Thoroughly Modern Millie – Jeanine Tesori (music) and Dick Scanlan (lyrics); Thou Shalt Not – Harry Connick, Jr. (music and lyrics)
Best Scenic Design	Best Costume Design
**Tim Hatley – Private Lives**; Daniel Ostling – Metamorphoses; Douglas W. Schmidt – Into the Woods; John Lee Beatty – Morning's at Seven	**Martin Pakledinaz – Thoroughly Modern Millie**; Jenny Beavan – Private Lives; Susan Hilferty – Into the Woods; Jane Greenwood – Morning's at Seven
Best Lighting Design	Best Orchestrations
**Brian MacDevitt – Into the Woods**; David Hersey – Oklahoma!; Natasha Katz – Sweet Smell of Success; Paul Gallo – The Crucible	**Doug Besterman and Ralph Burns– Thoroughly Modern Millie**; Benny Andersson, Björn Ulvaeus and Martin Koch – Mamma Mia!; William David Brohn – Sweet Smell of Success; Bruce Coughlin – Urinetown
Best Direction of a Play	Best Direction of a Musical
**Mary Zimmerman – Metamorphoses**; Howard Davies – Private Lives; Richard Eyre – The Crucible; Daniel Sullivan – Morning's at Seven	**John Rando – Urinetown**; James Lapine – Into the Woods; Michael Mayer – Thoroughly Modern Millie; Trevor Nunn – Oklahoma!
Best Choreography	Best Special Theatrical Event
**Rob Ashford – Thoroughly Modern Millie**; John Carrafa – Urinetown; John Carrafa – Into the Woods; Susan Stroman – Oklahoma!	**Elaine Stritch at Liberty**; Bea Arthur on Broadway; Barbara Cook in Mostly Sondheim; Sexaholix.. A Love Story

== Special awards ==
Source: TheaterMania

- Regional Theatre Tony Award
  - Williamstown Theatre Festival
- Special Tony Award for Lifetime Achievement in the Theatre
  - Robert Whitehead
- Special Tony Award for Lifetime Achievement in the Theatre
  - Julie Harris

== Multiple nominations and awards ==
These productions had multiple nominations:

- 11 nominations: Thoroughly Modern Millie
- 10 nominations: Into the Woods and Urinetown
- 9 nominations: Morning's at Seven
- 7 nominations: Oklahoma! and Sweet Smell of Success
- 6 nominations: The Crucible and Private Lives
- 5 nominations: Mamma Mia!
- 3 nominations: Fortune's Fool and Metamorphoses
- 2 nominations: The Elephant Man, The Goat, or Who Is Sylvia?, Noises Off, Thou Shalt Not and Topdog/Underdog

The following productions received multiple awards.

- 6 wins: Thoroughly Modern Millie
- 3 wins: Private Lives and Urinetown
- 2 wins: Fortune's Fool and Into the Woods

== See also ==
- Drama Desk Awards
- 2002 Laurence Olivier Awards – equivalent awards for West End theatre productions
- Obie Award
- New York Drama Critics' Circle
- Theatre World Award
- Lucille Lortel Awards
