= The Contemporary Theater Company =

Non-profit theater company in South Kingstown, Rhode Island, United States

Coordinates: 41.438896°N 71.499068°W

The Contemporary Theater Company (CTC) is a 501(c)3 non-profit theater company based in South Kingstown, Rhode Island. Founded by Artistic Director Christopher J. Simpson in 2005, the company presents a range of plays throughout South County with an emphasis on reaching first-time theatergoers. The company presents an annual holiday show at the historic waterfront Towers in Narragansett and produces an annual 24-Hour Play Festival at the South Kingstown High School. The company presents theater, classes and public events at a theater at 327 Main Street in historic downtown Wakefield that opened in July 2012.

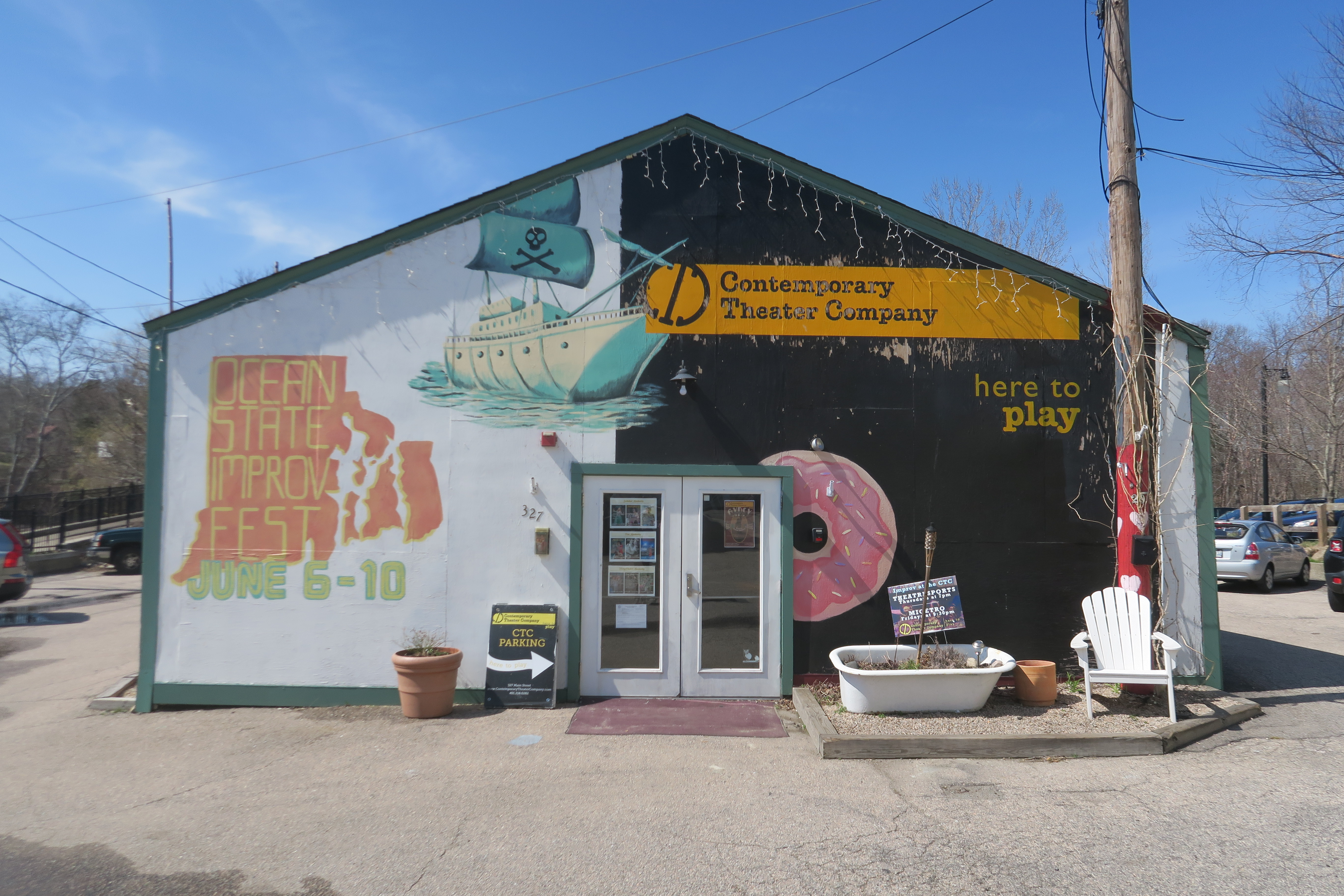
Contemporary Theater Company

== History ==
The Contemporary Theater Company started as an unincorporated group in 2005 known as The Courthouse Summer Theater Company. Its first production was Rumors by Neil Simon in the summer of 2005. The company incorporated on May 30, 2006. The company continued to present shows under the name The Courthouse Theater Company at the Courthouse Center for the Arts until the end of 2007, when the center established an in-house theater group.

In 2009, The Courthouse Theater Company renamed itself The Contemporary Theater Company. It has since produced shows including The Complete Works of William Shakespeare (Abridged) and The Gift of the Magi.

In 2012, the company moved to its current location. It purchased an adjacent property to use as a rehearsal space and patio and in 2018 purchased its main theatre space. An additional renovation and expansion followed.

In January 2021, associate artistic director Tammy Brown was promoted to artistic director, tasked with developing a five-year plan for the organization and an expanded mission and vision. She resigned in July, 2024.

== Past Seasons ==
=== 2015 season ===
- 10th Annual 24 Hour Play Festival
- Springboard Season
- Golda's Balcony by William Gibson
- Lysistrata by Meg Perry
- One-Hour Theatre Challenge
- Black Comedy by Peter Shaffer
- Buyer and Cellar by Jonathan Tolins
- Testing Testing 1234 with the South Kingstown High School Drama Club
- Sweeney Todd by Stephen Sondheim
- Planet Christmas by Andy Hoover
- 2nd Annual Christmas Cocktail Cabaret

=== 2014 season ===
- 9th Annual 24 Hour Play Festival
- Springboard Season
- Cloud 9 by Caryl Churchill
- The Rescue by Ron Maine
- Noises Off by Michael Frayn
- Art by Yasmina Reza
- Testing Testing 1234 with the South Kingstown High School Drama Club
- The Visit by Friedrich Dürrenmatt
- Mrs. Bob Crachit's Wild Christmas Binge by Christopher Durang
- 1st Annual Christmas Cocktail Cabaret

=== 2013 season ===
- 8th Annual 24 Hour Play Festival
- Springboard Season
- God's Ear by Jenny Schwartz
- Fuddy Meers by David Lindsay-Abaire
- A Flea in Her Ear by Georges Feydeau, translated by David Ives
- Bob by Peter Sinn Nachtrieb
- Testing Testing 1234 with the South Kingstown High School Drama Club
- Assassins (musical) by Stephen Sondheim
- The Gift of the Magi by Spencer Curry

=== 2012 season ===
- 7th Annual 24 Hour Play Festival
- Your Friends and Neighbors Present: Paradise Park by Charles Mee
- Is He Dead? by Mark Twain
- The Foreigner by Larry Shue
- The Cmpleat Wrks of Wllm Shkspr (abridged) by The Reduced Shakespeare Company
- Testing Testing 1234 with the South Kingstown High School Drama Club
- The Tempest by William Shakespeare
- Willy Wonka and the Chocolate Factory by Roald Dahl – in partnership with GEAR productions
- The Gift of the Magi by Andy Hoover

=== 2011 season ===
- 6th Annual 24 Hour Play Festival
- Romeo and Juliet by William Shakespeare
- Composition by Andy Hoover
- 30 Neofuturist Plays from Too Much Light Makes the Baby Go Blind by The Neofuturists
- Red Herring by Michael Hollinger
- Peter Pan by Shawn Fennell
- Testing Testing 1234 with the South Kingstown High School Drama Club
- Eurydice by Sarah Ruhl
- Mrs. Bob Cratchit's Wild Christmas Binge by Christopher Durang

=== 2010 season ===
- 5th Annual 24 Hour Play Festival
- The Last Five Years by Jason Robert Brown
- The Real Inspector Hound by Tom Stoppard
- The Glass Menagerie by Tennessee Williams
- Waiting for Godot by Samuel Beckett
- Rumors by Neil Simon
- Alice's Adventures in Wonderland by Lewis Carroll – in partnership with GEAR Productions
- The Gift of the Magi by Andy Hoover

=== 2009 season ===
- 4th Annual 24 Hour Play Festival
- The Complete Works of William Shakespeare by The Reduced Shakespeare Company
- Noises Off by Michael Frayn
- Arsenic and Old Lace by Joseph Kesselring
- Metamorphoses by Mary Zimmerman
- The Gift of the Magi by Andy Hoover

=== 2008 season ===
- 3rd Annual 24 Hour Play Festival
- Color Theory – an original production
- 30 Neofuturist Plays from Too Much Light Makes the Baby Go Blind by The Neofuturists

=== 2007 season ===
- 2nd Annual 24 Hour Play Festival
- The Matchmaker by Thornton Wilder
- Set & Drift by Andy Hoover

=== 2006 season ===
- 24 Hour Play Festival
- Proof by David Auburn
- You Can't Take It with You by George S. Kaufman and Moss Hart

=== 2005 season ===
- Rumors by Neil Simon

== Awards and nominations ==
"Rhode Island Monthly Editor's Pick" 2012 Arts Revitalization Award

Providence Phoenix: The Best of RI 2011

Best Theater Company (won)

MoreTeeth's Most Teeth Theater Awards May 2010 – May 2011

Best Play (Drama): Romeo and Juliet (nominated)

Waiting for Godot (nominated)

Best Director: Ryan Hartigan, Waiting for Godot (won)

Amy Lee Connell, Shawn Fennell, Nevan Michael Richard & Christopher J. Simpson, Romeo and Juliet (nominated)

Best Dramatic Performance (Female): Amy Lee Connell, Romeo and Juliet (nominated)
Best Dramatic Performance (Male): Stephen Strenio, Waiting for Godot (won)
Best Supporting Dramatic Performance (Female): Amy Lee Connell, Romeo and Juliet (nominated)
Best Supporting Dramatic Performance (Male): Maxwell Matthews, Waiting for Godot (nominated)

2011 Motif Magazine Theatre Awards

Best Supporting Male: Christopher J. Simpson, Waiting for Godot (won)

Southern Rhode Island Chamber of Commerce's 2011 Chamber Impact Awards

Excellence in Innovation Award (won)

Providence Phoenix: The Best of RI 2010

Best New & Yummy Theater Troupe (won)

2009 Motif Magazine Theatre Awards

Best Supporting Female: Meghan Rose Donnelly, Noises Off (nominated)

== Organization ==
The CTC is led by an eleven-member board of directors and Artistic Director Christopher J. Simpson. In 2009, Simpson won a fellowship from Princeton University to help grow the company.
