= The Wikipedia Plays =

The Wikipedia Plays, first performed in August 2007, is a performance comprising seventeen plays, each ten minutes long, by the Off-Broadway New York theatre company Ars Nova. The play was created and staged by the company's then associate producer, Kim Rosenstock. Each is based on the title of an entry in Wikipedia: Rosenstock selected these by following wikilinks from one article to another.

The complete sequence runs: "The Defenestration of Prague" → "Bohemia" → "Prokop the Great" → "Democracy" → "Yale Law School" → "Bill Clinton" → "Global Warming" → "Uncertainties" (see Uncertainty) → "Weather Forecasting" → "Troposphere" → "Turbulent" (see Turbulence) → "Golf Ball" → "Wooden" (see Wood) → "Particle Board" → "Stiletto Heels" → "Fetish" → "Castration Anxiety."

The play has been seen as belonging to a movement in contemporary theatre favouring long performances of sequential short plays, being compared with the Neo-Futurists' Too Much Light Makes the Baby Go Blind (1988), the work of the Reduced Shakespeare Company, and 365 Days/365 Plays by Suzan-Lori Parks (2006).
