= Yeast Nation =

2007 musical by Mark Hollmann and Greg Kotis

Yeast Nation (The Triumph of Life)
- Promotional image for the 2014 production
- Music: Mark Hollmann
- Lyrics: Mark Hollmann; Greg Kotis
- Book: Greg Kotis
- Premiere: October 5, 2007: Perseverance Theatre, Juneau, Alaska, United States

Yeast Nation (The Triumph of Life) is a musical that premiered in 2007, with music by Mark Hollmann, lyrics by Hollmann and Greg Kotis, and book by Kotis. It serves as the first part of a musical trilogy, with the middle installment being Hollmann and Kotis' previous Tony Award-winning musical Urinetown and the final installment being Welcome to Space.

== Productions ==
Yeast Nation had its debut run from October 5 to November 3, 2007 at the Perseverance Theatre in Juneau, Alaska, under the direction of PJ Paparelli. The musical was next produced in 2009 by the American Theater Company in Chicago, again under the direction of Paparelli.

It was then part of the 2011 New York International Fringe Festival, where it was awarded the FringeNYC Overall Excellence Award for overall production of a musical. The cast included Harriet Harris (as Jan-the-Unnamed), Kimiko Glenn (as The New One), Manu Narayan (as Jan-the-Wise), Joy Suprano (as Jan-the-Sly), and Rick Crom (as Jan-the-Youngest). The musical has since been staged by Ray of Light Theatre in San Francisco in 2014, and New Line Theatre in St. Louis in June 2018.

The European premiere was staged at Southwark Playhouse, London from July 22, 2022 to August 27,2022.

== History ==
Hollmann and Kotis had publicly discussed their efforts in working on a Urinetown sequel or prequel as early as 2004. A private industry reading of an early draft of the show was performed at the Manhattan Theatre Club in New York City on October 21, 2005. Urinetown alums Hunter Foster and Nancy Opel were among the cast, and the private performance was directed by John Rando.

== Characters ==
- Jan-the-Elder
- Jan-the-Second-Oldest
- Jan-the-Famished
- Jan-the-Sly
- Jan-the-Sweet
- Jan-the-Unnamed
- Jan-the-Wise
- Jan-the-Wretched
- Jan-the-Youngest
- The New One

== Musical numbers ==
Act I

- Hear the Song – Jan-the-Unnamed and Company
- You Are My Children - Jan-the-Elder and Company
- Burnin’ Soul - Jan-the-Sweet and Jan-the-Second-Oldest
- I'll Change the World Around Her - Jan-the-Second-Oldest
- Little Sister - Jan-the-Sly and Jan-the-Famished
- Alone - Jan-the-Elder, Jan-the-Wise, Jan-the-Second-Oldest, and Jan-the-Sweet
- Let Us Rise - Jan-the-Second-Oldest and Jan-the-Sweet
- Stasis is the Membrane - Jan-the-Sly, Jan-the-Famished, Jan-the-Wise, and Company
- Liar - Jan-the-Wise and Jan-the-Sweet
- Act I Finale - Company

Act II

- You Don't Know a Thing About Love - Jan-the-Unnamed and Company
- Me Good - The New One, Jan-the-Elder, and Company
- Don't Be a Traitor to Love - Jan-the-Sly and Jan-the-Wise
- You're Not the Yeast You Used to Be - Jan-the-Second-Oldest and Jan-the-Sweet
- Love Equals Pain - Jan-the-Unnamed, Jan-the-Sweet, and Chorus
- Let Us Rise Reprise - Jan-the-Elder and The New One
- Doom! Love! Doom! - Jan-the-Elder and Company
- Look at What Love Made Me Do - Company
- Life Goes On - Jan-the-Wise, Jan-the-Sweet, and Jan-the-Second-Oldest
- The World Won't Wait - Jan-the-Sweet, Jan-the-Second-Oldest, Jan-the-Unnamed, and Company

== Reception ==
Variety gave a positive review to the 2009 Chicago production, saying that Hollmann and Kotis "toy with storytelling cliches to make them both function dramatically and seem fresh." The New York Times wrote of the 2011 Fringe Festival production that "The jokes veer from broad to brainy, and Mark Hollmann’s music is rock pastiche, but this is the rare satire that knows precisely what it’s sending up and commits to it." TalkinBroadway.com said of the 2014 San Francisco production that "the concept, execution, cast and design are all well done," but that the show "still looks like a work in progress."
