= Ayun Halliday =

American writer

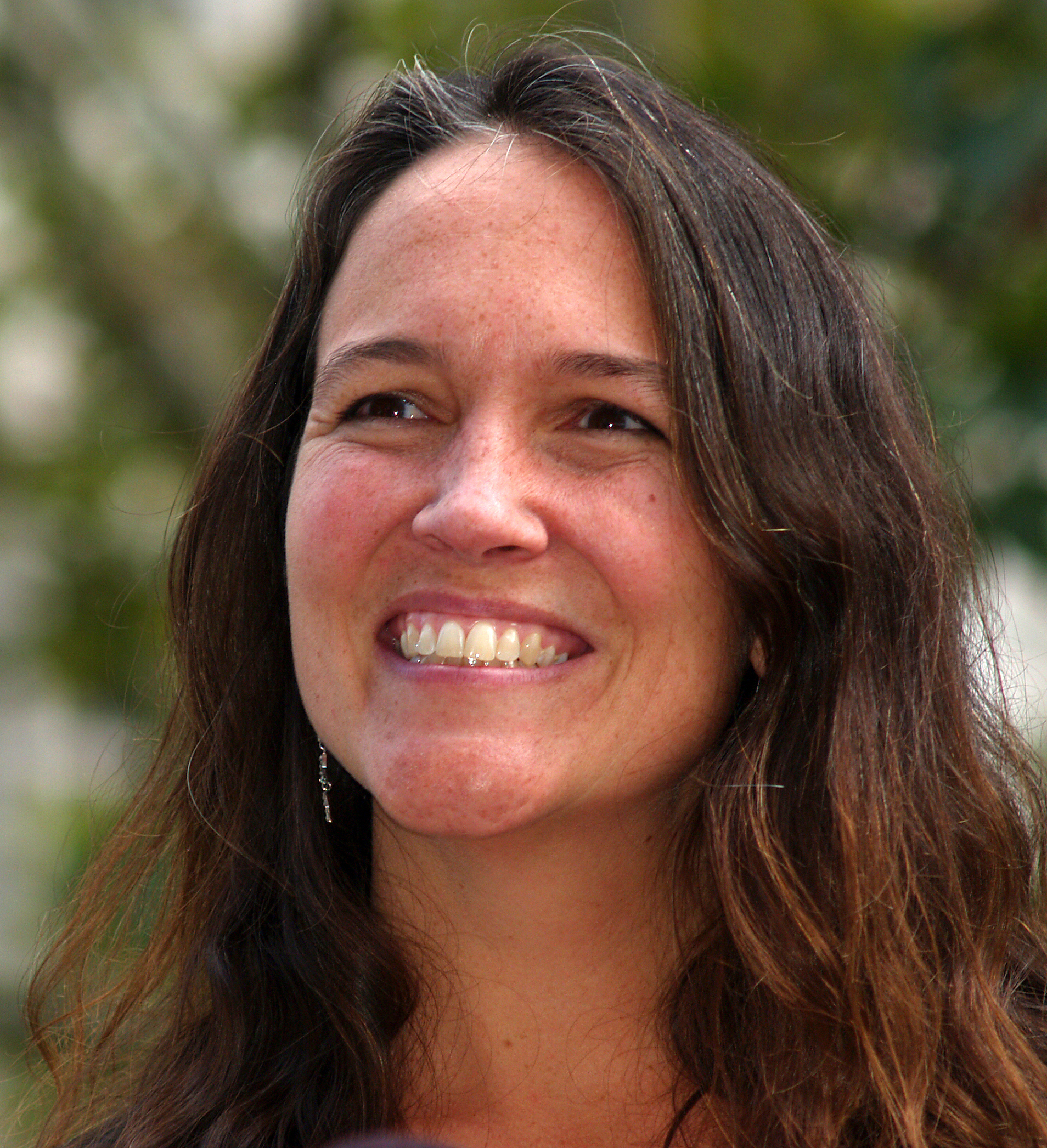
- Born: March 29, 1965 (age 61); Indianapolis, Indiana, U.S.
- Education: Park Tudor School; Northwestern University
- Occupations: Writer and actor
- Spouse: Greg Kotis (m. 1995)
- Partner: Stephen Colbert (1986–1990)
- Children: 2
- Writing career
- Genres: Zines, graphic novels, memoirs, plays, travel literature
- Website: www.ayunhalliday.com

Ayun Halliday is an American writer and actor.

She is best known as the author and illustrator (or, as Halliday herself terms it, "the chief primatologist") of the long-running zine The East Village Inky. The zine got its name from Halliday's living in New York City's East Village, and "Inky" being the nickname of her then-infant daughter India.

Her first graphic novel, Peanut, was published in December 2012 and was positively reviewed by The New York Times.

== Early life ==
Halliday was born in Indianapolis, Indiana. She attended Park Tudor School and Northwestern University, where she obtained a degree in theater performance. She is also a licensed massage therapist, who completed her training at the Chicago School of Massage Therapy. After graduating, she joined the Neo-Futurists, an experimental theater troupe in Chicago. It was during her tenure with the troupe that she met her husband, playwright Greg Kotis.

== Personal life ==
She lives in East Harlem, New York. She and Kotis have two children: India (born 1997) and Milo (born 2000).

Halliday and Kotis are co-founders of Theater of the Apes.

Halliday created and hosts Necromancers of the Public Domain, a monthly performance series in New York City, wherein a dusty book from the New York Society Library is turned in a low budget variety show.

== Published books ==
- The Big Rumpus (published in the UK as Mama Lama Ding Dong) (2002)
- No Touch Monkey! And Other Travel Lessons Learned Too Late (2003)
- Job Hopper (2005)
- Dirty Sugar Cookies: Culinary Observations, Questionable Taste (2006)
- Always Lots of Heinies at the Zoo (2009)
- The Zinester's Guide to NYC (2010)
- Peanut (2012)
- Creative, Not Famous: The Small Potato Manifesto (2022)
- Creative, Not Famous Activity Book (2023)
- Panther City: Tales of a Gen X Grade 3 Class Project Run Amok (2025)

== Plays ==
- Farang (1992)
- Bagel: Anatomy as Simile (1994)
- Too Much Light Makes the Baby Go Blind (1989-1998)
- The Mermaid's Legs (2014)
- Fawnbook (2015)
- Zamboni Godot (2017)
- Nurse! (2018)
