= Joakim Sundström =

Swedish Sound Designer (born 1965)

Joakim Sundström is a Swedish supervising sound editor, sound designer and musician.

Sundström was born on February 27, 1965, in the Baltic city of Gävle in Sweden and brought up in Buchanan, Liberia on the West African Atlantic coast. He collaborates regularly with British-Irish playwright and filmmaker Martin McDonagh, English filmmaker Andrew Haigh and with English film director Michael Winterbottom. Married to British painter Dee Ferris. They have a daughter, Tova Sundström, and a son, Ruben Sundström. He currently resides between London and Brighton, England.

== Filmography ==
- Robinson in Space (1997)
- Dance of the Wind (1997)
- Souvenir (1998)
- Simon Magus (1999)
- I Could Read the Sky (1999)
- My Kingdom (2001)
- In This World (2002)
- Heartlands (2002)
- 24 Hour Party People (2002)
- Octane (2003)
- Code 46 (2003)
- Touching the Void (2003)
- Birth (2004)
- 9 Songs (2004)
- Yes (2004)
- Enduring Love (2004)
- Isolation (2005)
- MirrorMask (2005)
- The Piano Tuner of Earthquakes (2005)
- A Cock and Bull Story (2005)
- Wilderness (2006)
- Song of Songs (2006)
- The Road to Guantánamo (2006)
- The Constant Gardener (2006)
- Scott Walker: 30 Century Man (2006)
- The History Boys (2006)
- Deep Water (2006)
- Becoming Jane (2007)
- A Mighty Heart (2007)
- Sleep Furiously (2008)
- Genova (2008)
- Cheri (2008)
- Fish Tank (2009)
- Skeletons (2010)
- The Killer Inside Me (2010)
- Tamara Drewe (2010)
- Men Who Swim (2010)
- The Trip (2010)
- Sønner av Norge (2011)
- Trishna (2011)
- Welcome to the Punch (2012)
- Lay the Favorite (2012)
- Berberian Sound Studio (2012)
- Seven Psychopaths (2012)
- The Look of Love (2013)
- Three Billboards Outside Ebbing, Missouri (2017)
- Ray & Liz (2018)

== TV productions ==
- Cheek to Cheek (1997)
- The Sandman (2000)
- Barnen på Luna (2000)
- Herr von Hancken (2000)
- Bekännelsen (2001)
- Återkomsten (2001)
- Tracker (2001)
- Andrew and Jeremy Get Married (2004)
- Top Spot (2004)
- A Time Comes (2004)
- The Trip (2010)
- The Trip to Italy (2010)
- The Marriage of Reason & Squalor (2015)

== Selected awards & nominations ==
- 2003 – British Independent Film Awards – nominated
- 2005 – MPSE Golden Reel Awards – nominated
- 2005 – The International Press Academy Satellite Awards – nominated
- 2006 – MPSE Golden Reel Awards – nominated
- 2006 – British Academy Film Awards – nominated
- 2012 – British Independent Film Awards – won
- 2012 – London Film Critics' Circle – nominated
