= Relatively Speaking (Ayckbourn play) =

1965 play written by Alan Ayckbourn

- Original language: English
- Written by: Alan Ayckbourn
- Characters: Greg; Ginny; Philip; Sheila
- Subject: Love, infidelity, misunderstandings, mistaken identity
- Setting: The bed-sitting-room of Ginny's London flat and on the garden patio of Sheila and Philip's home in Buckinghamshire, 1965.

Premiere
- Date: 1965
- Official website

Relatively Speaking is a 1965 play by British playwright Alan Ayckbourn, originally titled Meet My Father, his first major success.

== Setting ==
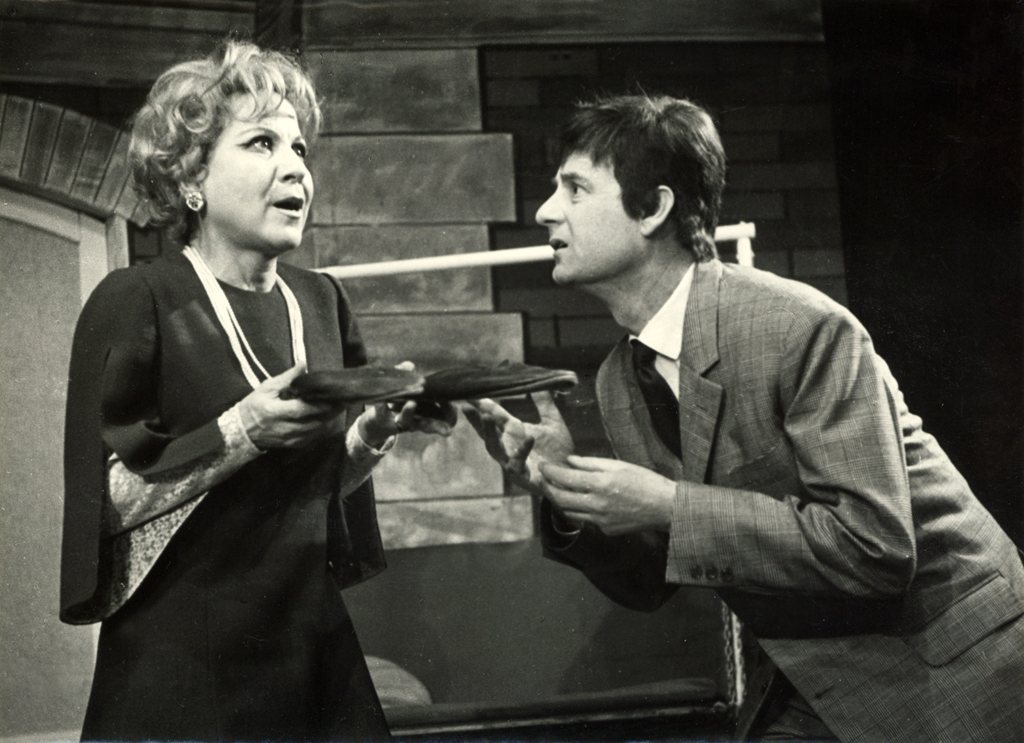
The play by the Ljubljana City Theatre in 1969

The action of the play takes place during a summer weekend in the bed-sitting-room of Ginny's London flat and on the garden patio of Sheila and Philip's home in Buckinghamshire, outside London. The time is 1965.

== Characters ==
- Ginny – A young woman with a chequered past
- Greg – Ginny's current boyfriend
- Philip – Ginny's former employer and ex-lover
- Sheila – Philip's wife

== Synopsis ==
The play opens in the flat of Greg and Ginny, a young co-habiting couple, Ginny being the more sexually experienced. Greg finds a strange pair of slippers under the bed and is too besotted to believe they might have been left by another man (which would also explain the bunches of flowers and boxes of sweets filling Ginny's apartment). Ginny goes off for a day in the country, supposedly to visit her parents but actually to break things off with her older married lover, Philip. Greg decides to follow her.

The next scene is on the patio at the home of Philip and his befuddled wife Sheila, whose marriage is clearly under strain. Greg shows up unannounced before Ginny, and wrongly assumes that they are her parents. Greg asks for her hand from Philip, while Philip mistakenly believes that the strange young man is asking permission to marry Sheila. Once Ginny arrives, she convinces Philip to play the role of her father. Meanwhile, Greg still believes that Sheila is Ginny's mother. The situation becomes increasingly complicated and hilarious.

Although it is basically a comedy of misunderstandings and mistaken identity, as plays of this genre go it has a very well-constructed plot, plus some developed characters and a slightly dark streak.

== Production history ==
Relatively Speaking had its world premiere in Scarborough, North Yorkshire, in 1965. The London production in 1967 at the Duke of York's Theatre was Ayckbourn's first London West End hit. It also helped to further Richard Briers' career, and featured Michael Hordern and Celia Johnson. It has since been staged a few times by professional and amateur companies, and in 2013 a revival ran for three months at Wyndham's Theatre in London, starring Felicity Kendal as Sheila.

The 40th-anniversary production was directed by Alan Ayckbourn at the Stephen Joseph Theatre in Scarborough in 2007, starring Philip York, Eileen Battye, Dominic Hecht and Katie Foster-Barnes.

The play has also been produced internationally, in Singapore, Kuala Lumpur, Sri Lanka, in May 2007, by the British Theatre Playhouse, and in November 2018 in Belgrade, Serbia. In October 2020, the Fylde Coast Players were the only amateur dramatics company able to put on a performance of any production in the UK (after the first lockdown in March). Director Rosie Withers chose to put on Relatively Speaking and performed using two actual couples in order to facilitate performing on stage without breaking COVID-19 guidelines.
