= Top Spot =

2004 film by Tracey Emin

- Directed by: Tracey Emin
- Written by: Tracey Emin
- Produced by: Melissa Parmenter
- Starring: Elizabeth Crawford; Laura Curnick; Katie Foster Barnes; Frances Williams; Kieri Kennedy; Helen Laker
- Edited by: Sebastian Sharples
- Production companies: BBC Films; Revolution Films
- Distributed by: Tartan Films
- Release dates: 22 October 2004 (BFI London); 3 December 2004 (UK)
- Running time: 63 minutes
- Country: United Kingdom
- Language: English

Top Spot is a 2004 docudrama film written and directed by Tracey Emin. It was produced by Michael Winterbottom and Revolution Films. It stars Elizabeth Crawford, Laura Curnick, Katie Foster Barnes, Frances Williams, Kieri Kennedy, and Helen Laker. Shot on digital video and Super 8, the film focuses on a group of teenage girls in the coastal English town of Margate, Emin's hometown. The plot does not follow a traditional narrative and is instead a blend of montage and recreated incidents inspired from Emin's youth. The dialogue was improvised. The title Top Spot takes its name from a Margate disco, and is also used as an explicit slang word colloquially.

Top Spot premiered at the London Film Festival on 22 October 2004. Because of a scene depicting a suicide technique, the film was given an 18 certificate by the British Board of Film Classification, which Emin decried as she had intended the film to be seen by teenage audiences. Emin then withdrew the film from general distribution in cinemas. It was broadcast on BBC3 television in the UK in December 2004. A DVD of the film was released in 2006 by Tartan Films.

== Synopsis ==
The film has been described as "somewhere between documentary and poetry, narrative cinema and art installation". It opens with Emin's voiceover about a local nightclub in Margate called Top Spot. She says of the club, "We'd snog and kiss, be fingered, titted up." She also notes that the term "top spot" is slang for the sensation a man feels when his penis reaches a woman's cervix during penetrative sex. The film comes to focus on six young Margate women (only a few are named) who are interviewed on camera about their traumatic sexual experiences. One girl is a victim of incest, while another says she was raped in an alley. A third girl claims she does not care if she is considered the town slag. One girl, Helen, is a romantic who has become smitten with a boy that she kissed at Dreamland and who has since joined the French Foreign Legion; she intends to reunite with him. The young women help support each other amidst the highs and lows of being a teenage girl.

== Critical reception ==
The film was critiqued for its technical aspects and "shapeless" format. Leslie Felperin of Variety criticized the film as "meandering and inconsequential", adding that the "jittery camerawork and poor sound recording contribute to overall inept, student film ambience". Critics also questioned Emin's decision to feature herself in the film. In a more positive review, Sheila Johnston of the Evening Standard wrote, "For all their problems, the girls also display a tremendous humour, swagger and resilience". In Artforum, Jonathan Romney said Top Spot can be "best described as a digitally shot scrapbook of moving seaside postcards, memories, and fleeting fantasies. Narratively it owes much to the British tradition of the female coming-of-age film, most notably to David Leland's Wish You Were Here (1987), about a sexually precocious seaside rebel".
