= Little Fish (musical) =

- Music: Michael John LaChiusa
- Lyrics: Michael John LaChiusa
- Book: Michael John LaChiusa
- Basis: Days by Deborah Eisenberg; Flotsam by Deborah Eisenberg
- Productions: 2003 Off-Broadway; 2007 California; 2009 London

Little Fish is a musical with music, lyrics, and book by Michael John LaChiusa. The musical is suggested by two short stories by Deborah Eisenberg, Days and Flotsam. It concerns a group of friends living in New York City, one of whom, Charlotte, decides to stop smoking and then swims to compensate for the lack of nicotine. LaChiusa has said that he sees Little Fish as a "parable of sorts" for New York after the September 11 attacks.

== Production history ==
The musical premiered off-Broadway at the Second Stage Theatre in New York City on February 13, 2003, and closed on March 9, 2003. Directed and choreographed by Graciela Daniele, it starred Jennifer Laura Thompson in the lead role of Charlotte and featured Hugh Panaro as Robert, Lea DeLaria as Cinder, and Jesse Tyler Ferguson as Marco. During the run educational workshops were run by Tracy Bersley.

Alice Ripley starred, with Gregory Jbara and Chad Kimball, in a production running from October 9, 2007, to November 18, 2007, at The Blank Theatre, Hollywood, California.

The European premiere was at the Finborough Theatre, London, from October 27, 2009, through November 21. The production was produced by JQ Productions and directed by Adam Lenson, with the cast featuring Ashley Campbell, Michael Cantwell, Katie Foster-Barnes, Nick Holder, Alana Maria, Laura Pitt-Pulford, Lee William-Davis and Julia Worsley.

== Synopsis ==
In the present time, Charlotte, in her early 30s, lives in New York and is a short-story writer. She has given up smoking cigarettes, but without them she sees herself clearly, and believes that it is not an attractive picture. She is frightened by her new-found reality, thus her friends Marco and Kathy suggest various activities, such as collecting dolls or a new drug. However, she opts for what is presumably the least silly; swimming.

Charlotte thinks back to 1993, when she lived in Buffalo with her lover Robert, in his 40s, and she studied English Literature with him. She reflects on her childhood heroine, Anne Frank, who warns her about flotsam: emotional "debris" that blocks the flow of life. As Charlotte sees that she has been addicted not only to cigarettes but "fleeing", she is able to connect with her friends and her writing.

=== Concept ===
Don Shewey noted that the musical "departs from any kind of traditional book musical structure. Charlotte's tale emerges in vignettes that flicker and flash, zooming back and forth in time, held together by a narrative thread as tenuous as her nonsmoking sanity." Further, the music is "eclectic" and includes "Latin, jazz, rock, there's pure urban noise."

== Songs ==
- "Days" - Charlotte, Company
- "Robert" - Charlotte
- "It's A Sign" - Cinder
- "The Pool (Part 1)" - Charlotte, Company
- "Lockerroom (Part 1)"
- "Winter Is Here/The Pool (Part 2)" - Charlotte
- "Short Story" - Robert, Lifeguards
- "Perfect" - Kathy
- "John Paul/Disco" - Charlotte, Kathy
- "He" - Robert, Men
- "Cigarette Dream" - Charlotte, Company
- "Flotsam" - Anne
- "Lockerroom 2"
- "I Ran" - Marco
- "The Track (Part 1)"
- "Mr. Bunder/By The Way" - Mr. Bunder
- "Remember Me" - Kathy
- "Anne" - Young Girl
- "Little Fish" - Marco
- "Poor Charlotte" - Cinder
- "The Track (Part 2)"
- "Flotsam" Reprise
- "Simple Creature" - Charlotte
- "Gallery/Perfect" Reprise
- "In Two's and Three's" - Charlotte, Company

== Response ==
Both Daniele and LaChiusa said Charlotte's struggle to quit smoking is "a metaphor for the crises that force people to reconsider who they are and what is important." Mr. LaChiusa said the musical was his oblique response to September 11: "After that happened, nobody was thinking about how to get rich and famous. You wanted to be around the people you love." LaChiusa went on to add that "But after you've been here in [New York] a while, you realize that you don't always have to swim upstream and battle the elements. When you're a little fish in a big pond, it's safer to swim in schools."

Ben Brantley, reviewing for The New York Times, wrote: "About halfway into its intermissionless 90 minutes, Little Fish starts to lose its shapely, sharp-edged contours and turn into a sentimental, well, blob... Mr. LaChiusa...and Ms. Daniele has done a swell job of fashioning a lively musical about what it means to feel lifeless in contemporary Manhattan...Like many American musical composers under 50, Mr. LaChiusa is an artistic descendant of Mr. Sondheim, and in many ways, Little Fish can be regarded as a direct, latter-day answer to Company. Certainly, Riccardo Hernández's terraced, silver-toned set, with its evocation of concrete canyons enhanced by Peggy Eisenhauer's shifting lighting, brings to mind Boris Aronson's fabled designs for the original Company. And Mr. LaChiusa's Charlotte, like Mr. Sondheim's Bobby, is a wistful, disengaged soul who is surrounded by people who advise her on how to live... The problem, as the show goes on, is that there's an inevitable monotony to Charlotte's interior life."

The Talkin' Broadway review noted: "It hits all its marks well, but never has quite the "oomph" needed to put it over the top. This may be due to Graciela Daniele's direction and choreography which are fine but unexceptional, never completely communicating in the same urban language that drips from every LaChiusa's score and libretto... LaChiusa can and does impress, time and time again, though perhaps never more effectively than in Charlotte's late-show song, "Simple Creature." It's one of the most stirring and artfully constructed musical scenes to hit the New York stage in years."

== Recordings ==
The cast recording of the Blank Theatre Company's production was released on the Ghostlight Records label on September 9, 2008. with Alice Ripley as Charlotte, Chad Kimball as Marco, Gregory Jbara as Mr. Bunder, Robert Torti as Robert and Samantha Shelton as Cinder.
