= Jackson Bird (author) =

American author, vlogger, and LGBTQ advocate

- Born: 4 May 1990 (age 35)
- Occupations: vlogger, writer
- Years active: 2010-present
- Known for: Sorted: Growing Up, Coming Out, and Finding My Place (A Transgender Memoir)

YouTube information
- Channel: Jackson Bird
- Genre: LGBTQ+ content
- Subscribers: 92.1 thousand
- Views: 7.3 million
- Last updated: 5 January 2025

Jackson Bird is an American vlogger, speaker, LGBTQ advocate, and writer. He is the author of the 2020 memoir Sorted: Growing Up, Coming Out, and Finding My Place (A Transgender Memoir).

== Early childhood and education ==
Bird grew up in Texas in the 1990s. Bird attended Southwestern University for two years before transferring to and ultimately graduating from New York University.

== Career ==
=== Harry Potter fandom ===
While in college, Bird began volunteering for the Harry Potter Alliance, a nonprofit that mobilizes fans of the Harry Potter series to engage in activism and philanthropy. This ultimately led to a paid job as communications director with the organization, a job he held for five years. When Bird came out as transgender at age 25, he said the Harry Potter fan community supported him, having learned from the books "about being yourself, loving those who are different from you and sticking up for the underdog."

=== YouTube creator ===
In 2010, Bird launched a YouTube channel. One recurring feature of the channel is a series of videos called "Will it waffle?" in which Bird puts various foods into a waffle iron to see what will happen. In 2015, Bird made a video in which he came out as transgender. Since that time, he has continued to make videos documenting his transition. As of May 2021, Bird's YouTube channel had more than 86,000 subscribers and its videos had been viewed more than 6 million times.

=== Author ===
Bird's memoir Sorted: Growing Up, Coming Out, and Finding My Place (A Transgender Memoir) was released by Tiller Press, an imprint of Simon & Schuster, on September 24, 2019. Publishers Weekly praised Bird's "sense of humor and lightness of touch," saying the book would "appeal to younger readers bogged down by the doom-and-gloom heaviness that can cloud the trans experience."

=== LGBTQ+ activism ===
Bird has been featured on a segment of PBS NewsHour's series Brief But Spectacular, where he explained what it means to be transgender and spoke about how to support transgender people. In 2017 he gave a TED Talk called "How to talk and listen to transgender people", which as of May 2021 had been viewed by more than 1.7 million people.

=== Theater ===
Bird joined the New York Neo-Futurists in 2022, and is part of the regular performing ensemble for their late night show The Infinite Wrench.

== Awards and fellowships ==
In the spring of 2017, Bird was chosen as one of 21 residents to spend 14 weeks collaborating and creating ideas at TED headquarters, which led to his TED talk that same year. GLAAD awarded Bird with a Rising Stars Grant for digital innovation in 2018. In 2020, Bird was selected as a fellow at the University of Southern California's Annenberg Innovation Lab, which supports the career development of people "working at the intersections of media, technology and culture." The Southwestern University Alumni Association has honored Bird as a Distinguished Young Alumnus.

== Gender transition ==
Bird came out publicly as transgender in a video posted to his YouTube channel on May 13, 2015. The Daily Dot reported on Bird's coming out, noting that the "Harry Potter and YouTube communities seem to have responded with universal support." Bird chose the name "Jackson" because it was one of the names his mother had considered should he have been assigned male at birth.
