= Greg Kotis =

American playwright

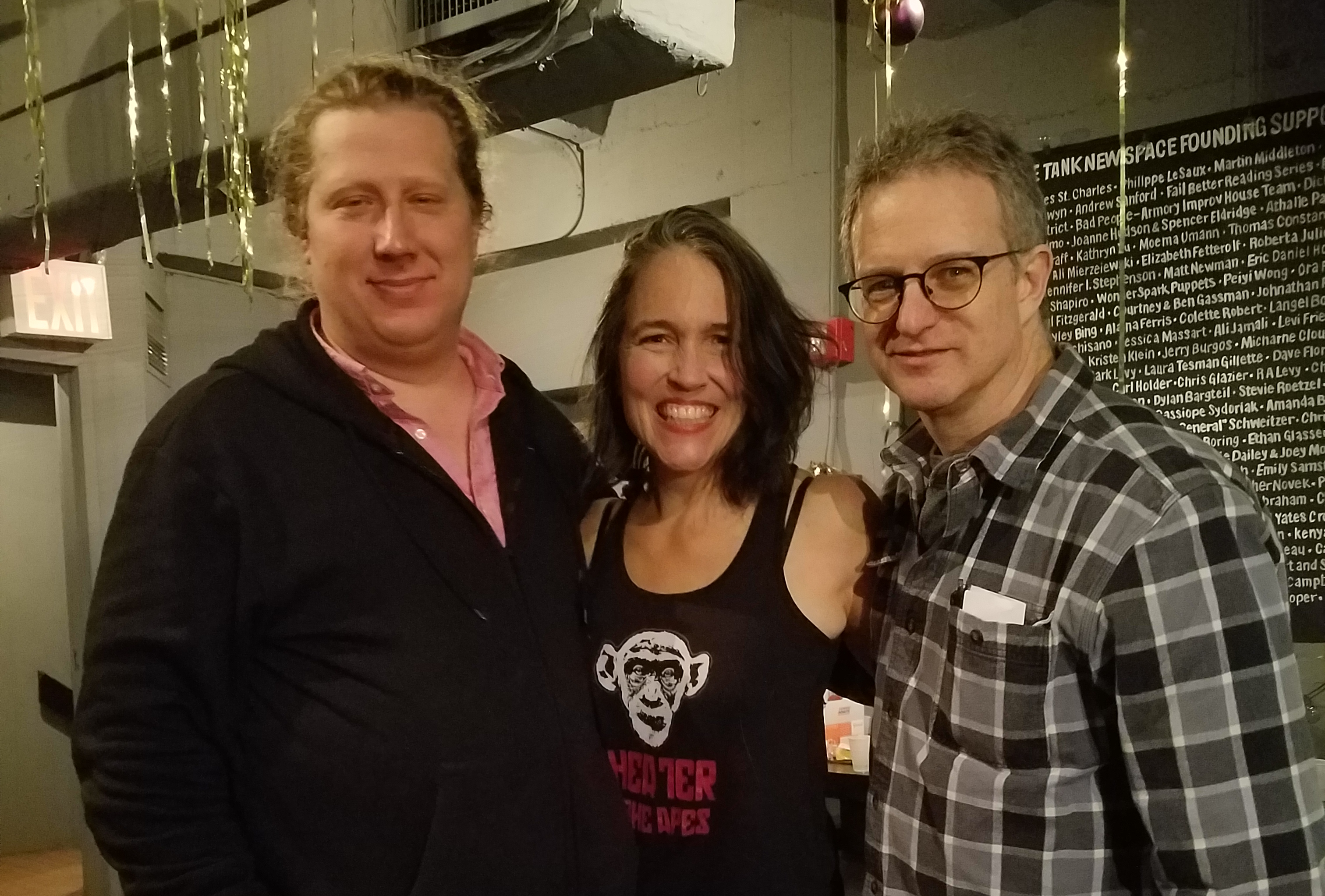
Kotis, right, with Ayun Halliday and David Carl at the opening of The Truth About Santa at The Tank

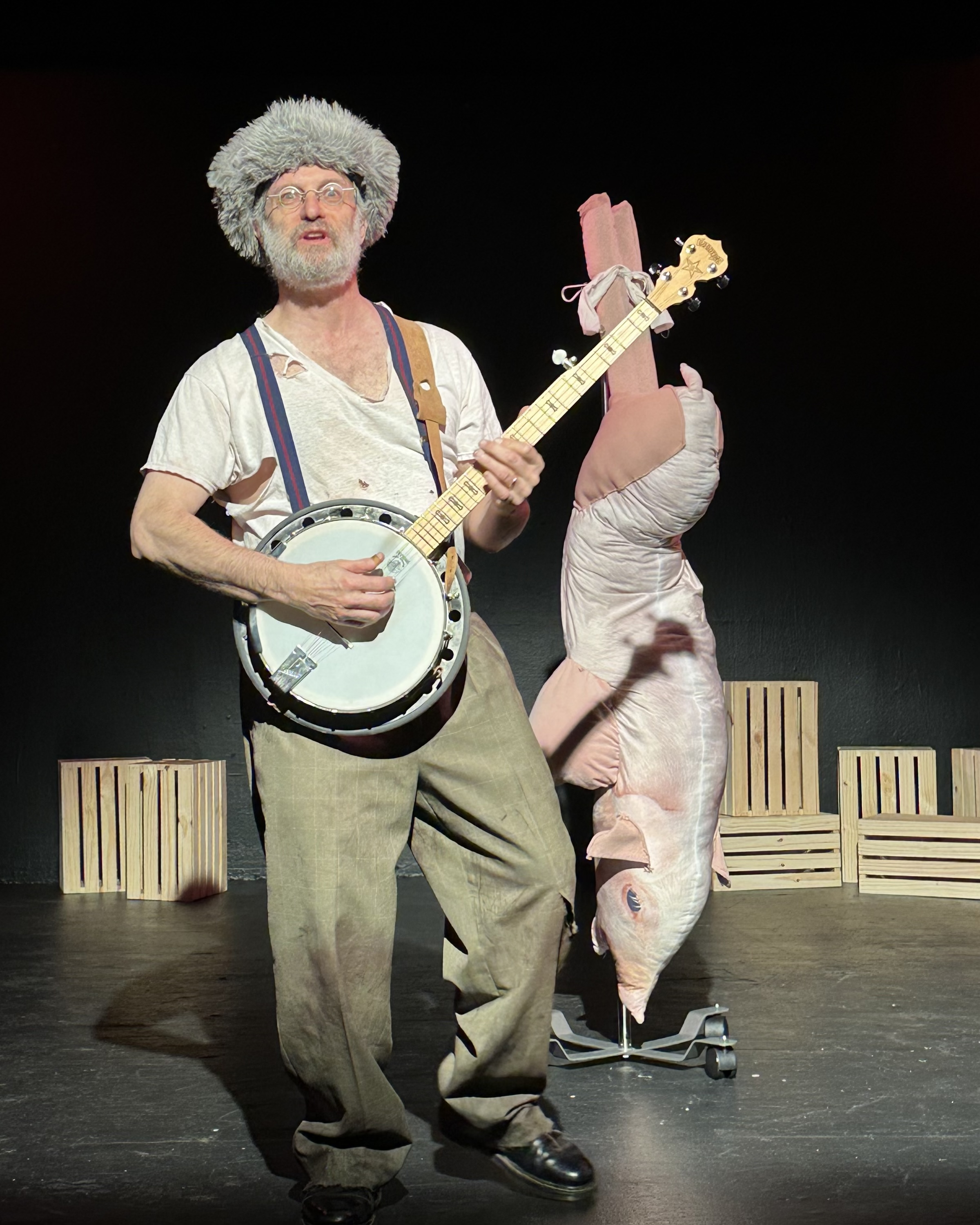
Greg Kotis as Pa in his post-apocalyptic bluegrass musical, The End of All Flesh, at the wild project in New York City, 2025

Greg Kotis (born 1965/1966) is an American playwright, best known for writing the book and co-writing the lyrics for the musical Urinetown, for which he won two Tony Awards in 2002.

== Biography ==
=== Career ===
Kotis studied political science at the University of Chicago, where he was a member of the improvisational and sketch comedy group Off-Off Campus. He dropped out when he took a course on the Short Comic Scene, realizing that he wanted to be part of the theatre industry instead. Kotis became a member of the Cardiff Giant Theatre Company and the Neo-Futurists. He moved to New York City in 1995 where he established a branch of the Neo-Futurists together with his wife Ayun Halliday. While moonlighting in fringe theater, Kotis worked as a location scout for the show Law & Order.

=== Urinetown ===
By 1998, Kotis had a daughter with his wife, and thus the responsibility of supporting a family. Kotis began writing Urinetown: The Musical, deciding it would be his last work:

"I told myself, I tried to find a life in the theater and we had some fun...it was time to move on. The theater life, particularly our theater life, wasn't making us any money. I would just stick to location scouting and apply myself to making money. With 'Urinetown,' I thought, 'Let's just have one last big laugh.' "

Kotis had gotten the idea for Urinetown when, on an ill-budgeted visit to Paris in 1995, he had to limit his trips to the city's prevalent pay toilets. Urinetown the Musical received ten Tony Award nominations: Best Director, Best Original Score, Best Book of a Musical, Best Musical, Best Actor in a Musical, two nominations for Best Actress in a Musical (Nancy Opel and Jennifer Laura Thompson), Best Featured Actress in a Musical, Best Choreography, and Best Orchestration. Urinetown has been performed around the world and in hundreds of American cities.

=== Other works ===
His post-apocalyptic bluegrass musical, The End of All Flesh, premiered at the wild project as part of the New York City Fringe in 2025, then transferred to the Magnet Theater in New York City after a sold-out run.

His musical ZM premiered at Teatro Milan in Mexico City in 2024, in a production directed by Miguel Septiem, the artistic director of Icaro Teatro.

His musical I Am Nobody premiered at The Tank in New York City and was forced to close after 3 previews and 3 performances, due to the COVID-19 pandemic. It was revived as part of the Monday Night Musicals series at the Magnet Theater, the second of Kotis's musicals to do so, for a six-week run beginning April 6, 2026 and ending on May 11th, 2026.

His play The Truth About Santa premiered at The Kraine Theater in New York City in 2008, and was revived at The Tank in New York City in 2018.

His play Pig Farm premiered at The Roundabout Theatre in New York City in June 2006.

He wrote a prequel to Urinetown with his theatrical partner Mark Hollmann titled “Yeast Nation (The Triumph of Life).” He is also working on a sequel to Urinetown called Good Luck In Space meant to close off the "Urinetown Trilogy.”

=== Personal life ===
Kotis married his wife, writer and actor Ayun Halliday, in 1995. They have two children, India (born 1997) and Milo (born 2000). They reside in East Harlem. They are co-founders of Theater of the Apes and perform in its monthly improvised bluegrass musical The Wayfaring Strangers.

== Awards and nominations ==
Year	Award	Category	Work	Result	Ref.
2001	Drama Desk Award	Outstanding Book of a Musical	Urinetown	Nominated	
2001	Drama Desk Award	Outstanding Book of a Musical	Urinetown	Nominated	
2002	Tony Award	Best Book of a Musical	Urinetown	Won	
2002	Tony Award	Original Score	Urinetown	Won	
