= Urinetown =

Satirical comedy musical

- Original Broadway windowcard
- Music: Mark Hollmann
- Lyrics: Mark Hollmann; Greg Kotis
- Book: Greg Kotis
- Productions: 2001 Off-Broadway; 2001 Broadway; 2003 US National Tour; 2014 West End; 2025 Off-Broadway
- Awards: Tony Award for Best Book of a Musical; Tony Award for Best Original Score

Urinetown: The Musical is a satirical comedy musical that premiered in 2001, with music by Mark Hollmann, lyrics by Hollmann and Greg Kotis, and book by Kotis. It satirizes the legal system, capitalism, social irresponsibility, populism, bureaucracy, corporate mismanagement, and municipal politics. The show also parodies musicals such as The Threepenny Opera, Fiddler on the Roof, The Cradle Will Rock and Les Misérables, and the Broadway musical itself as a form.

== Synopsis ==
=== Act I ===
Officer Lockstock, a policeman, grimly welcomes the audience, assisted by the street urchin Little Sally. According to the pair, a twenty-year drought has caused a terrible water shortage, making private toilets unthinkable. All restroom activities are done in public toilets (Public Amenities) controlled by a megacorporation called "Urine Good Company" (referred to as the UGC). To control water consumption, citizens have to pay to use the Amenities ("Too Much Exposition"). There are harsh laws ensuring that people pay to urinate, and if the laws are broken, the offender is sent to a place called "Urinetown", never to return.

The oppressed masses huddle in line at the poorest, filthiest urinal in town, Public Amenity #9, which is run by the rigid, harshly authoritarian Penelope Pennywise and her assistant, dashing young everyman Bobby Strong. Trouble ensues when Bobby's father Joseph "Old Man" Strong, unable to afford his daily urinal admission, asks Pennywise to let him go for free "just this once." After Old Man Strong's plea is dismissed ("It's a Privilege to Pee"), he urinates on the street, and Officers Lockstock and Barrel soon arrest him and escort him off to Urinetown ("It's a Privilege to Pee (Reprise)").

Later that day, in the corporate offices of Urine Good Company, CEO Caldwell B. Cladwell is discussing the new fee hikes with Senator Fipp, a politician firmly in Cladwell's pocket, when Cladwell's beautiful daughter, Hope Cladwell, arrives as the UGC's new fax/copy girl. As an introduction, the UGC staff sing a song praising their leader ("Mr. Cladwell").

Officers Lockstock and Barrel discuss the journey to Urinetown and how it reduces everyone, even the toughest, to screams ("The Cop Song"). Hope enters and encounters Bobby, who is distraught over his father's arrest and wonders if he could have done something to prevent it. Hope advises Bobby to follow his heart, and the two realize that they both want a happier world where people can pee for free. United by their belief, they fall in love ("Follow Your Heart"). Little Sally asks Officer Lockstock what Urinetown is like, but Lockstock replies that its power lies in its mystery and he cannot flippantly reveal that "there is no Urinetown, we just kill people", and that the reveal will not come until Act II, "with everybody singing and things like that."

The next day, Cladwell's assistant, Mr. McQueen, announces the new fee hikes set upon the urinals. Bobby concludes that the laws are wrong. Opening the doors of the urinal, despite Ms. Pennywise's protests, he begins a pee-for-free rebellion ("Look at the Sky").

Pennywise rushes to the offices of UGC, where she informs Cladwell of the revolution. The two share a moment, but are interrupted by the situation at hand. Cladwell vows to crush the rebellion, frightening Hope, then uses a series of increasingly convoluted metaphors involving killing a bunny to tell Hope that their privilege and responsibility is to oppress the poor ("Don't Be the Bunny").

Cladwell, McQueen, Fipp, Pennywise, Lockstock and Barrel arrive at Amenity #9 to snuff out the uprising. Learning that Hope is Cladwell's daughter, Bobby realizes that the only way out of the trap is to kidnap Hope to use as leverage against Cladwell. The rebels make a poor escape with Hope as their hostage. The police give chase, but the slow-motion choreography makes it impossible for the police to catch them. Lockstock vows to catch the poor as he tells the audience to enjoy intermission ("Act I Finale").

=== Act II ===
Lockstock welcomes everyone back and tells the audience that the rebels, with their hostage Hope, are in hiding. The rebels wonder what Urinetown is, and two of them, Little Becky Two-Shoes and Hot Blades Harry, explain their theories. Cladwell orders Lockstock to search harder for the rebels, threatening to send everyone to Urinetown if Hope is not found. Bobby and his mother Josephine hand out memos to the other Assistant Custodians, hoping that they will join them. Bobby is sure that Urinetown is nothing but a lie designed to scare the poor people. Lockstock catches Little Sally, but his threat of Urinetown doesn't work, because according to her, they are already there; it "isn't so much a place as it is a metaphysical place" that they are all in, including Lockstock. She escapes before Lockstock can ask her what "metaphysical" means. ("What is Urinetown?")

Convinced that Bobby, Josephine, and Little Sally have been captured, the rebels, particularly Hot Blades Harry and Little Becky Two-Shoes, decide that the best way to get revenge on Cladwell is to kill Hope ("Snuff That Girl"). They are interrupted by Bobby, who encourages the rebels to abandon revenge and instead focus on the effort toward freedom for all the town's inhabitants ("Run, Freedom, Run!"). Invigorated, the poor rally around Bobby, but balk at his statement that the violent fight could take decades. Just then, Pennywise bursts into the secret hideout and tells Bobby that Cladwell wants him to come to the UGC headquarters. Bobby goes, but only after the impatient rebels remind him that if anything happens to him, Hope will be killed. Pennywise fiercely swears that if any of the rebels harm Hope, she will have Bobby sent off to Urinetown. Bobby says goodbye to Hope, apologizes, and tells her to think of what they have ("Follow Your Heart (Reprise)").

At the UGC headquarters, Bobby is offered a suitcase full of cash and full amnesty to the rebels as long as Hope is returned and the people agree to the new fee hikes. Bobby refuses, and demands free access for the people. Cladwell orders the cops to escort Bobby to Urinetown—even if it means that the rebel poor will kill Hope. Horrified, Pennywise marvels at the depth of Cladwell's evil. Cladwell has her arrested as well. She, Hope, and Fipp sing of their regrets of falling for Cladwell's schemes. Meanwhile, Bobby is led to the top of the UGC building, and learns the truth: Urinetown is death. Lockstock and Barrel throw him off the building, killing him. ("Why Did I Listen To That Man?").

Little Sally returns to the hideout in a shocked daze, having just heard Bobby's last words. The ghost of Bobby sings, along with Little Sally, his last words, which are directed to Hope ("Tell Her I Love Her"). Just as the rebels are about to murder Hope in revenge, Pennywise enters and offers herself instead, proclaiming herself to be Hope's mother. Hope then convinces the rebels to let her lead them, and she, Penny, and the rebels march to the UGC offices. En route, they kill Officer Barrel (who had just confessed his love to a non-reciprocal Lockstock), Senator Fipp, and Mrs. Millennium (a UGC employee, typically double-cast with Little Becky Two-Shoes) ("We're Not Sorry").

Hope reveals to her father that she is still alive. Cladwell is overjoyed, until the rest of the poor reveal themselves. Hope tells him that his reign of terror is over, and after he and Pennywise reminisce about their past romance ("We're Not Sorry (Reprise)"), he is led to the top of the UGC building and thrown off.

With the town finally at peace, the age of fear is over and the toilets are made free to use. Lockstock reappears and explains that he has not been killed by the rebels, as killing the narrator would end the show prematurely. He then informs the audience that the town's limited water supply has quickly disappeared, due to resource mismanagement by a popularity-obsessed Hope. The remaining townsfolk, dying of thirst, are led in a march by Hope. Lockstock wraps up loose ends, and insinuates that the townsfolk eventually killed Hope. The townsfolk sing that "This [town] is Urinetown! Always it's been Urinetown!", and Lockstock closes the show with the cry "Hail Malthus!", which the townsfolk repeat. ("I See A River").

== History ==
Greg Kotis had the idea for Urinetown while traveling in Europe. A traveling student on a budget, he encountered a pay toilet and began writing shortly thereafter, joining with Mark Hollmann for the journey to Broadway. Initially, no production companies were interested in optioning the musical, but finally the Neo-Futurists, an experimental theatre group from Chicago, agreed to produce Urinetown for their 1999–2000 season. Kotis, his wife, and original cast member Spencer Kayden belonged to the group. Plans with the Neo-Futurists later fell through, so John Clancy of the New York Fringe Festival accepted the show into the festival. Playwright David Auburn, a friend of Kotis and Hollmann, came to see the show and immediately called the production company The Araca Group. The company optioned the musical, and it opened off-Broadway at the American Theatre for Actors, transferring to Broadway in September 2001. Originally planned to open on September 13, the show contained several references which, after the September 11 attacks, would prove offensive. Ultimately, only one line was removed from the script, and the show opened September 20, 2001.

== Productions ==
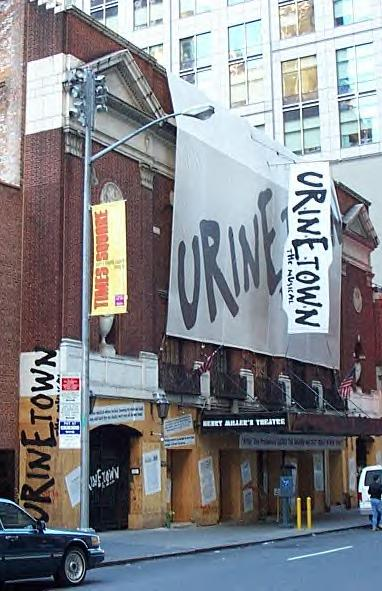
Urinetown at Henry Miller's Theatre in 2007

Urinetown debuted at the New York International Fringe Festival, and then was produced Off-Broadway at the American Theatre for Actors from May 6, 2001, to June 25, 2001. The musical then opened on Broadway at Henry Miller's Theatre, running from September 20, 2001, through January 18, 2004, totaling 25 previews and 965 performances. It was nominated for 10 Tony Awards and won three.

It was directed by John Rando and featured music and lyrics by Mark Hollman, book and lyrics by Greg Kotis, and choreography by John Carrafa. The original cast included Hunter Foster (as Bobby Strong, later replaced by Tom Cavanagh), Jeff McCarthy (as Officer Lockstock), Nancy Opel (as Penelope Pennywise), John Cullum (as Caldwell B. Cladwell), Jennifer Laura Thompson (as Hope Cladwell), Spencer Kayden (as Little Sally), John Deyle (as Senator Fipp), and Ken Jennings (as Old Man Strong/Hot Blades Harry). Principal cast changes included James Barbour as Officer Lockstock, Carolee Carmello and Victoria Clark as Penelope Pennywise and Charles Shaughnessy as Caldwell B. Cladwell as well as Amy Spanger as Hope Cladwell.

A national tour starring Christiane Noll and Tom Hewitt began in San Francisco, California, on June 13, 2003. A production began performances at Chicago's Mercury Theater in March 2006 and closed in May 2006, followed by New Line Theatre in St. Louis in 2007.

The characters of Officer Lockstock and Little Sally are featured in what has become a yearly tradition at the Broadway Cares/Equity Fights AIDS annual Red Bucket Follies (formerly, Gypsy of the Year) benefit concert, in which the characters – portrayed by actors Jennifer Cody and Don Richard, both of whom understudied the roles in the original cast – perform a short comedy sketch making fun of current Broadway shows.

An Australian production directed by Simon Phillips for the Melbourne Theatre Company was staged at the Playhouse in April–May 2004. The cast featured Kane Alexander (Bobby Strong), Shane Bourne (Officer Lockstock), Lisa McCune (Hope Cladwell), Rhonda Burchmore (Penelope Pennywise) and Gerry Connolly (Caldwell B. Cladwell). The production transferred to Sydney for the Sydney Theatre Company at the Sydney Theatre in June–July 2006. The Sydney season retained the principal cast from Melbourne, with the exception of David Campbell taking over the role of Bobby.

The UK premiere directed by Jamie Lloyd opened at London's St. James Theatre in April 2014, transferred to the Apollo Theatre in September 2014, and ended its run on 3 January 2015.

In 2015, a production of the show opened in São Paulo, Brazil, at the Teatro do Nucleo Experimental. In 2019, Urinetown opened in Singapore, produced by Pangdemonium Theatre Company.

In 2019, the first Danish production of Urinetown opened at Fredericia Teater.

In 2023, the Turkish production of Urinetown opened at the Zorlu Performance Arts Center. It had its last show on February 15, 2025.

In 2024, another Danish production opened March 22 at Østre Gasværk Teater, Copenhagen, notably starring Kurt Ravn as Caldwell B. Cladwell.

In February 2025, the show was revived as a part of New York City Center's Encores! series. The production featured Jordan Fisher as Bobby, Christopher Fitzgerald as Barrel, Greg Hildreth as Lockstock, Keala Settle as Pennywise, Stephanie Styles as Hope, and Rainn Wilson as Cladwell. Taran Killam had originally been cast as Lockstock but had to drop out of the show due to his Pacific Palisades home burning down during the January 2025 Southern California wildfires.

== Casts ==
Note: Below are the principal casts of all official major productions of the musical.

| Role | Off-Broadway | Broadway | National Tour | London Premiere | West End | Turkish Production | NYCC Encores! |
|---|---|---|---|---|---|---|---|
| Bobby Strong | Hunter Foster | Hunter Foster | Charlie Pollock | Richard Fleeshman | Matthew Seadon-Young | Mehmet Kahya Aykaç | Jordan Fisher |
| Caldwell B. Cladwell | John Cullum | John Cullum | Ron Holgate | Simon Paisley Day | Simon Paisley Day | Settar Tanrıöğen | Rainn Wilson |
| Hope Cladwell | Jennifer Laura Thompson | Jennifer Laura Thompson | Christiane Noll | Rosanna Hyland | Rosanna Hyland | Ceren Gündoğdu | Stephanie Styles |
| Penelope Pennywise | Nancy Opel | Nancy Opel | Beth McVey | Jenna Russell | Jenna Russell | Canan Ergüder | Keala Settle |
| Little Sally | Spencer Kayden | Spencer Kayden | Meghan Strange | Karis Jack | Karis Jack | Gizem Erdem | Pearl Scarlett Gold |
| Officer Lockstock | Jeff McCarthy | Jeff McCarthy | Tom Hewitt | Jonathan Slinger | Jonathan Slinger | Doruk Şengün | Greg Hildreth |
| Officer Barrel | Daniel Marcus | Daniel Marcus | Richard Ruiz | Adam Pearce | Nathan Amzi | Efe Ünal | Christopher Fitzgerald |
| Mr. McQueen | David Beach | David Beach | Jamie LaVerdiere | Marc Elliott | Marc Elliott | Adnan Yiğit | Jeff Hiller |
| Senator Fipp | John Deyle | John Deyle | Dennis Kelly | Mark Meadows | Mark Meadows | Taner Tunçay | Josh Breckenridge |
| Old Man Strong / Hot Blades Harry | Ken Jennings | Ken Jennings | Jim Corti | Cory English | Cory English | Taner Tunçay | Kevin Cahoon |

=== Notable replacements ===
Broadway (2001–2004)

- Bobby: Tom Cavanagh, Luther Creek
- Hope: Anastasia Barzee, Amy Spanger
- Ms. Pennywise: Victoria Clark, Carolee Carmello
- Cladwell: Charles Shaughnessy
- Lockstock: James Barbour

== Characters ==
Major Characters

- Bobby Strong – The dashing young everyman who works for Miss Pennywise as the Assistant Custodian at the poorest, filthiest urinal in town; the eventual protagonist and romantic hero who starts a revolution, and falls in love with Hope Cladwell along the way.
- Caldwell B. Cladwell – The evil president and owner of the Urine Good Company, a miserly moneygrubber who gleefully exploits the poor.
- Hope Cladwell – Cladwell's ravishingly beautiful daughter, torn between her love for her father and her new love for Bobby. Having just returned from the Most Expensive University in the World, she eventually joins Bobby as part of the Revolution.
- Penelope Pennywise – The tough, jaded warden of the poorest, filthiest urinal in town. A shrewd, penny-scrounging cheapskate, Pennywise is a figure of authority and lives to maintain order at the public bathrooms.
- Little Sally – A precocious, thoroughly irreverent and very intelligent street urchin; the co-narrator who always outsmarts Lockstock, and constantly questions the play's logic.
- Officer Lockstock – The principal narrator; a policeman in charge of finding guilty pee-ers.
- Officer Barrel – Lockstock's partner.
- Mr. McQueen – Cladwell's assistant. A sneaky man who will do or say anything to save himself.
- Senator Fipp – A corrupt politician in Cladwell's pocket.
- Joseph "Old Man" Strong – Bobby's father, whose refusal to pay the fee gets him sent to Urinetown.
- Josephine "Ma" Strong – Bobby's mother, a strong-willed old woman who is able to withstand the hard hand life has dealt her.

The Poor

- Hot Blades Harry – A dangerous and unpredictable rebel.
- Little Becky Two-Shoes – A young, pregnant woman. Harry's "Mate".
- Soupy Sue – An affectionate member of the gang.
- Tiny Tom – A confused man-boy.
- Robby the Stockfish – A poor rebel.
- Billy Boy Bill – A poor rebel.

The Rich

- Mrs. Millennium – Office worker who is also Cladwell's head secretary.
- Dr. Billeaux – A scientist for Urine Good Company.

== Musical numbers ==
Act I

- "Overture" – Orchestra
- "Too Much Exposition" – Lockstock, Little Sally, and Company
- "Urinetown" – Full Company
- "It's a Privilege to Pee" – Pennywise and the Poor
- "It's a Privilege to Pee (Reprise)" – Lockstock and the Poor †
- "Mr. Cladwell" – Cladwell, Hope, Mr. McQueen, and the Staff of UGC
- "Cop Song" – Lockstock, Barrel, and Cops
- "Follow Your Heart" – Hope and Bobby
- "Look at the Sky" – Bobby and the Poor
- "Don't Be the Bunny" – Cladwell and the Staff of UGC
- "Act One Finale" – Bobby, Cladwell, Hope, and Company

Act II

- "What is Urinetown?" – Little Becky Two Shoes, Hot Blades Harry, Cladwell, Bobby, Little Sally, Lockstock, and Company
- "Snuff That Girl" – Hot Blades Harry, Little Becky Two Shoes, and the Poor
- "Run, Freedom, Run!" – Bobby and the Poor
- "Follow Your Heart (Reprise)" – Hope †
- "Why Did I Listen to that Man?" – Pennywise, Fipp, Lockstock, Barrel, Hope and Bobby
- "Tell Her I Love Her" – Little Sally, Bobby, and the Poor
- "We're Not Sorry" – Little Sally, Hot Blades Harry, Josephine, Soupy Sue, and Company
- "I'm Not Sorry (Reprise)" – Cladwell and Pennywise
- "I See a River" – Hope, Little Becky Two Shoes, Josephine, Lockstock, Little Sally, and Company

† - Notes a song not included in the Original Cast Recording

== Awards and honors ==
=== Original Off-Broadway production ===
| Year | Award Ceremony | Category | Nominee | Result |
|---|---|---|---|---|
| 2001 | Clarence Derwent Award | Most Promising Female Performer | Spencer Kayden | Won |
| 2001 | Drama Desk Award | Outstanding Musical | | Nominated |
| 2001 | Drama Desk Award | Outstanding Book of a Musical | Greg Kotis | Nominated |
| 2001 | Drama Desk Award | Outstanding Featured Actor in a Musical | Jeff McCarthy | Nominated |
| 2001 | Drama Desk Award | Outstanding Featured Actress in a Musical | Spencer Kayden | Nominated |
| 2001 | Drama Desk Award | Outstanding Director of a Musical | John Rando | Nominated |
| 2001 | Drama Desk Award | Outstanding Choreography | John Carrafa | Nominated |
| 2001 | Drama Desk Award | Outstanding Orchestrations | Bruce Coughlin | Nominated |
| 2001 | Drama Desk Award | Outstanding Music | Mark Hollmann | Nominated |
| 2001 | Drama Desk Award | Outstanding Lyrics | Mark Hollmann and Greg Kotis | Nominated |
| 2002 | Lucille Lortel Award | Outstanding Musical | | Won |
| 2002 | Lucille Lortel Award | Outstanding Lead Actor | Hunter Foster | Nominated |
| 2002 | Lucille Lortel Award | Outstanding Director | John Rando | Nominated |
| 2002 | Lucille Lortel Award | Outstanding Choreographer | John Carrafa | Won |
| 2002 | Lucille Lortel Award | Outstanding Costume Design | Jonathan Bixby | Nominated |
| 2002 | Lucille Lortel Award | Outstanding Lighting Design | Brian MacDevitt | Nominated |
| 2002 | Lucille Lortel Award | Outstanding Scenic Design | Scott Pask | Nominated |

=== Original Broadway production ===
| Year | Award Ceremony | Category | Nominee | Result |
|---|---|---|---|---|
| 2002 | Tony Award | Best Musical | | Nominated |
| 2002 | Tony Award | Best Book of a Musical | Greg Kotis | Won |
| 2002 | Tony Award | Best Original Score | Mark Hollmann and Greg Kotis | Won |
| 2002 | Tony Award | Best Performance by a Leading Actor in a Musical | John Cullum | Nominated |
| 2002 | Tony Award | Best Performance by a Leading Actress in a Musical | Nancy Opel | Nominated |
| 2002 | Tony Award | Best Performance by a Leading Actress in a Musical | Jennifer Laura Thompson | Nominated |
| 2002 | Tony Award | Best Performance by a Featured Actress in a Musical | Spencer Kayden | Nominated |
| 2002 | Tony Award | Best Direction of a Musical | John Rando | Won |
| 2002 | Tony Award | Best Choreography | John Carrafa | Nominated |
| 2002 | Tony Award | Best Orchestrations | Bruce Coughlin | Nominated |
| 2002 | Outer Critics Circle Award | Outstanding New Broadway Musical | | Won |
| 2002 | Outer Critics Circle Award | Outstanding Actor in a Musical | Hunter Foster | Nominated |
| 2002 | Outer Critics Circle Award | Outstanding Actor in a Musical | John Cullum | Nominated |
| 2002 | Outer Critics Circle Award | Outstanding Featured Actress in a Musical | Spencer Kayden | Won |
| 2002 | Outer Critics Circle Award | Outstanding Director | John Rando | Won |
| 2002 | Outer Critics Circle Award | Outstanding Choreography | John Carrafa | Nominated |
| 2002 | Drama League Award | Outstanding Production of a Musical | | Won |
| 2002 | Theatre World Award | | Spencer Kayden | Won |

=== 2025 Off-Broadway production ===
| Year | Award Ceremony | Category | Nominee | Result |
|---|---|---|---|---|
| 2025 | Drama League Awards | Outstanding Revival of a Musical | Urinetown | Nominated |

== See also ==
- Politics in musicals
- Thomas Robert Malthus
- A Boy and His Dog
- "It's a Good Life" (The Twilight Zone)
- Euren, Wisconsin
