= John Carrafa =

American theater and film director/choreographer

John Carrafa is a two time Tony-Nominated and Emmy-Nominated choreographer and director. His work appears in over 160 episodes of television, 28 feature films and nine Broadway productions as well as countless Off-Broadway and regional theater productions. He is currently series choreographer of HBO's The Gilded Age (now in Season 4) and Only Murders In The Building (now in season 5) and recently completed principal photography in New York on a new untitled feature film starring Stephen Merchant and Cameron Diaz.

He currently lives and works in New York City, Los Angeles California and London, England.

== Broadway and theater ==
- Love! Valour! Compassion! - Off-Broadway (1994) Broadway (1995)
- Dirty Blonde - Off-Broadway (2000) and Broadway (2001)
- Urinetown - Off-Broadway (2001) and Broadway (2002)
- A Little Night Music - Kennedy Center Sondheim Celebration, 2002
- Into The Woods - Broadway (2002)
- Dance of the Vampires - Broadway (2003)
- Good Vibrations - Broadway (2005)

== Filmography ==
- Brain Donors - (1992)
- Love! Valour! Compassion! - (1997)
- The Last Days of Disco - (1998)
- The Thomas Crown Affair - (1999)
- The Polar Express - (2004)
- Who's The Top? - (2005)
- The Other Guys - (2010)
- Something Borrowed - (2011)

== Television ==
- Sex and The City - (1999)
- Big Love - (2010)
- Ugly Betty - (2009)
- Blue Bloods - (2011)
- The Big C - (2012)
- Elementary - (2012)
- Nashville - (2013)
- Nurse Jackie - (2013)
- Last Week Tonight - (2019)

== Awards ==
- World Dance Award for Feature Film - (2012)
- Director of Best Musical Daegu International Theater Festival - *"Academy" (2010)
- Honorable Mention Best Director NYMF - *"Academy" (2009)
- Joseph Jefferson Award - *"Animal Crackers" (2009) Nomination
- Media Choreography Honors - for *"The Polar Express" (2005)
- Dora Award - *"Urinetown" (2004)
- Drama Desk - *"Urinetown" (2001) Nomination
- Lucille Lortel Award - *"Urinetown" (2001)
- Outer Critics Circle Award - *"Urinetown" (2001) Nomination
- Tony Award - *"Urinetown" (2002) Nomination
- Tony Award - *"Into The Woods" (2002) Nomination
