= Spencer Kayden =

American actress, comedian and writer

- Education: Northwestern University
- Occupations: Actress, comedian, writer
- Years active: 1996–present
- Spouse: Mark Harelik (m. 2004)
- Children: 1

Spencer Kayden is an American actress, comedian and writer. Kayden played Little Sally in the Broadway musical Urinetown and was a cast member on sketch comedy series MADtv. She also voiced Mrs. Pepper on Blue's Clues, taking over the role from Penelope Jewkes after the first season.

== Biography ==
Spencer Kayden was born the only girl out of four siblings to a father who worked as a pop-up book publisher and a mother who worked as a psychotherapist. Kayden grew up in Orange County, California, and went on to study drama at Northwestern University in Evanston, Illinois. She joined the Chicago cast of Too Much Light Makes the Baby Go Blind and moved to New York in 1993 to start the New York run of the show.

Kayden received critical acclaim and notice for her performance in the musical Urinetown, where she played Little Sally, the pig-tailed girl who helps explain the plot. She played in the 1999 New York International Fringe Festival production, and then was in the original Off-Broadway and Broadway casts in 2001 and returned in 2003. The CurtainUp reviewer noted in reviewing the Off-Broadway production: "But while Spencer Kayden does everything right in her portrayal of the droll little girl who alternates begging for 'penny for a pee' with Shirley Temple/Charlie McCarthy exchanges with the deceptively kindly neighborhood cop, her Sally is wrong. This 'bad' idea is outrageously good for lots of laughs. The central joke works."

It is from her theater performances that she was discovered by Fox executives and cast as a featured performer on MADtv.

Kayden also played the role of Mrs. Pepper in the popular Nickelodeon kids series Blue's Clues since 1996.

Kayden starred in the farce Don't Dress for Dinner at the Royal George Theatre, Chicago, Illinois, from November 2008 to January 2009. She reprised her role as the cook in the Broadway production, which opened in March 2012 at the American Airlines Theatre.

== Personal life ==
Kayden is the sister of film director Michael Almereyda. She has been married to actor Mark Harelik since 2004, and they have one child together. She has listed Irene Dunne, Peter Sellers and Frances McDormand as some of her acting idols.

== Awards and nominations ==
Year	Award	Category	Work	Result
2001	Drama Desk Award	Drama Desk Award for Outstanding Featured Actress in a Musical	Urinetown	Nominated
2001	Clarence Derwent Awards	Most Promising Female Performer	Urinetown	Won
2002	Tony Award	Best Featured Actress in a Musical	Urinetown	Nominated
2002	Outer Critics Circle Award	Outstanding Featured Actress in a Musical	Urinetown	Won
2002	Theatre World Award		Urinetown	Won
2012	Tony Award	Best Featured Actress in a Play	Don't Dress for Dinner	Nominated
2012	Outer Critics Circle Award	Outstanding Featured Actress in a Play	Don't Dress for Dinner	Won
