= Jennifer Laura Thompson =

American actor-singer (born 1969)

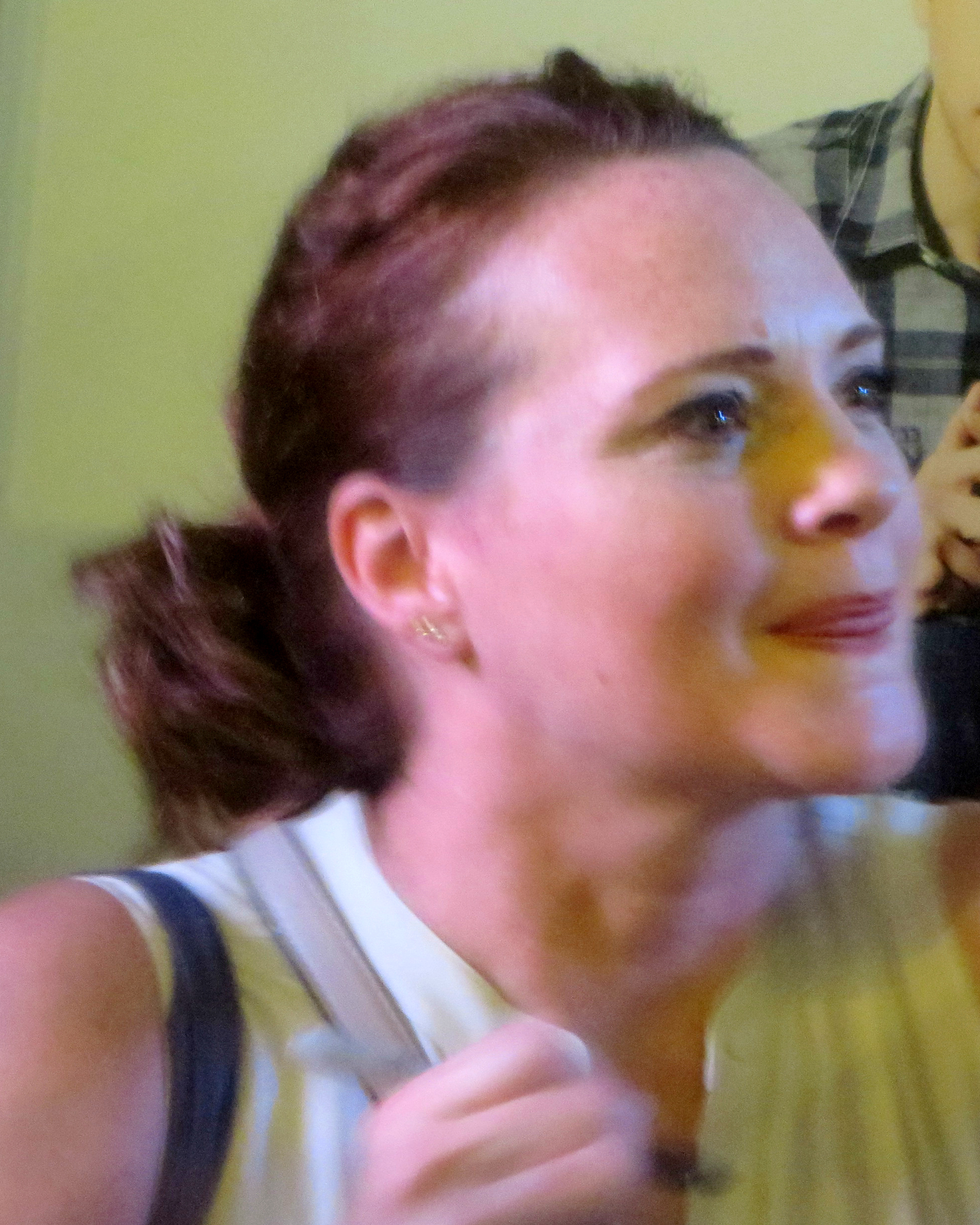
- Thompson in 2017.
- Born: December 5, 1969 (age 56); Southfield, Michigan, U.S.
- Education: University of Michigan
- Occupations: Actress, singer
- Years active: 1992–present
- Spouse: John Kain (m. 1999)
- Children: 1

Jennifer Laura Thompson (born December 5, 1969) is an American actress and singer, best known for her theatrical performances. She originated the role of Cynthia Murphy in the Tony Award-winning musical, Dear Evan Hansen, and received a Tony Award nomination for her performance as Hope Cladwell in Urinetown. She is also known for being the first replacement for Kristin Chenoweth as Glinda in Wicked on Broadway.

== Career ==
Thompson made her Broadway debut in 1998 as Ariel Moore in the original cast of Footloose. She also originated the role of Hope Cladwell in both the off-Broadway and Broadway productions of Urinetown. She received a Tony Award nomination for the 2002 Best Leading Actress in a Musical category for her performance as Hope in Urinetown; the award went to Sutton Foster for her performance in Thoroughly Modern Millie.

Thompson is also well known for being the first replacement actress for the role of Glinda in the Broadway hit musical Wicked at the Gershwin Theatre. Her first performance replacing Kristin Chenoweth was on July 20, 2004, and continued in the role for over ten months. During her run as Glinda, she performed opposite Idina Menzel and Shoshana Bean as Elphaba. She departed the company on May 29, 2005. She was replaced by Megan Hilty, who had served as her standby. Thompson would later return to the theatre on October 27, 2008, to take part in a one-off performance titled "The Yellow Brick Road Not Taken", a presentation of rough scenes and songs cut from early drafts of Wicked.

Off-Broadway, Thompson played the lead role of Charlotte in the Michael John LaChiusa musical, Little Fish at the Second Stage Theatre. She also appeared in A Doll's Life at the York Theatre, Good News at the Westchester Broadway Theatre (as Connie), Pardon My English, Strike up the Band!, and most recently, Of Thee I Sing for City Center Encores!, and Tip-Toes at Carnegie Hall. She played Julie Jordan in the first national tour of Carousel, and appeared in national tours for Jesus Christ Superstar (as Mary) and The Music of Andrew Lloyd Webber. Regionally, she has played roles such as Laura in The Glass Menagerie, Corie in Barefoot in the Park and Luisa in The Fantasticks. She has also made a guest appearance on television's Law & Order: Special Victims Unit.

She also starred in the Encores! production of On the Town which ran from November 19 to 23, 2008.

Thompson starred as Diana in the Broadway revival of Lend Me a Tenor, which officially opened April 4, 2010, at the Music Box Theatre.

On December 17, 2010, it was announced that she would be featured in the premiere of the musical version of the film Little Miss Sunshine at the La Jolla Playhouse in La Jolla, California. The musical ran at La Jolla from February 15 through March 27, 2011, with Thompson in the role of Sheryl Hoover. She did not play in the Off-Broadway production (which ran in November to December 2013).

Thompson starred as Eileen Evergreen in the musical Nice Work If You Can Get It, which opened on Broadway in spring 2012 at the Imperial Theatre.

Thompson has also starred in the role of Cynthia Murphy in the Broadway production of Dear Evan Hansen at the Music Box Theatre from December 4, 2016, to August 4, 2019.

== Personal life ==
Thompson has a husband, John Kain, and a son, Thomas. She attended and graduated from Birmingham Groves High School in 1987. She graduated from the University of Michigan with a Bachelor of Fine Arts in Musical Theatre in 1991.

== Theatre credits ==
Year	Production	Role	Notes
1992	Jesus Christ Superstar	Mary Magdalene	Concert/Tour
1994	A Doll's Life	Lady of the Evening/Jailed Woman/Helga/Brigit	Off-Broadway
1995	Good News	Constance Lane	Regional
1996–1997	Carousel	Heavenly Friend/Jenny Peters/Understudy: Julie Jordan	National Tour
1998	Strike Up the Band	Ensemble	Encores!
1998	Footloose	Ariel Moore	Broadway
2001	Urinetown	Hope Cladwell	Off-Broadway
2001	Urinetown	Hope Cladwell	Broadway
2003	Little Fish	Charlotte	Off-Broadway
2004	Wicked	Glinda (Replacement)	Broadway
2004	Pardon My English	Frieda Bauer	Encores!
2006	Of Thee I Sing	Mary Turner	Encores!
2006	Little Fish	Ensemble	Concert
2008	On the Town	Claire de Loone	Encores!
2009	Judas & Me	The Virgin Mary	Off-Broadway
2010	Lend Me a Tenor	Diana	Broadway
2011	Little Miss Sunshine	Sheryl	La Jolla Playhouse
2011	Company	Jenny	Concert
2011	Kiki Baby	Marina	Off-Broadway
2012	Nice Work If You Can Get It	Eileen Evergreen	Broadway
2015	Lady, Be Good!	Josephine Vanderwater	Encores!
2015	Dear Evan Hansen	Cynthia Murphy	Arena Stage
2016–2019	Dear Evan Hansen	Cynthia Murphy	Off-Broadway
2016–2019	Dear Evan Hansen	Cynthia Murphy	Broadway
2019	Into the Wild	Performer	Playwrights Horizons
2022	Parade	Sally Slaton	New York City Center

== Filmography ==
=== Films ===
Year	Title	Role	Notes
2011	Company	Jenny	Concert film
2015	Construction	Janet	

=== Television ===
Year	Title	Character	Episodes
2002	Law & Order: Special Victims Unit	Aimee Slocum	1 episode
2009	The Battery's Down	Jess Wilson	1 episode
2011	Person of Interest	Mrs. Kovach	1 episode
2014	Elementary	Rachel Brown	1 episode
2016	The Mysteries of Laura	Mindy Lewis	1 episode
2019	Tales of The City	Maura Bradshaw	1 episode

== Awards and nominations ==
Year	Award	Category	Work	Result
2002	Tony Award	Best Actress in a Musical	Urinetown	Nominated
2005	Broadway.com Audience Choice Awards	Favorite Replacement (Female)	Wicked	Won
2012	Grammy Awards	Best Musical Theater Album	Nice Work If You Can Get It	Nominated
2016	Helen Hayes Award	Outstanding Supporting Actress in a Musical	Dear Evan Hansen	Nominated
2017	Broadway.com Audience Choice Awards	Favorite Featured Actress in a Musical	Dear Evan Hansen	Nominated
2018	Grammy Awards	Best Musical Theater Album	Dear Evan Hansen	Won
2018	Daytime Emmy Awards	Outstanding Musical Performance in a Daytime Program	Dear Evan Hansen	Won
