= Katie Foster-Barnes =

British actress

Katie Foster-Barnes is a British actress. She made her stage debut in 2001, as Betty Whitehouse in Dangerous Corner at the Garrick Theatre and earned a Whatsonstage Award nomination for her performance. Her performance was praised by London critics.

She has appeared in other West End theatre shows, including Beautiful and Damned at the Lyric Theatre, London, and as Wendy in Peter Pan at the Savoy Theatre. She appeared in Relatively Speaking and the musical Little Fish.

In television, Foster-Barnes has appeared in Vera, Casualty, EastEnders and Doctors. She was awarded Best Actress in 2016 at the ATC Seneca Awards for her portrayal of Amelia in the radio drama Beric the Briton.
