= Mark Hollmann =

American composer and lyricist (born 1963)

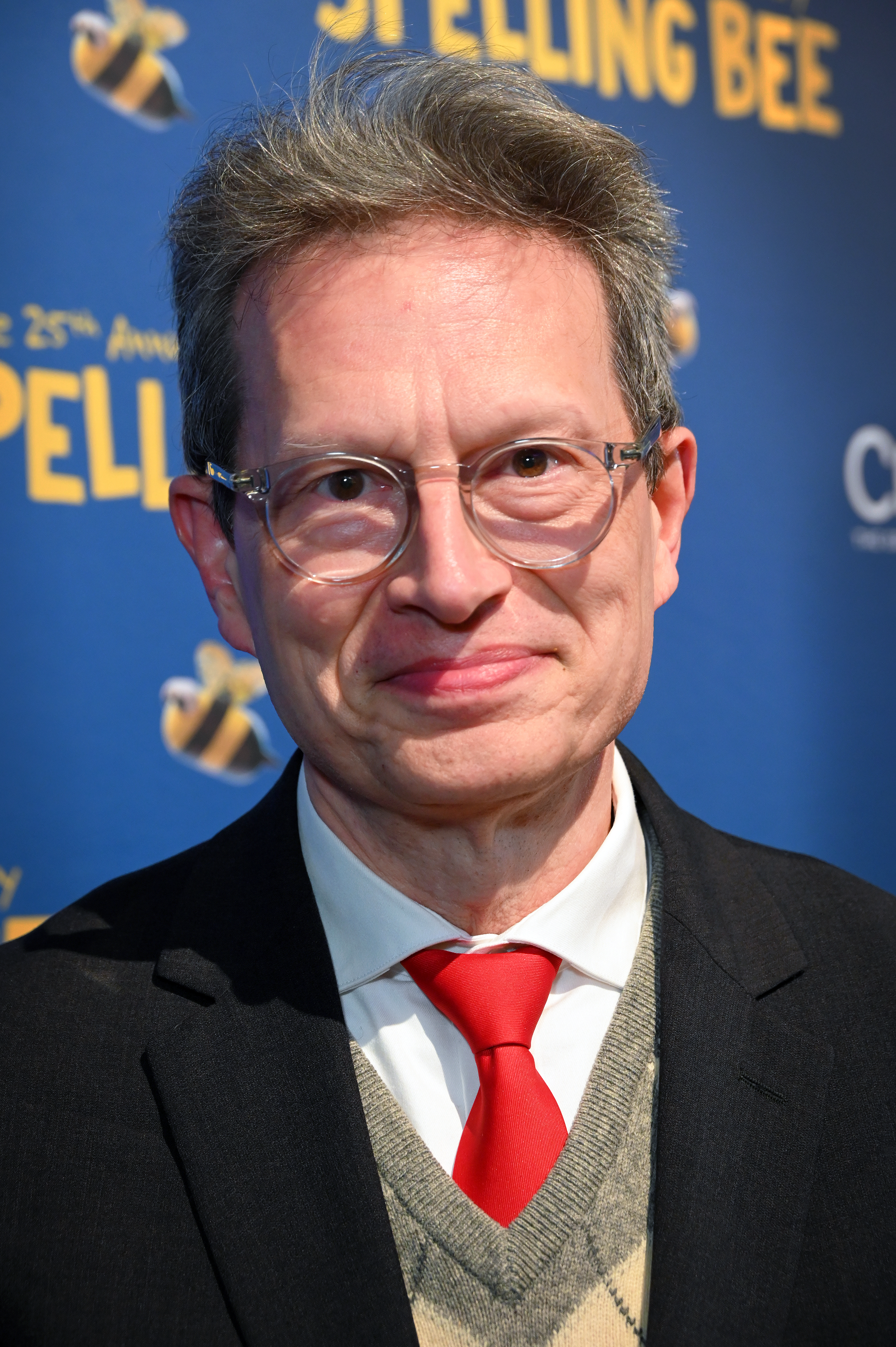
- Hollmann in 2025
- Born: October 14, 1963 (age 62); Belleville, Illinois, U.S.
- Education: University of Chicago
- Occupations: Lyricist; composer
- Years active: 1985–present

Mark Hollmann (born 1963) is an American composer and lyricist.

== Life and career ==
Hollmann grew up in Fairview Heights, Illinois, where he graduated from Belleville Township High School East in 1981. He won a 2002 Tony Award and a 2001 Obie Award for his music and lyrics to Urinetown. He is a former ensemble member of the Cardiff-Giant Theatre Company in Chicago. He played trombone for the Chicago art rock band Maestro Subgum and the Whole, and piano for The Second City national touring company and Chicago City Limits, an improv company in New York City. He attended the musical theatre writing workshop Making Tuners at Theatre Building Chicago and the BMI Lehman Engel Musical Theater Workshop in New York. While at the Making Turners workshop he began a show with Chicago-based writer Jack Helbig that became "The Girl, the Grouch, and the Goat," which has had professional productions in Los Angeles and Chicago.

Hollmann is a member of the Dramatists Guild of America and ASCAP. He lives in Manhattan with his wife, Jillian, and their sons. He currently is working on a new musical with his theatrical partner Greg Kotis titled Good Luck In Space, meant to close off the “Urinetown Trilogy” with Yeast Nation (The Triumph of Life) being the first installment.
