= Neo-Futurists =

Experimental theater troupe based on aesthetics of honesty, speed and brevity

The Neo-Futurists
- The Neo-Futurists logo
- Established: 1988

The Neo-Futurists are an experimental theater troupe founded by Greg Allen in 1988, based on an aesthetics of honesty, speed and brevity. Neo-Futurist theatre was inspired in part by the Italian Futurist movement from the early 20th century. Originating in Chicago, branches of the Neo-Futurists also exist in New York City, San Francisco, and London (the latter under the name Degenerate Fox).

== Aesthetic ==
The Neo-Futurist aesthetic states that everything that transpires in their theater be non-illusory, which is to say that they pretend nothing; actors only play themselves. All plays take place on a stage, specifically, the stage on which they are performed, in the present. If one of the performers reports that something has happened, it has happened. Much of their work contains the possibility of failure, a unique theatrical component that keeps them and the audience honest.

== History ==
The Neo-Futurists began with the show Too Much Light Makes the Baby Go Blind: 30 Plays in 60 Minutes, often abbreviated as TMLMTBGB (though many refer to it simply as TML). For the first few years, the Neo-Futurist movement consisted entirely of TMLMTBGB, but then expanded to include "prime time productions." These productions began late evening, as opposed to TMLMTBGB's late-night starting time (10:30pm).

The Neo-Futurists have published three books of plays from TMLMTBGB - two books of regular plays, and one of plays that use only one actor. They've also released one CD recording of plays from Too Much Light Makes the Baby Go Blind, one video, and a recording of Jokes and their Relation to the Unconscious, a play described as an attempt to destroy comedy by analyzing it to death.

In 2008 the New York Neo-Futurists put on (Not) Just a Day Like Any Other, four autobiographical stories woven together with accompanying Bollywood music videos, relationships charted via PowerPoint, and margaritas for all.

In November 2016, Greg Allen announced in an emailed press release that he intended to revoke the Chicago company's rights to perform TMLMTBGB. Allen had ceased to be a member of the performing ensemble four years prior, and in his announcement he stated his intention to form a new company to perform the show as a way to "combat the new Trump administration." In a response statement, the Neo-Futurists stated that they were "disappointed that it has come to this conclusion," but that "throughout our long history with Greg there have been considerable artistic differences and irreconcilable personal conflicts." Additionally, a former artistic director and ensemble member disputed Allen's claim that the split was motivated by external politics, citing instead ongoing personality conflicts. The last show took place on December 31, 2016, making TMLMTBGB one of the longest running productions in Chicago history. In solidarity with the Chicago company, the New York and San Francisco productions of Too Much Light also closed that December.

Subsequently, the Neo-Futurists developed and opened a new weekly late-night show in 2017 titled The Infinite Wrench in all three branches to continue to showcase their two-minute plays. The Chicago ensemble notably reached their 10,000th play on September 29, 2017. A fourth branch, operating in London as Degenerate Fox, runs the similar show The Dirty Thirty.

== Notable members ==
- Ayun Halliday
- Chisa Hutchinson
- Desiree Burch
- Dylan Marron
- Greg Kotis
- Jackson Bird
- John Pierson
- Kate Jones
- Lusia Strus
- Michael Cyril Creighton
- Roberta Colindrez
- Spencer Kayden
- Stephen Colbert auditioned for the Neo-Futurists, and was cast as part of the ensemble, but never got an opportunity to perform with them.

The podcast Welcome to Night Vale was created by former New York Neo-Futurists Jeffrey Cranor and Joseph Fink, and has featured many current and former members in its cast including Burch, Marron, and Jones in recurring roles.

== Theater locations ==
- Chicago
- New York: Asylum NYC
- San Francisco
- London: Rosemary Branch Theatre

== Accolades ==
The Neo-Futurists have been recognized in the Chicago Reader Best of Chicago polls. From 2021 through 2024, The Neo-Futurist Theater won first place for best off-Loop theater company, and from 2021 through 2025, they placed third or higher for best established theater company. Additionally, they were awarded second place in 2020 and first in 2021 and 2022 for best original digital content for The Infinite Wrench Goes Viral, which also won first place for best virtual play in 2020. Chicago’s The Infinite Wrench also received second place in 2020 for best long-running play.

In 2011, the New York Neo-Futurists produced an original piece, "Locker 4173b," wherein Neo-Futurists Joey Rizzolo and Christopher Borg purchased a foreclosed storage locker and, as amateur archaeologists, excavated, catalogued, and chronicled their findings. The show received critical acclaim and received a New York Innovative Theater Award for Outstanding Performance Art Production in 2011.

The New York Neo-Futurists were also New York Innovative Theatre Awards recipients for 'Outstanding Performance Art Production' in 2006, 2011, & 2017, 'Outstanding Ensemble' in 2009, and the Caffe Cino Award 2010. They also have been nominated for two Drama Desk awards in 2012 and 2014. In 2009 the New York company won the Village Voice Readers’ Choice poll for Best Performance Art and was named one of the nytheatre.com People of the Year.

The San Francisco Neo-Futurists have been referred to as “SF’s premiere performance art troupe” by 48 Hills, and they were recommended by the San Francisco Chronicle as one of the top things to do in 2022. From 2016 to 2019 and in 2022 and 2023, the SF Neos were runners up or winners of Best Theater Company in the San Francisco Bay Guardian’s Best of the Bay polls. Similarly, they were recognized as the winners of Best Live Theater in SF Weekly’s Best of San Francisco poll in 2017.

== Logo gallery ==
The New York Neo-Futurists logo

SF Neo-Futurists logo
