= Too Much Light Makes the Baby Go Blind =

Theater production

Too Much Light Makes the Baby Go Blind: 30 Plays in 60 Minutes (Too Much Light or TML) is an experimental theatrical production created by Greg Allen and originally performed by the Neo-Futurist collective which Allen co-founded. TML opened in 1988 and was the longest running show in the history of theater in Chicago and was the only open-run Off-Off-Broadway show in New York.

Opening in Chicago December 2, 1988, the show ran 50 weekends of the year through 2016. As its subtitle states, TML consists of 30 original short plays performed in 60 minutes. All were written, directed, and performed by an ensemble. The plays tend to be a mixture of autobiography, performance art, and living newspaper.

== History ==
Neo-Futurism as an aesthetic, as well as the format of TML, are both creations of Neo-Futurist Founding Director Greg Allen. The Neo-Futurism aesthetic is an updating of the early 20th century Italian Futurism movement with influences from Fluxus, Dada, Surrealism, Brecht, Boal, and performance art. Greg Allen came up with the name from a case study of a young autistic child who would smash light bulbs and repeat, "Too much light makes the baby go blind. Too much light makes the baby go blind." Later, when he was creating this show, the saying came back to his mind.

Subsequent productions were staged by branches of the Neo-Futurists in New York (1995-1998, 2004-2016), San Francisco (2013-2016), and Montreal (2007-2012). A London production was staged in 2016 as part of plans for a permanent UK-based ensemble.

From 1990 to 2014, numerous volumes of plays from the show have been published. The book "Too Much Light Makes the Baby Go Blind: 90 Plays from the First 25 Years" published by Playscripts has been produced all over the world with over 100 productions a year.

In November 2016, Allen revoked the Chicago Neo-Futurists' rights to perform Too Much Light in a public announcement citing his desire to use his "most effective artistic vehicle...to combat the Trump administration and all of its cohorts." Allen's revocation of the performance rights did not extend to the New York, San Francisco, and London branches of the Neo-Futurists. However, in solidarity with the Chicago branch, the New York and San Francisco branches ended their runs of Too Much Light. All three ensembles continue to develop and perform their own two-minute plays in a late night show called The Infinite Wrench, which premiered in 2017, while the London ensemble Degenerate Fox performs the similar show The Dirty Thirty.

Allen subsequently co-founded with Christina Killmar the Detroit-based UnTheatre Company, which produced Too Much Light sporadically until 2024.

== Tone of the show ==
The show is the work of the Neo-Futurism movement, a variant of the Italian Futurism movement and reflects their aesthetic of non-illusory theater, where, as Allen states it, "all of our plays are 'set' on the stage in front of the audience. All of our 'characters' are ourselves... We do not aim to 'suspend the audience's disbelief' but to create a world where the stage is a continuation of daily life."

== Structure ==
The structure of TML since 1988 has remained consistent: a random ticket price for the show is determined by the roll of a die with a fixed amount (currently $9 for the Detroit show) being added for each person. Upon payment, a member of the ensemble wearing noise-canceling headphones asks "What's your name?" of the audience member before giving them a name tag with an erroneous or approximate "name" on it. Audience members are then given a "menu" of the play titles for that evening from which the plays are selected by audience members calling out their number - the first number heard by the ensemble being the play performed. Plays begin with the word "Go!" and end when a member of the cast calls "Curtain!" Many of the plays contain elements of randomness and audience interaction. The list of plays is perpetually rotating. Every week between two and twelve plays (determined by two rolls of a die by someone in the audience) are removed from the "menu" and replaced with new plays, written and staged over the course of the week.

As part of an interactive tradition, when a particular evening sells out, the cast orders pizza from a local restaurant, allowing the audience to order toppings. "When we sell out, we order out!" Only a single pizza is ordered, however, which the entire audience must share.
