= Chupacabra (disambiguation) =

The chupacabra is a blood-sucking cryptid.

Chupacabra may also refer to:

== Fictional characters ==
- El Chupacabra, a character in the Disney film Planes
- El Chupacabra (Fransisco Vasquez), a comic character from Invincible

== Film and television ==
- "Chupacabra" (Grimm), an episode of the television series Grimm
- "Chupacabra" (The Walking Dead), an episode of the television series The Walking Dead
- Chupacabra: Dark Seas, a 2005 sci-fi horror film

== Music ==
- Chupacabra (album), a 1997 album by Imani Coppola
- Chupacabras (album), a 2005 album by Phideaux Xavier
- El Chupacabra (EP), a 1998 album by Soil
- "Chupacabras" (song), by Super Furry Animals from Radiator, 1997

== Other uses ==
- Chupacabra (roller coaster), a steel roller coaster located at Six Flags Fiesta Texas amusement park in San Antonio, Texas, U.S.
- Chupacabras (cycling race), an annual bicycle race in Ciudad Juárez, Mexico
- El Chupacabra (restaurant), a restaurant in Seattle, Washington, U.S.
- Chupacabra (チュパカブラ, Chupakabura), a tourism mascot of fictional rural town in the anime Sakura Quest
  - Chupakabura Kingdom, a micronation in which the story took place

== See also ==
- Elmendorf Beast, the name given to a coyote blamed for several attacks on livestock in Elmendorf, Texas, which some local people linked it the legend of the chupacabra
- Nightjar or goatsucker (the English translation of chupacabra), a medium-sized nocturnal or crepuscular bird
