= Inunaki Village =

Japanese urban legend

The Inunaki Village (Japanese: 犬鳴村, Hepburn: Inunaki-mura; lit. 'Howling Village') is a 1990s Japanese urban legend about a fictional village-sized micronation that rejects the Constitution of Japan. The legend locates the village near the Inunaki mountain pass in Fukuoka Prefecture. A real Inunaki Village, not connected to the legend, did exist from 1691 to 1889.

== Legend ==
The village is described as "small and easy to miss" in a forest located in Fukuoka Prefecture, to the east of the Inunaki Mountain next to the most upstream tributary of Inunaki Gawa and the western edge of Wakamiya. The residents of the village refused to accept the Constitution of Japan and the legitimacy of the extant Japanese government. Near the village entrance is a handwritten sign reading: "The Japanese constitution is not in effect past here." A small side road past Old Inunaki Tunnel leads toward the village. According to the legend, "sometime in the early 1970s" a young couple on their way to Hisayama by car went into the forest seeking help when their car's engine broke down. They entered the seemingly-abandoned Inunaki Village, where a "crazy old man" greeted them and then murdered them with a sickle.

In another story, a telephone booth near the Inunaki bridge receives a call from Inunaki Village every night. People answering the call are transported to the village, and die from a curse that causes them to first lose control of their body and mind.

== The real Inunaki Village ==
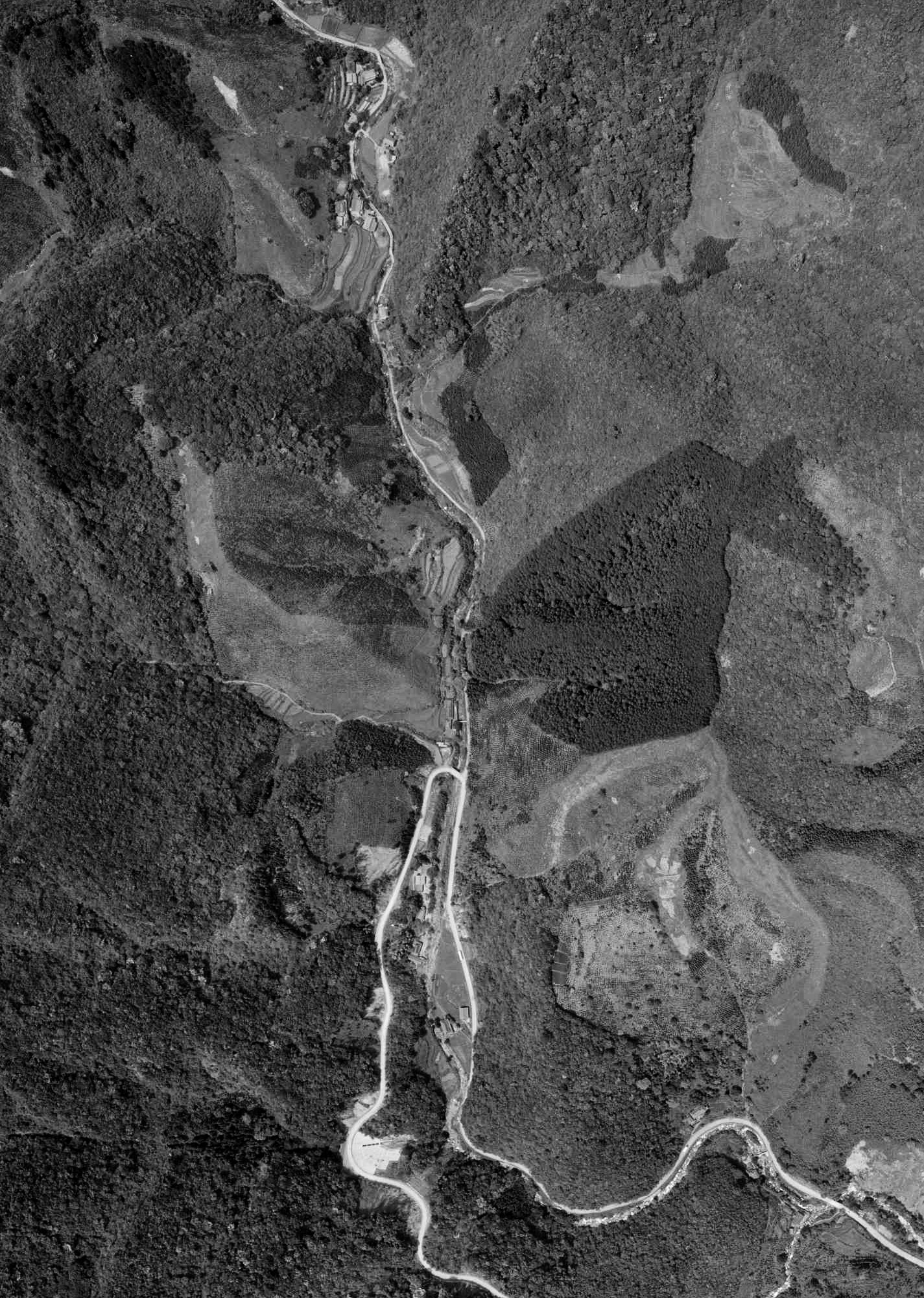
An aerial photo of Inunakidani before the construction of Inunaki Dam

According to Edo Period historical records, the real Inunaki Village (33°41′25″N 130°33′30″E), officially referred to as Inunakidani Village (犬鳴谷村), was established by a dispatch group of the Fukuoka Domain in 1691. Bunnai Shinozaki was appointed as the village headman. The village exported ceramic products and steel. A coal mine was added later. The Inunaki Gobekkan castle was founded in 1865 under the recommendation of Kato Shisho.

In April 1889, Inunakidani was integrated into the nearby Yoshikawa Village with the introduction of the town and village system (町村制, Chosonsei). Subsequent amalgamations eventually created the city of Miyawaka. The Inunaki Dam, completed in 1994, submerged the site of Inunakidani in 1986. Residents of the village were relocated to Wakita.

== Origin and spread ==
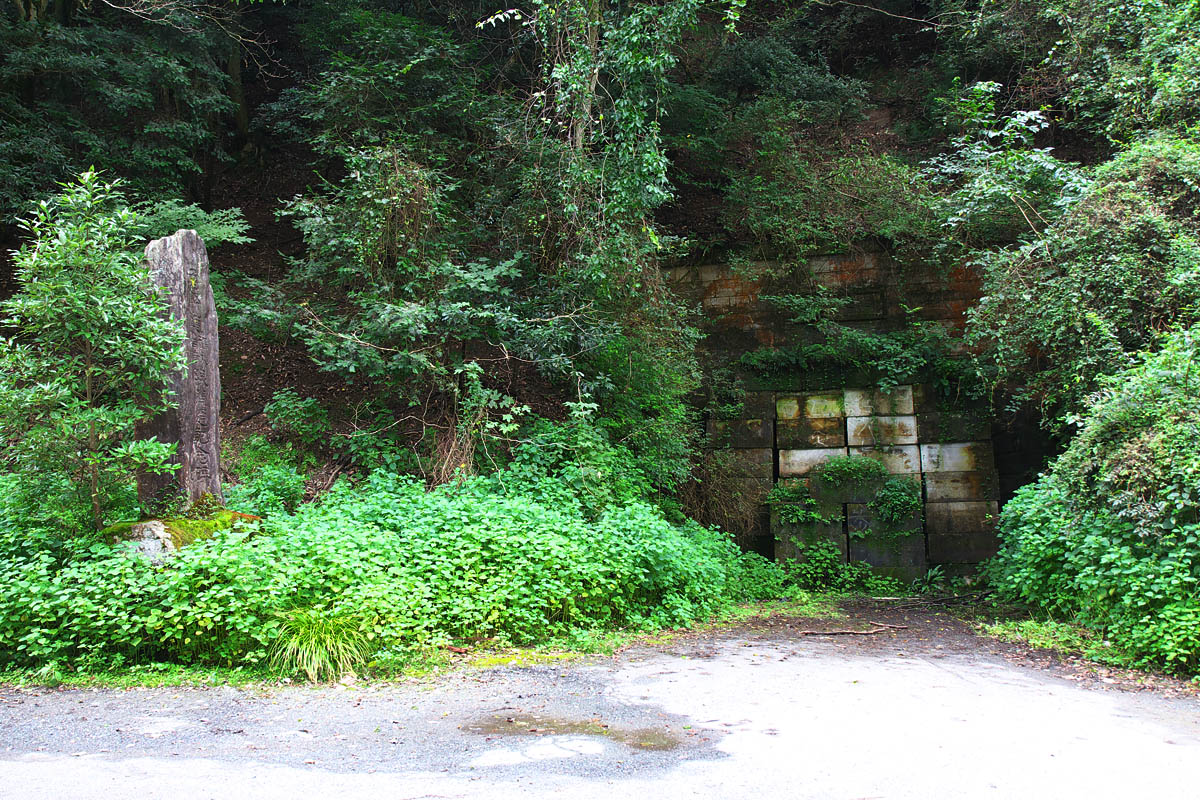
A sealed-off entrance to the Old Inunaki Tunnel

The area of the Old Inunaki Tunnel has been considered to be haunted due to nearby murders. The tunnel's construction was completed in 1949. A new tunnel was constructed nearby in 1975. The unused old tunnel became dangerous due to a lack of maintenance. On 6 December 1988, five young men abducted and tortured a factory worker whose car they wanted to steal, burning him to death with gasoline inside the old tunnel. The perpetrators were arrested and sentenced to life imprisonment. The entrances to the old tunnel were sealed. In 2000, a dead body was found in a nearby dam.

The first online mentions of the Inunaki Village urban legend date back to 1999, when Nippon TV received a letter from an anonymous person, which described the legend of the couple murdered in the village and urged the Nippon TV crew to visit the place. The anonymous letter was titled "The Village in Japan That Isn't Part of Japan".

== In popular culture ==
The legend of Inunaki Village inspired several pieces of media. A horror film Howling Village (犬鳴村) directed by Takashi Shimizu, based on the legend, was released in February 2019. The release of the film contributed to the popularity of the Old Inunaki Tunnel, leading to an increase in trespassing and vandalism in the area. In November of the same year, a horror game titled Inunaki Tunnel was released on Steam. The story also inspired a 2016 anime television series The Lost Village (迷家-マヨイガ-) and The Story of the Mysterious Tunnel (トンネルの奇譚) manga by Junji Ito.

== See also ==
- Oniontown, New York, a community partially known for the historically off-putting demeanor of its residents towards outsiders
