= Highway of Tears (disambiguation) =

The Highway of Tears is a section of road in Canada notorious for crimes against women.

Highway of Tears may also refer to:

- Highway of Tears (film), 2015 Canadian documentary film
- "Highway of Tears" (Grimm), 2014 television episode

== See also ==
- Trail of Tears
