= Tribunal (disambiguation) =

A tribunal is a generic term for any body acting judicially.

Tribunal or The Tribunal may also refer to:

== Places ==
- Tribunal (Madrid Metro), a railway station in Madrid, Spain
- The Tribunal, Glastonbury, a historic building in Somerset, England

== Television ==
- Tribunal (TV series), a 1963–1964 Australian historical drama anthology series
- "Tribunal" (Grimm), an episode
- "Tribunal" (The Outer Limits), an episode
- "Tribunal" (Star Trek: Deep Space Nine), an episode
- Animated Alias: Tribunal, a 2003 American animated short film produced for the DVD release of the third season of Alias
- The Tribunal (Metalocalypse), a fictional organization in the TV series Metalocalypse

== Other uses ==
- Tribunal (Guardians of Time), a fictional organization in the Guardians of Time novel trilogy
- Tribunal Records, an American record label
- The Tribunal (professional wrestling), a 2013–2016 professional wrestling tag-team
- The Elder Scrolls III: Tribunal, an expansion to the video game The Elder Scrolls III: Morrowind
