= Sakura Quest =

Japanese anime television series

- Promotional image featuring the main characters (from left to right): Ririko Oribe, Shiori Shinomiya, Yoshino Koharu, Sanae Kōzuki and Maki Midorikawa.

サクラクエスト (Sakura Kuesuto)
- Anime television series
- Directed by: Sōichi Masui
- Produced by: Masaya Saitou; Hiroyuki Kobayashi; Shōji Sōma
- Written by: Masahiro Yokotani
- Music by: Makoto Miyazaki ([K]NoW_NAME)
- Studio: P.A. Works
- Licensed by: Crunchyroll: SEA: Medialink
- Original network: Tokyo MX, AT-X, ABC, BS11, TUT
- English network: SEA: Animax Asia
- Original run: April 5, 2017 – September 20, 2017
- Episodes: 25
- icon

Sakura Quest (Japanese: サクラクエスト, Hepburn: Sakura Kuesuto) is a 25-episode Japanese anime television series produced by P.A. Works and directed by Sōichi Masui. It aired from April 5 to September 20, 2017. The anime is described as part of P.A. Works' "working series", which tells the stories about people and their jobs, after Hanasaku Iroha and Shirobako.

== Plot ==
Yoshino Koharu is a young woman looking for a job in Tokyo but is only met with a series of rejections. However, she has a seemingly lucky break when she receives a job offer to work with the tourism board of the economically struggling Manoyama village as their "Queen". With no other choice, Yoshino accepts the offer and travels to Manoyama only to find out that she was hired based on a case of mistaken identity and that her contract term is for one year instead of the one day, as she had initially thought. With nowhere else to go, Yoshino reluctantly becomes Queen of Manoyama.

== Characters ==
Yoshino Koharu (木春由乃, Koharu Yoshino)
Voiced by: Ayaka Nanase (Japanese); Alexis Tipton (English)
The main protagonist. She grew up in a rural area in Japan and went to college in Tokyo in hopes of landing a job in the city, but after failing to land a job she gets an offer to work for the tourism department of Manoyama village, which runs a micronation called the Chupacabra Kingdom. She had actually visited Manoyama as a child and was treated as a queen during her visit. At the end of the series, she leaves Manoyama as the tourism board has decided to disband the Chupacabra Kingdom.
Shiori Shinomiya (四ノ宮しおり, Shinomiya Shiori)
Voiced by: Reina Ueda (Japanese); Tia Ballard (English)
A native of Manoyama and member of the tourism board, Shiori is a friendly and kindhearted woman who wants to see the town improve and acts as Yoshino's guide.
Maki Midorikawa (緑川真希, Midorikawa Maki)
Voiced by: Chika Anzai (Japanese); Leah Clark (English)
An amateur actor and local celebrity in Manoyama, Maki is famed for a bit part she played in a television series called the Oden Detective.
Ririko Oribe (織部凛々子, Oribe Ririko)
Voiced by: Chiemi Tanaka (Japanese); Brina Palencia (English)
Ririko is the granddaughter of the local sweets shop owner and is a fan of the occult.
Sanae Kōzuki (香月早苗, Kōzuki Sanae)
Voiced by: Mikako Komatsu (Japanese); Elizabeth Maxwell (English)
A web entrepreneur, Sanae is a Tokyo native who moved to Manoyama to escape city life.
Ushimatsu Kadota (門田丑松, Kadota Ushimatsu)
Voiced by: Atsushi Ono, Takuya Eguchi (young) (Japanese); Mark Stoddard, Ian Ferguson (young) (English)
The grouchy head of Manoyama's tourism board and the King of the town. He acts as Yoshino's direct superior. He was in a band with Chitose and Dokushima during his youth and planned to leave Manoyama, but stayed after an incident during the town's festival.
Chitose Oribe (織部千登勢, Oribe Chitose)
Voiced by: Maki Izawa, Yoko Hikasa (young) (Japanese); Rachel Robinson, Carli Mosier (young) (English)
Ririko's grandmother who runs a sweets shop. She was in a band with Ushimatsu and Dokushima during her youth.
Dokushima (毒島)
Voiced by: Kazuhiro Yamaji, Yōji Ueda (young) (Japanese); Charles Campbell, Mike McFarland (young) (English)
Manoyama's local mechanic and eccentric inventor, and owner of the Dokushima Workshop. He was in band with Ushimatsu and Chitose during his youth.
Takamizawa (高見沢)
Voiced by: Katsuyuki Konishi (Japanese); Robert McCollum, Steph Garrett (young) (English)
Manoyama's sole bus driver.
Kindaichi (金田一)
Voiced by: Masashi Nogawa, Minami Kabayama (young) (Japanese); Cris George, Ryan Reynolds (young) (English)
A police officer of Manoyama who is friends with Takamizawa and Noge when they were young.
Noge (野毛)
Voiced by: Yōji Ueda, Ruriko Aoki (young) (Japanese); J. Michael Tatum, Howard Wang (young) (English)
A lover of books who fulfilled his childhood dream of owning his own bookshop when the owner of his favorite bookstore retired and agreed to sell it to him. Noge wants to have a business that sells books of all kinds, but with declining birth rates and internet sales hurting his business he is forced to limit his stock to magazines and best sellers.
Kinoshita (木下)
Voiced by: Kohsuke Toriumi (Japanese); Orion Pitts (English)
Kinoshita is a member of a rock band called Ptolemaios with his bandmates Tokichiro and Hideyoshi. Later, he performs a live concert at Manoyama's Founding Festival per the request of Yukiya Amamiya, a director of a docuseries that focuses on exceptional locals.
Yamada (山田)
Voiced by: Hiro Shimono (Japanese); Dallas Reid (English)
A redheaded member of the tourism board.
Mino (美濃)
Voiced by: Daiki Hamano (Japanese); Aaron Roberts (English)
A darkhaired member of the tourism board.
Mr. Sandal (サンダルさん, Sandaru-san)
Voiced by: Vinay Murthy (Japanese); Jerry Jewell (English)
The town street musician and vagabond artist, whose real name is Alexandre Cena Davis Celibidache.
Tomoko Suzuki (鈴木 知子, Suzuki Tomoko) / Angelica (アンジェリカ, Anjerika)
Voiced by: Nanako Mori (Japanese); Colleen Clinkenbeard (English)
Tomoko is the mother of Erika and Anji and an inhabitant of Manoyama who is a restaurant owner and a fortune teller specializing in stroke reading and using the crystal ball.
Erika Suzuki (鈴木エリカ, Suzuki Erika)
Voiced by: Tomoyo Kurosawa (Japanese); Jill Harris (English)
Erika is the daughter of Tomoko and the older sister of Anji. She has a crush on Kosuke, Maki's younger brother.
Anji Suzuki (鈴木 杏志, Suzuki Anji)
Voiced by: Yuiko Tatsumi (Japanese); Sarah Wiedenheft (English)
Anji is the son of Tomoko and the younger brother of Erika. He wants to play the taiko drums when he grows up after being inspired by Kosuke.

== Broadcast and distribution ==
Sakura Quest is directed by Sōichi Masui and produced by P.A. Works. It ran for 25 episodes and it aired in Japan from April 5 to September 20, 2017, on Tokyo MX, with further broadcasts on ABC, AT-X, BS11, and Tulip TV. Alexandre S. D. Celibidache is credited with the original work, and the screenplay was written by Masahiro Yokotani. Kanami Sekiguchi based the character design used in the anime on Bunbun's original designs. The music is produced by the band (K)NoW_NAME, who also perform the opening and ending themes. The first opening theme is "Morning Glory" and the first ending theme is "Freesia". The second opening theme is "Lupinus" and the second ending theme is "Baby's Breath". The anime is licensed by Funimation in North America with an English dub, and the series was streamed by Crunchyroll with English subtitles.

No.	Title (Note: All English titles are taken from Crunchyroll.)	Original air date
1	"Off to Magical Manoyama"; Transliteration: "Ma no Yama e" (Japanese: 魔の山へ)	April 5, 2017
Yoshino Koharu has little luck in finding a job in Tokyo before she graduates from junior college. She finally receives a job offer to act as a queen for the rural village of Manoyama. Despite having moved out of a rural town to enjoy the city life in Tokyo, Yoshino decides to accept the job, only to find out from Ushimatsu Kadota that Yamada hired her based on mistaken identity of a similarly named late pop star. While being given a tour by Shiori Shinomiya, Yoshino realizes that Manoyama is in recession just like her hometown. Mino explains that Manoyama runs a micronation called the Chupakabura Kingdom. During the coronation ceremony, Kadota crowns Yoshino as the new queen. After Shiori drives her to the cabin, Yoshino meets Maki Midorikawa. As a result of failing to read her contract, Yoshino is informed that she must take up residence in Manoyama as the queen for one year, not just for one day as she had initially thought. Yoshino tries to leave the town at night, though she encounters Shiori and accidentally injures Kadota dressed as the chupacabra mascot named the Chupakabura. Upon being locked out of the cabin, Yoshino spends the night inside the Chupakabura Kingdom, discovering that she was the town's 100,000th guest during childhood. The next morning, Yoshino receives a rejection from her final job application, reluctantly accepting her position as the queen of Manoyama.
2	"The Gathering of the Five Champions"; Transliteration: "Tsudoishi Gonin no Yūshatachi" (Japanese: 集いし五人の勇者たち)	April 12, 2017
Kadota challenges Yoshino to sell a thousand boxes of manjū with the face of the Chupakabura within a week in order to nullify her contract. Maki is revealed to be an amateur actor who played a supporting role in a detective television series. Yoshino and Shiori stop by the restaurant Angelica owned by Tomoko Suzuki, who is also a fortune teller. At a sweets shop, Yoshino and Shiori visit Ririko Oribe, who explains the legend of the chupacabra. Yoshino and Shiori recruit Sanae Kōzuki to design an occult themed website advertising the manjū. After finding out that Sanae used to live in Tokyo before residing in Manoyama, Yoshino contemplates her perspective of city life. Although the website gets up and running, only three boxes are sold. Maki then suggests filming a commercial, while Shiori invites Ririko over to be the camerawoman. The commercial depicts Yoshino dressed as a knight to save Shiori and Sanae dressed as villagers and slay Maki dressed as the Chupakabura before advertising the manjū. Despite their best efforts, they only sell one more box to Mr. Sandal. As the deadline passes, Yoshino, Shiori, Maki, Ririko and Sanae dejectedly decide to eat some of the unsold manjū, in which Sanae admits that she had fun collaborating with the others. Yoshino expresses her desire to view the cherry blossoms with the others. Although Shiori points out that the cherry blossoms will not be in full bloom for another two weeks, Yoshino decides to stay in Manoyama until then.
3	"The Cry of the Mandrake"; Transliteration: "Mandoreiku no Sakebi" (Japanese: マンドレイクの叫び)	April 19, 2017
Shiori considers rooming with Yoshino and Maki at the cabin. After participating in a televised interview at the Chupakabura Kingdom, Yoshino realizes that she knows little about the history of Manoyama. Despite her effort to reinvigorate Manoyama, Yoshino is dismayed when Noge and Kindaichi both confirm that the townspeople are completely apathetic to bringing change. After speaking with Takamizawa, Yoshino learns that Manoyama used to be famous for its turnips by marketing a short-lived turnip mascot named the Kabura Kid before Kadota changed the mascot to The Chupakabura. Yoshino and Kadota later prepare to participate in a regional mascot contest, but Kadota previously misplaced the Chupakabura mask in the garbage. Thanks to an idea from Chitose Oribe, Ririko informs Shiori, Maki and Sanae that they must locate and repair the discarded Kabura Kid costume. Kadota is left feeling indecisive when Shiori, Maki, Ririko and Sanae deliver the patched-up Kabura Kid mask, while Yamada and Mino deliver the filthy Chupakabura mask. In a bidding strategy, Yoshino makes Kadota wear the Kabura Kid mask with the Chupakabura suit before they enter the stage. Yoshino gives a sincere speech about how the Kabura Kid and the Chupakabura were both forgotten, vowing to discover the answer to what is important to the townspeople of Manoyama. Afterwards, Kadota allows Yoshino to officially enlist Shiori, Maki, Ririko and Sanae to be her "ministers".
4	"The Lone Alchemist"; Transliteration: "Kokō no Arukemisuto" (Japanese: 孤高のアルケミスト)	April 26, 2017
Yoshino, Shiori, Maki and Ririko help Sanae pack up her belongings to move out of her bug-infested house and into the cabin. When the pickup truck breaks down, they take it to Dokushima, who owns a workshop. Dokushima also lends them a prototype powered exoskeleton to assist in moving the boxes. Wanting to use the local wood-carving district to promote the town, Yoshino, Shiori, Maki, Ririko and Sanae briefly visit two wood carvers named Tatsuo and Kazushi. After a lot of brainstorming, Yoshino wants to meld tradition with modern-day technology by decorating the powered exoskeleton with wood carvings, something that Tatsuo thinks is innovative. Unfortunately, this design proves to be impractical due to its sharp edges. Sanae then has the idea to combine Dokushima's transforming vending machine with a wood carving of a Buddha statue, while Dokushima is working on a sushi-infused soda. However, this project angers Kazushi, who sticks to tradition, as well as Chitose, who is head of the merchant board, leaving Yoshino unsure about the next course of action. Yoshino accompanies Sanae to see Kazushi, who believes that Sanae came to Manoyama as a way of escape. At the park, Sanae confides in Yoshino that she left Tokyo because she was tired of overworking herself, realizing that the world is perfectly capable of turning on its own with or without her help. Sanae leaves after saying that she does not have the motivation to continue being a minister for Yoshino.
5	"The Budding Yggdrasil"; Transliteration: "Yugudorashiru no Mebae" (Japanese: ユグドラシルの芽生え)	May 3, 2017
Yoshino, Shiori, Maki and Ririko rigorously study about wood carving. At the train station, Sanae runs into Tatsuo coming back from a wake, where he alludes to Cinderella for losing his shoes while catching a train. During a meeting, Yoshino, Shiori, Maki and Ririko discuss that wood carvings have shifted with the trend of the era, from Buddha statues to shop signs to transom. Yoshino has the idea to build a basilica made out of wood carvings and based on the Sagrada Família called the "Sakura Pond Família". However, Kadota blatantly points out that it would require a sufficient amount of funding to build such a structure. At Angelica, Tatsuo showcases a pair of wooden high-heeled shoes for Sanae to review. After Yoshino manages to convince Mr. Sandal to create a sketch of the Sakura Pond Família, she enlists Shiori, Maki and Ririko to get the word across. Later on, Sanae returns to the cabin with the pair of wooden high-heel shoes that Tatsuo designed. Yoshino tells Sanae that people individually can yield different results in the same field of work. With a renewed sense of motivation, Sanae takes the first steps to make the Sakura Pond Família a reality. Starting small, Sanae suggests to install Kazushi's transom in the waiting room of the train station for visitors to see, while planning to promote a line of modern wood-carved products like Tatsuo's high-heel shoes.
6	"The Rural Masquerade"; Transliteration: "Den'en no Masukarēdo" (Japanese: 田園のマスカレード)	May 10, 2017
The tourism board prepares for the arrival of a film crew to do location shooting in Manoyama. Yoshino, Shiori and Sanae reluctantly decide to help the film crew after learning from third assistant director Fujiwara that there is a staff shortage and a low budget for the film production of a zombie film. Moreover, it is mentioned that the film director is prone to constantly changing the plot. Meanwhile, Maki decides not to be involved as a stagehand and hangs out with her younger brother Kosuke Midorikawa, whom Erika Suzuki has a crush on. As the film director arrives, he requests to have a derelict house burned down for the final scene, making Shiori feeling uncomfortable. Shiori receives permission from the homeowner's next of kin to film the scene, but she falters from telling the other tourism board members about this. During principal photography, Fujiwara introduces Taiga Hayama as the main male lead and Moe Sawano as the heroine. Kadota is cast as an extra in a zombie scene. Fujiwara later informs Yoshino that a stand-in is needed after a minor actress got injured while hiking. Yoshino asks Maki to take on the role, but Maki angrily storms off. Sanae rushes to confront Maki, only to realize that Maki is already acquainted with Moe. After learning that Maki lacks the drive to become a successful actress, Sanae chastises Maki for rejecting her passion for acting and urges her to apologize to Yoshino.
7	"The Mansion in Purgatory"; Transliteration: "Rengoku no Yakata" (Japanese: 煉獄の館)	May 17, 2017
Ririko struggles to perform as a stand-in for a scene with Moe until being discreetly coached by Maki. Yoshino is dismayed upon learning that the indoor scenes need to be filmed ahead of schedule. She later confronts Shiori for lying about not receiving permission to have the derelict house burned down for the final scene, though Shiori runs off after admitting that the derelict house holds a lot of her childhood memories. Maki manages to book twenty elementary schoolchildren as "mini-zombies", thanks to Kosuke contacting their father Iwao Midorikawa, who is the vice principal. Maki previously told Ririko that acting is just living in an imaginary situation. After another scene is filmed, Yoshino apologizes for confronting Shiori earlier about the derelict house, though Shiori understands that it was never her decision to make. At Angelica, Kosuke shows an old video that Iwao filmed when Maki was a tree for a school play. During the last day of filming, the film director believes that Moe should leap towards the derelict house while it is in flames to reunite with Taiga. Though Fujiwara is against this dangerous course of action, Maki volunteers to be a double, which reignites her passion for acting. The final scene is a success as filming wraps up. Shiori discovers from Fujiwara that Yoshino petitioned to have the homeowner, a deceased woman named Miyo Yasuda, featured in the closing credits. At the cabin, Yoshino, Shiori, Maki, Ririko and Sanae celebrate over beer.
8	"The Fairy's Recipe"; Transliteration: "Yōsei no Reshipi" (Japanese: 妖精のレシピ)	May 24, 2017
Yoshino, Maki, Ririko and Sanae arrive in various sun protective clothing, hoping to help Shiori harvest crops for her mother Chikako Shinomiya and father Takayuki Shinomiya. Shiori's older sister Sayuri Shinomiya works as a pediatric nurse practitioner in a neighboring town, planning to move there for an easier commute. Yoshino wants to organize the C-Rank Gourmet, an event to create a signature dish that will attract visiting tourists, though Yoshino, Shiori, Maki, Ririko and Sanae fail to come up with an appealing signature dish. As Shiori eats dinner at a French restaurant named Bistro L'Ours with Sayuri and their parents as well as their grandmother Chiyo Shinomiya and grandfather Ganjuro Shinomiya, they all meet Katsumi Kumano, Sayuri's high school classmate who went to cooking school in France and became the head chef of Bistro L'Ours. The next day, Yoshino, Shiori, Maki, Ririko and Sanae hang out with Kumano. He makes a list of seasonal ingredients for them, though they seem to miss the mark on a possible signature dish again. After having a conversation with Takayuki about the future, Shiori learns that Sayuri and Kumano never realized that they had crushes on each other in high school. Chitose later confronts Yoshino, pointing out that the tourism board's C-Rank Gourmet is scheduled on the same day as the merchant board's annual Summer Festival. As Yoshino apologizes to Chitose for this oversight, Shiori assures that she has a plan that will benefit both the tourism board and the merchant board.
9	"The Lady's Scales"; Transliteration: "Shukujo no Tenbin" (Japanese: 淑女の天秤)	May 31, 2017
Upon noticing that both Takamizawa and Mr. Sandal love eating sōmen, Shiori proposes an idea for the Manoyama Sōmen Mega Expo, in which local participants compete in creating a signature dish with a sōmen theme. Chitose has no objections since sōmen is a local staple food. Yoshino and Kadota commission Dokushima to develop a sōmen processing machine. Shiori, Maki, Ririko and Sanae learn that Kumano wanted to impress Sayuri by perfecting the French toast. Sayuri encounters Kumano when she prepares to move out. While Kumano wonders why Sayuri never showed up at the train station to see him off before he left for France, she replied that she never saw him there despite waiting a long time. The tourism board samples some onigiri wrapped in kombu from the local cuisine society. Shiori is overjoyed to see a huge turnout for the Manoyama Sōmen Mega Expo. She creates a "Happy Sōmen" recipe, combining sōmen and kombu into one dish. Yoshino showcases the "Overflowing Sōmen 5DX", an sōmen processing machine and interactive arcade game. Although Shiori does not win the Manoyama Sōmen Mega Expo, her recipe still proves to be very popular. At the Chupakabura Kingdom, Kumano clears up the confusion when Sayuri realizes that she accidentally referenced an outdated calendar, meaning that she went to the train station on the wrong day. With the Manoyama Sōmen Mega Expo deemed a success, Tomoko serves Takamizawa the Happy Sōmen at Angelica.
10	"The Dragon's Soft Spot"; Transliteration: "Doragon no Gekirin" (Japanese: ドラゴンの逆鱗)	June 7, 2017
Kadota tasks Yoshino to organize a matchmaking tour for the local community club called "Rural Romance in Manoyama", where three young urban women have been invited to look for potential suitors. Yoshino, Shiori, Maki, Ririko and Sanae drive around town in hopes of creating an itinerary. When the idea of teaching the Manoyama Dance floats around, Yoshino is eager to learn it, though Ririko shows no interest. On the first day of the matchmaking tour, Yoshino and Maki greet the three women named Kiyomi Hiragi, Ayana Nakatsugawa and Izumi Koyama, who are later introduced to the single men of the local community club named Ippei Taira, Kakimura and Shibukawa. Kindaichi is revealed to be the head of the local community club. During a barbecue at Sakura Pond in the evening, Kiyomi, Ayana and Izumi mingle further with Taira, Kakimura and Shibukawa. Yoshino, Shiori, Maki and Sanae perform the Manoyama Dance, with Ririko declining to participate. Kadota explains that the Manoyama Dance was originally created to ward away a mythical dragon that lives in Sakura Pond. A thunderstorm suddenly strikes, forcing everyone to scatter into the woods. Yoshino, Shiori, Kindaichi, Noge and Kiyomi seek shelter in a nearby shrine, accidentally damaging a stone dragon idol amidst the confusion. As an unknown burly man emerges from Sakura Pond, Ririko gets separated from everyone else and takes refuge at a bus stop.
11	"The Forgotten Requiem"; Transliteration: "Bōkyaku no Rekuiemu" (Japanese: 忘却のレクイエム)	June 14, 2017
The next day, Dokushima superglues the stone dragon idol back in place. Yoshino, Shiori, Maki and Sanae discover that someone tracked mud inside the Chupakabura Kingdom. Chitose looks after Ririko, who is bedridden with an apparent cold. The second day of the matchmaking tour begins with a trip to the climbing gym. Ririko relates herself to the legend of the dragon girl, supposedly being ostracized by the villagers. Mr. Sandal reveals that he is a descendant of his foreign great-grandfather and his native great-grandmother. After stopping by Bistro L'Ours for makunouchi, Yoshino, Shiori, Maki and Sanae discuss that Ririko's mother left town and Ririko's father worked overseas after their divorce. At the wood-carving district, more clues allude to Kiyomi being followed by an eerie presence. Ririko informs Yoshino that the dragon girl fearfully hid inside a cave and died alone when the villagers performed a welcoming lively dance around a bonfire, though the villagers wrote a song in remorse to honor her legacy. Mr. Sandal fortunately knows the Dragon's Song, which was passed down from his great-grandmother. At the end of the matchmaking tour, the burly man is actually Kiyomi's ex-boyfriend Masaki Suga. Ririko and Mr. Sandal give an impressive performance of the Dragon's Song as the fireflies light up the sky. The next day, Kiyomi, Ayana, Izumi and Masaki prepare to return home, promising to visit Manoyama again someday. Ririko jokingly points out that Manoyama could be marketed as a hot spot for elopers.
12	"The Dawn Guild"; Transliteration: "Yoake no Girudo" (Japanese: 夜明けのギルド)	June 21, 2017
Yoshino, Shiori, Maki, Ririko and Sanae prepare for the annual Founding Festival. They meet television producer Tomoharu Kume, who introduces them to Yukiya Amamiya, a native of Manoyama and a director of a docuseries that focuses on exceptional locals. Amamiya proposes to film an episode focusing on Yoshino, Shiori, Maki, Ririko and Sanae as the "town revival gals". After collecting statements from Maki, Sanae, Shiori and Ririko, Amamiya is troubled that Yoshino does not have a compelling backstory that would wow the viewers. At the Chupakabura Kingdom, Shiori, Maki, Ririko and Sanae learn that Yoshino was the town's 100,000th guest during childhood, agreeing to keep this a secret. When the tourism board struggles to find sponsors to fund the Founding Festival, Amamiya arrives to give good news that a popular rock band called Ptolemaios will be performing a concert at the Founding Festival, which will be funded by the television network as an official corporate event. Yoshino, Shiori, Maki, Ririko and Sanae try to convince the merchant board and the local community club to distribute coupons to tourists for the local businesses. Despite some disagreements at first, Yoshino garners enough support when Chitose backs her plan. At night, Maki and Sanae shows Yoshino that there are many people camping outside in anticipation for the Ptolemaios concert.
13	"The Marionette's Banquet"; Transliteration: "Marionetto no Kyōen" (Japanese: マリオネットの饗宴)	June 28, 2017
Kinoshita, Tokishiro and Hideyoshi, the band members of Ptolemaios, finally arrive in Manoyama, attracting a massive crowd as the Founding Festival commences. Ririko, Chitose, Tomoko and Kumano set up booths for various merchandise. When Yoshino and Maki host a trivia contest called the "Moneyomania Quiz Extravaganza" with the grand prize being a trip for two to Guam, much of the crowd flocks to attend the Ptolemaios concert, which was delayed due to technical issues. Despite the minor setback of loud music playing nearby, Yoshino and Maki manage to complete the trivia contest and present the grand prize to Mr. Sandal, who chooses Kindaichi as his plus one. The Founding Festival ends successfully with a record of 6,000 attendees. When the episode airs a week later, Amamiya is upset when Kume edited the footage in a way that focused on the Ptolemaios concert instead of the trivia contest, misrepresenting the Founding Festival. The tourism board discusses that only 20 out of 1,000 distributed coupons were redeemed, indicating a slim chance of returning visitors. Realizing that her efforts to revitalize Manoyama was all in vain, a dismayed Yoshino packs her suitcase and leaves for the train station.
14	"The Queen, Convicted"; Transliteration: "Kokuō no Danzai" (Japanese: 国王の断罪)	July 5, 2017
While on vacation, Yoshino returns to her rural hometown called Azumigaura, Sanae visits Tokyo to see her friends and Maki plans to have dinner with Moe. Shiori and Ririko propose to convert the vacant houses of Manoyama into bed and breakfasts. Yoshino catches up with her childhood friend Saku, who works to support new rural residents. As Shiori and Ririko bring up their idea to Tomoko and Kindaichi, Yoshino runs into her younger sister Nagisa Koharu, who invites her to attend the annual Azumi Festival taking place in the evening. Sanae goes out drinking with her friends named Eri Kaneko, Kaoru Arimura and Yuki. As they discuss the complications of startup companies, Sanae proves to be more assertive and grounded. While having dinner together, Moe convinces Maki to apply for an upcoming acting workshop hosted by a famous film director. During the Azumi Festival, Yoshino briefly encounters her childhood friends Yuika, Miyako and Natsuki. After Yoshino learns that her mother Yae Koharu and her father Souichirou Koharu first met during the Azumi Festival years ago, Yoshino regains the resolve to revitalize Manoyama. Having permission from Kadota, both Shiori and Ririko inspect a vacant house, where they chance upon a group of friendly and harmless Spanish travelers. However, Shiori and Ririko are bereft of words since they do not understand Spanish.
15	"The Queen's Return"; Transliteration: "Kokuō no Kikan" (Japanese: 国王の帰還)	July 12, 2017
In the evening, Yoshino, Maki and Sanae carpool back to Manoyama, where they find that the rest of the tourism board members are seen conversing with the Spanish travelers at the Chupakabura Kingdom. Shiori, Ririko and Kadota explain that the Spanish travelers are collectively the "Cryptid Twelve", a group hoping to find the Chupakabura in Manoyama. The next day, it is explained that the Cryptid Twelve wants to witness Sakura Pond being completely drained, a procedure that was previously done seventy years ago, which will take two weeks to finish in order to control the population of black bass. Yoshino, Shiori, Maki, Ririko and Sanae get help from one of the foreigners named Lucia to prepare a vacant house as a bed and breakfast for the Cryptid Twelve. After being shown pictures of Lucia visiting other countries, Ririko wonders what it would be like to leave Manoyama. Yoshino notices when Kadota and Dokushima stand near Sakura Pond, later learning from Dokushima that he was supposedly trading ghost stories with Kadota. At night, Kadota catches sight of something in Sakura Pond, and he nearly drowns after leaping in. However, he is quickly rescued by everyone and admitted to the hospital. Upon returning home, Ririko overhears Chitose being contacted by Dokushima, who warns Chitose about an event that happened fifty years ago. As it begins to rain, Kadota escapes from the hospital, determined to prevent anybody from seeing what is hidden at the bottom of Sakura Pond.
16	"The Harlequin on the Pond"; Transliteration: "Kojō no Arurukan" (Japanese: 湖上のアルルカン)	July 19, 2017
Yoshino, Maki and Sanae find Kadota stricken with pneumonia after he crashes his car trying to pull something out of Sakura Pond. Ririko shows Yoshino, Shiori, Maki and Sanae a picture of Kadota, Chitose and Dokushima in their youth when they formed a rock band. Dokushima confirms that the rock band was formed fifty years ago, with Kadota as the guitarist, Dokushima as the drummer and Chitose as the bassist. In the past, Kadota, Chitose and Dokushima planned to run away from Manoyama to Tokyo during the annual Mizuchi Festival in hopes of advancing their musical careers, but Kadota stayed behind and disrupted the Mizuchi Festival with his woke music, accidentally causing the shrine float to sink into Sakura Pond and discontinuing the Mizuchi Festival altogether. In the present, Chitose later encourages Ririko to follow her dreams while she is still young. As a crowd arrives to observe when Sakura Pond completely dries up, Yoshino, Shiori, Maki, Ririko and Sanae witness the remains of the shrine float. The Cryptid Twelve prepare to continue traveling the world, while Kadota recovers from pneumonia. Yoshino brings up the idea of reviving the Mizuchi Festival. A member of the tourism board named Shigaraki states that Yoshino must find the Staff, the Hanging Drum and the Golden Dragon, which are the three sacred treasures of the Mizuchi Festival. Yoshino takes up the challenge to find these lost items in an effort of making her idea come to fruition.
17	"The Sphinx's Antics"; Transliteration: "Sufinkusu no Tawamure" (Japanese: スフィンクスの戯れ)	July 26, 2017
Yoshino, Shiori, Maki, Ririko and Sanae pursue a lead from Noge, who informs them that an eccentric and elderly cultural anthropologist named Rennosuke Suzuhara living alone in the mountainous Warabiya Village might know the whereabouts of the three sacred treasures of the Mizuchi Festival. Suzuhara sends them on a wild-goose chase when he only hints that one of the sacred treasures is being kept in one of the storehouses, never mentioning that he already has it in his own storehouse. Meanwhile, Takamizawa is confronted by some elderly residents who are disappointed that the bus route from Manoyama to Warabiya Village will be removed. Upon finding no common ground in solving the crisis of the bus route, Yoshino, Shiori, Maki, Ririko and Sanae decide to teach the elderly residents how to proficiently use tablet computers, which would reduce reliance on the bus route and better coordinate with the "treasure hunt". With the plan deemed a success, Sanae makes an informational web series to encourage more active participation from the elderly residents. Shiori, Maki, Ririko and Sanae assist Hide in preventing Shige from picking a fight with Goro for supposedly being a troll. Yoshino is soon taken hostage by Suzuhara at his house, where Suzuhara and the other elderly residents release a video announcing their intention to secede from the Chupakabura Kingdom unless their bus route is reinstated.
18	"Minerva's Sake Saucer"; Transliteration: "Mineruvua no Sakazuki" (Japanese: ミネルヴァの杯)	August 2, 2017
Yoshino voluntarily became a hostage since she supports Suzuhara's "at-home coup d'état", while Maki is momentarily roped into the cause. As Warabiya Village is soon declared a republic, Yoshino, Shiori and Ririko gather mushrooms, while Sanae questions Suzuhara concerning his endgame. Suzuhara aimed to bring awareness of issues to light, while also wanting the elderly residents to post vlogs about their everyday lives as a digital archive. After Yoshino learns that Takamizawa is against the removal of the bus route to Warabiya Village, she spends more time with the elderly residents. Sanae collaborates with Takamizawa to develop a demand-responsive transport for Warabiya Village. The elderly residents can now reserve pickup times and preferred locations via online instead of being limited to a bus route. Suzuhara then formally rescinds his declaration of withdrawal from the Chupakabura Kingdom. Later that night, Suzuhara dies from collapsing on the floor right after he gives an online anonymous tip that one of the sacred treasures is located in his storehouse. After a funeral is held in Suzuhara's honor, Yoshino, Shiori, Maki, Ririko and Sanae find the Staff inside Suzuhara's storehouse, carrying it back to Manoyama in the demand-responsive transport driven by Takamizawa.
19	"The Foggy Folklore"; Transliteration: "Kiri no Fōkuroa" (Japanese: 霧のフォークロア)	August 9, 2017
At night, Yoshino, Shiori, Maki, Ririko and Sanae search for the Hanging Drum at an abandoned middle school. Ririko tells the others about the urban legend of the "Blood-soaked Santa". They suddenly encounter Iwao, who helps them recover the Hanging Drum, though it is in need of repair. The next morning, Yamada and Mino transport the Hanging Drum on a pickup truck to a garage, as Yoshino learns from Shiori that the middle school will be demolished in two years. While promoting the proposed revival of the Mizuchi Festival, Yoshino, Shiori, Sanae and Kadota walk the route of the shrine float procession. They visit Tatsuo at the wood-carving district and pass by Chitose at the sweets shop before arriving at Sakura Pond, where Yoshino learns that Kadota wants to make amends concerning the Mizuchi Festival. Maki stops by her family home to drop off a birthday present for her mother Sumiko Midorikawa. However, Maki prepares to leave after Iwao argues with her about being a college dropout. Kosuke is surprised when Maki declines to audition for the acting workshop that she got accepted into. Yoshino eventually decides on hosting a hot lunch party at the middle school in an effort to preserve it. After giving sound advice to Ririko, Maki later runs into Iwao, who recalls that Maki used to smile a lot when she was a child. Having discovered about the upcoming audition from Kosuke, both Yoshino and Sanae convince Maki that she will regret not taking this opportunity.
20	"The Phoenix in the Holy Night"; Transliteration: "Seiya no Fenikkusu" (Japanese: 聖夜のフェニックス)	August 16, 2017
Although Moe is cast for a role, Maki is dismayed when she is not. At the middle school, Yoshino, Shiori, Ririko and Sanae realize that the hot lunch party was a bust. When Maki returns, she surmises that a closing ceremony was never held at the middle school. After having the idea of officially holding a closing ceremony, Yoshino runs this by Kadota, mentioning that the middle school could be repurposed in a positive way. As winter approaches, Yoshino, Shiori, Maki, Ririko and Sanae get Iwao on board with the closing ceremony. Maki is selected to take the leading role for a Christmas play about the Blood-soaked Santa, and she is put in charge of directing and playwriting, while the others will be stagehands. On the day of the closing ceremony, many past graduates and former staff arrive in attendance. After Kosuke leads his Kumi-daiko performance group in song, Maki takes center stage in the Christmas play, in which the middle school mural is featured at the end. When the closing ceremony proves to be a huge success, Yoshino announces her proposal to repurpose the middle school as a community centre dedicated to spreading local culture. Maki wants to form her own theatrical troupe and create a play about The Dragon's Song in order to explain its origins. An unknown benefactor pays for the cost of repairing the Hanging Drum, leading Maki to suspect that Iwao was behind this.
21	"The Pixie in the Town of Ice"; Transliteration: "Kōri no Machi no Pikushī" (Japanese: 氷の町のピクシー)	August 23, 2017
On the way back to the cabin, Shiori, Maki and Ririko come across Erika trying to hitchhike to Tokyo. Yoshino and Sanae bring their proposal to revive the Mizuchi Festival to the merchant board, and Chitose accepts on the condition that Yoshino and Sanae will obtain consent from all the local shopkeepers in the shopping district. Erika stays at the cabin in the meantime so she can cool her jets due to getting into a recent argument with Tomoko, while Shiori, Ririko and Sanae notify Tomoko about this. In the morning, Maki drops off Erika at her middle school. Confiding in Ririko, Shiori realizes that she is only one who has no interest in ever leaving Manoyama. When Shiori picks up Erika at her middle school, Erika reveals that Tomoko was against her getting out of town and closing up shop someday, which sparked her greatest fear. Noge tells Yoshino that the shopping district is no longer relevant anymore. Maki and Ririko hang out at Angelica, where Erika's younger brother Anji Suzuki express concern for Erika, while it is revealed that Takamizawa, Kindaichi and Noge buried the Golden Dragon in Hippo Park when they were kids. Yoshino, Ririko and Sanae meet with Takamizawa, Kindaichi and Noge at Hippo Park to locate the Golden Dragon. However, it is soon discovered that a secret code created by Takamizawa, Kindaichi and Noge must be solved first.
22	"The New Moon Luminarie"; Transliteration: "Shingetsu no Ruminarie" (Japanese: 新月のルミナリエ)	August 30, 2017
Kadota briefly visits Hide, who is nearly done carving the new shrine float. In the evening, Ririko figures out that the secret code must be read vertically instead of horizontally, though the message contradictorily says to take 2,427 steps outside of Hippo Park. After hearing that Takamizawa, Kindaichi and Noge ended up having their childhood dream jobs in one way or another, Anji later wonders about the Golden Dragon supposedly being able to grant wishes. At the log cabin, Erika eventually suffers a toothache from a loose molar. Thanks to Chitose for making a late-night phone call, Yoshino and Sanae manage to pick up a children's pain reliever from Setsuko Yaginuma, who owns the local pharmacy in the shopping district. Tomoko learns that Anji ran off to find the Golden Dragon in hopes of granting his wish for Erika to return home. During a blizzard, the townspeople search all over for Anji, but Mr. Sandal manages to find Anji and bring him back. Erika finally agrees to return home upon seeing how much Anji really wants her to stay in Manoyama. Shiori later has an idea to use hanging lanterns borrowed from Warabiya Village to liven up the shopping district in Manoyama. At Hippo Park, Takamizawa, Kindaichi and Noge manage to find the Golden Dragon, though it looks more like a small toy instead of a sacred treasure. They are then amazed to find the shopping district decorated with hanging lanterns.
23	"The Crystal of Melting Snow"; Transliteration: "Yukidoke no Kurisutaru" (Japanese: 雪解けのクリスタル)	September 6, 2017
Maki plans to adjust the sad ending of her play to something more upbeat. Yoshino and Shiori visit the neighboring city of Tomikura to meet Masaharu Kudo, a chief executive officer eager to open another location of his pastry shop business called Belem in Manoyama. After Yoshino and Shiori sample a box of pastel de nata with the other tourism board members, they request Chitose to convince one of the shopkeepers to rent out their store space. Yoshino, Shiori, Sanae and Kadota visit Akiyama, who is a grocery store owner living alone in the outskirts of town. However, Akiyama is against renting out his store space. Upon organizing an emergency meeting for Yoshino, Shiori, Sanae and Kadota to observe, Chitose considers disbanding the merchant board altogether since the shopping district has become obsolete. When Akiyama gets pressured by the other merchant board members to rent out his store space, Yoshino points out that no one should be forced to do something for the benefit of revitalizing the town. Akiyama's former tenant ran an accessory shop eight years ago but flew the coop within less than six months, leaving Akiyama to pay off the business loan. Upon hearing this story, Shiozaki ashamedly volunteers to rent out his store space instead. Maki changes the ending of her play by having Ririko as the dragon girl appear as a spirit and sing the Dragon's Song. Soon after, Kadota confirms rumors that Manoyama is planning to be assimilated into Tomikura within two years.
24	"The Eternal Obelisk"; Transliteration: "Yūkyū no Oberisuku" (Japanese: 悠久のオベリスク)	September 13, 2017
Yoshino, Shiori, Maki, Ririko and Sanae believe that holding the Mizuchi Festival might preserve Manoyama. After being warned by Amamiya that Kume wants to do a live broadcast of the Mizuchi Festival only if the role of the dragon girl will be recast by one of the network idols, Yoshino, Shiori and Sanae later inform Maki and Ririko about this. Although Yoshino suggests alternative roles for Ririko, Kadota outright chases away Kume in refusal instead of negotiating such a proposal. The informational web series is then used to promote the preparations of the Mizuchi Festival, which encourages individual donations. After hearing that Sayuri and Kumano will open a restaurant in the shopping district, Yoshino tells Shiori, Maki, Ririko and Sanae that she plans on staying in Manoyama. While cleaning the stone dragon shrine, Yoshino, Shiori, Ririko, Sanae, Dokushima and Mr. Sandal discover a stone memorial listing the people who constructed Sakura Pond, including Mr. Sandal's great-grandparents. Two days before the Mizuchi Festival, the townspeople band together wearing their happi to throw a surprise birthday party for Yoshino. During the beginning of the Mizuchi Festival, Kadota glances at the stone memorial and devises a way for Manoyama and Mr. Sandal's hometown to become sister cities. Kadota rushes out of town to meet Mayor Naumann, the mayor of Mr. Sandal's hometown who is visiting Kanazawa to view the cherry blossoms, while Yoshino urges Chitose and Dokushima to trust that Kadota will not repeat the mistake that he made fifty years ago.
25	"The Kingdom of Cherry Blossoms"; Transliteration: "Sakura no Ōkoku" (Japanese: 桜の王国)	September 20, 2017
Yoshino receives a surprise visit from Yae, Souichirou and Nagisa, while Amamiya arrives to film some events for the evening news broadcast. With some help from Takamizawa, Kindaichi and Noge, Kadota manages to bring Mayor Naumann back to Manoyama in time for the Dragon's Song play. After Kosuke leads his Kumi-daiko performance group in song, the Dragon's Song play begins, in which Kadota and Chitose have minor role, and it ends with Ririko singing the Dragon's Song in full. Kadota and Mayor Naumann quickly become friends after the townspeople celebrate the success of the Mizuchi Festival. Yoshino, Shiori, Maki, Ririko and Sanae view the cherry blossoms. Sanae wants to open a regional consulting office in the shopping district, Maki wants to write another play based on local folktale, Ririko wants to travel the world and Shiori wants to continue working in the tourism board. Yoshino decides to leave Manoyama once her term as queen comes to an end, though she will always consider Manoyama as a second hometown. During the abdication ceremony, Kadota announces the end of the Chupakabura Kingdom since Manoyama is now capable of change. The townspeople bid Yoshino farewell as she takes her leave by train. Mr. Sandal remarks that Yoshino traveled to another town in hopes of revitalizing it, instead of returning to Tokyo. The final scene shows Yoshino and her ministers pursuing their own dreams, with Yoshino arriving at another struggling town to revitalize it.
