= Wesenrein =

- Grimm episode
- Episode no.: Season 4 Episode 9
- Directed by: Hanelle Culpepper
- Written by: Thomas Ian Griffith
- Cinematography by: Fernando Argüelles
- Editing by: Ray Daniels III
- Production code: 409
- Original air date: January 16, 2015
- Running time: 42 minutes

Guest appearances
- Alexis Denisof as Prince Viktor Chlodwig zu Schellendorf von Konigsburg; Brandon Quinn as Charlie Riken; Will Rothhaar as Jessie Acker; Nick Krause as Jonah Riken; Ted Rooney as Purifier; Robert Blanche as Sgt. Franco

Episode chronology
← Previous "Chupacabra"	Next → "Tribunal"
- Grimm season 4

"Wesenrein" is the ninth episode and midseason premiere of season 4 of the supernatural drama television series Grimm and the 75th episode overall, which premiered on January 16, 2015, on the NBC network. The episode was written by Thomas Ian Griffith and was directed by Hanelle Culpepper.

== Plot ==
Opening quote: "He had them brought before the court, and a judgment was handed down."

Staring at her woged reflection in a mirror, Juliette (Bitsie Tulloch) returns to her human form and decides not to tell Nick (David Giuntoli) about it. Meanwhile, Nick and Hank (Russell Hornsby) pick up Wu (Reggie Lee) from the jail cell, then take him to Nick's trailer to present him to the Wesen world.

Meanwhile, Rosalee (Bree Turner) notes something is not right and goes out to find that officer Acker (Will Rothhaar) is injured and Monroe (Silas Weir Mitchell) is missing, so calls the police. Meanwhile, in the back of a getaway van, a masked man tells a tied-up Monroe that he's going to love watching him die. Nick, Hank and Wu arrive with Rosalee and question Acker about what happened. Nick then calls Juliette to tell her that Rosalee will stay at their home until she and Monroe are safe. Meanwhile, Monroe is taken to an abandoned warehouse where the members of the Wesenrein chain him while under the watch of Jonah Riken (Nick Krause) and also finds a fellow prisoner named Terry (Nick Hope), who has also been imprisoned there for an unknown time.

Nick and Hank meet with Renard (Sasha Roiz) to discuss the members of the Wesenrein that Trubel had investigated before and they set off to find Shaw (Don MacEllis), one of their members. Renard has a Skalenzahne named Sam Damerov (Kenajuan Bentley) find the members of the Wesenrein while he persuades Wu not to tell anyone about the unfolding events. Wu is surprised Renard is aware of Wesen too. Nick and Hank arrive at Shaw's house and he tries to escape but ends up arrested as they find his Wesenrein mask in his pocket. Meanwhile, the Wesenrein take Terry out of the warehouse and Terry gives Monroe a ring, requesting it be given to his wife. In Vienna, Prince Viktor (Alexis Denisof) tells Adalind (Claire Coffee) that they will travel to Portland to retrieve her child.

Nick and Hank interrogate Shaw in the room but as they have no luck, Nick asks to interrogate him alone in order to intimidate him. Now alone, Nick uses his Grimm persona to threaten Shaw and punches him multiple times until he is stopped by Renard. Renard decides to release him because of lack of evidence and have an officer placed outside his house; whilst also informing Wu about the type of Wesen in this case. Shaw returns home where someone calls to meet him at the back of his house. He arrives at a car where he meets the Wesenrein's Grand Master, Charlie Riken (Brandon Quinn), who kills him in order to prevent him from telling anyone about them.

Back in Nick's house, Rosalee and Juliette get into an argument where Rosalee pressures her to call Nick and do things like a proper Grimm, causing Juliette to woge into a Hexenbiest and attack Rosalee, culminating with her ripping her throat out, killing her. However, this is all revealed to be just a nightmare, as Rosalee awakens Juliette from a nap. Nick, Hank and Wu investigate Shaw's murder and inside the house they find his Wesenrein clothes and a photograph with him and policeman Acker, confirming that he's also a member of the Wesenrein. Meanwhile, Monroe manages to trick Jonah, knocking him out and freeing himself and escaping from the warehouse. However, he's pursued by the Wesenrein and flees to the woods. He then stops as he comes upon Terry's mutilated corpse impaled on a stake set above a fire pit, where he's recaptured and sent back to the warehouse. Riken chastises his brother for his irresponsibility and states that Monroe's fate will be decided by the tribunal not him. He then accuses Monroe of having no respect for his heritage, so needs to answer for his sins.

Nick and Hank discover that Acker has been calling Shaw and called multiple times to the prison to an inmate called Walker Williams. Using his Grimm persona, Nick has Williams confess that the Grand Master is Charlie Riken, who was once his cell mate, and Acker called him as Riken did not want his calls traced back to him or be pursued. While Nick, Hank and Wu investigate Riken's house (finding his cellphone), Monroe is brought back to the woods where the tribunal begins - there, Riken sits in head position as everyone surrounds another sharpened stake, chanting : "Wesenrein", on repeat...

== Reception ==
=== Viewers ===
The episode was viewed by 4.62 million people, earning a 1.2/4 in the 18-49 rating demographics on the Nielson ratings scale, ranking third on its timeslot and seventh for the night in the 18-49 demographics, behind Last Man Standing, 20/20, Undercover Boss, Blue Bloods, Hawaii Five-0, and Shark Tank. This was a 9% decrease in viewership from the previous episode, which was watched by 5.07 million viewers with a 1.3/4. This means that 1.2 percent of all households with televisions watched the episode, while 4 percent of all households watching television at that time watched it. With DVR factoring in, the episode was watched by 7.47 million viewers and had a 2.3 ratings share in the 18-49 demographics.

=== Critical reviews ===
"Wesenrein" received mostly positive reviews. Kathleen Wiedel from TV Fanatic, gave a 4.5 star rating out of 5, stating: "Whew! I thought I'd never get a chance to catch my breath. Grimm Season 4 Episode 9 is almost non-stop excitement, from Wu's initiation into the Wonderful World of Wesen, to Juliette's unexpected Hexenification, to Monroe's kidnapping. Let's preface this review by saying that 'Wesenrein' was a fabulous episode. The drama was levied by a fair amount of grim (pun intended) humor, and it all left me just waiting for next week's episode."

MaryAnn Sleasman from TV.com, wrote, "'Wesenrein' was an exciting return from Grimm's winter hiatus, introducing new mythology to the masses and new masses to the mythology. However, despite its incredible tension, the episode also felt oddly stagnant. The only truly unexpected event and real, measurable progress came with Wu learning the truth. Monroe escaped only to be recaptured, and Rosalie fretted while Juliette walked the line between Hexenbiest and human being (or whatever it was that was going on with her). Almost everyone's status remains unchanged, even after that big cliffhanger Grimm left us with in December."

Christine Horton of Den of Geek wrote, "This was a 'to be continued' episode, and with the pace of the action being so fast, it was somewhat a surprise when the credits rolled. It's actually great to see Wu as part of the team now that they’re bringing him in on the hunt for Monroe. The next episode will be a race against time to save our favorite Blutbad, and I for one can't wait."
