= The Grimm Who Stole Christmas =

- Grimm episode
- Episode no.: Season 4 Episode 7
- Directed by: John Gray
- Written by: Dan E. Fesman
- Cinematography by: Fernando Argüelles
- Editing by: Chris Willingham
- Production code: 407
- Original air date: December 5, 2014
- Running time: 42 minutes

Guest appearances
- Jacqueline Toboni as Theresa "Trubel" Rubel; Lucas Near-Verbrugghe as Josh Porter; Danny Bruno as Bud Wurstner

Episode chronology
← Previous "Highway of Tears"	Next → "Chupacabra"
- Grimm season 4

"The Grimm Who Stole Christmas" is the seventh episode of season 4 of the supernatural drama television series Grimm and the 73rd episode overall in the series, which premiered on December 5, 2014, on NBC. The episode was written by Dan E. Fesman and was directed by John Gray.

== Plot ==
Opening quote: "I have but to swallow this, and be for the rest of my days persecuted by a legion of goblins, all of my own creation. Humbug, I'll tell you; humbug!"

During a Christmas party in a home, the doorbell rings, but there is no one there, only an enormous wrapped box at the door. Two guests bring in the parcel and put it down by their hosts' Christmas tree. Later that night, a goblin-like Wesen gets out of the box. He unlocks the front door and lets two more goblin-like Wesen in and they begin to wreak havoc in the house, waking the couple. The husband goes down stairs to see what is happening and the three goblin like Wesen severely attack him before escaping.

Monroe (Silas Weir Mitchell) invites Rosalee (Bree Turner) on their delayed honeymoon, and she accepts. Nick (David Giuntoli), Hank (Russell Hornsby) and Wu (Reggie Lee) investigate the home invasion and question the wife Emma (Charissa J. Adams). Nick and Hank find that the gift was opened from inside and there's fruitcake surrounding the gift. Meanwhile, Trubel (Jacqueline Toboni) is leaving the house when Josh (Lucas Near-Verbrugghe) asks to go with her, since he wants to prove his valor. They watch over Shaw (Donald MacEllis), who is telling everyone of Trubel's abilities. She sneaks around the outside of the house, peering in a window, and is found by a Schakal, who was just arriving. Josh knocks out the Schakal before he can attack Trubel. Trubel discovers the mask that belongs to the Secundum Naturae Ordinem Wesen and they go.

Trubel reports this to Nick, who tells her to go with Bud (Danny Bruno) to get names. Based on the location of three crimes related to the home invasion, Nick and Hank discover that a church is in the center of the invasions. Renard (Sasha Roiz) talks with Nick, discussing Elizabeth's departure in search of Kelly and Adalind's daughter, left and Wu's growing suspicion of the Wesen issues. Nick and Hank are then called to a house where the goblins are causing chaos. Two of them flee while another attacks Nick until Hank knocks him out. Unsure if it's Wesen, they decide to take it to Monroe and Rosalee to learn more about it. They go to the trailer and find that they are dealing with Kallikantzaroi, a condition that affects Indole Gentile children and makes them commit acts without them knowing. They also find that if they eat fruitcake, they would be cured of the condition.

Juliette (Bitsie Tulloch) confides to Rosalee that she has been having nausea every day and Rosalee suggests that she may be pregnant. Then, the Kallikantzaroi escapes from his confinement and two others arrive at the house. They cause chaos across the house until Monroe arrives and scares them with his Blutbad roar. While cleaning the room, Rosalee finds a medical bracelet for asthma. Nick and Hank identify him as John Katsaros (Greg Goran) and question his parents, who explain that he performs in a youth choir in the church. Nick and Hank manage to guide the boys to a truck that is full of fruitcakes just outside the church, curing them. The next day, Trubel tells Nick that Josh is going back to Philadelphia and she will go with him and they hug a goodbye. Nick gives them Aunt Marie's car and they drive off to Philadelphia. Meanwhile, Juliette takes a pregnancy test but the result of the test is not revealed.

== Reception ==
=== Viewers ===
The episode was viewed by 4.96 million people, earning a 1.2/4 in the 18-49 rating demographics on the Nielson ratings scale, ranking third on its timeslot and sixth for the night in the 18-49 demographics, behind The Amazing Race, Last Man Standing, 20/20, Shark Tank, and a college football game. This was a 5% decrease in viewership from the previous episode, which was watched by 5.17 million viewers with a 1.2/4. This means that 1.2 percent of all households with televisions watched the episode, while 4 percent of all households watching television at that time watched it. With DVR factoring in, the episode was watched by 7.56 million viewers and had a 2.2 ratings share in the 18-49 demographics.

=== Critical reviews ===
"The Grimm Who Stole Christmas" received positive reviews. Kathleen Wiedel from TV Fanatic, gave a 4 star rating out of 5, stating: "'Tis the season for holiday-themed episodes, and Grimm is no exception. This time, Nick and friends were faced with a trio of destructive Christmas gremlins! Though silly and mostly light-hearted, Grimm Season 4 Episode 7 had some great moments, too."

MaryAnn Sleasman from TV.com, wrote, "However, alongside the seasonal antics, 'The Grimm Who Stole Christmas' featured enough plot development and STUFF going down that at times, it felt like a mid-season finale. Wu has all but figured out that Nick and Hank lied about the Wesen he saw. Juliette is probably preggers with not-Adalind's-but-probably-somehow-tied-to-her sex-magic baby (my head hurts). Trubel took off on a road trip with Josh in Aunt Marie's old car to make sure he doesn't get his non-Grimm ass killed. Renard and Nick are worried that their mommies are going to murder each other. The Christmas plot was weird and featured a lot of oddly cheesy camerawork, but the episode as a whole was far from a loss."

Christine Horton of Den of Geek wrote, "The cliffhanger, if you could call it that, is that it does indeed seem Juliette is pregnant. (The possibility dawns on her after a bout of nausea that lasts about four seconds before she’s fine again and chasing down four foot tall Grinches.) Of course, her worry is that she fell pregnant while in the guise of Adalind, which makes the whole thing quite confusing. I may be alone in feeling it's a little too soon for another baby storyline, but it's a way to keep Juliette in the show I suppose, without having to write in her veterinary skills to aid the plot."
