= Inunaki Dam =

Coordinates: 33°41′16″N 130°33′34″E

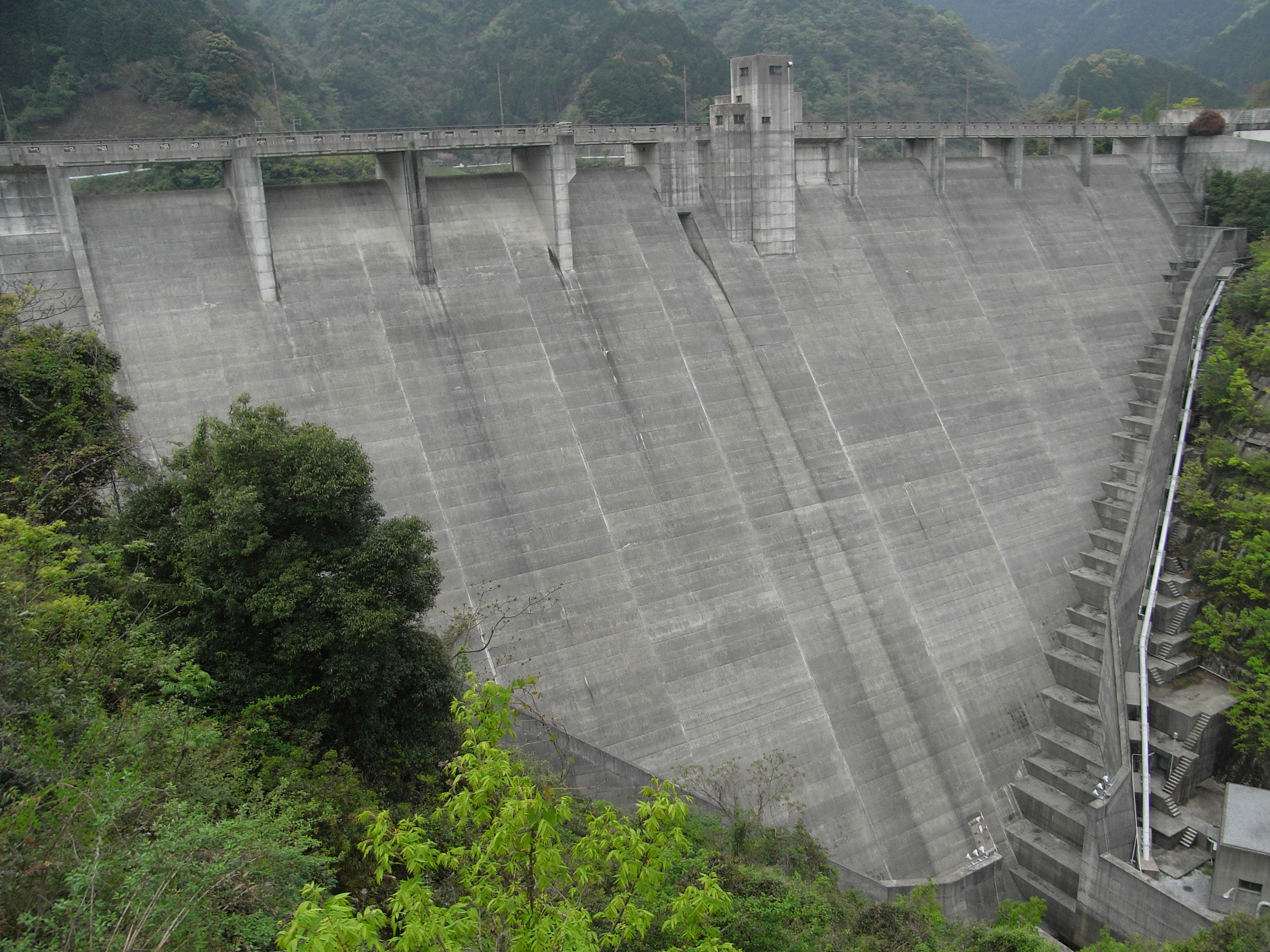
- Location: Miyawaka, Fukuoka, Japan
- Construction began: 1970
- Opening date: 1994

Dam and spillways
- Impounds: Inunakigawa River
- Height: 76.5 m
- Length: 230 m

Reservoir
- Total capacity: 5,000,000 m^{3}
- Catchment area: 6.1 km^{2}
- Surface area: 23 hectares

Inunaki Dam (犬鳴ダム, Inunaki damu) is a dam in Miyawaka, Fukuoka Prefecture, Japan. It was completed in 1994.
