= Tribunal (Grimm) =

- Grimm episode
- Episode no.: Season 4 Episode 10
- Directed by: Peter Werner
- Written by: David Greenwalt; Jim Kouf
- Cinematography by: Eliot Rockett
- Editing by: Chris Willingham
- Production code: 410
- Original air date: January 23, 2015
- Running time: 42 minutes

Guest appearances
- Will Rothhaar as Jessie Acker; Brandon Quinn as Charlie Riken; Nick Krause as Jonah Riken; Danny Bruno as Bud Wurstner; Ted Rooney as Purifier

Episode chronology
← Previous "Wesenrein"	Next → "Death Do Us Part"
- Grimm season 4

"Tribunal" is the tenth episode of season 4 of the supernatural drama television series Grimm and the 76th episode overall, which premiered on January 23, 2015, on the cable network NBC. The episode was written by series creators David Greenwalt and Jim Kouf and was directed by Peter Werner.

== Plot ==
Opening quote: "May the God of Vengeance now yield me His place to punish the wicked."

Monroe's (Silas Weir Mitchell) trial begins and is then purified on the orders of Riken (Brandon Quinn). Nick (David Giuntoli) and Hank (Russell Hornsby) show to Renard (Sasha Roiz) the evidence they found and he tells them to let Wu (Reggie Lee) find Acker (Will Rothhaar) and talk to him about the Wesenrein. Meanwhile, Juliette (Bitsie Tulloch) and Rosalee (Bree Turner) check into the wedding's guest list and compare it to Trubel's name list to find any connection, finding five mysterious people attending and decide to ask Bud (Danny Bruno).

Back to the tribunal, the Wesenrein begins, first accusing Monroe of two charges: marrying a different Wesen and befriending a Grimm. Monroe woges, hits the guards and escapes into the forest but is quickly caught by Jonah (Nick Krause) but kills one of the members before being brought back to the tribunal. The Wesenrein are shown photos of his wedding and state that a witness testified that saw him with a Grimm. Meanwhile, Wu talks with Acker, putting pressure on him in order to showcase his lies. Acker eventually woges into a Bauerschwein and Nick furiously interrogates him to reveal Monroe's location. He is stopped by Renard, who orders Acker to be jailed.

With Bud's help, Juliette and Rosalee see that a guest brought a woman named Suzanne (Maggie Kemper) and go to her office to question her. Suzanne explains that her brother, identifying him as Acker, could know about it. Bud is kidnapped by a member of the Wesenrein. He is then brought to the tribunal as the key witness. Riken questions him of his involvement with the Grimm and he states that he has helped him a few times. Monroe decides to testify and criticizes the Wesenrein's methods for not seeing what's right and that he declares himself innocent. Riken then asks for vote from the Wesenrein and in a unanimous decision, Monroe is declared guilty and sentenced to death. Wu brings Suzanne to the station where Nick threatens Acker to kill her unless he reveals the location. He eventually reveals that the tribunal is held in Oxbow Park.

Before Monroe is burned at the stake, Nick, Juliette, Hank, Renard, Wu and Rosalee arrive and attack the Wesenrein with Wu arresting most of them while Riken, Jonah and two members flee. Wu kills one of the members while Renard kills the other member. Jonah attacks Juliette but she woges into her Hexenbiest form and uses her powers to explode his head. Riken tries to kill Monroe but Rosalee appears and they both maul Riken to his death. Renard decides to use the excuse of a cult as a way to arrest the member and naming Acker as their leader. Monroe and Rosalee are escorted by the police for their delayed honeymoon. That night, Renard is visited by Juliette, who reveals her Hexenbiest form to him, shocking him.

== Reception ==
=== Viewers ===
The episode was viewed by 5.02 million people, earning a 1.3/4 in the 18-49 rating demographics on the Nielson ratings scale, ranking second on its timeslot and fourth for the night in the 18-49 demographics, behind Dateline NBC, Undercover Boss, and a rerun of Shark Tank. This was an 8% increase in viewership from the previous episode, which was watched by 4.62 million viewers with a 1.2/4. This means that 1.3 percent of all households with televisions watched the episode, while 4 percent of all households watching television at that time watched it. With DVR factoring in, the episode was watched by 7.62 million viewers and had a 2.3 ratings share in the 18-49 demographics.

=== Critical reviews ===
"Tribunal" received enormous praise. Kathleen Wiedel from TV Fanatic, gave a 4.9 star rating out of 5, stating: "Amazing. Simply amazing. From Wu's confrontation with Officer Acker to Monroe's impassioned declaration of love for Rosalee, to the Awesome Posse rounding the corner on the way to save Monroe, there's so much to like about Grimm Season 4 Episode 10 that I'm not sure where to start! 'Tribunal' was fast-paced and exciting, despite the fact that we were all about 95% sure Nick and company were going to successfully save Monroe."

MaryAnn Sleasman from TV.com, wrote, "Through Nick, Grimm has explored the meaning of being a Grimm with great success. Now that he has wholeheartedly accepted his lot in life, it's actually exciting to see Juliette receive the same level of attention and detail, especially with her newfound 'otherness' falling into an awkward place in relation to Nick. More please!"

Christine Horton of Den of Geek wrote, "Tribunal is an example what the show is at when it's at its best: funny, sweet, intriguing and bloody. Hopefully the writers can now keep it up for the rest of the season."
