= Highway of Tears (Grimm) =

- Grimm episode
- Episode no.: Season 4 Episode 6
- Directed by: John Behring
- Written by: Alan DiFiore
- Cinematography by: Eliot Rockett
- Editing by: Ray Daniels III
- Production code: 406
- Original air date: November 28, 2014
- Running time: 42 minutes

Guest appearances
- Jacqueline Toboni as Theresa "Trubel" Rubel; Alexis Denisof as Prince Viktor Chlodwig zu Schellendorf von Konigsburg; Louise Lombard as Elizabeth Lascelles; Erick Avari as J.P. Turner; Toni Trucks as Janelle Farris; Philip Anthony-Rodriguez as Marcus Rispoli; Lucas Near-Verbrugghe as Josh Porter

Episode chronology
← Previous "Cry Luison"	Next → "The Grimm Who Stole Christmas"
- Grimm season 4

"Highway of Tears" is the sixth episode of season 4 of the supernatural drama television series Grimm and the 72nd episode overall, which premiered on November 28, 2014, on the cable network NBC. The episode was written by Alan DiFiore and was directed by John Behring.

== Plot ==
Opening quote: "There is no mercy in you. You cut off the heads of men and women and these you wear as a garland around your neck."

Hank (Russell Hornsby) uses a hose to extinguish the flaming Wolfsangel. Inside the house, Monroe (Silas Weir Mitchell) is furious at the Wolfsangel but decides not to report it since they won't stop. Rosalee (Bree Turner) explains that it must be the Secundum Naturae Ordinem Wesen, an ancient organization composed of Wesen that want the Wesen species to be pure and they consider marriage between mixed Wesen a crime against nature. Seeing all this, Juliette (Bitsie Tulloch) states that she will take the potion in order to restore Nick's (David Giuntoli) powers.

A couple, Dix (Ricki Bhullar) and Suleka Turner (Khushi Dayal), are driving on the highway when they hit a spike strip and they crash in the woods. A truck that has been following them stops and two Komodo-like Wesen arrive and take Dix but leave Suleka behind since she's pinned by the crash. In Vienna, Prince Viktor (Alexis Denisof) asks Adalind (Claire Coffee) about the people who rescued her. She responds that Kelly and Meisner helped her and Diana escape and Viktor reveals he lost the baby to the Resistance in the airport.

In Nick's house, Elizabeth (Louise Lombard) finishes the antidote and has Juliette inhale the vapor from the hat, transforming her into Adalind. After everyone leaves, Nick and Juliette go upstairs and have sex. After finishing, Juliette goes to the bathroom and experiences severe pain until she returns to her normal form. The next morning, Trubel (Jacqueline Toboni) and Monroe visit them to see if he has his powers back but he is still normal. Nick is then called by Hank to investigate the murder. Trubel is leaving the house when she sees a person named Mann (Daniel Brockley), whom she accuses of working with Chavez and leaves. When she returns, she finds Josh (Lucas Near-Verbrugghe) in the house, who states he had nowhere to go.

Nick and Hank meet with Wu (Reggie Lee) and Deputy Sheriff Janelle Farris (Toni Trucks) in the crash. Nick finds a piece of wood with nails and also discovers an old case from six years ago. They return to the crash and use a metal detector to find a reptilian figure just like the previous case. Nick and Hank go to the trailer and see they're facing a Phansigar, a Wesen that use their tongue to choke victims and sacrifice a couple to Kali every three years. With the materials used in the figure, they deduce that it must take place in a salvage yard. There's only one salvage yard near the highway which was bought by a man named J.P. (Erick Avari) and his sons Sharat (Amitesh Prasad) and Adesh (Tarun Shetty).

Farris confronts J.P. in the salvage yard but Adesh uses his powers to knock her out, upsetting J.P. but his sons convince him that it's good enough for the sacrifice. That night, Nick, Hank and Monroe sneak in the salvage yard just as J.P. and the sons begin the sacrifice, placing each victim on a pit, planning to bury them alive. Nick suffers a headache, causing J.P. and his sons to disappear for a moment. Hank and Monroe seize the moment to enter the pits but they return soon after. They also catch Nick, however, Nick regains his powers and easily defeats them and saves Hank and Monroe as well as the victims. Nick and Hank give the report to Renard (Sasha Roiz), who is also glad that Nick regained his powers. Nick, Juliette and Trubel return to the house where Nick finds Josh holding a machete. He asks if he knows how to handle it and Josh replies that he does not.

== Reception ==
=== Viewers ===
The episode was viewed by 5.17 million people, earning a 1.2/4 in the 18-49 rating demographics on the Nielson ratings scale, ranking first on its timeslot and third for the night in the 18-49 demographics, behind 20/20, and Dateline NBC. This was a 5% decrease in viewership from the previous episode, which was watched by 5.43 million viewers with a 1.3/5. This means that 1.2 percent of all households with televisions watched the episode, while 4 percent of all households watching television at that time watched it. With DVR factoring in, the episode was watched by 8.07 million viewers and had a 2.4 ratings share in the 18-49 demographics.

=== Critical reviews ===
"Highway of Tears" received positive reviews. Kathleen Wiedel from TV Fanatic, gave a 4.8 star rating out of 5, stating: "It seemed like it'd been forever since Adalind stripped Nick of his Grimm abilities, but in Grimm Season 4 Episode 6, Nick and Juliette struck back (and apparently had a lot of fun doing it)! Portland has two Grimms again (two and a half, if you count Josh)! While the villains of the week weren't necessarily the most compelling or well-developed characters out there (the excellent Erick Avari in particular seemed underutilized), it was still immensely satisfying when Nick made his triumphant return to form by definitively trouncing the three Phansigars."

MaryAnn Sleasman from TV.com, wrote, "So as a standalone episode, 'Highway of Tears' doesn't really hold its own. However, as a part of Season 4 overall, it's easy to see how the episode is something of a keystone. As we head into mid-season finale time, it was imperative for the show to get its major players in order—especially concerning Nick’s powers. Nobody liked a de-powered Nick. Nobody."

Christine Horton of Den of Geek wrote, "Grimm treated us this week to plot development, some delicious dialogue, and the best laugh-out-loud line of the series so far. This was all a relief, particularly as we were all expecting the most awkward sex scene in TV history. To recap, we discovered last week that Juliette must sleep with Nick in the guise of arch nemesis Adalind in order for Nick to regain his powers."
