= Chupacabra (Grimm) =

- Grimm episode
- Episode no.: Season 4 Episode 8
- Directed by: Aaron Lipstadt
- Written by: Brenna Kouf
- Cinematography by: Eliot Rockett
- Editing by: George Pilkinton
- Production code: 408
- Original air date: December 12, 2014
- Running time: 42 minutes

Guest appearances
- Alexis Denisof as Prince Viktor Chlodwig zu Schellendorf von Konigsburg; Max Arciniega as Diego Hoyos; Alyssa Diaz as Bélem Hoyos; Will Rothhaar as Jessie Acker; Bernhard Forcher as Hans Tavitian; Philip Anthony-Rodriguez as Marcus Rispoli; Robert Blanche as Sgt. Franco

Episode chronology
← Previous "The Grimm Who Stole Christmas"	Next → "Wesenrein"
- Grimm season 4

"Chupacabra" is the eighth episode and midseason finale of season 4 of the supernatural drama television series Grimm and the 74th episode overall, which premiered on December 12, 2014, on the cable network NBC. The episode was written by Brenna Kouf and was directed by Aaron Lipstadt.

== Plot ==
Opening quote: "Cuide su rebaño, nunca deje su lado. Cuide su sangre, el Chupacabra tiene hambre." ("Take care of your flock, never leave their side. Watch your blood, for the chupacabra is hungry.")

In the Dominican Republic, two doctors, Diego Hoyos (Max Arciniega) and Gabe Reyes (Andrew Harris) leave for a flight to Portland when Diego is bitten by a mosquito. When he returns to Portland, Diego sees that the bite has grown even more and he kills his neighbor outside.

Meanwhile, Monroe (Silas Weir Mitchell) and Rosalee (Bree Turner) are packing and preparing for their delayed honeymoon. Nick (David Giuntoli), Hank (Russell Hornsby) and Wu arrive at the scene of the neighbor's murder and interrogate one of the neighbors, who claims that the victim was killed by "El Chupacabra". Nick and Hank meet with Juliette (Bitsie Tulloch) to know more about El Chupacabra, she explains that her grandmother told her stories about it. They then read entries that the creature is a Wældreór, a Wesen that is suffering a rare blood disease.

Juliette reveals to Rosalee that she took the pregnancy test many times and she wasn't pregnant but is told to go to a doctor if the symptoms continue. After she leaves, Rosalee receives a chilling telephone call and a mystery voice tells her, "You made a mistake". She then goes to the back of the house and finds the corpse of a fox, being warned that her blood will be next. Wu talks with Renard (Sasha Roiz) about Nick and Hank, but he's brushed off. Renard is then called by Hans Tavitian (Bernhard Forcher), who asks for a meeting as he is in Portland. He explains that there's a mole in the Resistance and asks Tavitian to help him find the mole and get back Diana.

The next day, Diego loses control of the disease, attacks Gabe in his office, escaping while still transformed. He runs into Wu and Franco (Robert Blanche) and when Wu catches him, he returns to his human form, confusing him and in an act of confusion, he disappears. After receiving the information from Gabe, Nick and Hank visit Diego's wife, Bélem (Alyssa Diaz), who is a Coyotl and tell her to call them once Diego gets home. When they leave the house, they're confronted by Wu, who demands an explanation or he will quit as he does not seem to be stable. Nick and Hank decide that it's time to tell him the truth.

Diego arrives at the house and attacks Bélem. They manage to fight off Diego and handcuff but Wu is so shocked at what he sees that he drives off. Nick and Hank bring Diego and Bélem to the spice shop where Rosalee only manages to do a syringe, which Diego injects in Bélem, saving her. Diego states to Nick that he has to kill him and when he refuses, he transforms, forcing Hank to kill him. Wu makes a chaos in a bar and is arrested. Nick and Hank have an officer watch out Monroe and Rosalee until they depart. Seeing that the officer is staying all night, Rosalee makes him a snack and Monroe goes out to give it to him. The cop turns around and is revealed to be a masked member of the Wesenrein. Monroe is then knocked out from behind by another mask-wearing Wesenrein. In Nick's house, Juliette suffers a headache and somehow, transforms into a Hexenbiest, screaming in shock.

== Reception ==
=== Viewers ===
The episode was viewed by 5.07 million people, earning a 1.3/4 in the 18-49 rating demographics on the Nielson ratings scale, ranking second on its timeslot and fourth for the night in the 18-49 demographics, behind Dateline NBC, 20/20, and Shark Tank. This was a 2% increase in viewership from the previous episode, which was watched by 4.96 million viewers with a 1.2/4. This means that 1.3 percent of all households with televisions watched the episode, while 4 percent of all households watching television at that time watched it. With DVR factoring in, the episode was watched by 7.86 million viewers and had a 2.3 ratings share in the 18-49 demographics.

=== Critical reviews ===
"Chupacabra" received mostly positive reviews. Kathleen Wiedel from TV Fanatic, gave a 4.9 star rating out of 5, stating: "Well, I can safely say I did not see that twist coming. Of all the theories surrounding Juliette's symptoms, not one I read came close to the grand reveal during the closing moments of Grimm Season 4 Episode 8. Well played, Grimm, well played."

MaryAnn Sleasman from TV.com, wrote, "'Chupacabra' was a strong episode as far as fall finales go, and let's be frank, Grimm has never really suffered from the sort of 'pre-hiatus letdown' issue that so many other series often struggle with; the show always tends to deliver the goods, be they in the form of zombies or monster babies or beheadings. That's why, when 'Chupacabra' initially appeared to be a standard case-o'-the-week adventure, I fretted. And there was a case of the week, certainly, but it was the sort of case that's tragic and engaging, plus it tied in rather well with the larger story at hand."

Christine Horton of Den of Geek wrote, "The mid-season finale is upon us already, and could easily have the alternate title, the one where stuff happens."
