= Mini-dokuritsukoku =

Imitation of independent countries

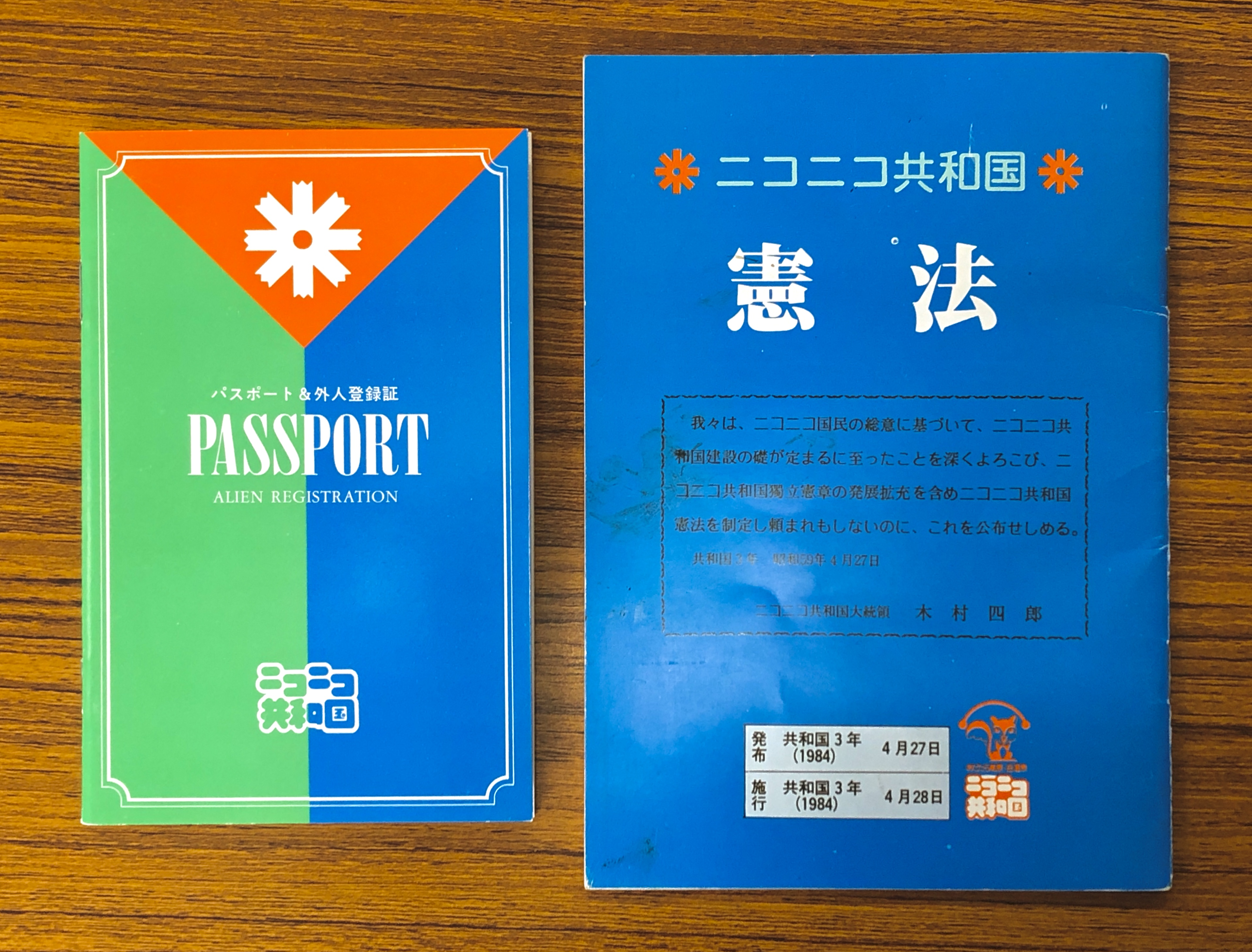
A passport and the Constitution of Nikoniko Republic, a mini-dokuritsukoku in Nihonmatsu, Fukushima

Mini-dokuritsukoku (ミニ独立国, "mini-independent countries") are micronations established in Japan. More specifically, it refers to those founded in the 1980s during the "micronation boom", when local communities and businesses declared "independence" to promote tourism, local culture and rural business, and to combat migration of young people into cities due to urbanization. The majority of micronations established are light-hearted experiments and had no intention to challenge the government sovereignty. To this effect, the term is sometimes translated as "parody states".

== History ==
=== Before 1970s ===
Following the end of World War II, several micronations were inadvertently created during the Occupation of Japan. Between 1946 and 1968, the Bonin Islands were governed by the United States Navy, though it was neither made part of the United States nor Japan. Native islanders established a Bonin Islands Council and travelled with ID cards that listed Chichi-jima as their nationality. Meanwhile, Izu Ōshima was removed from Japanese administration through an oversight by the Supreme Commander for the Allied Powers in 1946. Realizing the mistake, islanders drafted a "Ōshima Charter" (Japanese: 大島大誓言, romanized: Ōshima Daiseigon) that called for the establishment of the "Republic of Ōshima" (Japanese: 大島共和国, romanized: Ōshima Kyōwa-Koku). The island was restored to Japanese rule on March 22, ending the 53-day autonomy of the island.

=== Micronation boom ===
In 1977, residents of Usa, Ōita established the "New Yamatai State". Named after the legendary Yamatai state, the micronation hoped to revitalize the city's economy. Local cities and businesses followed suit after Governor of the Kanagawa Prefecture Kazuji Nagasu advocated for the decentralization of policy-making during what he called the "local era" (Japanese: 地方の時代, romanized: chihō no jidai), and novelist Hisashi Inoue's publication of Kirikirijin in 1981, telling the story of a village that secedes from Japan and proclaims its marginalized dialect its national language. The story was in turn inspired by the micronation of New Atlantis.

The following micronation boom, fuelled by copy cat behaviour from businesses such as ryokan and minshuku, reached its peak at 1983 before seeing the numbers of new micronations decline. By 1988, approximately 150 micronations had been established. Between 1988 and 1989, at the height of the Japanese asset price bubble, a smaller second boom occurred when the Japanese government announced the "100 Million Yen Project" (Japanese: ふるさと創生事業), a plan that called for huge investments in municipalities.

Many of the micronations were "light-hearted ventures", and did not advocate secession from Japan or the formation of a formal state. Many were established for the sake of publicity, and were treated as such by the Government of Japan, for example, when Ministry of International Trade and Industry Michio Watanabe signed a treaty of friendship between Japan and the Kingdom of Inobhutan. The Ministry of Foreign Affairs disagreed with this publicity stunt, fearing that it may offend the similar-sounding Kingdom of Bhutan. In 1986, the Gin'nan Federation hosted a micronation version of the Olympic Games, the "Mini-dokuritsukoku Olympics" (Japanese: ミニ独立国オリンピック), which was broadcast on prime-time television. Kirikiri Country, named after the novel, hosted their own version of United Nations summits between 1983 and 1985. The Nikoniko Republic established their own timezone and minted their own currency. In 1987, the President of the Alcohol Republic, representing the peace delegation of the micronations, visited Vatican City and shook hands with Pope John Paul II.

Following the burst of the asset price bubble in the early 1990s, many local businesses closed, city budget decreased and municipalities were merged and consolidated, leading to the dissolution of many of the micronations. It is estimated that around 203 micronations were established in total during the boom.

== Current situation ==
As of 2016, less than 50 micronations remain. A 2020 study found 40 active micronations. Activities of the "New Yamatai State" was suspended in 2010, but restarted in 2020 in response to the challenges of the COVID-19 pandemic in Japan.

== Notable micronations ==
- Akhotsk Republic (アホーツク共和国) – Bihoro, Hokkaido
- Alcohol Republic (アルコール共和国) – Sado Island, Niigata
- Chirorin Village (チロリン村)
- Commonwealth of Cassiopeia (カシオペア連邦) – Iwate Prefecture region
- Country of Nature (自然の国) – Saikai, Nagasaki
- Crab Kingdom (カニ王国) – Hyōgo Prefecture
- Drift Ice Iceland Republic (流氷あいすらんど共和国) – Monbetsu, Hokkaido
- Frog Village (カエル村) – Daisen, Akita
- Galactic Federation (銀河連邦) – Japan Aerospace Exploration Agency facilities across the country
  - Republic of Kakuda (カクダ共和国) – Kakuda, Miyagi
  - Republic of Noshiro (ノシロ共和国) – Noshiro, Akita
  - Republic of Sagamihara (サガミハラ共和国) – Sagamihara, Kanagawa
  - Republic of Saku (サク共和国) – Saku, Nagano
  - Republic of Sanrikuofunato (サンリクオオフナト共和国) – Ōfunato, Iwate
  - Republic of Taiki (タイキ共和国) – Taiki, Hokkaido
  - Republic of Uchinourakimotsuki (ウチノウラキモツキ共和国) – Kimotsuki, Kagoshima
- Ginko Federation (銀杏国) – Hachiōji, Tokyo
- Republic of Hokkaido (共和国北海道) - Sapporo, Hokkaido
- Kingdom of Inobhutan (イノブータン王国) – Susami, Wakayama
- Kirikiri Country (吉里吉里国) – Ōtsuchi, Iwate
- New Yamatai State (新邪馬台国) – Usa, Ōita
- Nikoniko Republic (ニコニコ共和国) – Nihonmatsu, Fukushima
- Panauru Kingdom (パナウル王国) – Yoron, Kagoshima
- Potato Republic (ポテト共和国) – Niseko, Hokkaido
- Shiso Forest Kingdom (しそう森林王国) – Shisō, Hyōgo
- Soyankda United States (そやんか合衆国) – Taishō-ku, Osaka
- Tsuchinoko Republic (ツチノコ共和国) – Shimokitayama, Nara

== See also ==
- Inunaki Village, a Japanese urban mythical location who according the myth, the village's aggressive residents refuse to follow the rules of the Japanese constitution, thus "secede" from Japan
